= General Douglas =

General Douglas may refer to:

- Archibald Douglas (1707–1778), British Army lieutenant general
- Archibald Douglas (1883–1960), Swedish Army lieutenant general
- Charles W. H. Douglas (1850–1914), British Army general
- George Douglas, 1st Earl of Dumbarton (1635–1692), English Army major general
- Gustaf Otto Douglas (1687–1771), Swedish mercenary general for the Russian Army
- Henry Edward Manning Douglas (1875–1939), British Army major general
- Henry Kyd Douglas (1838–1903), Maryland National Guard major general
- Howard Douglas (1776–1861), British Army general
- James Douglas (British Army officer) (1785–1862), British Army general
- James Douglas (English Army officer) (1645–1691), Scottish lieutenant general
- James Douglas, Lord of Douglas (c. 1286–1330), general in the Wars of Scottish Independence
- John Douglas (British Army officer) (1817–1888), British Army general
- John Douglas (Royal Marines officer) (died 1814), Royal Marines major general
- Kenneth Douglas (1754–1833), British Army lieutenant general
- Neil Douglas (1779–1853), British Army lieutenant general
- Paul P. Douglas Jr. (1919–2002), U.S. Air Force brigadier general
- Major-General Robert Douglas (1727—1809), commander of 's-Hertogenbosch, a garrison city 1780—1794
- Major-General Sir Robert Percy Douglas (1804—1891), 4th baronet of Carr
- Major-General Robert Douglas of Garlston, NB', (c. 1744—1798)
- Major-General Robert Douglas ( —1828, of the 55th Regiment of Foot, formerly Adjutant-General in the West Indies
- Thomas Monteath Douglas (1787–1868), Bengal Army general
- William Douglas (British Army officer, born 1858) (1858–1920), British Army major general

== See also ==
- John Douglas-Withers (1919–1997), British Army major general
- Attorney General Douglas (disambiguation)
