= List of governors of Edinburgh Castle =

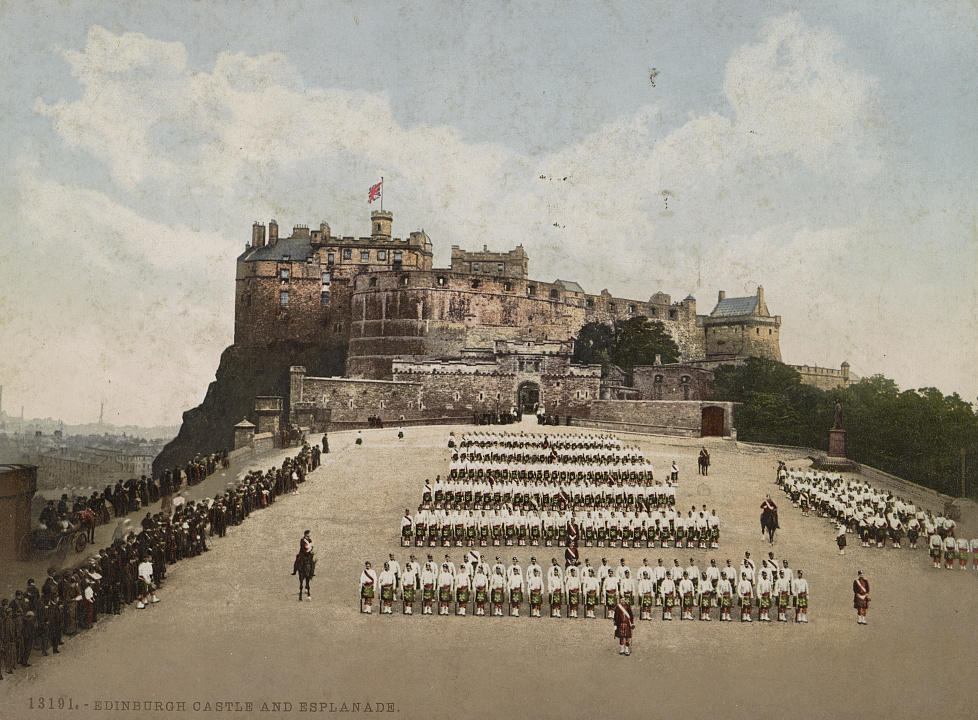
Edinburgh Castle in 1890

The governor of Edinburgh Castle, also sometimes known as the keeper or captain, had overall control of the royal castle of Edinburgh, Scotland. The governor was usually assisted by a deputy-governor and a constable, the latter being under the command of the Lord High Constable of Scotland.

The governor had lodgings within the castle, with a governor's house being built in 1742. Although the post was never formally abolished, governors ceased to be appointed after the death in 1876 of Henry Dundas, 3rd Viscount Melville.

The office was revived in 1936 as an honorary title for the general officer commanding of Scottish Command. However, since 2015, this is no longer the case, with General Officer, Scotland and Governor of Edinburgh Castle being two separate appointments.

== Governors of Edinburgh Castle ==
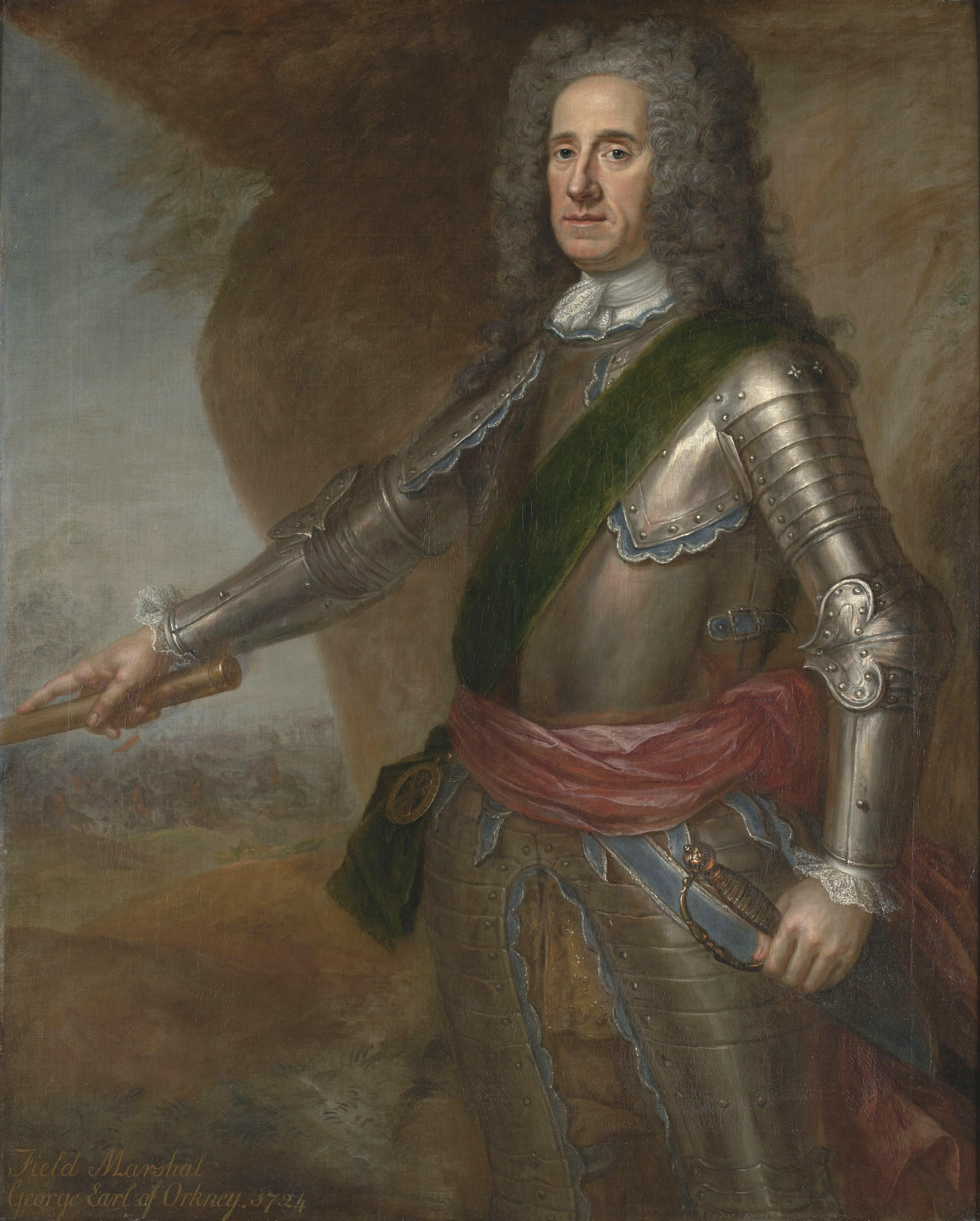
George Hamilton, 1st Earl of Orkney, Governor from 1714 to 1737

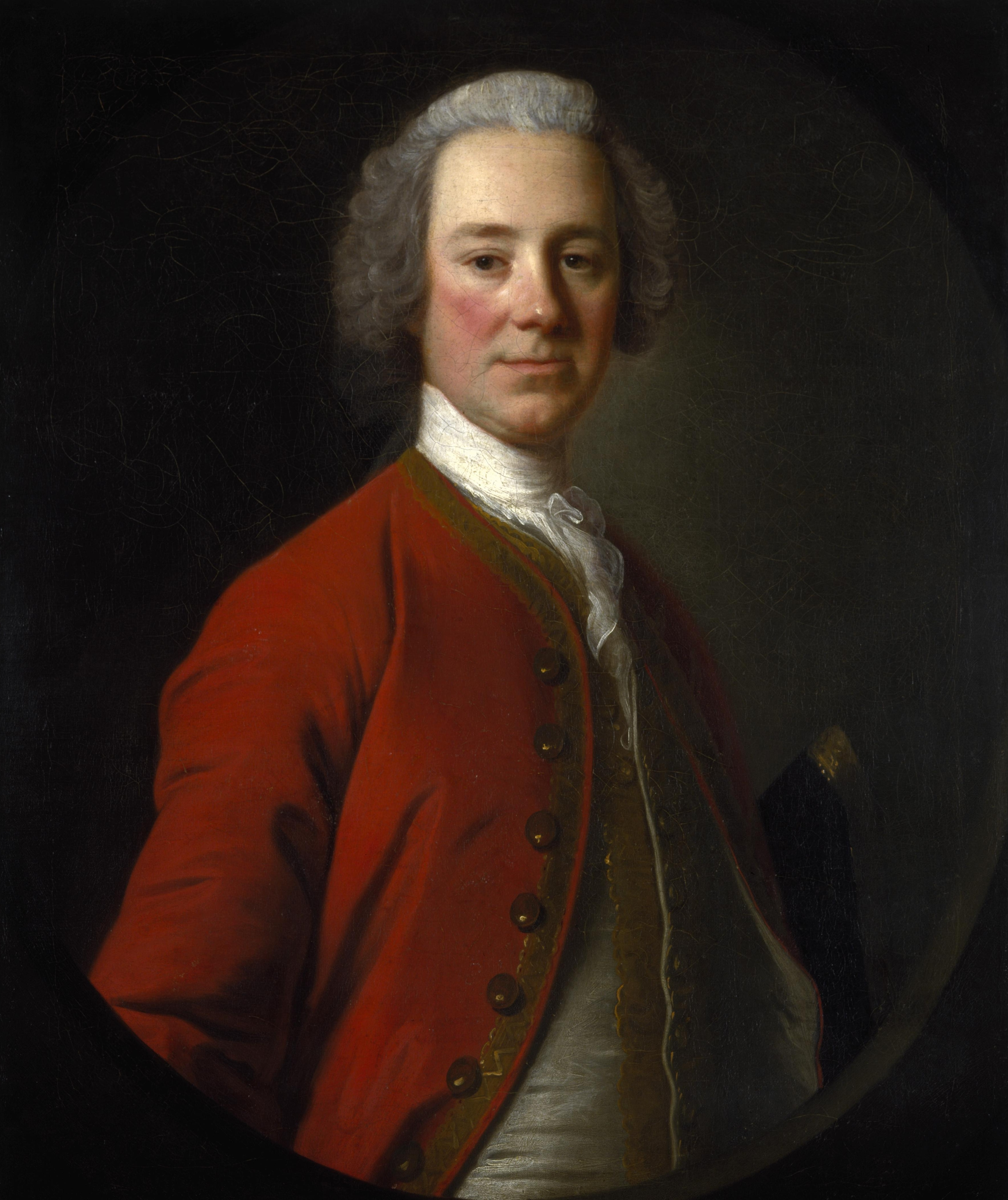
John Campbell, 4th Earl of Loudoun, Governor from 1763 to 1782

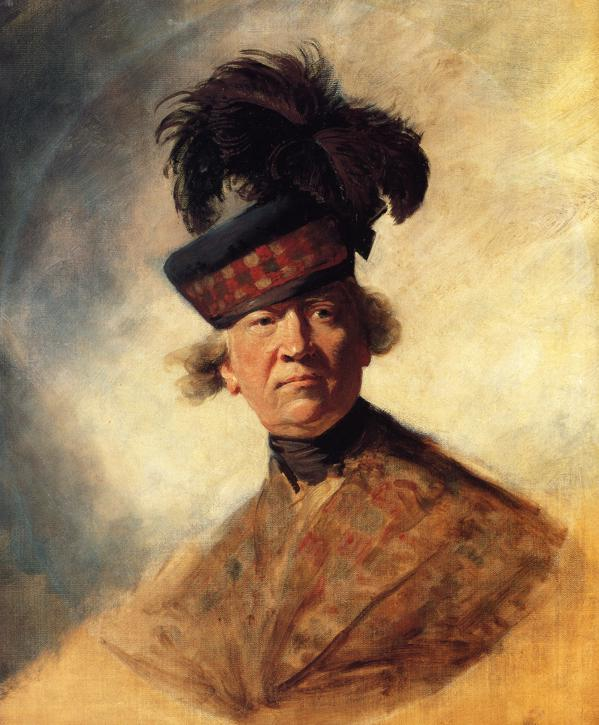
Archibald Montgomerie, 11th Earl of Eglinton, Governor from 1782 to 1796

- After 1067 (d. 1121): Bartolf Leslie
- 1107–?: Thomas de Cancia
- 1153–1165: Geoffrey de Melville
- 1165–1214: Reginald
- 1171–1177: Rodbert
- 1230–1231: Philip de Mowbray, Constable
- 1251–?: Walter Comyn, Earl of Menteith (died 1258)
- Dates unknown William, Constable
- 1263–?: William de Lysuris
- 1278–1292: William de Kinghorn
- Dates unknown William Clerk

The castle was in English hands from 1291 to 1314, during the Wars of Scottish Independence.

- 1291–1296: Sir Ralph Basset de Drayton, English governor
- 1296–1298: Sir Walter de Huntercombe, English governor
- 1298–?: Sir John de Kingston, English governor - Captain and Constable
- 1300–?: William de Rue, English governor
- 1310–1314: Sir Piers de Lombard, English governor (from Gascony)

Following the Castle's recapture by the Scots under Thomas Randolph, 1st Earl of Moray in 1314, it was slighted and unused until the English returned in 1333.

- 1334–?: Sir John de Kingston, English governor
- 1336–?: Sir John Strivelyne, English governor
- 1337–?: Thomas Kynton, English captain and marshal, assassinated
- 1340–1341: Sir Thomas de Rokeby, English governor

The castle was again recaptured by the Scots under Sir William Douglas in 1341.

- ...
- 1346: Sir David Lindsay, 6th Lord of Crawford
- 1350–?: Sir Robert Erskine of Alva
- 1360–?: John MacDonald, Lord of the Isles
- 1360(?)–1364: Archibald the Grim
- ...
- c.1375–1382 Sir John Lyon
- ...
- c.1400: David Stewart, Duke of Rothesay
- ...
- 1420: Sir William Borthwick 'the younger', 2nd of Borthwick
- 1425–1433: Sir Robert de Lawedre [Lauder] of The Bass, Knt.
- 1434–1445: Sir William Crichton, Knt.
- 1447: Patrick Cockburn of Clerkington, Haddingtonshire.
- 1453-1459: Thomas Oliphant
- 1460: Sir John Cockburn, Knight of Ormiston
- 1466: Sir Alexander Boyd
- ...
- 1488–?: Patrick Hepburn, 1st Earl of Bothwell
- ...
- c.1515–after 1524: James Hamilton, 1st Earl of Arran
- ...
- 1544–1548: James Hamilton of Stenhouse
- 1548–1554 William Hamilton of Sanquhar.
- c.1559 – 19 March 1566: John Erskine, 6th Lord Erskine
- 1566–1567:James Cockburn of Skirling
- 1567–1568:Sir James Balfour of Pittendreich
- 1568–1573: Sir William Kirkcaldy of Grange, defended the castle for Mary, Queen of Scots, during the "Lang Siege"
- 1574–?: George Douglas of Parkhead
- 28 March 1579 – ?: Sir Alexander Erskine of Gogar
- 1584: James Stewart, Earl of Arran
- ...
- ?–1591: Sir James Hume, Captain.
- 1600?: Andrew Stewart, 3rd Lord Ochiltree
- ...
- 1615–1638: John Erskine, Earl of Mar
- 1638–?: John Elphinstone, 2nd Lord Balmerino
- 1639–1640: Sir Patrick Ruthven
- 1641–?: Alexander Leslie, 1st Earl of Leven
- 1645–?: Alexander Lindsay, 1st Earl of Balcarres
- 1648: James Hamilton, 1st Duke of Hamilton
- 1650: Colonel Walter Dundas of Dundas
- 1650: George Fenwick, appointed by Oliver Cromwell following his capture of the Castle
- 1651–1652: Major-General Robert Overton, appointed by Cromwell
- ...
- 1661–?: John Middleton, 1st Earl of Middleton
- 1663–?: John Maitland, 1st Duke of Lauderdale
- 1664: Colonel James Murray
- ...
- 1682–1686: William Douglas, 1st Duke of Queensberry
- 1686–1689: George Gordon, 1st Duke of Gordon, defended the castle for the exiled James VII
- 1689–1702: David Leslie, 3rd Earl of Leven
- 1702–1704: William Douglas, 1st Earl of March
- 1705–1712: David Leslie, 3rd Earl of Leven
- 1712–1714: John Campbell, 2nd Duke of Argyll
- 1714–1737: General George Hamilton, 1st Earl of Orkney
- 1737–1738: Charles Douglas, 2nd Earl of Selkirk
- 1738: George Ross, 13th Lord Ross
- 1738–1745: Lieutenant-General Sir James Campbell of Lawers
- 1745–1752: General Lord Mark Kerr
- 1752–1763: Lieutenant General Humphrey Bland
- 1763–1782: General John Campbell, 4th Earl of Loudoun
- 1782–1796: General Archibald Montgomerie, 11th Earl of Eglinton
- 1796–1801: General Lord Adam Gordon
- 1801–1827: General Sir Robert Abercromby
- 1827–1836: General George Gordon, 5th Duke of Gordon
- 1836–1837: General Patrick Stuart
- 1837–1842: General Lord Greenock
- 1842–1847: Lieutenant-General Sir Neil Douglas
- 1847–1852: General Sir Henry Riddell
- 1852–1854: General Sir Thomas Napier
- vacant; Melville appointed retroactive to 1855
- 1860–1876: General Henry Dundas, 3rd Viscount Melville
- 1876–1936: vacant

=== Modern governors ===
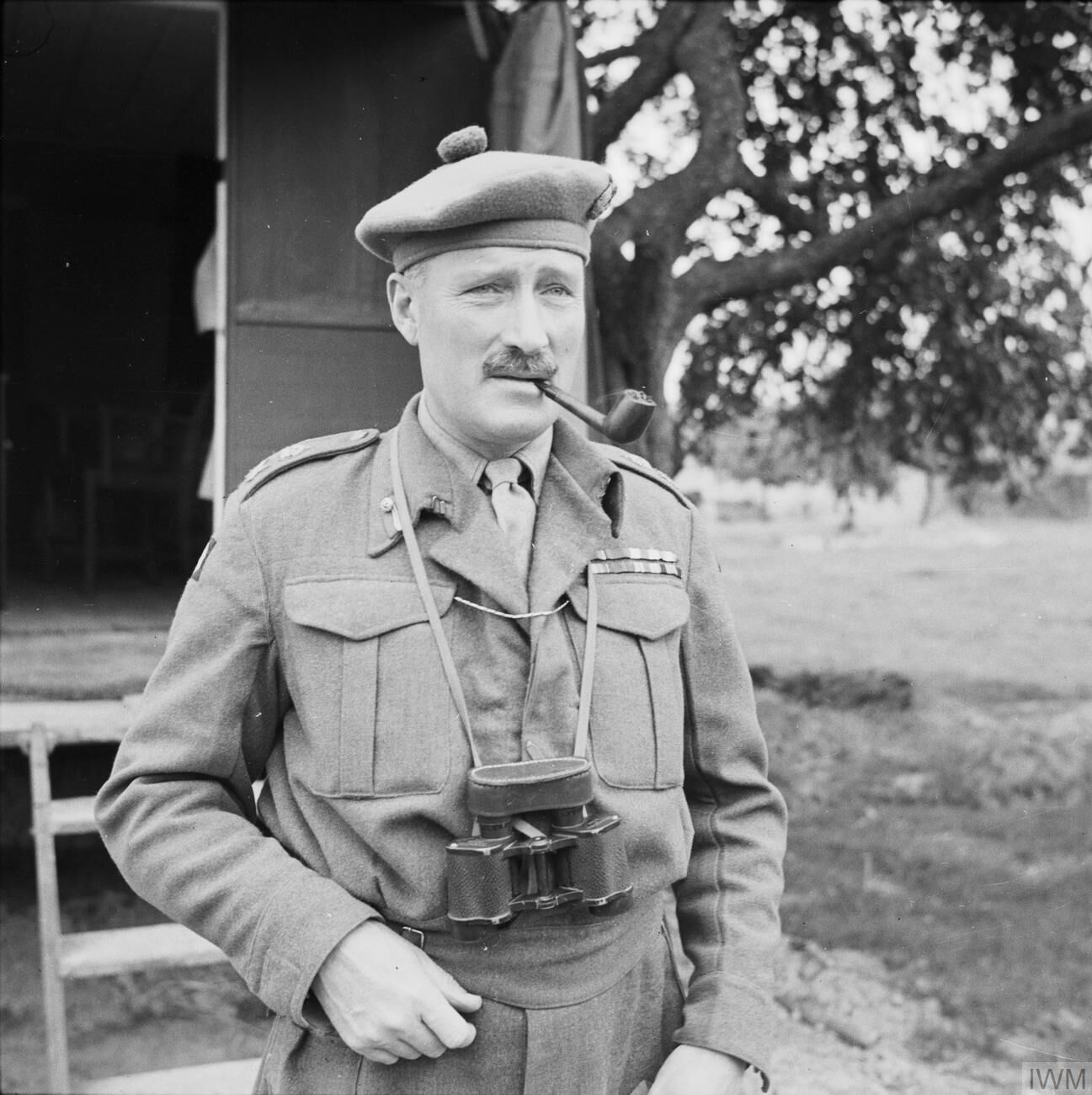
General Sir Neil Ritchie, Governor from 1945 to 1947

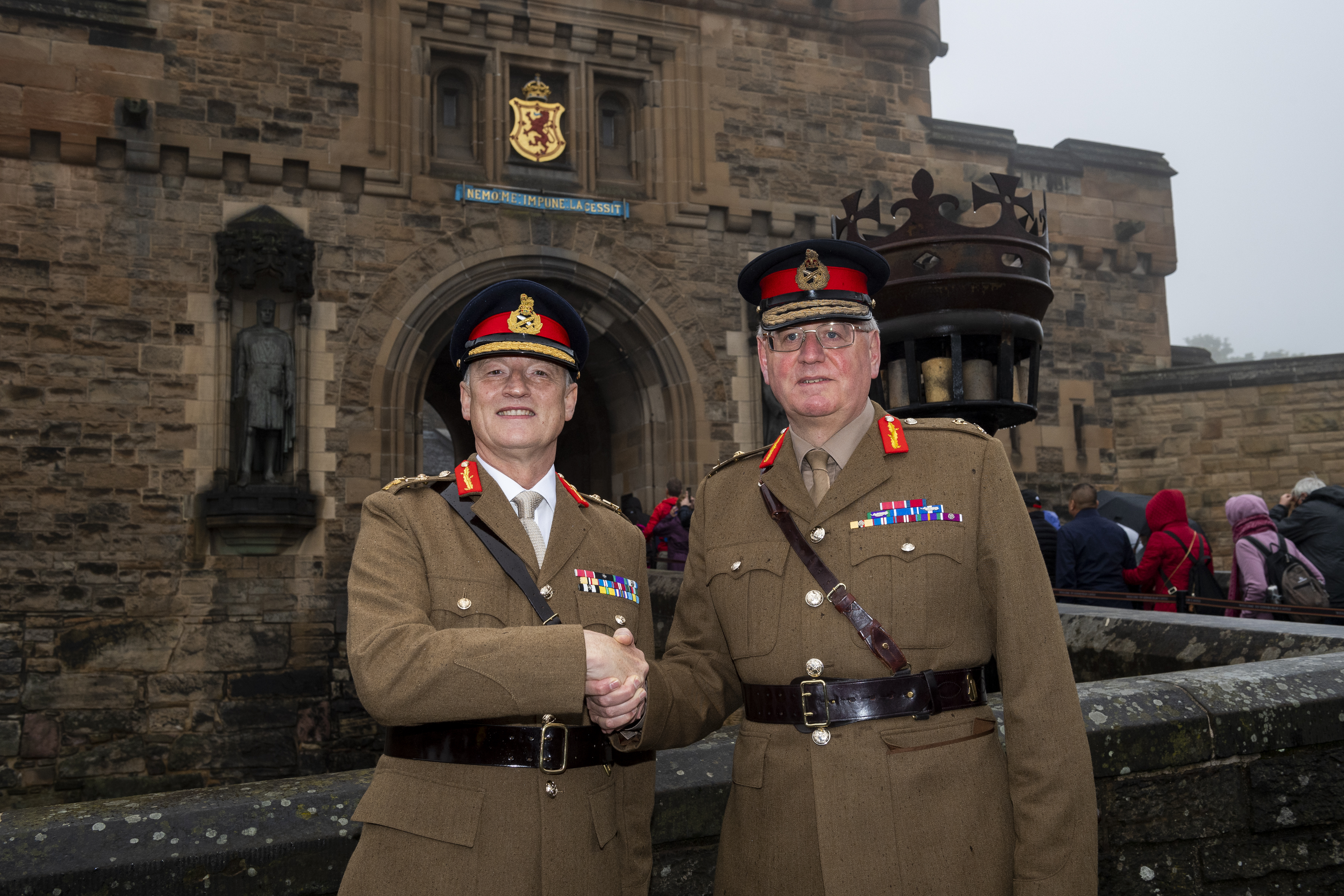
2019 handover from Riddell-Webster (R) to Bruce (L)

- 1936–1937: General Sir Archibald Cameron of Lochiel
- 1937–1940: General Sir Charles Grant
- 1940–1941: Lieutenant-General Sir Harold Carrington
- 1941–1945: Lieutenant-General Sir Andrew Thorne
- 1945–1947: General Sir Neil Ritchie
- 1947–1949: Lieutenant-General Sir Philip Christison
- 1949–1952: Lieutenant-General Sir Gordon MacMillan
- 1952–1955: Lieutenant-General Sir Colin Barber
- 1955–1958: Lieutenant-General Sir Horatius Murray
- 1958–1961: Lieutenant-General Sir George Collingwood
- 1961–1964: Lieutenant-General Sir William Turner
- 1964–1966: Lieutenant-General Sir George Gordon-Lennox
- 1966–1969: Lieutenant-General Sir Derek Lang
- 1969–1972: Lieutenant-General Sir Henry Leask
- 1972–1976: Lieutenant-General Sir Chandos Blair
- 1976–1979: Lieutenant-General Sir David Scott-Barrett
- 1979–1980: General Sir Michael Gow
- 1980–1982: Lieutenant-General Sir David Young
- 1982–1985: Lieutenant-General Sir Alexander Boswell
- 1985–1988 Lieutenant-General Sir Norman Arthur
- 1988–1991: Lieutenant-General Sir John MacMillan
- 1991–1993: Lieutenant-General Sir Peter Graham
- 1993–1995: Major-General Michael Scott
- 1995–1997: Major-General Jonathan Hall
- 1997–2000: Major-General Mark Strudwick
- 3 April 2000 – 17 November 2002: Major-General Robert Gordon
- 18 November 2002 – 8 July 2004: Major-General Nick Parker
- 9 July 2004 – 21 January 2007: Major-General Euan Loudon
- 22 January 2007 – 19 June 2009: Major-General David McDowall
- 19 June 2009 – 25 October 2009: Major-General Andrew Mackay
- 26 October 2009 – 4 January 2012: Major-General David Shaw
- 4 January 2012 – 20 October 2015: Major-General Nick Eeles
- 20 October 2015 – June 2019: Major-General Michael Riddell-Webster
- June 2019 – 10 September 2024: Major-General Alastair Bruce of Crionaich
- 10 September 2024 – present: Major-General Bob Bruce

== Bibliography ==
- Gray, W. Forbes (1948). A Short History of Edinburgh Castle. Edinburgh: Moray Press.
- Paul, Sir James Balfour (1904). The Scots Peerage. Edinburgh: David Douglas.
- Anderson, John (1825). Historical and genealogical memoirs of the House of Hamilton. Edinburgh.
