= Mark Strudwick =

British Army general (1945–2021)

Major General Mark Strudwick CBE KStJ
- Born: 19 April 1945
- Died: 26 September 2021 (aged 76)
- Military career
- Allegiance: United Kingdom
- Branch: British Army
- Service years: 1966–2000
- Rank: Major General
- Service number: 481880
- Unit: Royal Scots
- Commands: 1st Battalion, Royal Scots; 3rd Infantry Brigade; General Officer Commanding Scotland
- Conflicts: Operation Banner
- Awards: Commander of the Order of the British Empire; Knight of the Order of St John; Mentioned in Despatches (2)

Major General Mark Jeremy Strudwick CBE KStJ (19 April 1945 – 26 September 2021) was a British Army officer, who served as General Officer Commanding Scotland from 1997 to 2000.

== Military career ==
Educated at St Edmund's School in Canterbury and the Royal Military Academy, Sandhurst, Strudwick was commissioned into the Royal Scots in 1966. He was twice mentioned in despatches for his service in Northern Ireland.

He was appointed commanding officer of 1st Bn the Royal Scots in 1984 and then became an instructor at the Staff College, Camberley, in 1987. In 1990, Strudwick was made a Commander of the Order of the British Empire, and later that same year was appointed commander of 3rd Infantry Brigade. In 1992, Strudwick was appointed to the office of the deputy military secretary at the Ministry of Defence.

He was made director of infantry in 1996 and then General Officer Commanding Scotland in 1997; in that role he was simultaneously Governor of Edinburgh Castle. He retired in 2000.

He was also aide-de-camp to the Queen.

From 2000 to 2012, he was chief executive of the Prince's Scottish Youth Business Trust. He was Chairman of Trustees of the Royal Scots Club, a private members' club in Edinburgh.

== Personal life ==
In 1970, Strudwick married Janet Elizabeth Coleridge Vivers; they went on to have one son and one daughter, all of whom survived him.

Strudwick died on 26 September 2021, at the age of 76.

Military offices
Preceded by Jonathan Hall	General Officer Commanding Scotland; 1997–2000	Succeeded by Nick Eeles (Assumed post April 2012)
