= Andrew Thorne =

British Army general

General Sir Andrew Thorne KCB CMG DSO & Two Bars DL
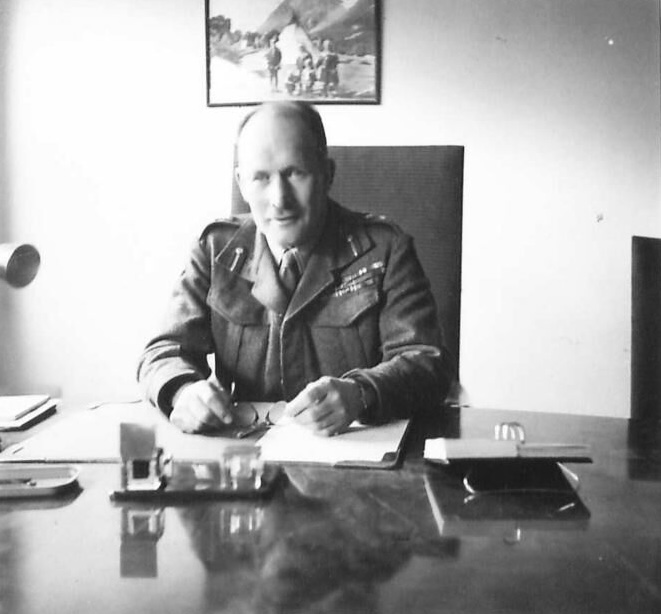
- Thorne in Norway, May 1945
- Born: 20 September 1885; Dornhurst, Sevenoaks, Kent, England
- Died: 25 September 1970 (aged 85); Spynie Hospital, Elgin, Moray, Scotland
- Burial place: St. Andrew's Churchyard, Sonning, Wokingham
- Relatives: Sir Peter Francis Thorne (son)
- Military career
- Allegiance: United Kingdom
- Branch: British Army
- Service years: 1904–1946
- Rank: General
- Nickname: "Bulgy"
- Service number: 13980
- Unit: Grenadier Guards
- Commands: Scottish Command; XII Corps; 48th (South Midland) Infantry Division; Brigade of Guards; 1st Infantry Brigade (Guards); 184th Infantry Brigade; 3rd Battalion, Grenadier Guards
- Conflicts: First World War; Arab revolt in Palestine; Second World War
- Awards: Knight Commander of the Order of the Bath; Companion of the Order of St Michael and St George; Distinguished Service Order & Two Bars; Mentioned in Despatches; Commander's Cross with Star of the Order of Polonia Restituta (Poland); Commander of the Legion of Merit (United States); Knight Grand Cross of the Order of St. Olav (Norway); Legion of Honour (France)

General Sir Augustus Francis Andrew Nicol Thorne, KCB, CMG, DSO & Two Bars, DL (20 September 1885 – 25 September 1970) was a senior British Army officer who served in the First and Second World Wars, where he commanded the 48th (South Midland) Infantry Division during the Battle of France in mid-1940.

== Family ==
Thorne was the son of Augustus Thorne, a barrister, and Mary Frances Nicol. His nephew, Patrick Campbell-Preston, was the husband of Dame Frances Campbell-Preston.

Thorne married the Hon. Margaret Douglas-Pennant, daughter of George Douglas-Pennant, 2nd Baron Penrhyn, on 29 July 1909 at the Guards' Chapel, Wellington Barracks, in London. They had six children, including Lieutenant Colonel Sir Peter Francis Thorne.

== Early military career ==
Educated at Eton and the Royal Military College, Sandhurst, Thorne was commissioned as a second lieutenant into the Grenadier Guards on 2 March 1904.

== First World War ==
He served in the First World War, becoming a staff captain, having been promoted to the rank of captain on 22 March 1913, then deputy assistant adjutant and quartermaster general and then deputy assistant quartermaster general in France. He became commanding officer of the 3rd Battalion, Grenadier Guards in 1916, and saw action in the First Battle of Ypres in 1914 and Battle of the Somme in 1916, earning the Distinguished Service Order and two Bars. The citation for his first Bar, appearing in The London Gazette in July 1918, reads:

For conspicuous gallantry and devotion to duty. When his battalion had captured its objective in an attack he organised the consolidation of the position and supervised the placing of strong points under very heavy fire. It was mainly through his excellent dispositions that the battalion maintained its position against heavy enemy counter-attacks. He showed great coolness and ability.

Thorne was also awarded the Legion of Honour by the President of France in 1917, and was promoted to acting lieutenant colonel in July that year as well.

On 14 October 1918 he became general officer commanding (GOC) of the 184th Infantry Brigade, part of the 61st (2nd South Midland) Division, and with it came the temporary rank of brigadier general although his substantive, or permanent, rank was still a major. Just a month after his thirty-third birthday, he was one of the youngest generals in the British Army during the First World War.

== Between the wars ==
After the war Thorne became assistant military attaché at Washington, D.C. He then returned to the United Kingdom to attend a shortened course at the Staff College, Camberley. This was followed, in 1922, by him becoming a General Staff Officer (GSO) at London District. He served at the Staff College as an instructor from 1923 to 1925. He was appointed military assistant to the Chief of the Imperial General Staff at the War Office in 1925 and commanding officer of the 3rd Battalion, Grenadier Guards again in 1927. In 1932, he was made military attaché in Berlin for three years, where he came to know Adolf Hitler and many of his senior officers. He was commander of the 1st Guards Brigade at Aldershot Command in 1935, a temporary brigade commander in Palestine and Transjordan in 1936, and in 1938 he became Major General commanding the Brigade of Guards and General Officer Commanding (GOC) London District.

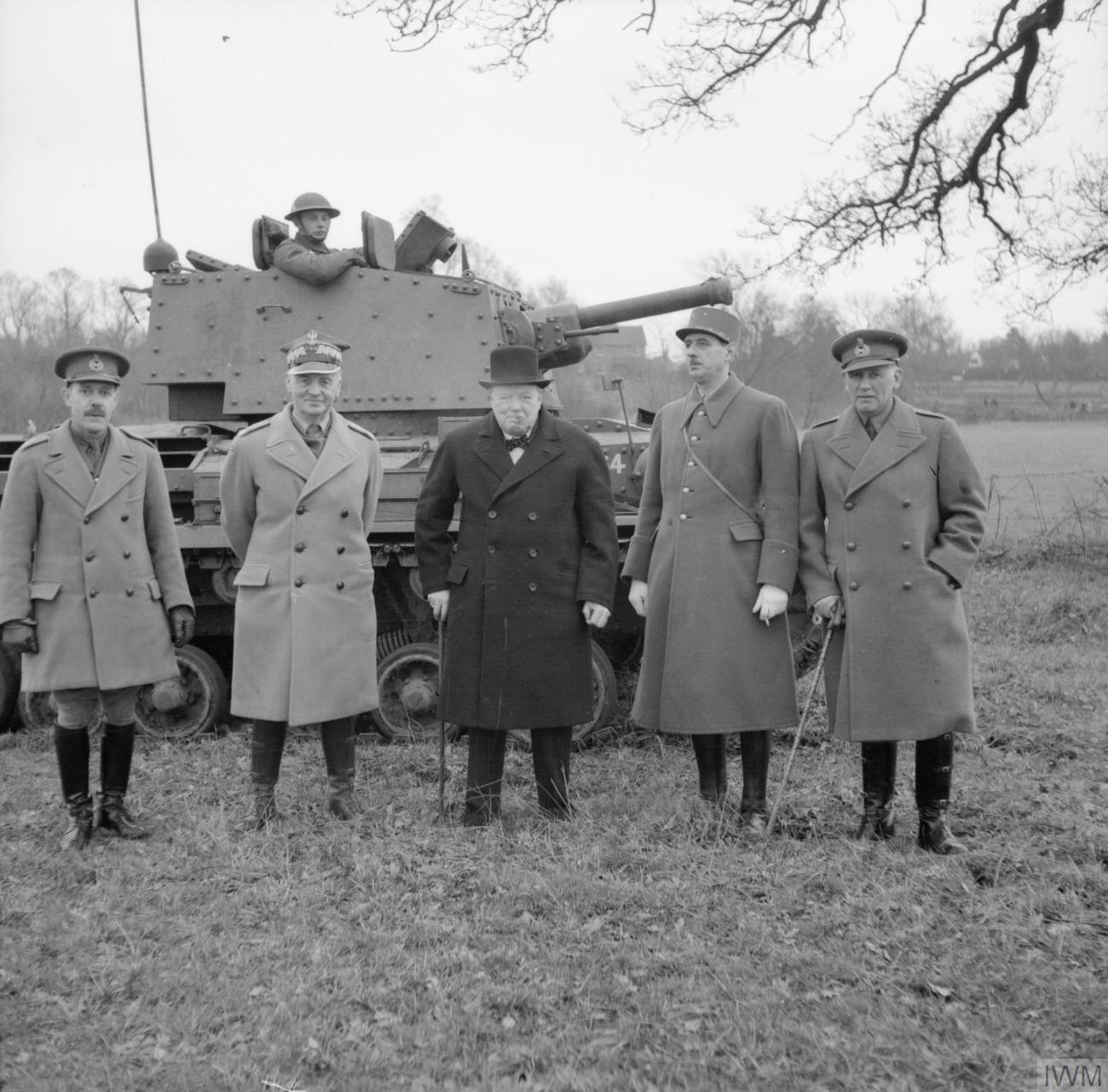
At a tank demonstration February 1941, Thorne (far right) with Giffard Le Quesne Martel (Commander Royal Armoured Corps), Władysław Sikorski (C-in-C Polish Armed Forces), British Prime Minister Winston Churchill, General Charles de Gaulle (C-in-C Free French Forces), February 1941.

== Second World War ==
In 1939, at the start of the Second World War, Thorne became GOC 48th (South Midland) Infantry Division, which played an important role in the Battle of Dunkirk in 1940. He then became GOC XII Corps, where he founded the innovative XII Corps Observation Unit as a prototype of the Auxiliary Units guerrilla organisation. He became GOC Scottish Command and Governor of Edinburgh Castle in 1941 and was appointed a Knight Commander of the Order of the Bath (KCB) in the 1942 Birthday Honours. Whilst in Scotland, he was involved in the creation of War Office Selection Boards and responsible for the Fortitude North deception plan, as well as preparation for the Operation Doomsday the liberation of Norway.

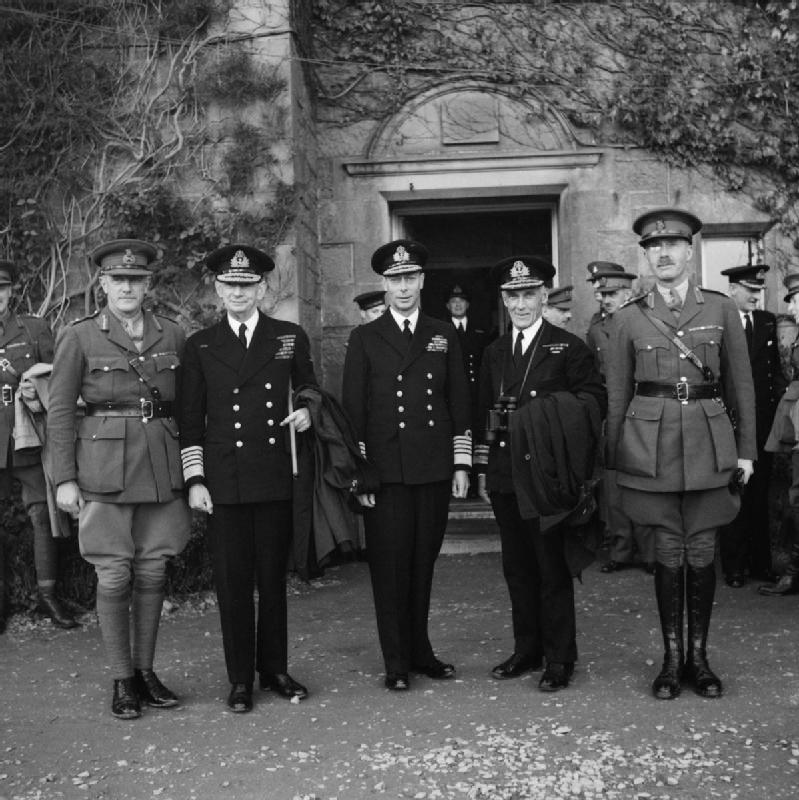
King George VI visiting Scottish Command in October 1941. Lieutenant General Thorne is stood on the far left.

Germany surrendered in Norway on 8 May 1945, and Thorne arrived on 13 May together with Crown Prince Olav. He brought with him a small military force, a tenth the size of the German military presence and so had to rely on cooperation with paramilitary forces from the Norwegian resistance movement. He cooperated closely with Jens Chr. Hauge.

After the end of the war in Europe, German prisoners in Norway were reportedly forced to clear minefields under British supervision. The Germans complained to Thorne but he dismissed the accusations arguing that the Germans prisoners were not prisoners of war but "disarmed forces who had surrendered unconditionally". By 1946, when the cleanup ended, 392 were injured and 275 had died; this was contrary to the terms of the Geneva Conventions. He formally held the sovereignty of Norway until 7 June, when Haakon VII of Norway returned from his exile. Thorne remained in charge of dismantling the German presence in Norway until he left the country on 31 October 1945. Thorne retired in 1946.

== Post-war years ==
He was chairman of the Anglo-Norse Society for some time and was at some point a deputy lieutenant of Berkshire.

== Bibliography ==
- Ashley Hart, Stephen (Autumn 2001). "The Forgotten Liberator: The 1939–1945 Military Career of General Sir Andrew Thorne". Journal of the Society for Army Historical Research. 79 (319): 233–249. JSTOR 44232609.
- "THORNE, General Sir (Augustus Francis) Andrew (Nicol)". (2007). In Who Was Who. Online edition.
- Mann, Christopher (September 2008). "Thorne, Sir (Augustus Francis) Andrew Nicol (1885–1970)". Oxford Dictionary of National Biography (online ed.). Oxford University Press. doi:10.1093/ref:odnb/50362. (Subscription, Wikipedia Library access or UK public library membership required.)
- Lindsay, Donald (1987). Forgotten General: Life of Andrew Thorne. Salisbury: M. Russell. ISBN 978-0-85955-137-3.
- Mead, Richard (2007). Churchill's Lions: a biographical guide to the key British generals of World War II. Stroud (UK): Spellmount. ISBN 978-1-86227-431-0.
- Smart, Nick (2005). Biographical Dictionary of British Generals of the Second World War. Barnsley, South Yorkshire: Pen and Sword Books. ISBN 1844150496.

Military offices
Preceded by Sir Bertram Sergison-Brooke	GOC London District; 1938–1939	Succeeded by Sir Bertram Sergison-Brooke
Preceded by Frank Roberts	GOC 48th (South Midland) Infantry Division; 1939–1940	Succeeded by Roderic Petre
New command	GOC XII Corps; 1940–1941	Succeeded by Bernard Montgomery
Preceded by Sir Harold Carrington	GOC-in-C Scottish Command; 1941–1945	Succeeded by Sir Neil Ritchie
