= David McDowall (British Army officer) =

British Army general (1954–2025)

Major General David McDowall CBE
- Born: 16 August 1954
- Died: 24 April 2025 (aged 70)
- Military career
- Allegiance: United Kingdom
- Branch: British Army
- Service years: 1973–2009
- Rank: Major General
- Unit: Royal Corps of Signals
- Commands: 2nd Infantry Division; 1st Signal Brigade
- Conflicts / operations: The Troubles; Operation Banner; Bosnian War
- Awards: Commander of the Order of the British Empire

Major General David McDowall CBE (16 August 1954 – 24 April 2025) was a British Army officer who commanded the 2nd Division from 2007 to 2009.

== Military career ==
McDowall joined the British Army as a private in the Royal Corps of Signals at the age of 18. He was commissioned into the corps in 1981, and later commanded a squadron in operations in Northern Ireland and a regiment in operations during the Bosnian War. He went on to be commander 1st Signal Brigade and then Signal Officer-in-Chief, before being appointed General Officer Commanding 2nd Division and Governor of Edinburgh Castle in 2007 and retiring in 2009.

McDowall served as a member of the British Government's Panel on Fair Access to the Professions, and military adviser to the First Minister of Scotland.

McDowall piped in the Royal Signals Pipes and Drums, having learnt to play before joining. In 2009, the year of his retirement, he was the lone piper at the Edinburgh Tattoo. In 2024, he became President of the Royal Scottish Pipe Band Association.

== Personal life and death ==
McDowall was married to Valerie; they had two sons and a daughter. He died on 24 April 2025, at the age of 70.

Military offices
Preceded by Euan Loudon	General Officer Commanding 2nd Division; 2007–2009	Succeeded by Andrew Mackay
