= Cecilia Douglas =

- Born: 28 February 1772; Glasgow, Scotland
- Died: 25 July 1862 (aged 90); Orbiston House (formerly called Douglas Park), Bothwell, Lanarkshire, Scotland
- Known for: Plantation inheritor; art collector

Cecilia Douglas (née also Douglas) (28 February 1772 – 25 July 1862) was a Scottish owner of West Indian plantations by marriage, and a significant collector of paintings and sculptures. She was one of Scotland's wealthiest women during her lifetime, with a net worth of £40,000 (about £2.4 million in 21st-century money).

== Early life ==
Cecilia Douglas was born to John Douglas, a Scottish merchant of the planter class of the West Indies, and Cecilia Buchanan, on 28 February 1772. She was the fifth of eleven siblings, and one of only two daughters, and the sister of Lieutenant-General Sir Neil Douglas. Her cousin was Sir James Douglas, Governor of Vancouver Island.

== Marriage ==
Douglas married Gilbert Douglas (1749 - 1807), a West Indian plantation owner, on 26 January 1794 in Glasgow. Their marriage, which did not produced any children, lasted until Gilbert's death in 1807.

Gilbert owned two plantations: Fairfield, which was a cotton-plantation in Demerara, and Mount Pleasant, which was a sugar-plantation on St. Vincent. After the death of Gilbert in 1807, Cecilia inherited half of his plantations, including their slaves. He also bequeathed to her the use of estates in Lanarkshire in Scotland, namely Douglas Park and Boggs. She thereby became one of Scotland's wealthiest women during her lifetime, with a net worth of £40,000 (about £2.4 million in 21st-century money).

== Paintings and sculptures ==
In the 1820s she toured Europe, especially Italy, to acquire paintings and sculptures, and made profitable investments in British industry and commerce. She lived at Orbiston House (formerly called Douglas Park), Bothwell, Lanarkshire, Scotland, for the remainder of her years.

She commissioned a stained glass window in Glasgow Cathedral to commemorate her legacy that has since been removed.

She bequeathed her entire collection of paintings and sculptures to the Corporation of Glasgow, who deposited them in their Galleries in Sauciehall Street. Some of her paintings are displayed in the Kelvingrove Art Gallery and Museum, Glasgow.

== Death and memorial ==
She died at Orbiston House (formerly called Douglas Park), Bothwell, Lanarkshire, Scotland, on 25 July 1862. There is an extant memorial plaque on the wall of St. Brides Collegiate Church, Bothwell, Lanarkshire, to her and to her husband.
