= Horatius Murray =

British Army general (1903–1989)

General Sir Horatius Murray GCB KBE DSO
- Born: 18 April 1903; Winchester, Hampshire
- Died: 1989 (aged 86); Kensington, London
- Military career
- Allegiance: United Kingdom
- Branch: British Army
- Service years: 1923–1961
- Rank: General
- Nickname: "Nap"
- Service number: 27245
- Units: Cameronians (Scottish Rifles); Queen's Own Cameron Highlanders
- Commands: Allied Powers Forces Northern Europe (1958–1961); Scottish Command (1955–1958); 1st Commonwealth Division (1953–1954); Northumbrian District (1951–1953); 1st Division (1947–1950); 6th Armoured Division (1944–1945); 153rd Infantry Brigade (1943–1944); 1st Battalion, Gordon Highlanders (1941–1942)
- Conflicts: Second World War; Palestine Emergency; Korean War
- Awards: Knight Grand Cross of the Order of the Bath; Knight Commander of the Order of the British Empire; Distinguished Service Order; Mentioned in Despatches (2); Commander of the Legion of Merit (United States)

General Sir Horatius Murray, GCB, KBE, DSO (18 April 1903 – 1989) was a senior British Army officer who served with distinction during the Second World War and later in the Korean War.

== Early life and military career ==
Educated at Peter Symonds School and the Royal Military College, Sandhurst, Horatius Murray joined the British Army and was commissioned as a second lieutenant into the Cameronians (Scottish Rifles) in 1923. He was promoted to lieutenant in 1925. In 1935 he was transferred to the Queen's Own Cameron Highlanders and advanced to the rank of captain. He attended the Staff College, Camberley for two years from January 1936. After Staff College he was given a staff posting at the War Office and was promoted to major in August 1940, by which time World War II had been raging for almost a year.

== Second World War ==
Murray served in the Second World War, being appointed commanding officer of the 1st Battalion, Gordon Highlanders in 1941. In June 1942 the battalion, forming part of the 153rd Infantry Brigade (in turn part of the 51st (Highland) Infantry Division), was shipped to Egypt, where his unit took part in the Second Battle of El Alamein. Murray was seriously wounded in the early stages of the battle and only returned to active service again in April 1943. After a brief period as temporary General Staff Officer Grade I of the 51st Division, Murray was given command of the 153rd Infantry Brigade in the same division. After a period of rest and refit in Algeria the brigade saw action in the Allied invasion of Sicily, after which it was shipped, with the rest of the division, in November 1943 to England for training and preparation for the Allied invasion of Normandy.

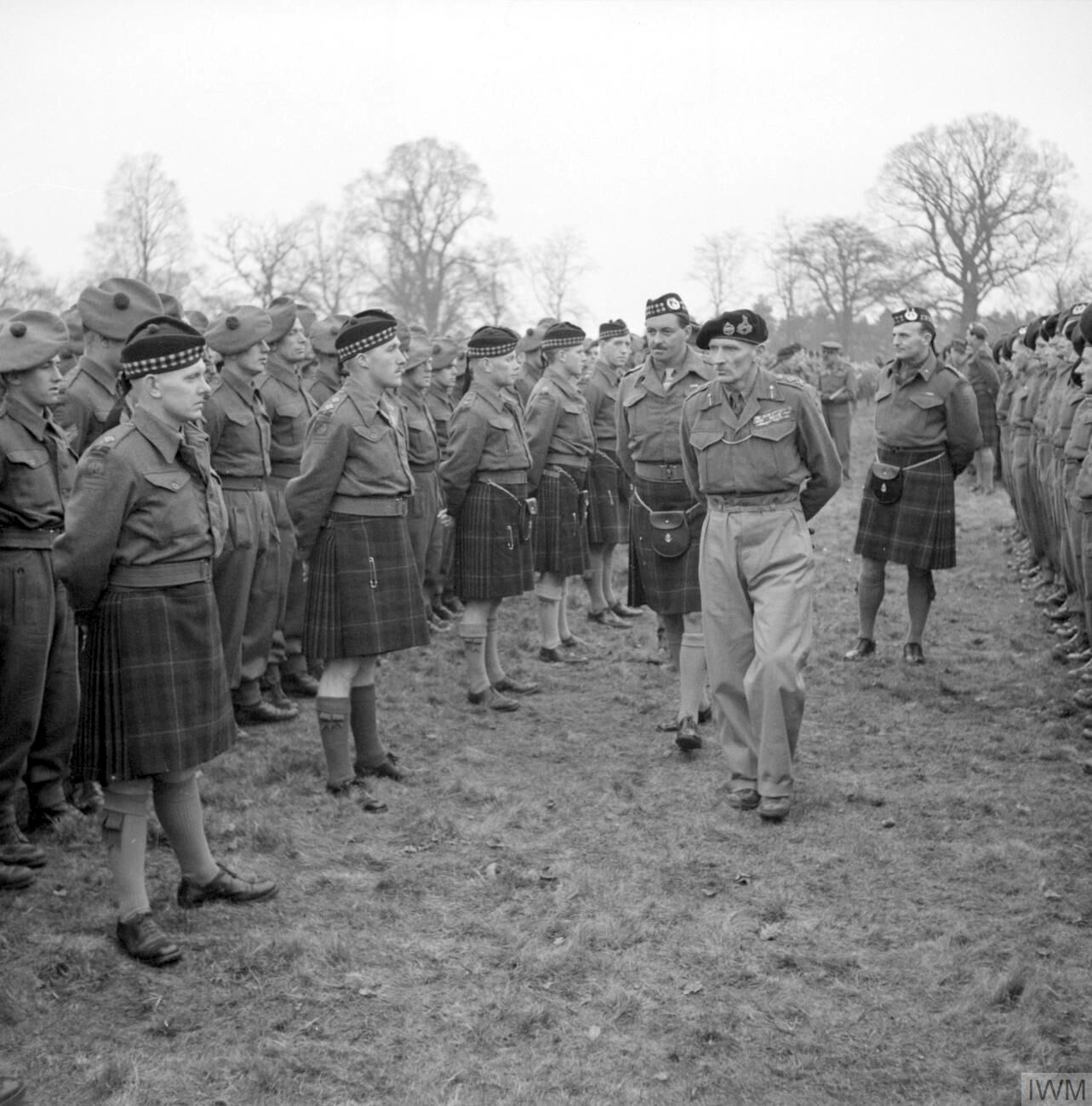
General Sir Bernard Montgomery inspects men of the 5/7th Battalion, Gordon Highlanders at Beaconsfield, February 1944. Stood two behind Montgomery is Brigadier Horatius "Nap" Murray.

Landing in Normandy on the afternoon of D-Day, Murray saw nearly constant action with his brigade until August when he was ordered to Italy to take command of the 6th Armoured Division, after its previous commander, Gerald Templer, was wounded. The division, operating in Italy, was involved in the fighting on the Gothic Line in late 1944 before being withdrawn into reserve and then joining V Corps for the Spring 1945 offensive in Italy. Following the breaking of the Axis defences in the Argenta Gap by the 56th and 78th Infantry Divisions, the 6th Armoured Division was released to exploit across country. Advancing north-west to the River Po, the division linked up with units of the United States Fifth Army, under Lieutenant General Lucian Truscott, advancing from the south to cut off Axis forces in Bologna. By 8 May the division was crossing the Austrian frontier becoming the first element of the British Eighth Army, under Lieutenant General Richard McCreery, to enter German territory. Murray was mentioned in despatches for his services in Italy, and appointed a Companion of the Order of the Bath in 1945.

Although he held an appointment as acting major general, Murray's permanent rank was still only major (war substantive lieutenant colonel, temporary brigadier) at the end of the war because of his relative youth. In August 1945 he was advanced to temporary major general, war substantive colonel. His substantive rank was advanced to full colonel in December 1946, and again to major general in January 1948.

== Postwar career ==
After the war, Murray was appointed Director of Personal Services in 1946 and then General Officer Commanding (GOC) 1st Infantry Division in 1947 in which role he was posted to Palestine and was mentioned in dispatches for services in Palestine between March and September 1947. He relinquished command in December 1950 and went on to become District Officer Commanding Northumbrian District and the Territorial Army's 50th (Northumbrian) Infantry Division in 1951.

Relinquishing command of the 50th Division and the Northumbrian District in August 1953, Murray was appointed GOC 1st Commonwealth Division after the ceasefire had been declared in the Korean War. He relinquished the command in November 1954. In 1955, he was appointed GOC-in-Chief of Scottish Command in the temporary rank of lieutenant general and Governor of Edinburgh Castle. The lieutenant general's rank was made substantive in May.

In 1958, Murray became Commander-in-Chief Allied Forces Northern Europe. He relinquished the appointment in July 1961, having been promoted to full general in 1959. He retired from the British Army in September 1961. He maintained his links with the army, retaining the honorary Colonelship of the Cameronians (Scottish Rifles) until 1964.

== Bibliography ==
- Mead, Richard (2007). Churchill's Lions: a biographical guide to the key British generals of World War II. Stroud (UK): Spellmount. ISBN 978-1-86227-431-0.
- Donovan, John, ed. (2010). A Very Fine Commander - The Memoirs of General Sir Horatius Murray GCB KBE DSO. Pen & Sword Books. ISBN 978-1-84884-337-0.
- Smart, Nick (2005). Biographical Dictionary of British Generals of the Second World War. Barnesley: Pen & Sword. ISBN 1844150496.

Military offices
Preceded by Gerald Templer	GOC 6th Armoured Division; 1944–1945	Post disbanded
Preceded by Richard Gale	GOC 1st Infantry Division; 1947–1950	Succeeded by Francis Matthews
Preceded by Lashmer Whistler	GOC 50th (Northumbrian) Infantry Division; 1951–1953	Succeeded by Cyril Colquhoun
Preceded by Sir Colin Barber	GOC-in-C Scottish Command; 1955–1958	Succeeded by George Collingwood
Preceded by Sir Cecil Sugden	C-in-C Allied Forces Northern Europe; 1958–1961	Succeeded by Sir Harold Pyman
