= Henry Riddell =

British Army general

General Henry Riddell KH
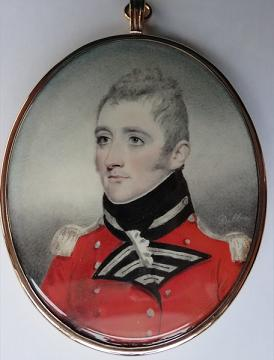
- Henry Riddell
- Died: 8 March 1861
- Military career
- Allegiance: United Kingdom
- Branch: British Army
- Rank: General
- Commands: Commander-in-Chief, Scotland
- Conflicts: Napoleonic Wars
- Awards: Knight of the Royal Guelphic Order

General Henry James Riddell KH (died 8 March 1861) was a British Army officer who became Commander-in-Chief, Scotland.

== Military career ==
Riddell was commissioned in 1798 and took part in the Battle of Copenhagen in August 1807 during the Napoleonic Wars. He became a major in 50th Regiment of Foot on 12 December 1807 and transferred to the 79th Regiment of Foot on 21 April 1808. He became permanent assistant at the Quartermaster General's Department on 4 January 1810 and then went to Spain as Assistant Quartermaster General on the staff in November 1810. He was present at the crossing of the River Bidasoa in 1813.

Riddell served as Commander-in-Chief, Scotland and also as Governor of Edinburgh Castle from 1847 to 1852. He was also colonel of the 6th Regiment of Foot.

Riddell is buried in Greyfriars Kirkyard in central Edinburgh.

Military offices
Preceded by Sir Neil Douglas	Commander-in-Chief, Scotland; 1847–1852	Succeeded by Sir Thomas Napier
Preceded by Sir Neil Douglas	Governor of Edinburgh Castle; 1847–1852	Succeeded by Sir Thomas Napier
