= Bob Bruce (British Army officer) =

British Army officer

Major General Bob Bruce CBE DSO
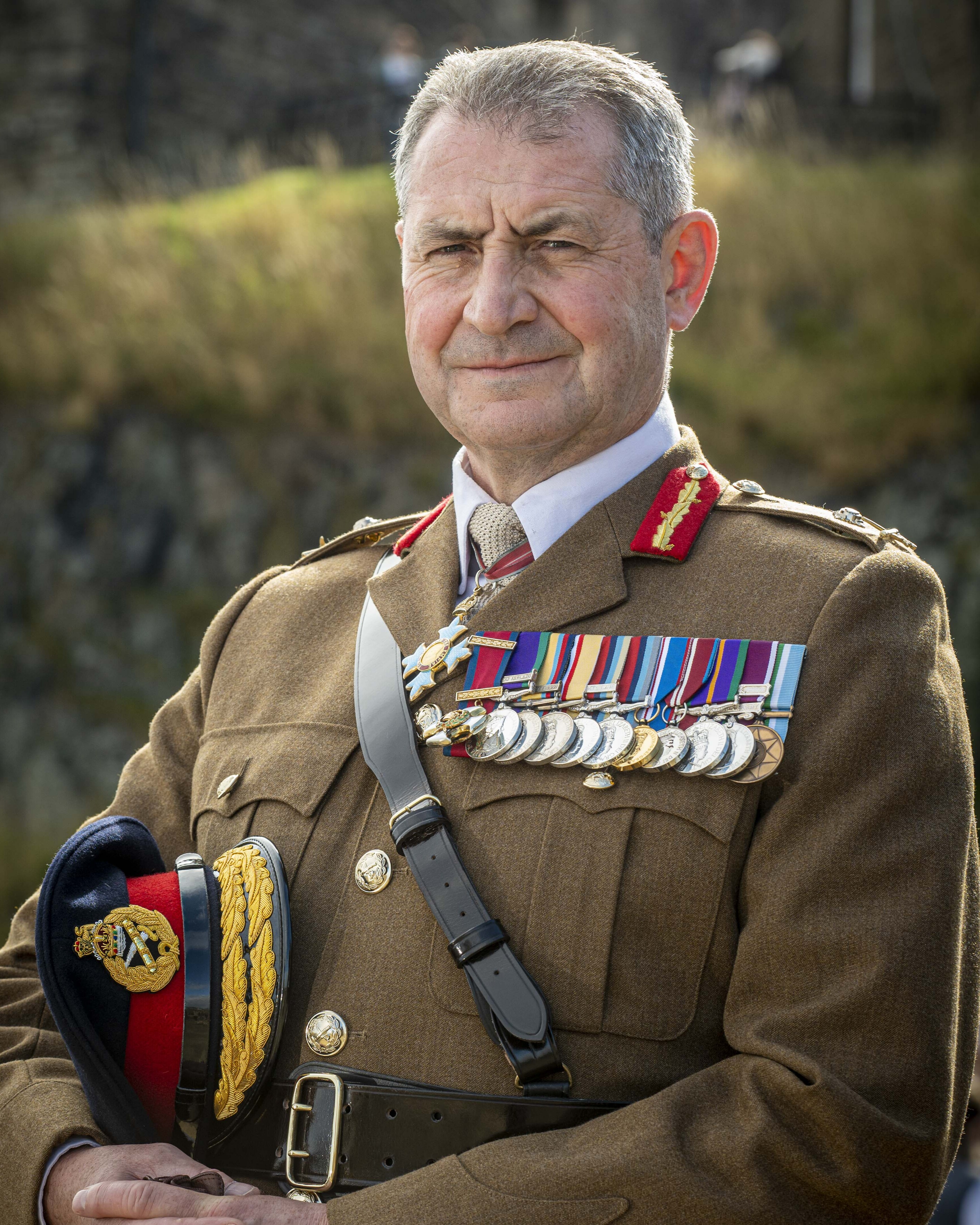
- Bruce in 2024
- Military career
- Allegiance: United Kingdom
- Branch: British Army
- Service years: 1986–present
- Rank: Major General
- Commands: Task Force Helmand; 4th Mechanised Brigade; Royal Scots
- Conflicts: Gulf War; Iraq War; War in Afghanistan; War against the Islamic State
- Awards: Commander of the Order of the British Empire; Distinguished Service Order

Major General Robert Bernard Bruce, CBE, DSO is a British Army officer. He has served as Governor of Edinburgh Castle since September 2024 as part of the Army Reserve, having left the regular army in 2020.

== Military career ==
Bruce was commissioned into the Royal Scots on 5 September 1986. He became commanding officer of the Royal Scots in February 2006 and then of The Royal Scots Borderers, 1st Battalion, The Royal Regiment of Scotland, as the Royal Scots and King's Own Scottish Borderers merged that year. He went on to be commander 4th Mechanised Brigade in 2011 and was deployed as commander of Task Force Helmand in October 2012.

Following his return to the United Kingdom in April 2013, Bruce became Director Combat at Army Headquarters. He was deployed again as Deputy Commander of a multi-national task force in the Middle East in December 2014, and then became Director Capability in the Army Headquarters in November 2015. He became Military Secretary and General Officer, Scotland, in July 2017. Bruce retired from the British Army on 26 February 2020.

Bruce became Colonel of the Royal Regiment of Scotland in July 2016. He was succeeded in that post by Nick Borton on 1 November 2019.

In September 2024, Bruce succeeded Major General Alastair Bruce of Crionaich as Governor of Edinburgh Castle.

Coat of arms of Bob Bruce
Notes Presented by the Lord Lyon King of Arms, 28 April 2025. Motto Fortitudo Per Honorem Et Gratiam

Military offices
Preceded by Nicholas Ashmore	Military Secretary; 2017–2019	Succeeded by Tim Hyams
Preceded by Nicholas Ashmore	General Officer Scotland; 2017–2019	Succeeded by Tim Hyams
Preceded by Alastair Bruce of Crionaich	Governor of Edinburgh Castle; 2024–present	Incumbent
