= George Collingwood =

British Army general (1903–86)

Lieutenant-General Sir George Collingwood KBE CB DSO
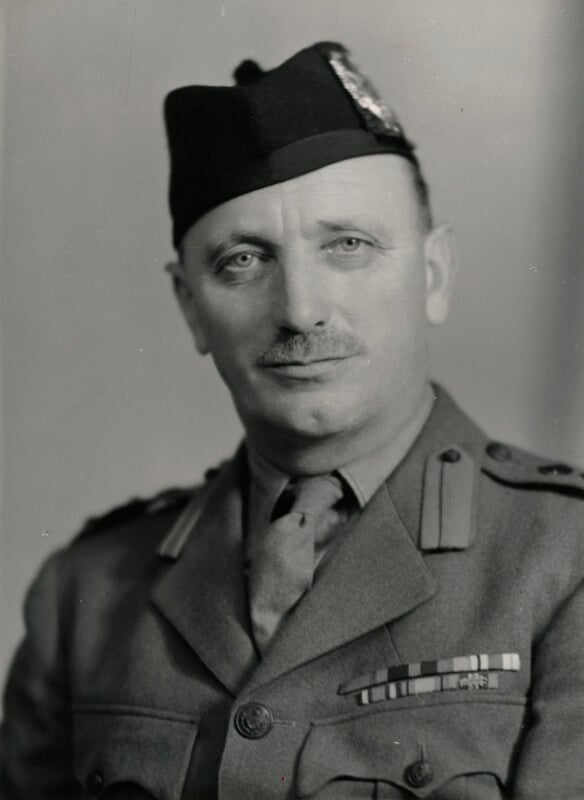
- Collingwood in 1947
- Born: 7 October 1903; Alnwick, Northumberland
- Died: 21 April 1986 (aged 82); Alnwick, Northumberland
- Military career
- Allegiance: United Kingdom
- Branch: British Army
- Service years: 1923–1961
- Rank: Lieutenant-General
- Service number: 27169
- Commands: 23rd Infantry Brigade; 52nd (Lowland) Infantry Division; Singapore District; Scottish Command
- Conflicts: Second World War
- Awards: Knight Commander of the Order of the British Empire; Companion of the Order of the Bath; Distinguished Service Order

Lieutenant-General Sir Richard George Collingwood KBE CB DSO (7 October 1903 – 21 April 1986) was a British Army General during the 1950s.

== Military career ==
Educated at West Downs School, Collingwood was commissioned into the Cameronians (Scottish Rifles) in 1923.

He served during the Second World War, in the Middle East and Burma and was Commander of 23rd Infantry Brigade in Burma in 1945. He went on to be General Officer Commanding 52nd (Lowland) Infantry Division and Lowland District between 1952 and 1955. He then became Commander Singapore District from 1957. In 1958 he became General Officer Commanding-in-Chief of Scottish Command and Governor of Edinburgh Castle; he retired in 1961.

George Collingwood's papers have been archived at Lilburn Tower, his family home in Northumberland.

Military offices
Preceded by George Inglis	GOC 52nd (Lowland) Infantry Division; 1952–1955	Succeeded by Rohan Delacombe
Preceded by Sir Horatius Murray	GOC-in-C Scottish Command; 1958–1961	Succeeded by Sir William Turner
