= John Stuart (British Army officer, born 1811) =

British Army officer (1811–1889)

General John Stuart CB
- Born: 18 June 1811; Blair Atholl, Perthshire
- Died: 18 October 1889 (aged 78); Upper Norwood, London
- Military career
- Allegiance: United Kingdom
- Branch: British Army
- Rank: General
- Commands: Commander-in-Chief, Scotland
- Conflicts: Crimean War
- Awards: Companion of the Order of the Bath

General John Ramsay Stuart CB (18 June 1811 – 18 October 1889) was a British Army officer who became Commander-in-Chief, Scotland.

== Military career ==
Stuart was commissioned into the Royal Scots Fusiliers. He served with his regiment at the Battle of Alma in September 1854 and at the Battle of Balaclava in October 1854, before taking command of his regiment and leading it at the Battle of Inkerman in November 1854 and at the Siege of Sebastopol in Winter 1854 during the Crimean War. He went on to command the troops in the North British District from in 1875 before retiring in 1878.

Stuart was also appointed Regimental Colonel of the 54th Regiment of Foot in 1880, continuing as Colonel of the 1st Battalion of the Dorsetshire Regiment from 1881 to his death.

Military offices
Preceded by Sir John Douglas	Commanding the troops in the North British District; 1875–1878	Succeeded by Robert Bruce
