= Paul Gleadell =

British Army general

Major-General Paul Gleadell CB CBE DSO
- Born: 1910
- Died: 1988 (aged 77–78)
- Military career
- Allegiance: United Kingdom
- Branch: British Army
- Rank: Major-General
- Commands: 44th (Home Counties) Division (1959–1962); 24th Infantry Brigade (1955–1958); 12th Battalion, the Devonshire Regiment (1944–1945)
- Conflicts: Second World War; Cyprus Emergency
- Awards: Companion of the Order of the Bath; Commander of the Order of the British Empire; Distinguished Service Order; Croix de Guerre (France)

Major-General Paul Gleadell, CB, CBE, DSO (1910–1988) was a British Army officer.

== Military career ==
Gleadell was commissioned into the Devonshire Regiment on 28 August 1930. He commanded the 12th Battalion, the Devonshire Regiment during its crossing of the Rhine in March 1945, for which he was awarded the Distinguished Service Order. After the war he became General Staff Officer (Intelligence) at General Headquarters Far East Land Forces in July 1950, commander of the 24th Infantry Brigade in July 1955 and Chief of Staff (Operations) at Land Forces, Cyprus in May 1958 during the Cyprus Emergency. After that he became General Officer Commanding 44th (Home Counties) Division in January 1954 and then Director of Infantry in February 1962 before retiring in February 1965.

Military offices
Preceded by William Turner	GOC 44th (Home Counties) Division; 1959–1962	Succeeded by Harry Grimshaw
