= Harold Carrington =

British Army general

Lieutenant-General Sir Harold Carrington KCB DSO
- Carrington in 1936
- Born: 7 November 1882
- Died: 5 September 1964 (aged 81)
- Military career
- Allegiance: United Kingdom
- Branch: British Army
- Service years: 1901–1941
- Rank: Lieutenant-General
- Nickname: "Freddy"
- Service number: 18677
- Units: Royal Field Artillery; Royal Horse Artillery
- Commands: Scottish Command
- Conflicts: Second Boer War; First World War; Second World War
- Awards: Knight Commander of the Order of the Bath; Distinguished Service Order; Mentioned in Despatches

Lieutenant-General Sir Robert Harold Carrington, KCB, DSO (7 November 1882 – 5 September 1964) was a senior British Army officer during the Second World War.

== Military career ==
Harold Carrington was commissioned into the Royal Field Artillery in 1901; he served in the Second Boer War between 1901 and 1902 and then transferred to the Royal Horse Artillery in 1908. He served during the First World War and was awarded the Distinguished Service Order in 1916.

Carrington remained in the army after the war, attending the Staff College, Camberley in 1920. He then became a General Staff Officer with the 4th Infantry Division, before moving on to become Commander, of Royal Artillery for the division in 1932. In 1936 he became a major general with command of the Royal Artillery at Army Headquarters in India. In 1939 he became Deputy Adjutant General at the War Office and in 1940 he was appointed General Officer Commanding-in-Chief Scottish Command and Governor of Edinburgh Castle: he was appointed a Knight Commander of the Order of the Bath (KCB) in the 1941 New Year Honours, before retiring later that year.

Carrington was also Colonel Commandant of the Royal Artillery from 1940 to 1950.

== Retirement ==
In retirement Carrington worked for the Ministry of Supply from 1942 to 1945. He was appointed High Sheriff of Suffolk from 1953 to 1954.

== Bibliography ==
- Smart, Nick (2005). Biographical Dictionary of British Generals of the Second World War. Barnsley, South Yorkshire: Pen and Sword Books. ISBN 1844150496.

Military offices
Preceded by Sir Charles Grant	GOC-in-C Scottish Command; 1940–1941	Succeeded by Sir Andrew Thorne
