= Nicholas Ashmore =

British Army officer

Major General Nicholas Ashmore CB OBE
- Born: September 1961 (age 65)
- Military career
- Allegiance: United Kingdom
- Branch: British Army
- Service years: 1984–2017
- Rank: Major General
- Conflicts: Iraq War
- Awards: Companion of the Order of the Bath; Officer of the Order of the British Empire

Major General Nicholas David Ashmore CB OBE (born September 1961) is a British Army officer who served as Military Secretary and General Officer Scotland.

== Military career ==
Ashmore was commissioned into the Royal Artillery on 3 January 1984. After seeing active service during the Iraq War, he became Colonel Army Plans in December 2004, Commander Royal Artillery for 3rd (UK) Division in July 2007 and Director Plans at Army Headquarters in July 2009 before becoming Director Strategic Asset-Management and Programme Team at the Defence Infrastructure Organisation in September 2011. He went on to be Military Secretary in March 2015 and, additionally, General Officer, Scotland, in July 2015.

He was appointed Officer of the Order of the British Empire (OBE) on 31 October 2003 for his service during the Iraq War and Companion of the Order of the Bath (CB) in the 2016 Birthday Honours.

Military offices
Preceded by Shaun Burley	Military Secretary; 2015–2017	Succeeded by Bob Bruce
Preceded by Nick Eeles (As General Officer Commanding Scotland)	General Officer Scotland; 2015–2017	Succeeded by Bob Bruce
