= David Young (British Army officer) =

British Army general

Lieutenant-General Sir David Young KBE CB DFC
- Born: 17 May 1926
- Died: 9 January 2000 (aged 73)
- Military career
- Allegiance: United Kingdom
- Branch: British Army
- Service years: 1945–1982
- Rank: Lieutenant-General
- Service number: 354597
- Units: Royal Scots; Glider Pilot Regiment
- Commands: General Officer Commanding Scotland; 12th Mechanised Brigade; 1st Battalion the Royal Scots
- Conflicts: Second World War; Malayan Emergency; Operation Banner
- Awards: Knight Commander of the Order of the British Empire; Companion of the Order of the Bath; Distinguished Flying Cross

Lieutenant-General Sir David Tod Young, KBE, CB, DFC (17 May 1926 – 9 January 2000) was a senior British Army officer who served as General Officer Commanding Scotland from 1980 to 1982.

== Military career ==
Educated at George Watson's College in Edinburgh, Young was commissioned into the Royal Scots in 1945. He was seconded to the Glider Pilot Regiment in 1949 and qualified as a pilot.

He served in the Malayan Emergency in the early 1950s and won his Distinguished Flying Cross in 1952 operating at low levels over rugged jungle terrain with 656 Air Observation Squadron.

He was selected to be commanding officer (CO) of the 1st Battalion, Royal Scots in 1967. In 1970 he was appointed commander of the 12th Mechanised Brigade and in 1972 he became deputy military secretary at the Ministry of Defence. He was appointed colonel of the Royal Scots in 1975. He moved on to be commander land forces at HQ Northern Ireland in 1975 at the height of the Troubles and then became director, infantry, in 1977. He was made General Officer Commanding Scotland and Governor of Edinburgh Castle in 1980, before retiring from regular service in 1982. He became colonel commandant of the Ulster Defence Regiment from 1986 to 1991.

In retirement he became chairman of Cairntech Limited. He was also chairman of the Scottish Committee of Marie Curie Cancer Care.

== Honours ==
Young was appointed a Companion (Military Division) of the Order of the Bath (CB) in the 1977 Birthday Honours, and a Knight Commander (military division) of the Order of the British Empire in the 1980 Birthday Honours.

== Family ==
He married Joyce Marian Melville in 1950; they had two sons. Following the death of his first wife, he married Joanna Oyler in 1988.

Military offices
Preceded by Sir Michael Gow	GOC Scotland; 1980−1982	Succeeded by Sir Alexander Boswell
