= Henry Leask =

British Army general

Lieutenant-General Sir Henry Leask KCB DSO OBE
- Born: 30 June 1913; Hugesovka, Russian Empire
- Died: 10 January 2004 (aged 90)
- Military career
- Allegiance: United Kingdom
- Branch: British Army
- Service years: 1936–1972
- Rank: Lieutenant-General
- Service number: 62419
- Unit: Royal Scots Fusiliers
- Commands: 8th Battalion, Argyll and Sutherland Highlanders; 1st Battalion, London Scottish; 1st Battalion, Parachute Regiment; 52nd (Lowland) Infantry Division; Scottish Command
- Conflicts: World War II
- Awards: Knight Commander of the Order of the Bath; Distinguished Service Order; Officer of the Order of the British Empire

Lieutenant-General Sir Henry Lowther Ewart Clark Leask KCB DSO OBE (30 June 1913 – 10 January 2004) was a senior British Army officer who served in World War II and held high command during the 1960s.

== Military career ==
Henry Leask was commissioned into the Royal Scots Fusiliers in 1936.

He served in the Second World War becoming commanding officer of 8th Argyll and Sutherland Highlanders in 1944. He won the DSO for on a three-mile dash to capture two bridges over the River Po at San Patrizio.

After the War, in 1946, he was appointed commanding officer of 1st London Scottish and from 1947 he was in Military Operations Directorate at the War Office. He then became commanding officer of 1st Parachute Regiment in 1952. He was appointed Assistant Military Secretary to the Secretary of State for War in 1955 and then from 1957 he was Commandant of the Tactical Wing of the School of Infantry. In 1962, he became Deputy Military Secretary to the Secretary of State for War.

He was appointed General Officer Commanding 52nd (Lowland) Infantry Division in 1964, and Director of Army Training at the Ministry of Defence in 1966. He became General Officer Commanding Scottish Command and Governor of Edinburgh Castle in 1969; he retired in 1972.

== Family ==
In 1940, he married Zoe de Camborne Paynter and together they went on to have one son and two daughters. Their son Anthony (b.1943) followed his father into the services, joining the Scots Guards and rising to the rank of Major-General, before becoming a military historian.

Military offices
| Preceded by John Frost | GOC 52nd (Lowland) Infantry Division; 1964–1966 | Succeeded by Sir James Bowes-Lyon |
| Preceded by Sir Derek Lang | GOC-in-C Scottish Command; 1969–1972 | Succeeded by Sir Chandos Blair |
