= Archibald Cameron (British Army officer) =

British Army general (1870–1944)

General Sir Archibald Cameron GBE KCB CMG
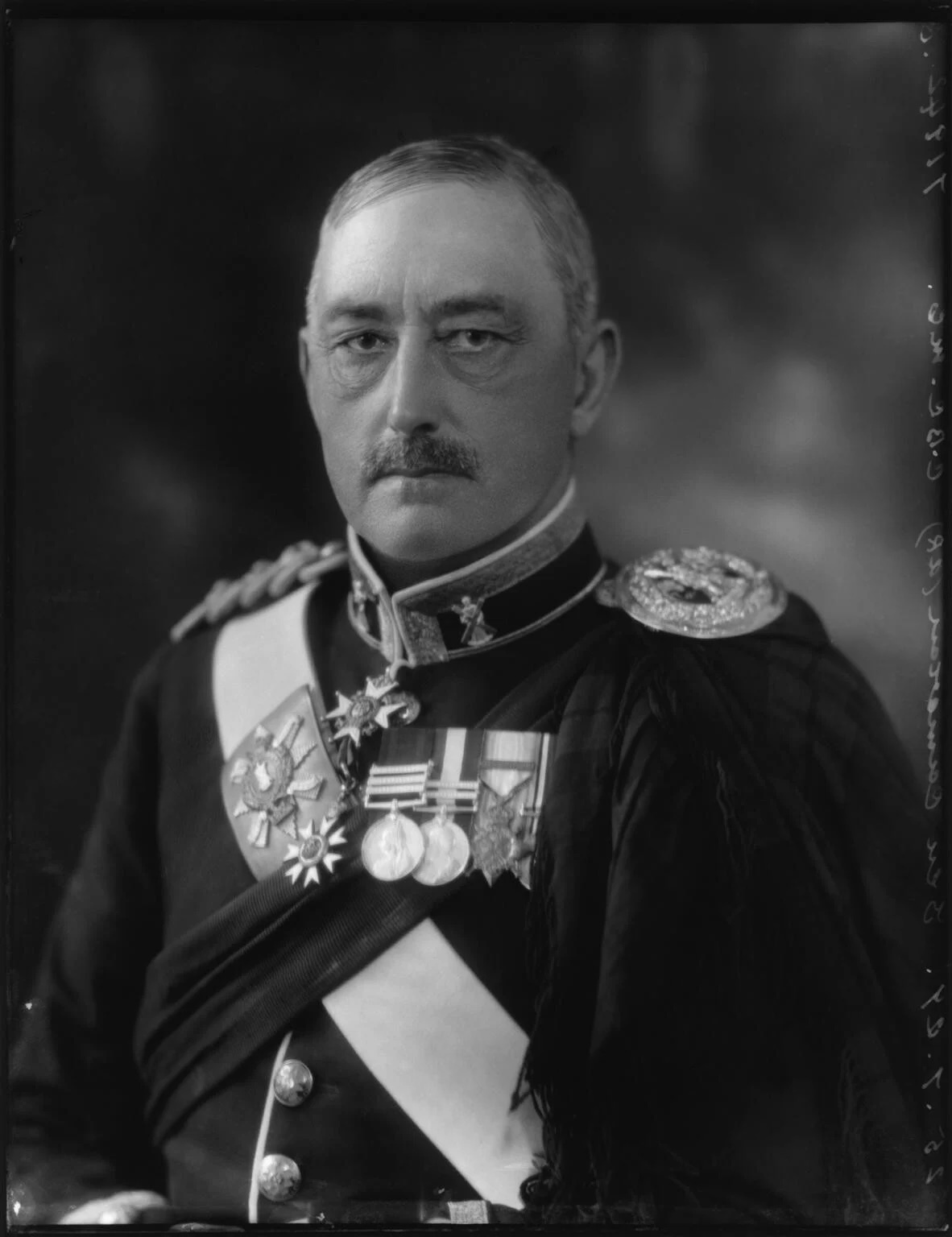
- Cameron in 1929
- Born: Archibald Rice Cameron; 28 August 1870
- Died: 18 June 1944 (aged 73)
- Military career
- Allegiance: United Kingdom
- Branch: British Army
- Service years: 1890–1937
- Rank: General
- Commands: Scottish Command; 4th Division
- Conflicts: Second Boer War; First World War
- Awards: Knight Grand Cross of the Order of the British Empire; Knight Commander of the Order of the Bath; Companion of the Order of St Michael and St George

General Sir Archibald Rice Cameron GBE KCB CMG (28 August 1870 – 18 June 1944) was a senior British Army officer who served in the Second Boer War and First World War.

== Military career ==
Educated at Haileybury College and the Royal Military College, Sandhurst, Arichibald Cameron was commissioned into the Black Watch as a second lieutenant on 1 March 1890, promoted to lieutenant on 3 August 1892, and to captain on 6 October 1899. He was appointed adjutant in the 2nd Battalion in April 1900, and with the battalion took part in the Second Boer War between 1899 and 1902, during which he received a brevet promotion as major on 29 November 1900 (gazetted in the April 1901 South Africa Honours list). Following the end of the war he left Point Natal for British India on the SS Ionian in October 1902 with other officers and men of his battalion, which after arrival in Bombay was stationed in Sialkot in Umballa in Punjab. He returned to South Africa to become military secretary to the governor of the Cape of Good Hope from 3 December 1904 to 1907.

Cameron served in the First World War, initially as a GSO2 with the 5th Division from August 1914, when he was promoted to temporary lieutenant colonel, until March 1915, and later GSO1, still with the 5th Division, from March to October 1915. Promoted to temporary brigadier general in October 1915, he became brigadier general general staff (BGGS) for X Corps, holding this position until July 1918, during which time he was advanced to brevet colonel in January 1916. After serving briefly as an additional BGGS with the Fourth Army, he was made BGGS with the British Armies in France. He was made a Companion of the Order of the Bath in January 1917.

On 16 August 1921 he was granted the substantive rank of major general. In 1922 Cameron became general officer commanding (GOC) Northern Ireland District. In 1925 he was appointed director of staff duties at the War Office moving on to be GOC 4th Division in 1927, a post he held until 1931, having been placed on half-pay in June. He took over from General Sir John Maxwell as colonel of the Black Watch after Maxwell's death in February 1929.

Promoted to lieutenant general in March 1931, he was appointed general officer commanding-in-chief (GOC-in-C) of Scottish Command in 1933 and in 1936 also became governor of Edinburgh Castle; he retired from the army in 1937.

== Family ==
Archibald Cameron never married. His niece Marion Eleanora Cameron married Harold Salvesen, a British businessman.

Military offices
New command	GOC British Army in Northern Ireland; 1922–1925	Succeeded by Sir Felix Ready
Preceded by Percy Radcliffe	GOC 4th Division; 1927–1931	Succeeded by Charles Bonham-Carter
Preceded by Sir Percy Radcliffe	GOC-in-C Scottish Command; 1933–1937	Succeeded by Sir Charles Grant
