= Alexander Boswell (British Army officer) =

British Army general (1928–2021)

Lieutenant-General Sir Alexander Boswell KCB CBE DL
- Born: 3 August 1928
- Died: 13 November 2021 (aged 93)
- Military career
- Allegiance: United Kingdom
- Branch: British Army
- Service years: 1948–1990
- Rank: Lieutenant-General
- Unit: Argyll and Sutherland Highlanders
- Commands: General Officer Commanding Scotland; 2nd Armoured Division; 39th Infantry Brigade
- Conflicts: Indonesia–Malaysia confrontation Operation Banner
- Awards: Knight Commander of the Order of the Bath; Commander of the Order of the British Empire; Mentioned in Despatches

Lieutenant-General Sir Alexander Crawford Simpson Boswell, KCB, CBE, DL (3 August 1928 – 13 November 2021) was a British Army officer. He joined the army as junior officer in the Argyll and Sutherland Highlanders shortly after the Second World War and, following a series of regimental and staff postings, was second-in-command of 1st Battalion the Argyll and Sutherland Highlanders during the Indonesia–Malaysia confrontation. He later commanded the battalion, then 39th Infantry Brigade, before taking command of the 2nd Armoured Division in 1978. He was later the General Officer Commanding in Scotland and Lieutenant Governor of Guernsey before retiring in 1990.

== Military career ==
After an education at Merchiston Castle School and the Royal Military Academy, Sandhurst, Boswell was commissioned into the Argyll and Sutherland Highlanders in 1948. He remained with his regiment until 1959, when he attended the Staff College, Camberley, and on completion of the course in 1960 was posted to the Berlin Brigade as military assistant to the commander. In 1962 he returned to his battalion as a company commander, later second-in-command, and was mentioned in despatches for his services in Borneo during the Indonesia–Malaysia confrontation. He was appointed a Member of the Order of the British Empire (MBE) in the 1962 Birthday Honours.

Following Borneo he spent four years on the staff of the Staff College, Camberley, before rejoining the Argylls in 1968 as the commanding officer, a posting he held until 1971. He was promoted to Officer of the Order of the British Empire (OBE) in the 1971 Birthday Honours. He then served on the general staff for a year before taking up the command of the 39th Infantry Brigade in 1972. The 39th Brigade was one of the units permanently stationed in Northern Ireland during the Troubles, and for his work there Boswell was appointed a Commander of the Order of the British Empire (CBE) in 1974.

In 1974 he was appointed chief of staff to I (British) Corps in Germany, then posted to Canada, before becoming General Officer Commanding 2nd Armoured Division in 1978. He held divisional command until 1980, when he was appointed Director of the Territorial Army and of Cadets. In 1982 he was appointed the General Officer Commanding in Scotland and Governor of Edinburgh Castle, then in 1985 Lieutenant Governor of Guernsey, before retiring in 1990. He was appointed a Knight Commander of the Order of the Bath (KCB) in the 1982 Birthday Honours.

From 1972 to 1982 he was the Colonel of the Regiment of the Argyll and Sutherland Highlanders, and from 1982 to 1986 the Colonel Commandant of the Scottish Division. In 1993 he was appointed a Deputy Lieutenant for East Lothian.

Boswell was appointed a Knight of the Order of St John in 1985.

== Personal life ==
Boswell was predeceased by his wife in 2018. He died on 13 November 2021, at the age of 93.

== Notes ==
Notes

Bibliography

- "BOSWELL, Lt-Gen. Sir Alexander (Crawford Simpson)". (2010). In Who's Who. Online edition.

Military offices
Preceded by Frank Kitson	General Officer Commanding the 2nd Armoured Division; 1978–1980	Succeeded by Martin Farndale
Preceded by Sir David Young	GOC Scotland; 1982–1985	Succeeded by Sir Norman Arthur
Government offices
Preceded by Sir Peter Le Cheminant	Lieutenant Governor of Guernsey; 1985–1990	Succeeded by Sir Michael Wilkins
