= Thomas Napier (British Army officer) =

General Sir Thomas Napier KCB
- Born: 10 May 1790; Govan, Lanarkshire, Scotland
- Died: 5 July 1863 (aged 73); Lasswade, Midlothian, Scotland
- Relatives: Sir William Napier (cousin)
- Military career
- Allegiance: United Kingdom
- Branch: British Army
- Service years: 1805–1863
- Rank: General
- Units: 52nd Regiment of Foot; Chasseurs Britanniques
- Commands: Commander-in-Chief, Scotland
- Conflicts: Napoleonic Wars; Copenhagen Expedition; Battle of Køge; Peninsular War; Battle of Corunna; Siege of Cádiz; Battle of Fuentes de Oñoro; Siege of Badajoz; Battle of Salamanca; Siege of Burgos; Battle of Vittoria; Battle of the Pyrenees; Battle of Nivelle; Battle of the Nive (WIA); Battle of Bayonne

General Sir Thomas Erskine Napier KCB (10 May 1790 – 5 July 1863) was a British Army officer who became Commander-in-Chief, Scotland.

== Military career ==
Napier was commissioned into the 52nd Regiment of Foot on 3 July 1805. He took part in the Battle of Copenhagen in August 1807, at the Battle of Corunna in January 1809 and at the Battle of Fuentes de Oñoro in May 1811 during the Napoleonic Wars. He also took part in the Battle of the Nive in December 1813 where he was wounded. He went on to be assistant adjutant-general in Belfast and then served as Commander-in-Chief, Scotland and also as Governor of Edinburgh Castle from 1852 to 1854. From 1854 to 1857 he was Colonel of the 16th (Bedfordshire) Regiment and from 1857 to his death Colonel of the 71st (Highland) Regiment of Foot.

He was the brother of Admiral Sir Charles Napier.

Military offices
Preceded by Henry Riddell	Commander-in-Chief, Scotland; 1852–1854	Succeeded by The Viscount Melville
Preceded by Henry Riddell	Governor of Edinburgh Castle; 1852–1854	Succeeded by The Viscount Melville
Preceded by Sir James Macdonell	Colonel of the 71st (Highland) Regiment of Foot; 1857–1863	Succeeded by Hon. Charles Grey
Preceded by William Beresford, 1st Viscount Beresford	Colonel of the 16th (Bedfordshire) Regiment; 1854–1857	Succeeded by Cecil Bisshopp
