= 23rd Infantry Brigade (United Kingdom) =

Infantry brigade of the British Army

23rd Infantry Brigade Canal Brigade 23rd Brigade
- Brigade insignia as part of the 8th Division
- Active: 1900–1902; October 1914–November 1918 before 1930–1945
- Country: United Kingdom
- Branch: British Army
- Type: Infantry
- Size: Brigade
- Part of: 8th Division; Chindits
- Engagements: First World War; Battle of Neuve Chapelle; Battle of Aubers Ridge; Battle of the Somme; Battle of Passchendaele; Second World War; Siege of Tobruk; Battle of Kohima

Commanders
- Notable commanders: Alexander Galloway; Richard George Collingwood

The 23rd Infantry Brigade was an infantry brigade of the British Army that saw active service in the Second Boer War and the First World War, mainly on the Western Front. During the Second World War, the brigade saw active service in the Syria-Lebanon Campaign, the Western Desert Campaign, and the Burma Campaign.

== History ==
=== Second Boer War ===
A 23rd Brigade was formed as part of the 10th Division during the Second Boer War, serving in South Africa with Colonel William Knox in command from April 1900.

=== First World War ===
==== Order of battle ====
- 2nd Battalion, Devonshire Regiment
- 2nd Battalion, West Yorkshire Regiment
- 2nd Battalion, Cameronians (Scottish Rifles) (left February 1918)
- 2nd Battalion, Middlesex Regiment
- 1/6th Battalion, Cameronians (Scottish Rifles) (from March to June 1915)
- 1/7th Battalion, Middlesex Regiment (from March 1915 to February 1916)
- 23rd Machine Gun Company, Machine Gun Corps (formed 15 January 1916, moved to 8th Battalion, Machine Gun Corps 20 January 1918)
- 23rd Trench Mortar Battery (formed January 1916)

==== Commanders ====
The commanders of the 23rd Infantry Brigade during the First World War were:

- Brigadier-General F. A. Adam (24 September 1914)
- Brigadier-General R. J. Pinney (28 October 1914)
- Brigadier-General T. E. Travers-Clarke (28 July 1915)
- Brigadier-General H. D. Tuson (8 September 1915)
- Brigadier-General E. A. Fagan (27 August 1916)
- Lieutenant-Colonel J. Hamilton-Hall (2 March 1917 - acting)
- Brigadier-General G. W. St. G. Grogan (12 March 1917)

=== Second World War ===
During the inter-war period, the Canal Brigade had been formed to defend the Suez Canal. After the outbreak of the Second World War, the brigade was redesignated as the 23rd Infantry Brigade on 20 September 1939. It was dispersed in the canal area, and became part of HQ Canal sub-Area troops. In May 1941, the brigade was re-formed to take part in the Syria-Lebanon Campaign, during June and July 1941, as part of 6th Infantry Division. In October 1941, the 6th Infantry Division was re-designated as the 70th Infantry Division. The division, including the brigade, was transported to Tobruk to relieve the 9th Australian Infantry Division. As part of the Tobruk garrison, the brigade helped to fend off Rommel's Axis forces until the siege was relieved at the end of the year during Operation Crusader.

In March 1942, the 70th Infantry Division arrived in India. Its brigades, including the 23rd Infantry Brigade, were assigned to the Chindits. The brigade was retrained as a long range penetration unit. The brigade did not take part in the Second Chindit Expedition. Instead, it was deployed during the Battle of Kohima behind Japanese lines, and interdicted Japanese communication and supplies.

==== Commanders ====
- Brigadier W. T. Brooks 1939 - 1940
- Brigadier J. T. Leslie 1940
- Brigadier Alexander Galloway 1941
- Lieutenant-Colonel R. F. Heyworth
- Brigadier C. H. V. Cox 1941 - 1943
- Lieutenant-Colonel E. W. Towsey 1943
- Brigadier P. C. Marindin 1943
- Brigadier L. E. C. M. Perowne 1943 - 1945
- Brigadier R. G. Collingwood 1945

==== Order of battle ====
- 1st Battalion, Royal Sussex Regiment (from 3 September 1939 to 14 August 1940)
- 1st Battalion, Essex Regiment (from 3 September 1939 to 22 January 1940, rejoined 17 October 1941 to 17 June 1945)
- 2nd Battalion, Rifle Brigade (Prince Consort's Own) (from 7 January 1940 to 18 January 1941)
- 1st Battalion, Durham Light Infantry (from 31 January to 21 July 1940, rejoined 5 June 1941 to 22 January 1942)
- 2nd Battalion, Black Watch (Royal Highland Regiment) (from 5 April to 1 July 1940)
- 1st Battalion, Hampshire Regiment (from 2 June to 14 August 1940)
- 2nd Battalion, Highland Light Infantry (from 22 July to 14 August 1940)
- 1st Battalion, Buffs (Royal East Kent Regiment) (from 16 May to 4 June 1941)
- 4th Battalion, Border Regiment (from 29 May 1941 to 28 October 1944)
- 11th Czech Battalion (from 30 May to 6 October 1941)
- 23rd Infantry Brigade Anti-Tank Company (formed 23 September 1941, disbanded 16 February 1942)
- 1st Battalion, Sherwood Foresters (from 3 to 24 February 1942)
- 1st Battalion, South Staffordshire Regiment (from 3 to 14 February 1942)
- 2nd Battalion, Duke of Wellington's Regiment (from 19 October 1943 to 28 October 1944)
- 2nd Battalion, Queen's Royal Regiment (West Surrey) (from 24 October 1944 to 17 June 1945)
- 3rd Battalion, 9th Gurkha Rifles (from 12 November 1944 to 13 June 1945)
- 12th Battalion, Nigeria Regiment (from 15 November 1944 to 7 March 1945)
- 3rd Battalion, 6th Gurkha Rifles (from 27 March to 16 June 1945)
- 3rd Battalion, 4th Gurkha Rifles (from 28 March to 13 June 1945)
- 2nd Battalion, King's Own Scottish Borderers (from 18 to 31 August 1945)
- 2nd Battalion, South Lancashire Regiment (from 19 to 31 August 1945)

==== Chindit units ====
- 1st Battalion, Essex Regiment:Columns 44, 56
- 2nd Battalion, Duke of Wellington's Regiment: Columns 33, 76
- 4th Battalion, Border Regiment:Columns 34, 55
- 60th (North Midland) Field Regiment, Royal Artillery: Columns 60, 68 (fighting as infantry)
- 12th Field Company Royal Engineers & Medical Detachment: Support
