= Jonathan Hall (British Army officer) =

British Army general (born 1944)

Major-General Jonathan Hall CB OBE OStJ DL
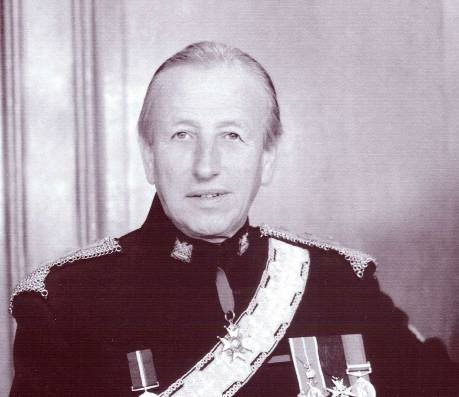
- Hall in the uniform of colonel of the Royal Scots Dragoon Guards (Carabiniers and Greys)
- Born: 10 August 1944 (age 82)
- Military career
- Allegiance: United Kingdom
- Branch: British Army
- Service years: 1965–1997
- Rank: Major-General
- Service number: 480320
- Unit: 3rd Carabiniers
- Commands: Royal Scots Dragoon Guards; 12th Armoured Brigade; General Officer Commanding Scotland
- Awards: Companion of the Order of the Bath; Officer of the Order of the British Empire

Major-General Jonathan Michael Francis Cooper Hall CB OBE OStJ DL (born 10 August 1944) is a retired British Army officer, who served as the General Officer Commanding Scotland and the Governor of Edinburgh Castle from 1995 to 1997.

== Career ==
Educated at Taunton School and the Royal Military Academy Sandhurst, Hall was commissioned into the 3rd Carabiniers in 1965. He was appointed commanding officer of the Royal Scots Dragoon Guards in 1984. He went on to command the 12th Armoured Brigade in 1989 and was appointed Deputy Military Secretary in 1992. He was appointed General Officer Commanding Scotland and Governor of Edinburgh Castle in 1995 and retired in 1997.

On leaving the Army in 1997, he was selected for the post of Lieutenant Governor (CEO equivalent), Accounting Officer and ex-officio Commissioner of the Royal Hospital Chelsea. He was also given the colonelcy in 1998 of the Royal Scots Dragoon Guards, a position he held until 2003.

In 1999, he was appointed a member of Her Majesty's Body Guard of the Honourable Corps of Gentlemen at Arms and was involved in the Queen's Diamond Jubilee celebrations as well as the Wedding of Prince William and Catherine Middleton. He was promoted to Standard Bearer in August 2012.

He was appointed Officer of the Order of the British Empire (OBE) in 1987, a Companion of the Order of the Bath (CB) in 1998, and Knight Commander of the Order of Francis I in 2014.

== Family ==
In 1968 he married Sarah Linda Hudson: they have two daughters.

Military offices
Preceded by Michael Scott	GOC Scotland; 1995–1997	Succeeded by Mark Strudwick
