= William Turner (British Army officer) =

British Army General

Lieutenant-General Sir William Turner KBE CB DSO
- Born: 1907
- Died: 1989 (aged 81–82)
- Military career
- Allegiance: United Kingdom
- Branch: British Army
- Service years: 1928–1964
- Rank: Lieutenant-General
- Service number: 39501
- Unit: King's Own Scottish Borderers
- Commands: Scottish Command (1961–1964); 44th (Home Counties) Division (1956–1959); 128th Infantry Brigade (1952–1954); British Military Mission to Greece (1950–1952); 1st Battalion, King's Own Scottish Borderers (1945–1946); 5th Battalion, King's Own Scottish Borderers (1942–1945)
- Conflicts: Second World War; Palestine Emergency
- Awards: Knight Commander of the Order of the British Empire; Companion of the Order of the Bath; Distinguished Service Order
- Other work: Governor of Edinburgh Castle

Lieutenant-General Sir William Francis Robert Turner, KBE, CB, DSO (1907–1989) was a senior British Army officer active during the Second World War and the late 1950s and early 1960s.

== Military career ==
William Turner was commissioned into the King's Own Scottish Borderers in 1928. He served in the Second World War with his regiment, which formed part of the British Expeditionary Force to France in 1939. He was commandant of the Junior Leaders School from 1940 to 1941. In 1942 he was appointed commanding officer of 5th Battalion, King's Own Scottish Borderers, a post he held for the remainder of the war.

After the war Turner went with his regiment to Palestine. He then held various general staff officer positions before becoming commander of the British Military Mission to Greece in 1950. He was then made commander of the 128th Infantry Brigade in 1952. He was brigadier on the general staff at Headquarters Western Command from 1954 and was then appointed general officer commanding of the 44th (Home Counties) Division and Home Counties District in 1956. He was also Deputy Constable of Dover Castle at that time.

In 1959 Turner became president of the Regular Commissions Board and in 1961 he was appointed general officer commanding-in-chief Scottish Command and Governor of Edinburgh Castle: he retired in 1964.

Military offices
Preceded by Robert King	GOC 44th (Home Counties) Division; 1956–1959	Succeeded by Paul Gleadell
Preceded by Sir George Collingwood	GOC-in-C Scottish Command; 1961–1964	Succeeded by Sir George Gordon-Lennox
