= David Shaw (British Army officer) =

Major General David Shaw CBE
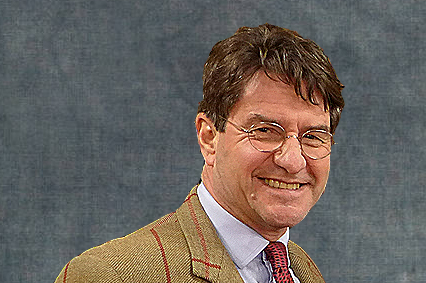
- Born: 19 February 1957 (age 69); Ceylon
- Military career
- Allegiance: United Kingdom
- Branch: British Army
- Service years: 1976–2012
- Rank: Major General
- Service number: 501691
- Commands: 2nd Division; 15 (North East) Brigade
- Conflicts: Bosnian War; Operation Banner
- Awards: Commander of the Order of the British Empire

Major General David Anthony Hirst Shaw, CBE (born 19 February 1957) is a former British Army officer who commanded the 2nd Division from 2009 to 2012.

== Military career ==
Brought up in Sri Lanka, Shaw was commissioned into the Royal Artillery in 1976. He went on to take part in operations in Cyprus, Bosnia and Northern Ireland. He was promoted to brigadier and appointed to command 15 (North East) Brigade in 2002, before becoming Assistant Chief of Staff, Communications in 2004 and Director of Media and Communication at HQ Land Forces in 2007. He took up the post of General Officer Commanding 2nd Division and Governor of Edinburgh Castle in 2009.

Shaw was appointed a Commander of the Order of the British Empire in the 2012 New Year Honours. He retired from the army on 17 February 2012.

== Charities ==
Shaw is co-founder and has been Chair and then CEO of Launchpad (2013), a charity based in Newcastle, Liverpool and Durham that helps mostly homeless veterans make a successful transition to more stable civilian life. Launchpad was visited by Prince Harry in early 2015. Shaw also founded the Veterans' Foundation in 2016 and was CEO until 2025, by which time it had raised significant money for other armed forces' charities and charitable activities.

== Other Facts ==
Shaw is now an artist, studying at the Leith School of Art (2025-2026).

Military offices
Preceded by Andrew Mackay	General Officer Commanding 2nd Division; 2009–2012	Succeeded by Nick Eeles
