= Percy Radcliffe (British Army officer) =

British Army general

General Sir Percy Radcliffe KCB KCMG DSO
- Born: 9 February 1874
- Died: 9 February 1934 (aged 60)
- Military career
- Allegiance: United Kingdom
- Branch: British Army
- Service years: 1893–1934
- Rank: General
- Commands: Southern Command; Scottish Command; 4th Division; 48th (South Midland) Division
- Conflicts: Second Boer War; First World War
- Awards: Knight Commander of the Order of the Bath; Knight Commander of the Order of St Michael and St George; Distinguished Service Order; Mentioned in Despatches (7)

General Sir Percy Pollexfen de Blaquiere Radcliffe, KCB, KCMG, DSO (9 February 1874 – 9 February 1934) was a British Army officer who reached high office in the 1930s.

== Early life ==
Radcliffe was born on 9 February 1874. His parents were W. Pollexfen Radcliffe and Isabel de Blaquiere. He was educated at Winchester College and the Royal Military Academy.

== Military career ==
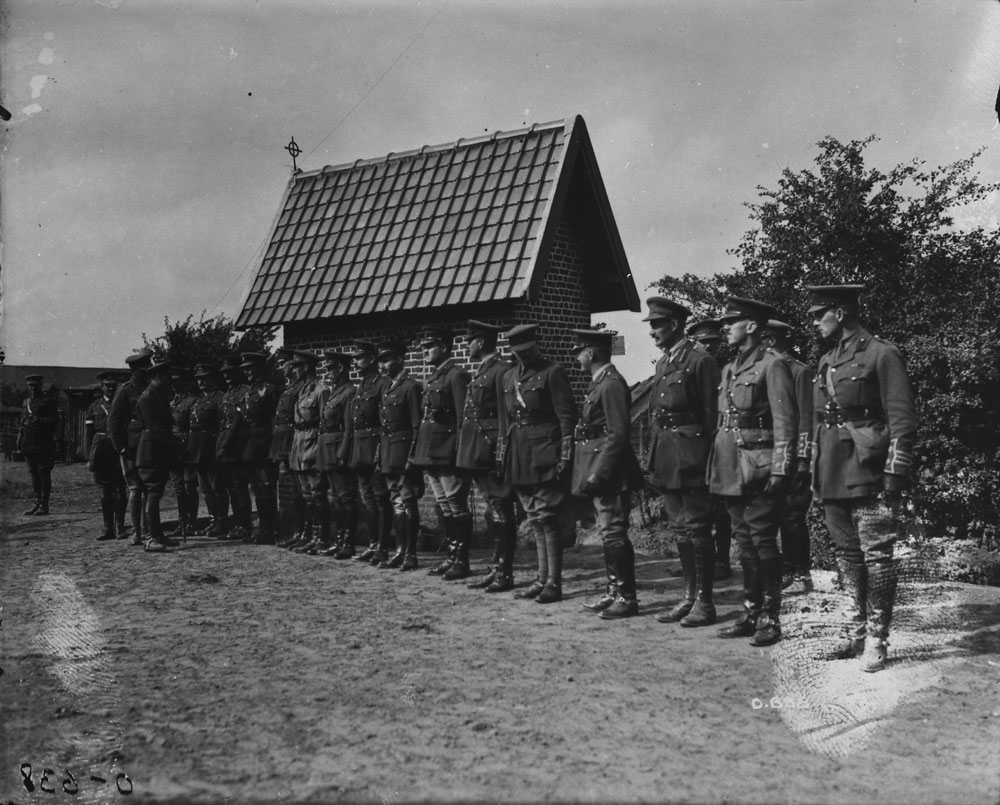
Officers of the Canadian Corps being presented to King George V, August 1916. Brigadier General Radcliffe is stood tenth on the left.

Radcliffe was commissioned into the Royal Artillery in 1893. He saw service with 'G' Battery, Royal Horse Artillery in the Second Boer War between 1899 and 1900, was mentioned in dispatches, and was promoted to captain in 1900 and then, in January 1906, succeeded Neill Malcolm as a staff captain at the War Office.

Promoted to major in October 1910, in October 1911 he was made a general staff officer, grade 2, taking over from Lieutenant Colonel Hugh Bruce Williams.

He saw active service during the First World War on the Western Front, and was appointed a general staff officer, grade 1 in July 1915. He was made a brevet lieutenant colonel in June 1915, lieutenant colonel in 1916 and a brevet colonel the following year. He was mentioned in dispatches six times during the war. When William Robertson was replaced as Chief of the Imperial General Staff in early 1918 by Sir Henry Wilson, Radcliffe, promoted in June 1918 to substantive major general, was appointed director of military operations at the War Office. He replaced Major General Frederick Maurice.

Radcliffe continued in the role until 1922. He was appointed General Officer Commanding 48th (South Midland) Division in 1923, General Officer Commanding 4th Division in 1926 and General Officer Commanding-in-Chief of Scottish Command in 1930. His final appointment was as General Officer Commanding-in-Chief of Southern Command from 1933 until his death, when he fell from a horse and had a heart attack, on his sixtieth birthday, in 1934.

Radcliffe was aide-de-camp general to King George V from 1 October 1933, when he succeeded General Sir William Thwaites, until his death.

== Personal life ==
Radcliffe married twice – first to Rahmeh Theodora Swinburne in 1918 and then to Florence Alice Coromandel Tagg in 1932. From 1905 to 1934 Radcliffe owned a house in Menton in the south of France. The garden, which he landscaped and curated, is now Menton's botanical garden. It is named the Jardin botanique Val Rahmeh after his first wife.

== Works ==
- Tactical Employment of Field Artillery (which he translated from the French).
- Report on the Franco-British Mission to Poland, July, August 1920.

Military offices
Preceded by Sir Harold Walker	GOC 48th (South Midland) Division; 1918–1923	Succeeded by Thomas Pitman
Preceded by Reginald Stephens	GOC 4th Division; 1926–1927	Succeeded by Archibald Cameron
Preceded by Sir William Peyton	GOC-in-C Scottish Command; 1930–1933	Succeeded by Sir Archibald Cameron
Preceded by Sir Cecil Romer	GOC-in-C Southern Command; 1933–1934	Succeeded by Sir John Burnett-Stuart
