= Harry Grimshaw =

British Army general (1911–2007)

Major-General Harry Grimshaw CB CBE DSO
- Born: 30 June 1911; India
- Died: 1 November 2007 (aged 96); Amesbury Abbey
- Military career
- Allegiance: United Kingdom
- Branch: British Indian Army; British Army
- Service years: 1931–1965
- Rank: Major-General
- Service number: 50117
- Units: 1st Punjab Regiment; Royal Inniskilling Fusiliers
- Commands: 44th (Home Counties) Division; 19th Infantry Brigade; 1st Battalion, Royal Inniskilling Fusiliers; 161st Indian Infantry Brigade; 1st Battalion, 1st Punjab Regiment
- Conflicts: Second World War; Battle of Kohima; Malayan Emergency; Mau Mau uprising; Suez Crisis
- Awards: Companion of the Order of the Bath; Commander of the Order of the British Empire; Distinguished Service Order; Mentioned in Despatches (2)

Major-General Ewing Henry Wrigley Grimshaw, CB, CBE, DSO (30 June 1911 – 1 November 2007) was a senior British Indian Army and British Army officer who served in the Second World War and achieved high office in the 1960s.

== Early life ==
Grimshaw was born in India, the son of an army officer. He was educated at Brighton College before attending the Royal Military College, Sandhurst.

== Military career ==
On 29 January 1931, Grimshaw commissioned into the 1st Punjab Regiment, garrisoned in India. He first saw active service in the Waziristan campaign (1936–39) and against terrorists in Bengal. In 1939, Grimshaw was serving with the 1st Battalion, 1st Punjab Regiment, and was posted with it to Iraq and Libya. He fought in the Western Desert campaign, during which he was mentioned in despatches, before his unit was transferred to Burma in early 1943.

By April 1944, Grimshaw was commanding officer of the 1st Battalion of the 1st Punjab Regiment. On 18 April, he was one of the first soldiers to enter Kohima Garrison, breaking the siege during the Battle of Kohima. He was mentioned in despatches for a second time during the Burma campaign. In March 1945, he was promoted to brigadier and took command of the 161st Indian Infantry Brigade, holding the position for a year. In June 1945, he was awarded the Distinguished Service Order for services in Burma.

In October 1947, Grimshaw transferred to the Royal Inniskilling Fusiliers, and in 1948, he served with the regiment during the early stages of the Malayan Emergency. In 1952, he commanded the 1st Battalion of the regiment in the Canal Zone before leading the battalion during operations in the Mau Mau uprising in Kenya. At the conclusion of this tour, his battalion was awarded the Freedom of Nairobi, and as commanding officer he was made an Officer of the Order of the British Empire.

Grimshaw's next posting was to HQ Northern Ireland as chief of staff, but this posting was shortened by his appointment to command the 19th Infantry Brigade at four days notice. Grimshaw was deployed with the brigade to Egypt during the Suez Crisis of 1956, and he was the last British soldier to leave Port Said, having handed over to the United Nations Force Commander. In 1957, he was advanced to Commander of the Order of the British Empire. Grimshaw commanded the brigade in Cyprus in operations against EOKA in 1958. This was followed by a staff appointment in the War Office, after which he was promoted to major general. His final commanded was of the 44th (Home Counties) Division in 1962, which carried with it the appointment of Deputy Constable of Dover Castle. He was appointed a Companion of the Order of the Bath in 1965, when he retired.

Appointed on 1 September, between 1966 and 1968 he was Colonel of the Royal Inniskilling Fusiliers.

== Personal life ==
In 1943, Grimshaw married Hilda Allison, who died in 1993. They had two sons and a daughter; his elder son, Colonel Ewing Grimshaw, died in 1996.

== Bibliography ==
- Edwards, Leslie (2009). Kohima: The Furthest Battle – The Story of the Japanese Invasion of India in 1944 and the Battle of Kohima. Stroud: The History Press. ISBN 978-1-86227-488-4.

Military offices
Preceded by Paul Gleadell	GOC 44th (Home Counties) Division; 1962–1965	Succeeded by Brian Wyldbore-Smith
