= Euan Loudon =

British Army general (born 1956)

Major General Euan Loudon CBE
- Born: 12 March 1956 (age 70); Hamilton, Lanarkshire
- Military career
- Allegiance: United Kingdom
- Branch: British Army
- Service years: 1975–2007
- Rank: Major General
- Unit: Royal Highland Fusiliers
- Commands: 2nd Infantry Division; 39th Infantry Brigade; 1st Battalion, Royal Highland Fusiliers
- Conflicts / operations: Gulf War; The Troubles; Operation Banner
- Awards: Commander of the Order of the British Empire; Queen's Commendation for Valuable Service

Major General William Euan Buchanan Loudon, CBE (born 12 March 1956) is a former British Army officer who commanded the 2nd Division from 2004 to 2007.

== Military career ==
Loudon was commissioned into the Royal Highland Fusiliers in 1975 and later commanded the 1st Battalion of his regiment. In 1991 he served in the Gulf War as the chief of staff of 7th Armoured Brigade (Desert Rats). He was appointed an Officer of the Order of the British Empire for his operational service in the Gulf War. He was appointed commander of the 39th Infantry Brigade in 1999, and chief of staff at HQ Northern Ireland in 2001, for which he was awarded a Queen's Commendation for Valuable Service in 2002 and advanced to Commander of the Order of the British Empire in 2004. He was appointed General Officer Commanding 2nd Division and Governor of Edinburgh Castle in 2004, before he retired in early 2007.

== Business career ==
Loudon became Chief Executive and Producer of the Royal Edinburgh Military Tattoo in 2007 and then Chief Executive of the St Andrews Links Trust in 2011. He was appointed Chairman of the St Andrews Links Limited and The Castle Course Limited in 2012 and the following year he became Chairman of Tom Morris International. He retired from the St Andrews Links Trust in December 2021.

Military offices
Preceded by Nick Parker	General Officer Commanding 2nd Division; 2004–2007	Succeeded by David McDowall
