= Nick Eeles =

British Army officer (born 1961)

Major General Nick Eeles CBE
- Born: 24 April 1961 (age 65); Lyndhurst, Hampshire, England
- Military career
- Allegiance: United Kingdom
- Branch: British Army
- Service years: 1982–2015
- Rank: Major General
- Commands: General Officer Commanding Scotland; 2nd Division; 26th Regiment Royal Artillery
- Conflicts: Bosnian War; Operation Banner; Kosovo War
- Awards: Commander of the Order of the British Empire

Major General Nicholas Henry Eeles, CBE (born 24 April 1961) is a British Army officer who served as General Officer Commanding Scotland from 2012 to 2015.

== Military career ==
Educated at the University of Bristol, Eeles was commissioned into the Royal Artillery in 1982. In 1994 he was deployed to Bosnia as chief of staff in the British headquarters of United Nations Protection Force. He then commanded C Battery Royal Horse Artillery, in which role he was deployed to Northern Ireland. He was appointed commanding officer of 26th Regiment Royal Artillery in 2001 and commanded his regiment in Germany, Kosovo and Bosnia before preparing for operations in Iraq. He went on to be Commander Royal Artillery of 3rd Division in April 2005, Brigadier on the general staff in the Ministry of Defence in June 2007 and Director Royal Artillery in January 2010.

Eeles was appointed General Officer Commanding 2nd Infantry Division and Governor of Edinburgh Castle on 4 January 2012 and, following the disbanding of the 2nd Infantry Division on 1 April 2012, he became General Officer Commanding Scotland on 2 April 2012.

Eeles was appointed a Commander of the Order of the British Empire in the 2014 New Year Honours.

Military offices
Preceded by David Shaw	General Officer Commanding 2nd Division; January–March 2012	Division disbanded
New command	General Officer Commanding Scotland; 2012–2015	Succeeded by Nicholas Ashmore (As General Officer, Scotland)
