= Scottish Command =

Scottish Command (from 1972 Army Headquarters Scotland)
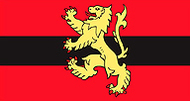
- Active: 1905–1972; 2012–2014
- Country: United Kingdom
- Branch: British Army
- Type: Command
- Garrison/HQ: Edinburgh

Scottish Command or Army Headquarters Scotland (from 1972) was a command of the British Army. The successor role, since 2015, has been the Military Secretary and General Officer, Scotland.

== History ==
=== Early history ===
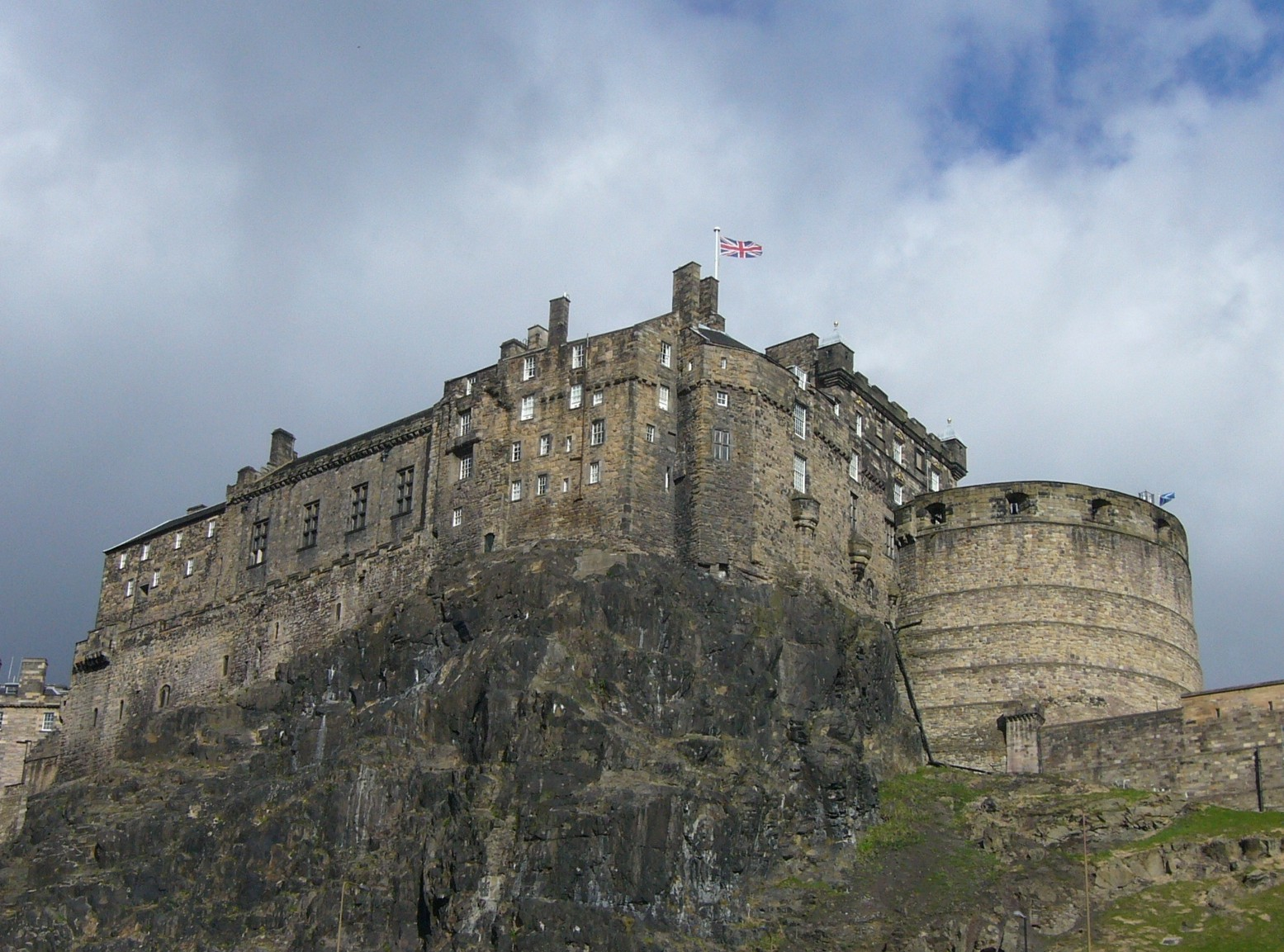
Edinburgh Castle, command headquarters from 1905 to 1955

Great Britain was divided into military districts on the outbreak of war with France in 1793. The Scottish District was commanded by the Commander-in-Chief, Scotland. In January 1876 a ‘Mobilization Scheme for the forces in Great Britain and Ireland’ was published, with the ‘Active Army’ divided into eight army corps based on the District Commands. 8th Corps was to be formed within Scottish Command, based at Edinburgh. This scheme disappeared in 1881, when the districts were retitled ‘District Commands.

=== Early twentieth century ===
The 1901 Army Estimates introduced by St John Brodrick allowed for six army corps based on six regional commands. As outlined in a paper published in 1903, VI Corps was to be formed in a reconstituted Scottish Command, with HQ at Edinburgh. Lieutenant General Sir Charles Tucker was appointed acting General Officer Commanding-in-Chief (GOCinC) of VI Corps in April 1903. Scottish Command was established in 1905 at Edinburgh Castle but moved to Craigiehall in 1955.

=== First World War ===
Army Order No 324, issued on 21 August 1914, authorised the formation of a 'New Army' of six Divisions, manned by volunteers who had responded to Earl Kitchener's appeal (hence the First New Army was known as 'K1'). Each division was to be under the administration of one of the Home Commands, and Scottish Command formed what became the 9th (Scottish) Division. It was followed by 15th (Scottish) Division of K2 in September 1914. The 64th (2nd Highland) Division was established in the Command by 1915 after the departure of 51st (Highland) Division for France.

=== Second World War ===
In September 1939 consisted of Highland Area with 9th (Highland) Infantry Division and 51st (Highland) Infantry Division, and Lowland Area with 15th (Scottish) Infantry Division and 52nd (Lowland) Infantry Division, plus other troops. By 1940 during the Battle of Britain the command was responsible to Commander-in-Chief, Home Forces.

As France was capitulating, General Władysław Sikorski. the Polish commander-in-chief and prime minister, was able to evacuate many Polish troops—probably over 20,000—to the United Kingdom. After initially regrouping in southern Scotland these Polish ground units (as I Corps, comprising the 1st Independent Rifle Brigade, the 10th Motorised Cavalry Brigade (as infantry) and cadre brigades largely manned by surplus officers at battalion strength) took over responsibility in October 1940 for the defence of the counties of Fife and Angus; this included reinforcing coastal defences that had already been started. I Corps was under the direct command of Scottish Command. While in this area the Corps was reorganised and expanded.

=== Post War ===
In 1950, the 51st/52nd (Scottish) Division was split, restoring the independence of the 52nd Lowland Division, which took regional command of Territorial Army units based in the Scottish Lowlands, including the Territorial infantry battalions of the Lowland Brigade regiments.

In 1948, the 9th Special Communications Unit was formed in Forfar administered by Scottish Command. The 30th Armoured Brigade was reformed in Scotland after the war as a fully Territorial Army formation, known as the 30th (Lowland) Independent Armoured Brigade. It was headquartered in Glasgow.

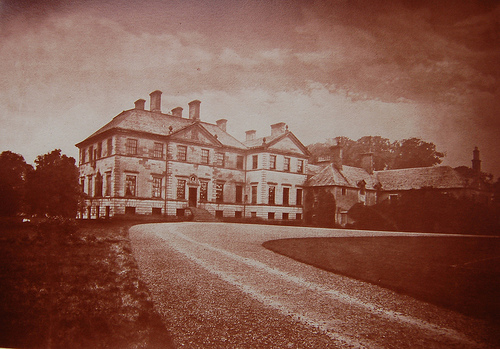
Craigiehall, command headquarters from 1955 to 2000

In 1955, Headquarters Scottish Command moved into modern facilities at Craigiehall, close to Cramond, around 9 km (5.6 mi) west of central Edinburgh. At this time, the General Officer Commanding-in-Chief had 92 separate locations under his command, with 2,500 regular service men and women and 8,800 members of the Territorial Army, representing 14% of the total across the UK.

The Command was merged into HQ United Kingdom Land Forces (HQ UKLF) in 1972 and the headquarters in Scotland was downgraded to the status of a district, known as Army Headquarters Scotland. Scotland continued to have district status until 2000 when the last General Officer Commanding Scotland stood down and the Army HQ Scotland was replaced by HQ 2nd Infantry Division with control of troops in Scotland and the North of England.

== General Officers Commanding ==
Commanders-in-Chief have included:

=== Commander-in-Chief, Scottish Army ===
- 1661–1663: John Middleton, 1st Earl of Middleton
- 1663–1667: John Leslie, 7th Earl of Rothes
- 1667–1674: George Livingston, 3rd Earl of Linlithgow (acting)
- 1674–1677: Sir George Munro
- 1677–1679: George Livingston, 3rd Earl of Linlithgow
- 1679–1679: James Scott, 1st Duke of Monmouth
- 1679–1685: Tam Dalyell of the Binns
- 1685–1685: George Douglas, 1st Earl of Dumbarton
- 1685–1688: William Drummond, 1st Viscount Strathallan
- 1688–1688: James Douglas
- 1689–1690: Hugh Mackay
- 1690–1697: Thomas Livingstone, 1st Viscount Teviot

=== Commander-in-Chief, Scotland (or North Britain) ===
- 1702–1705: George Ramsay
- 1706–1710: David Leslie, 3rd Earl of Leven
- 1710–1712: David Colyear, 1st Earl of Portmore
- 1712–1716: John Campbell, 2nd Duke of Argyll
- 1716–1724: George Carpenter, 1st Baron Carpenter
- 1724–1740: George Wade
- ...
- 1743–1745: Sir John Cope
- 1745–1745: Roger Handasyd
- 1745–1746: Henry Hawley (Prince William, Duke of Cumberland in overall command)
- 1746–1747: William Anne Keppel, 2nd Earl of Albemarle
- 1747–1752: Humphrey Bland
- 1752–1753: George Churchill
- 1753–1756: Humphrey Bland
- 1756–1767: Lord George Beauclerk
- 1767–1778: John Campbell, Marquess of Lorne
- 1778–1780: Sir James Adolphus Oughton
- 1780–1787: Alexander Mackay
- ...
- 1789–1798: Lord Adam Gordon
- 1798–1799: Sir Ralph Abercromby
- ...
- 1803–1806: Francis Rawdon-Hastings, 2nd Earl of Moira
- 1806–1812: William Cathcart, 1st Viscount Cathcart
- 1812–1816: Henry Wynyard
- 1816–1819: Sir John Hope
- 1819–1825: Lieutenant-General Sir Thomas Bradford
- 1825–1830: Lieutenant-General Sir Robert O'Callaghan
- 1830–1837: General Patrick Stuart
- 1837–1842: General Lord Greenock
- 1842–1847: Lieutenant-General Sir Neil Douglas
- 1847–1852: General Henry Riddell
- 1852–1854: General Sir Thomas Napier
- 1854–1860: General Viscount Melville
- 1860–1861: Major-General Duncan Cameron
- 1861–1867: Major-General Edward Forestier-Walker

=== Commanding the troops in the North British District ===
- 1868–1873: Major-General Randal Rumley
- 1873–1875: Major-General Sir John Douglas
- 1875–1878: Major-General John Stuart
- 1878–1880: Major-General Robert Bruce
- 1880–1881: Major-General William Hope
- 1881–1885: Major-General Alastair Macdonald
- 1885–1888: Major-General Alexander Elliot
- 1888–1893: Major-General Sir Arthur Lyttelton-Annesley

=== Commanding the troops in the Scottish District ===
- 1893–1894: Major-General Arthur Lyon Fremantle
- 1894–1896: Major-General Sir Hugh Rowlands

=== General Officer Commanding-in-Chief Scottish District ===
- 1896–1901 Lieutenant General Sir Edward Chapman
- 1901–1903 Lieutenant General Sir Archibald Hunter
- 1903–1905 Lieutenant General Sir Charles Tucker

=== General Officer Commanding-in-Chief Scottish Command ===
- 1905 Lieutenant General Sir Charles Tucker
- 1905–1909 Lieutenant General Sir Edward Leach
- 1909–1913 Lieutenant General Sir Bruce Hamilton
- 1913–1914 Lieutenant General Sir James Wolfe Murray
- 1914–1918 Lieutenant General Sir Spencer Ewart
- 1918–1919 Lieutenant General Sir Frederick McCracken
- 1919–1923 Lieutenant General Sir Francis Davies
- 1923–1926 Lieutenant General Sir Walter Braithwaite
- 1926–1930 Lieutenant General Sir William Peyton
- 1930–1933 General Sir Percy Radcliffe
- 1933–1937 General Sir Archibald Cameron
- 1937–1940 General Sir Charles Grant
- 1940–1941 Lieutenant General Sir Harold Carrington
- 1941–1945 Lieutenant General Sir Andrew Thorne
- 1945–1947 Lieutenant General Sir Neil Ritchie
- 1947–1949 Lieutenant General Sir Philip Christison
- 1949–1952 Lieutenant General Sir Gordon MacMillan
- 1952–1955 Lieutenant General Sir Colin Barber
- 1955–1958 Lieutenant General Sir Horatius Murray
- 1958–1961 Lieutenant General Sir George Collingwood
- 1961–1964 Lieutenant General Sir William Turner
- 1964–1966 Lieutenant General Sir George Gordon-Lennox
- 1966–1969 Lieutenant General Sir Derek Lang
- 1969–1972 Lieutenant General Sir Henry Leask

=== General Officer Commanding, Scotland ===
- 1972–1976 Lieutenant General Sir Chandos Blair
- 1976–1979 Lieutenant General Sir David Scott-Barrett
- 1979–1980 Lieutenant General Sir Michael Gow
- 1980–1982 Lieutenant General Sir David Young
- 1982–1985 Lieutenant General Sir Alexander Boswell
- 1985–1988 Lieutenant General Sir Norman Arthur
- 1988–1991 Lieutenant General Sir John MacMillan
- 1991–1993 Lieutenant General Sir Peter Graham
- 1993–1995 Major-General Michael Scott
- 1995–1997 Major-General Jonathan Hall
- 1997–2000 Major-General Mark Strudwick

Note: There was no General Officer Commanding, Scotland between 2000 and 2012

- 2012–2015 Major-General Nick Eeles

=== Military Secretary and General Officer, Scotland ===
- 2015–2017 Major-General Nicholas Ashmore
- 2017–2019 Major-General Bob Bruce
- 2019–2021 Major-General Tim Hyams
- 2021–2023 Major-General William Wright
- 2023–2026 Major-General Robin Lindsay
- 2026–Present Major-General Nicholas Thomas
