= Spynie Hospital =

- NHS Grampian
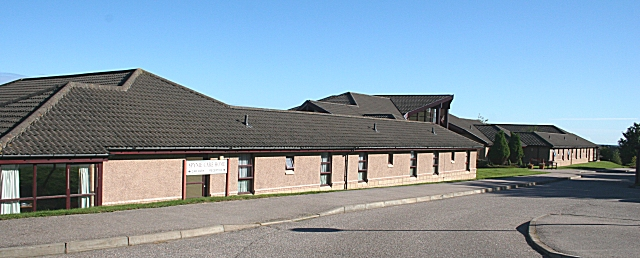
- Spynie Care Home

- Shown in Moray

Geography
- Location: Elgin, Moray, Scotland, United Kingdom
- Coordinates: 57°39′33″N 3°19′45″W

Organisation
- Care system: NHS Scotland
- Type: General

Services
- Emergency department: No Accident & Emergency

History
- Closed: October 2004

Links
- Lists: Hospitals in Scotland

Spynie Hospital was a community hospital in Elgin, Scotland. It was managed by NHS Grampian.

== History ==
The hospital has its origins in a facility designed by Reid and Wittet which opened as Elgin Joint County Infectious Diseases Hospital in 1900. It moved to new premises across the road in 1935 and joined the National Health Service in 1948 as Spynie Hospital. A 30‑bed geriatric care home was added to the facility in 1988. The hospital closed in 2004.

Grampian Primary Care NHS Trust continued to use Spynie Hospital as offices until late 2016.
