= Neil Douglas =

British army general

Lieutenant-General Sir Neil Douglas KCB KCH
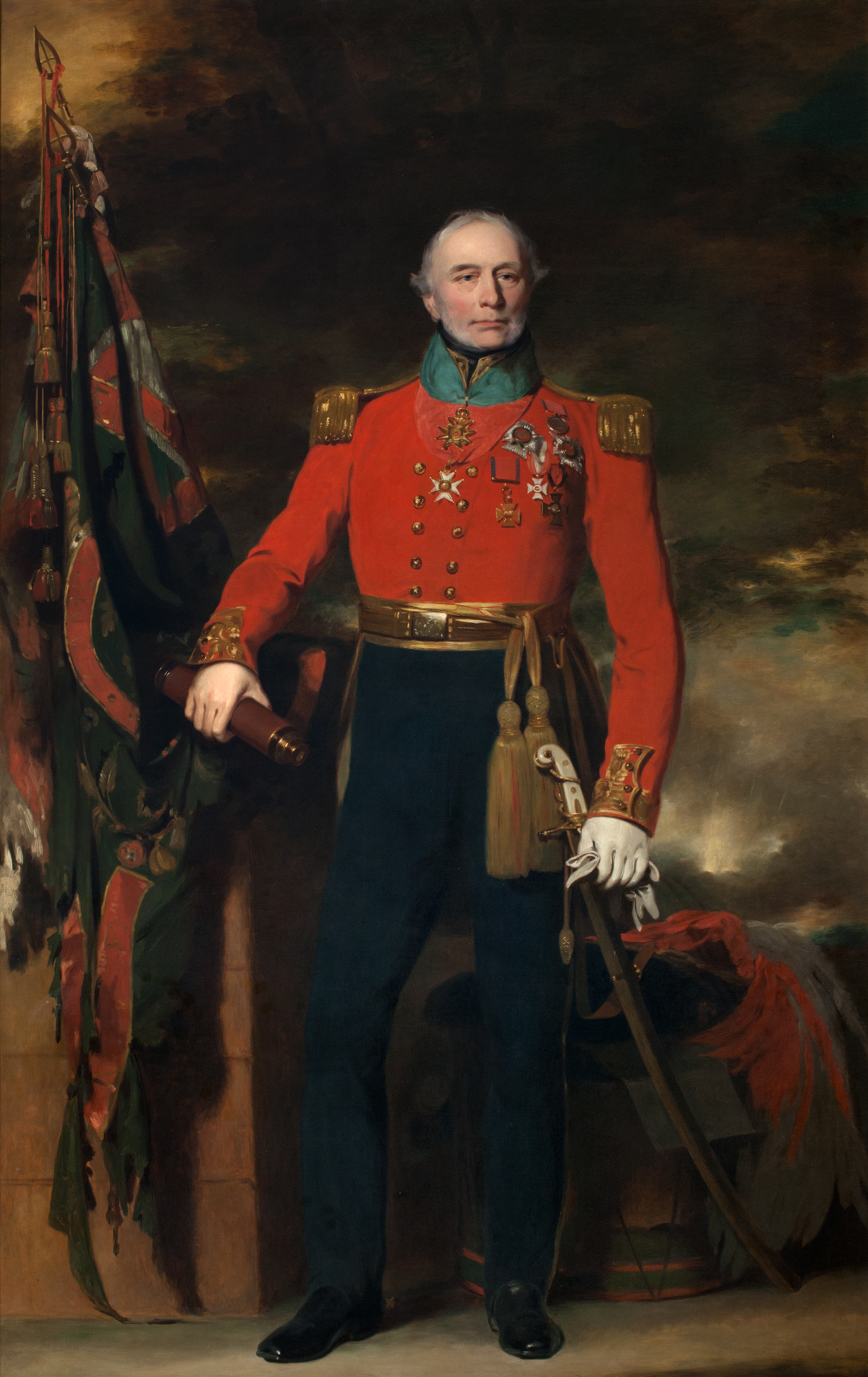
- Born: 1779; Glasgow
- Died: 1 September 1853 (aged 73–74)
- Military career
- Allegiance: United Kingdom
- Branch: British Army
- Rank: Lieutenant-General
- Commands: Commander-in-Chief, Scotland
- Conflicts: Napoleonic Wars
- Awards: Knight Commander of the Order of the Bath; Knight Commander of the Royal Guelphic Order

Lieutenant-General Sir Neil Douglas KCB KCH (1779 – 1 September 1853) was a British Army officer who fought at the 1815 Battle of Waterloo and later became Commander-in-Chief, Scotland.

== Life ==
=== Family ===
He was the son of John Douglas, a Scottish merchant of the planter class of the West Indies, and the brother of plantation owner and art collector Cecilia Douglas, who, by her marriage, became one of the wealthiest women in Scotland.

=== Military career ===
Douglas was commissioned as a Second Lieutenant into the 95th Regiment of Foot on 28 January 1801. Promoted to captain in the 79th Regiment of Foot on 19 April 1804, he took part in the Battle of Copenhagen in August 1807, the Battle of Corunna in January 1809 and Battle of Bussaco in September 1810 during the Napoleonic Wars.

He went on to fight in the Battle of Nivelle in November 1813, the Battle of the Nive in December 1813 and the Battle of Toulouse in April 1814. Promoted to lieutenant-colonel on 3 December 1812, he commanded his regiment at the Battle of Quatre Bras in June 1815 and the Battle of Waterloo also in June 1815 during the Hundred Days.

He served as Commander-in-Chief, Scotland and also as Governor of Edinburgh Castle from 1842 to 1847 at the rank of Major General.

== Family ==
In 1816 he married Barbara Robertson, daughter of George Robertson, a banker in Greenock. They had a son, General Sir John Douglas of Glenfinart GCB (7 July 1817 – 8 September 1888), a British Army officer who became Commander-in-Chief, Scotland.

Military offices
Preceded by Lord Greenock	Commander-in-Chief, Scotland; 1842–1847	Succeeded by Henry Riddell
Preceded by Lord Greenock	Governor of Edinburgh Castle; 1842–1847	Succeeded by Henry Riddell
Preceded by Paul Anderson	Colonel of the 78th (Highlanders) Regiment of Foot; 1851–1853	Succeeded by Sir William Chalmers
Preceded by Sir Colin Campbell	Colonel of the 72nd Regiment, Duke of Albany's Own Highlanders; 1847–1851	Succeeded by John Aitchison
Preceded by Sir George Henry Frederick Berkeley	Colonel of the 81st Regiment of Foot (Loyal Lincoln Volunteers); 1845–1847	Succeeded by Thomas Evans
