= Attorney General Douglas =

Attorney General Douglas may refer to:

- Ian Douglas (politician) (fl. 2000s), Attorney General of Dominica
- Paul L. Douglas (1927–2012), Attorney General of Nebraska
- Robert Dick Douglas (1875–1960), Attorney General of North Carolina
- Samuel Douglas (1781–1833), Attorney General of Pennsylvania
- Wallace B. Douglas (1852–1930), Attorney General of Minnesota
