= John Douglas (British Army officer) =

British Army officer (1817–1888)

General Sir John Douglas GCB
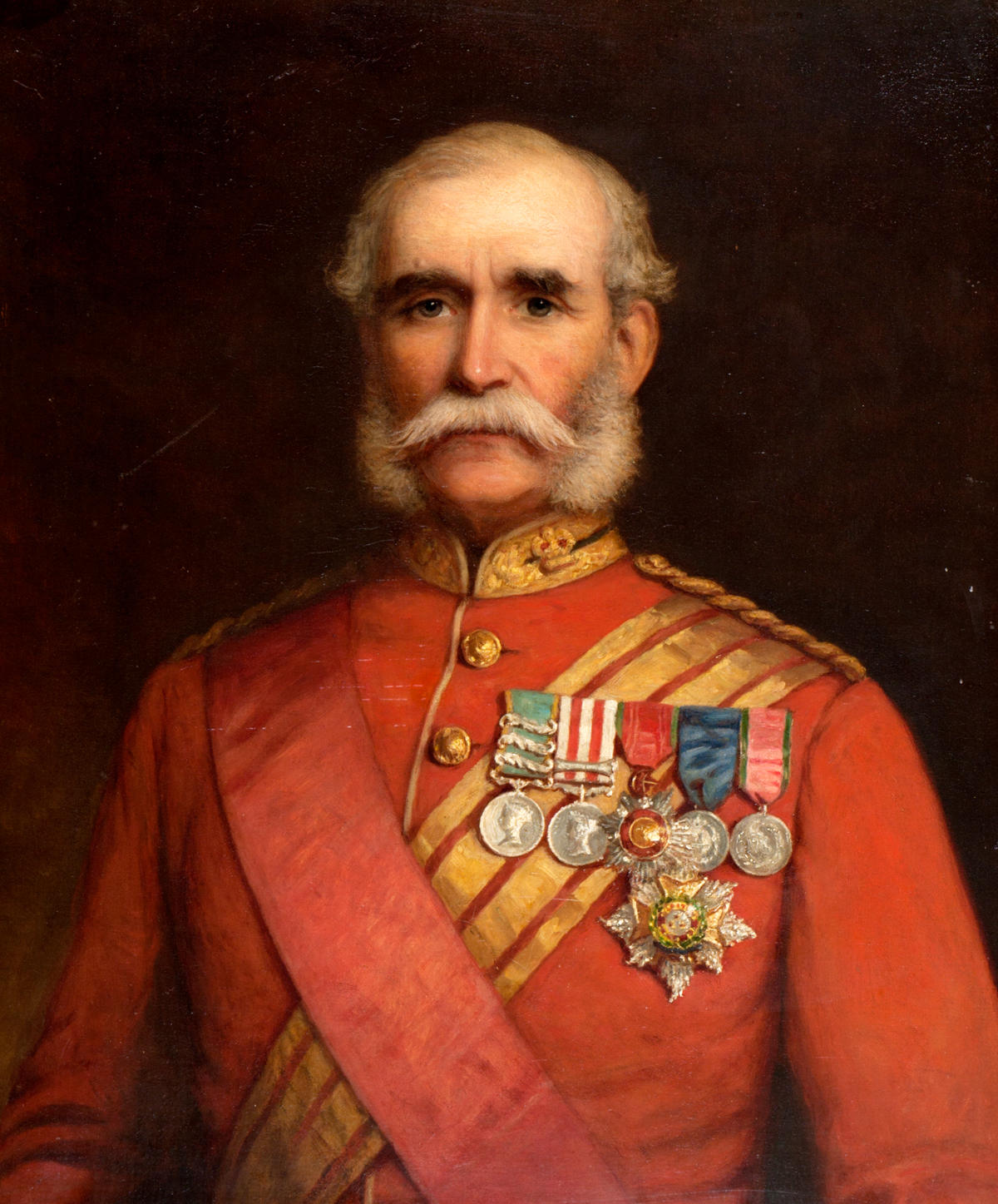
- Born: 7 July 1817
- Died: 8 September 1888 (aged 71); Glenfinart House, Argyllshire
- Military career
- Allegiance: United Kingdom
- Branch: British Army
- Rank: General
- Commands: Commander-in-Chief, Scotland
- Conflicts: Crimean War; Indian Mutiny
- Awards: Knight Grand Cross of the Order of the Bath

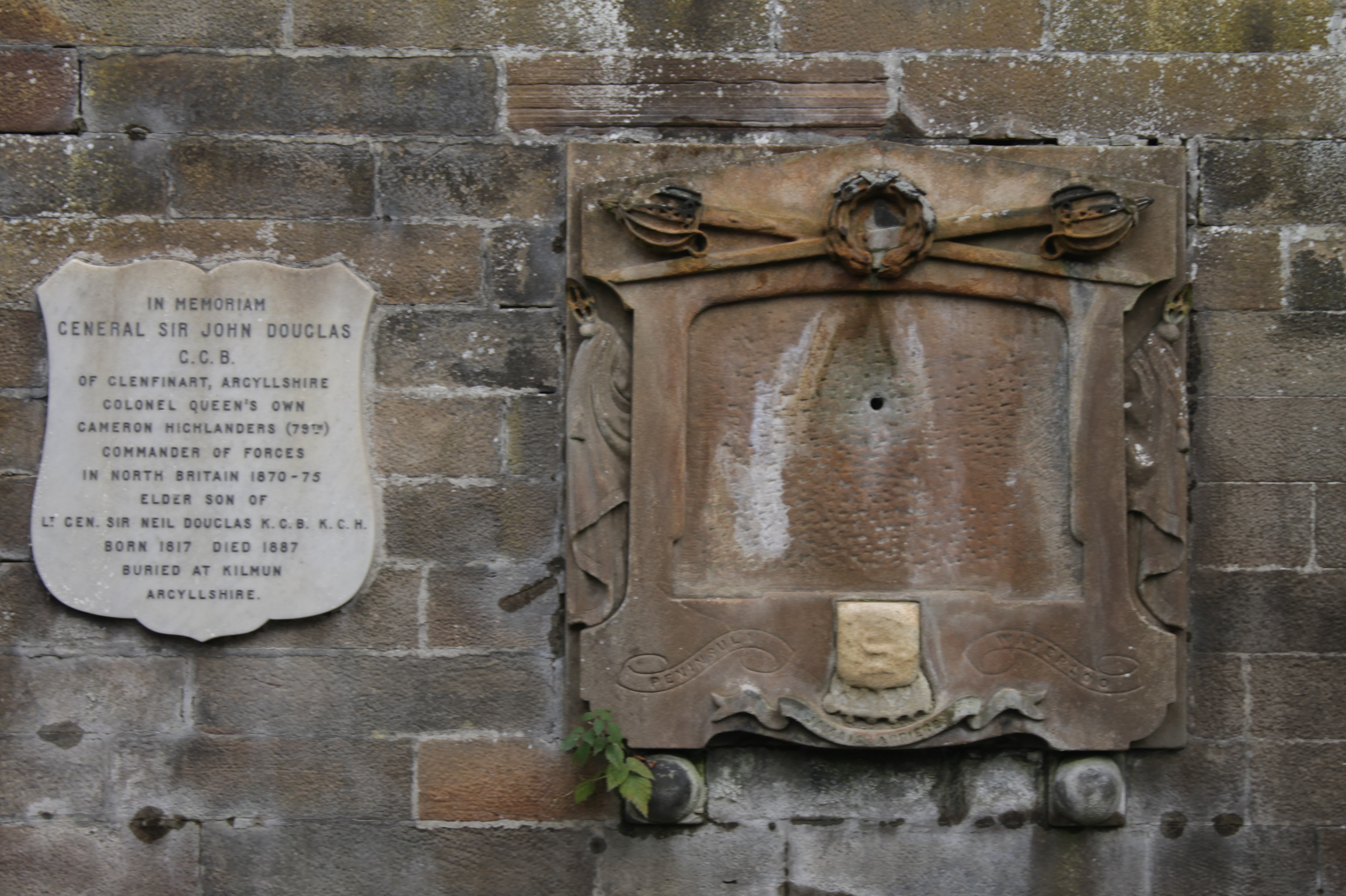
Memorial to General Sir John Douglas, Dalry Cemetery

General Sir John Douglas of Glenfinart GCB (7 July 1817 – 8 September 1888) was a British Army officer who became Commander-in-Chief, Scotland.

== Military career ==
Born the son of Lieutenant General Sir Neil Douglas, Douglas was commissioned in 1833. He commanded the 79th Regiment of Foot at the Battle of Alma in September 1854, at the Battle of Balaclava in October 1854 and at the Siege of Sebastopol in Winter 1854 during the Crimean War. He also took part in the response to the Indian Mutiny.

He went on to command the troops in the North British District from in 1873 before retiring in 1875. He was given the colonelcy of The Queen's Own Cameron Highlanders from 1879 to 1887 and promoted full general on 30 January 1880.

He married Lady Elizabeth Cathcart, eldest daughter of the 2nd Earl of Cathcart. They had two surviving sons, born 13 years apart: Neil Douglas Cecil Frederick Douglas (born 1844) and Charles John Cathcart Douglas (born 1857).

He died in 1888 and was buried in the graveyard of St Munn's Parish Church, Kilmun. A memorial also exists on the central vault in Dalry Cemetery in west Edinburgh. He was the cousin of Sir James Douglas, 1st Governor of British Columbia.

Military offices
Preceded by Randal Rumley	Commanding the troops in the North British District; 1873–1875	Succeeded by John Stuart
Preceded by Sir Alfred Horsford	Colonel of the 79th Regiment of Foot (Cameron Highlanders); 1879–1887	Succeeded by Sir Richard Chambre Hayes Taylor
