= British Army incremental infantry companies =

Military units

The British Army primarily divides its infantry into regiments, which are subdivided into battalions. However, for various reasons, since the end of the Second World War it has also maintained companies that are intended to provide increments and reinforcements.

== Disbanded battalions ==
In the 1960s, a policy began to be implemented intended to move the infantry away from collections of regiments made up of just single battalions, towards what came to be known as "large regiments", made up of a number of battalions, which would be formed by the amalgamation of several existing regiments. Between 1964 and 1968, a total of six of these multi-battalion regiments were formed, before a policy change saw the process halted. As part of this however, there were additional plans to reduce the size of the infantry, through the disbanding or amalgamation of individual battalions. Again however, after the first round of disbandings and amalgamations, the policy was halted, with those battalions intended for removal instead reduced in size to a single company. A total of seven battalions had units reduced in this way:

- 2nd Battalion, Scots Guards - in March 1971, the 2nd Battalion was placed in suspended animation, with 2nd Battalion Company formed to take on its traditions. Additionally, two further companies, F Company and S Company, were also used to reinforce other Foot Guards battalions. The 2nd Battalion was reformed in January 1972.
- 4th Battalion, The Queen's Regiment - the 4th Battalion was disbanded in December 1970, with Albuhera Company retained until it too was disbanded in November 1973.
- 4th Battalion, The Royal Anglian Regiment - the 4th Battalion was disbanded in October 1970, with Tiger Company retained until it was disbanded in July 1975.
- 1st Battalion, The Royal Hampshire Regiment - the 1st Battalion had been planned to be amalgamated with the Gloucestershire Regiment, until that plan was halted, with instead the Royal Hampshire Regiment being reduced to Minden Company in August 1970. The 1st Battalion was eventually reformed in January 1972.
- 1st Battalion, The Argyll and Sutherland Highlanders (Princess Louise's) - the 1st Battalion was one of three single battalion regiments that elected to disband rather than amalgamate. (Note: The other two were 1st Battalion, The Cameronians and 1st Battalion, York and Lancaster Regiment.) While the other two were eventually disbanded in 1968, the Argyll and Sutherland Highlanders were instead reduced to Balaklava Company in January 1971. Twelve months later, in January 1972, the 1st Battalion was reformed.
- 3rd Battalion, The Royal Green Jackets - the 3rd Battalion was disbanded in September 1970, with R Company retained. The battalion was subsequently re-established in January 1972.
- 2nd Battalion, 2nd King Edward VII's Own Gurkha Rifles (The Sirmoor Rifles) - the 2nd Battalion was intended for amalgamation with the 1st Battalion in September 1970, but was instead retained as a separate company, with the battalion re-established in January 1972.

A number of the incremental companies were posted to various locations overseas during their existence. Three were posted on roulement tours to Gibraltar as part of the local British Garrison - Balaklava Company, Argyll and Sutherland Highlanders between May and November 1971; Minden Company, Royal Hampshire Regiment between November 1971 and January 1972; and Tiger Company, Royal Anglian Regiment between December 1971 and May 1972. All three served alongside the 1st Battalion, Royal Regiment of Fusiliers, which was the resident infantry battalion in the territory during that period. Tiger Company was also posted on a roulement tour of Northern Ireland between March and July 1974. Two of the three incremental companies formed following the suspension of 2nd Battalion, Scots Guards also undertook operational taskings, with F Company attached to the 1st Battalion, Irish Guards between October 1970 and January 1972 during that unit's posting as a resident infantry battalion in Hong Kong, while S Company formed the resident infantry unit in British Honduras from January to August 1971 before returning to the UK for attachment to 1st Battalion, Grenadier Guards. A further operational posting came between October 1970 and May 1971 when R Company, Royal Green Jackets was attached to the UNFICYP forces in Cyprus.

Aside from operational taskings, some of the incremental companies were retained for various duties at home. 2nd Battalion Company, Scots Guards was stationed in Edinburgh throughout its existence from March 1971 to January 1972, where it undertook public duties, as well as recruitment and training tasks, which included service as OPFOR during an exercise undertaken in Scotland by 24 Airportable Brigade. Tiger Company, Royal Anglian Regiment also saw two periods as the Demonstration Infantry Company, providing OPFOR duties, at the Royal Military Academy Sandhurst. These were between October 1970 and November 1971 (when it also undertook the same task for the Mons Officer Cadet School), and between July 1974 and July 1975. Interspersed between its various taskings, Tiger Company was reduced to a cadre between September 1972 and November 1973, serving as a training unit at the Junior Soldiers Wing in Canterbury. Albuhera Company, Queen's Regiment was utilised as a recruiting team throughout its existence between January 1971 and November 1973.

By late 1971, the British Army's commitment to Northern Ireland was such that it was having difficulty meeting other obligations, most particularly to NATO. As a consequence, the government elected to raise an additional four infantry battalions in an effort to meet its commitments both to the security situation in Northern Ireland and ensure that the British Army of the Rhine was not impeded. In January 1972, the four battalions were raised from four of the existing incremental companies:

- 1st Battalion, Argyll and Sutherland Highlanders - reformed at Ritchie Camp, Kirknewton
- 1st Battalion, Royal Hampshire Regiment - reformed at Roman Barracks, Colchester
- 3rd Battalion, Royal Green Jackets - reformed at Horseshoe Barracks, Shoeburyness
- 2nd Battalion, Scots Guards - reformed at Redford Barracks, Edinburgh

After their reformation, between July 1972 and November 1974, the four battalions conducted a total of nine operational roulement tours of Northern Ireland, with a company of the Argyll and Sutherland Highlanders also deployed in March 1973 to act as security during the 1973 border referendum alongside a company of the 2nd Battalion, Grenadier Guards.

Additionally, the 2nd Battalion, 2nd Gurkha Rifles (2/2 GR) was reformed in Hong Kong as part of a stabilisation of the size of the Brigade of Gurkhas at five infantry battalions - under the late 1960s defence cuts it had been planned to reduce this down to four battalions. The obligations faced by the infantry in Northern Ireland and Germany led to an alteration of this proposal; three battalions of Gurkhas would remained stationed in Hong Kong and one in Brunei, but for the first time, a Gurkha battalion would be regularly posted to the United Kingdom. The presence of an extra infantry battalion in the UK was aimed to ensure no loss of capability in the event of other units being required for Northern Ireland. 2/2 GR was initially stationed in Hong Kong on its reformation, before moving to Queen Elizabeth Barracks, Church Crookham in 1975.

== Public duties ==
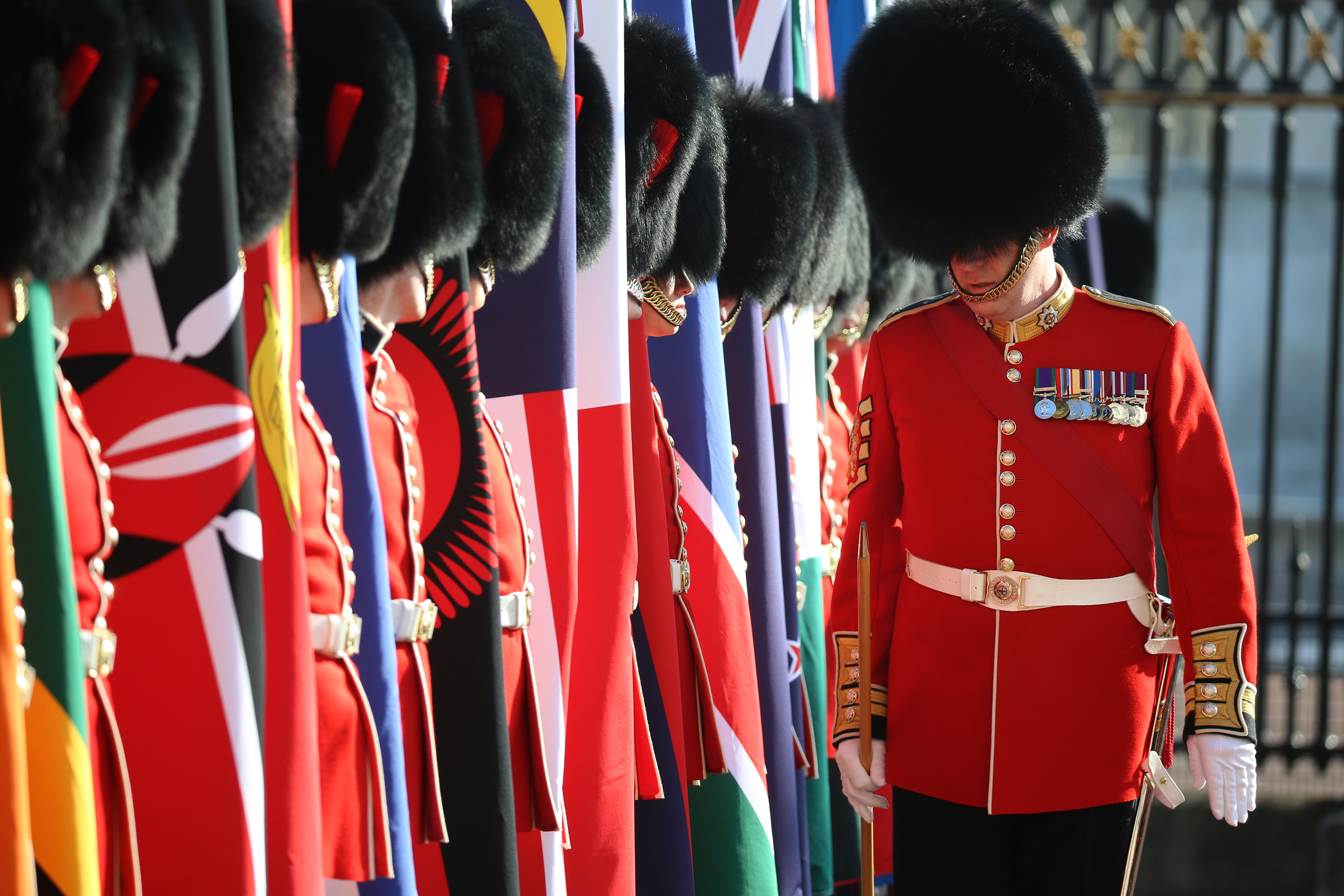
Flag-bearers from No. 7 Company, Coldstream Guards, at the Commonwealth Heads of Government Meeting, 2018.

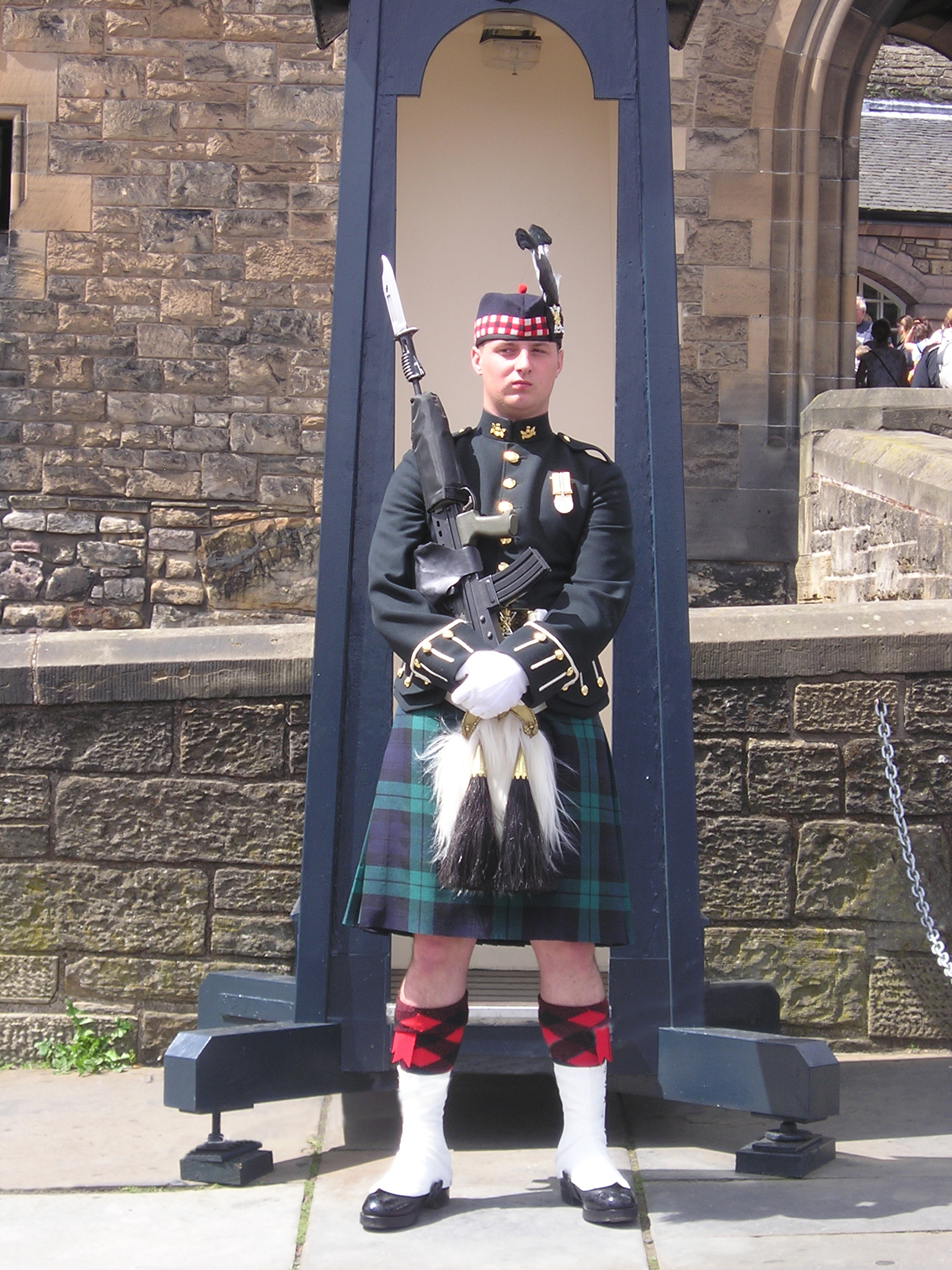
Sentry of the Royal Regiment of Scotland outside Edinburgh Castle.

The British Army maintains incremental companies to serve as permanent public duties units in London and Edinburgh.

=== Foot Guards ===
The Guards Division of the British Army contains a total of five battalions, one from each of the five regiments of Foot Guards. However, before the Options for Change defence review in 1992, there were eight battalions:

- 1st and 2nd Battalions, Grenadier Guards
- 1st and 2nd Battalions, Coldstream Guards
- 1st and 2nd Battalions, Scots Guards
- 1st Battalion, Irish Guards
- 1st Battalion, Welsh Guards

The cuts made to the infantry under Options for Change included three battalions of Guards. However, rather than disbanding them, the 2nd Battalions of each of the first three regiments were placed in "suspended animation" - although they would not be active, they would still be listed on the Army Roll, and could be reactivated should they be needed. In order to maintain the traditions of each battalion, and to keep custody of the colours, three companies were kept active, one to represent each battalion:

- No 2 Company, 2nd Battalion Grenadier Guards (renamed Nijmegen Company for the battle honour won by the 2nd (Armoured) Battalion in 1944)
- No 7 Company, 2nd Battalion Coldstream Guards
- F Company, 2nd Battalion Scots Guards

These three units were based permanently at Chelsea Barracks in London on public duties until Chelsea Barracks was sold off by the army. They represent the suspended battalions at significant events, such as Trooping the Colour, and receive the battalion's new colours whenever they are presented. As such, each company is an independent unit of their regiment, separate from the operational battalions. In 2010, with the closure of Chelsea Barracks, the three companies were moved and are now permanently based at Wellington Barracks. A large majority of new guardsmen completing the Combat Infantry Course at the Infantry Training Centre and going to either the Grenadier, Coldstream or Scots Guards will be sent first to the incremental company for between six and nine months, where they will be able to receive further training before they are then posted to the regiment's operational battalion.

Although neither the Grenadier or Coldstream Guards had previously had incremental companies formed from their 2nd battalions, between March 1971 and January 1972 the 2nd Battalion, Scots Guards was reduced to a single company as a result of defence cuts. Additionally, F Company was also retained to serve as a reinforcement unit attached to the Irish Guards. Options for Change also saw the retention of a second company from the Grenadier Guards, when The Inkerman Company was transferred from the 2nd Battalion to the 1st Battalion to serve as the left flank company. The Inkerman Company was originally formed in 1961 as a composite company to maintain the traditions of the 3rd Battalion, which was placed in suspended animation, while serving as the left flank company of the 2nd Battalion.

Following the Integrated Review, the foot guards battalion assigned to 11th Security Force Assistance Brigade, which is reduced in size for the duration of its time assigned to the specialised infantry role transfers its remaining strength to the public duties role through the creation of two additional incremental companies. The first battalion to be subject to this process is the 1st Battalion, Irish Guards, between 2023 and 2027. The two companies of Irish Guards, Number 9 Company and Number 12 Company, will also take on the history and traditions of the regiment's 2nd Battalion, which was placed in suspended animation in 1947. The two new public duties companies will join the three existing units in forming five Public Duties Teams within London District.

=== Line Infantry ===
As part of the Army 2020 reforms outlined by the Strategic Defence and Security Review, an additional public duties incremental company was formed in 2013 through the reduction of the 5th Battalion, Royal Regiment of Scotland (formerly the Argyll and Sutherland Highlanders) to company strength to serve as a public duties unit in Scotland. This unit, Balaklava Company (named for the battle honour won by the Argyll and Sutherland Highlanders in 1854), is based at Redford Barracks, Edinburgh. This was the second time that this battalion had been reduced to a company, following its predecessor's reduction from 1st Battalion, Argyll and Sutherland Highlanders to Balaklava Company between January 1971 and January 1972.

== Gurkha reinforcement companies ==
=== Regular infantry ===
In the 1990s, it became apparent that some regular infantry battalions were suffering manpower issues, while at the same time the Brigade of Gurkhas was over-manned. Therefore, a decision was taken to use the excess manpower from the Gurkhas to augment under strength infantry battalions through the establishment of reinforcement companies that would wear the cap badge of the Royal Gurkha Rifles, but be attached to other regiments. A total of five infantry battalions received Gurkha companies between 1994 and 2004:

- 2nd Battalion, The Parachute Regiment - C Company (1994-2001)
- 1st Battalion, The Royal Scots (The Royal Regiment) - B Company (1996-2001) (Note: The company attached to the Royal Scots transferred to the Highlanders in 2001)
- 1st Battalion, The Princess of Wales's Royal Regiment (Queen's and Royal Hampshires) - Gurkha Company (1996-1999)
- 1st Battalion, The Royal Irish Regiment (27th (Inniskilling), 83rd, 87th and Ulster Defence Regiment) - D (Gurkha) Company (1998-2003)
- 1st Battalion, The Highlanders (Seaforth, Gordons and Camerons) - A (Gallipoli) Company (2001-2004)

The Gurkha companies operated as fully integrated elements of their parent units, and saw deployments alongside both the Parachute Regiment and the Royal Irish Regiment to Sierra Leone as part of Operation Palliser in 2000, as well as deployments to Bosnia in 1999 with the Parachute Regiment and to Iraq with the Royal Irish as part of Operation Telic in 2003. The only time that the Gurkhas were not deployed with their parent battalion was in the event of a tour of Northern Ireland as part of Operation Banner - British government policy prevented them from serving in Northern Ireland. So, in the event of the parent battalion undertaking a tour of Northern Ireland, the Gurkha company would need to be detached for duty elsewhere. This occurred when the Royal Scots were deployed on two roulement tours, with B Company instead deployed to Bosnia as part of Operation Resolute. Both the Parachute Regiment and the Princess of Wales's Royal Regiment also deployed to Northern Ireland during the periods they were reinforced by Gurkha companies.

Although the last of the reinforcement companies, attached to 1st Battalion, The Highlanders, was disbanded in 2004, a new batch of units was formed from 2008, again as a result of manpower shortages in the infantry. This eventually saw three new reinforcement companies formed - one of these was attached to 2nd Battalion, The Royal Gurkha Rifles, while the other two formed part of other regiments:

- 1st Battalion, The Mercian Regiment - G (Tobruk) Company (2009-2012)
- 1st Battalion, The Yorkshire Regiment (14th/15th, 19th and 33rd/76th Foot) - D (Delhi) Company (2009-2012)

As with previous reinforcement units, the new companies were fully integrated elements of their parent battalions, deploying on a number of occasions as part of Operation Herrick to Afghanistan.

=== Special operations infantry ===
In 2019, the government announced the formation of a new third battalion of the Royal Gurkha Rifles, intended for use as part of the Specialised Infantry Group, a formation intended to operate in the training and mentoring role with the armed forces of other nations. On 31 January 2020, the new battalion was officially formed with the formation of its first sub-unit, A (Coriano) Company, which was initially attached to 4th Battalion, The Rifles, pending the formation of the remainder of the battalion. (Note: Coriano Company was subsequently renamed as G (Coriano) Company in 2022.) However, in 2021 a new defence review reversed the decision to form a new battalion, with instead a number of individual companies to be formed intended to support and reinforce the army where needed. A second new company, F (Falklands) Company, was formed on 18 November 2021, attached to 2nd Battalion, The Princess of Wales's Royal Regiment. A third special operations company, A (Krithia) Company, was formed in September 2024, becoming the first Gurkha unit to be stationed in Northern Ireland. Each of the new companies were subsequently attached to a battalion of the Rangers, the newly formed special operations regiment.

== Airborne forces ==
In 1946, the UK's airborne forces were reorganised, with a number of new units formed that were affiliated to other regiments of the infantry. The newly constituted 1st (Guards) Parachute Battalion was formed using men exclusively drawn from the Household Division. However, after just two years, the battalion was itself reduced in size to a single company, which assumed the title No. 1 (Guards) Independent Parachute Company. Retaining its ethos as a unit manned exclusively by soldiers from the Household Cavalry and Brigade of Guards, the company was quickly tasked as 16 Parachute Brigade's pathfinder unit, as well as being used as a reinforcement rifle company within 16 Brigade. In the 1960s, it also took on an armoured reconnaissance role equipped with the Ferret armoured car. The company was used extensively in a number of operational theatres, including the Suez Canal, Cyprus and West Germany, as well as being deployed to Northern Ireland during the first half of the 1970s, usually attached to a battalion of the Parachute Regiment. The company was eventually disbanded in 1975. Both the role and the history of No. 1 (Guards) Independent Parachute Company were perpetuated by the formation of separate platoons; in 1985, a new Pathfinder Platoon was established as part of the Parachute Regiment within 5 Airborne Brigade, while in the late 1990s a platoon within B Company of 3rd Battalion, Parachute Regiment was designated as 6 (Guards) Platoon, manned exclusively by men recruited from the Guards Division and Household Cavalry.
