= Priory Road drill hall, Hornsey =

Military installation at Hornsey in London

Priory Road drill hall
- Hornsey
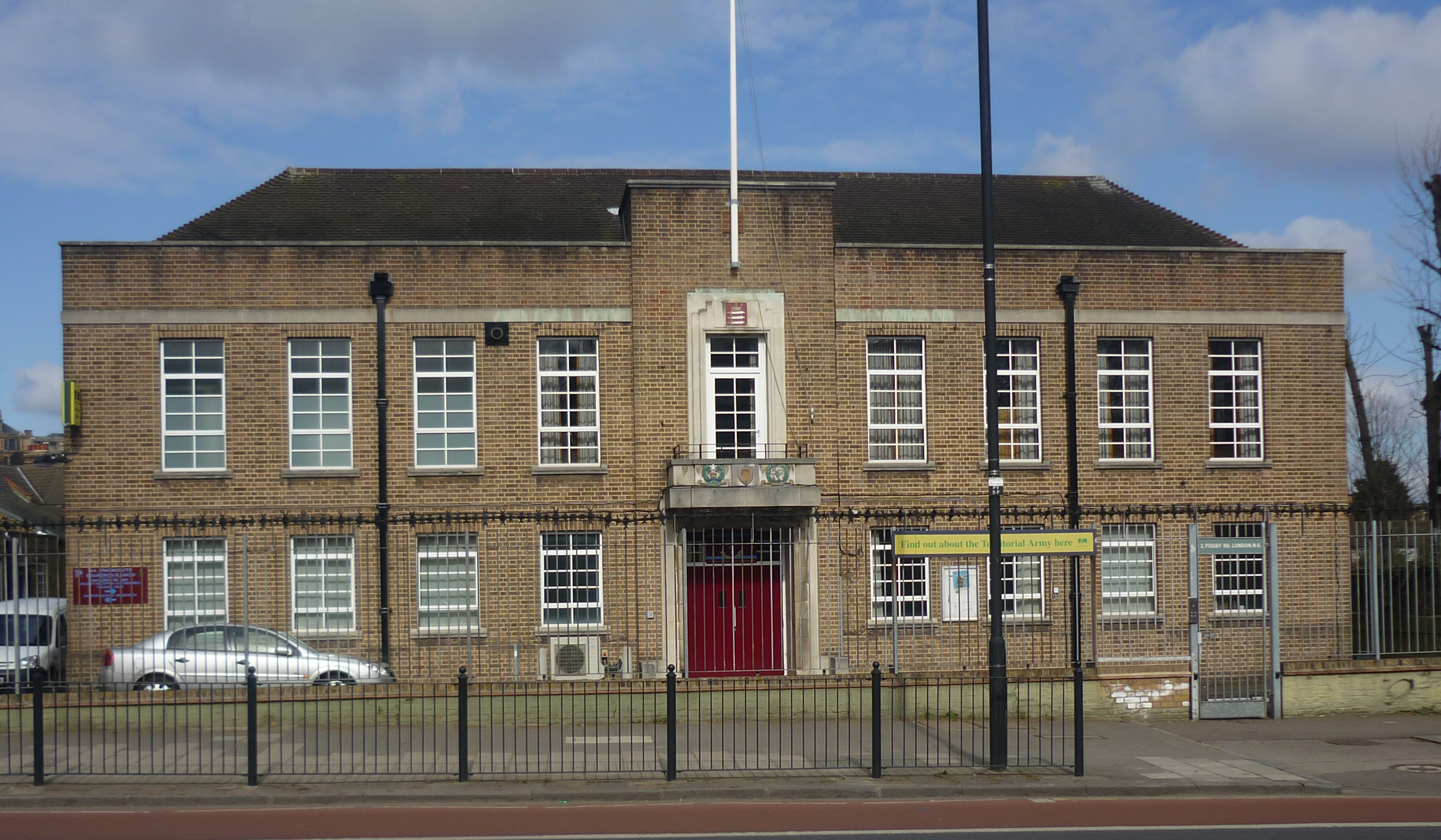
- Priory Road drill hall

Site information
- Type: Drill hall

Location
- Location within Greater London
- Coordinates: 51.58731°N 0.12298°W

Site history
- Built: 1903
- Built for: War Office
- In use: 1903-Present

The Priory Road drill hall is a military installation at Hornsey in London.

== History ==
Before 1888, the Territorial Force in Hornsey used a small drill-hall at Crouch End. From 1888 they moved to the National hall on Hornsey High Street. This building was in use until in 1896 when The Elms, an old house on the site of the current drill hall was bought as headquarters for the 3rd Middlesex Rifle Volunteers. By 1903, the old house had been extended to form the first a drill-hall. In 1908, the Hornsey unit became the 7th Battalion, The Middlesex Regiment. The battalion was mobilised at the drill hall in August 1914 before being deployed to the Western Front. The drill hall was completely rebuilt in 1936.

Following the cut-backs in 1967, the presence at the drill hall was reduced to one company, B Company 6th / 7th (Volunteer) Battalion, the Queen's Regiment, in 1975 and B (Albuhera) Company, 8th Battalion The Queen's Fusiliers in 1988. After the London Regiment (1993) was formed in 1992, the presence at the drill hall was further reduced to a single rifle platoon from B (Queen's Regiment) Company, the London Regiment: the building remains an active Army Reserve Centre.
