= Kirknewton =

Kirknewton may refer to:

== Places ==
England

- Kirknewton, Northumberland

Scotland

- Kirknewton, West Lothian
- RAF Kirknewton, a Royal Air Force station in West Lothian
