= Brigade of Guards =

Administrative formation of the British Army

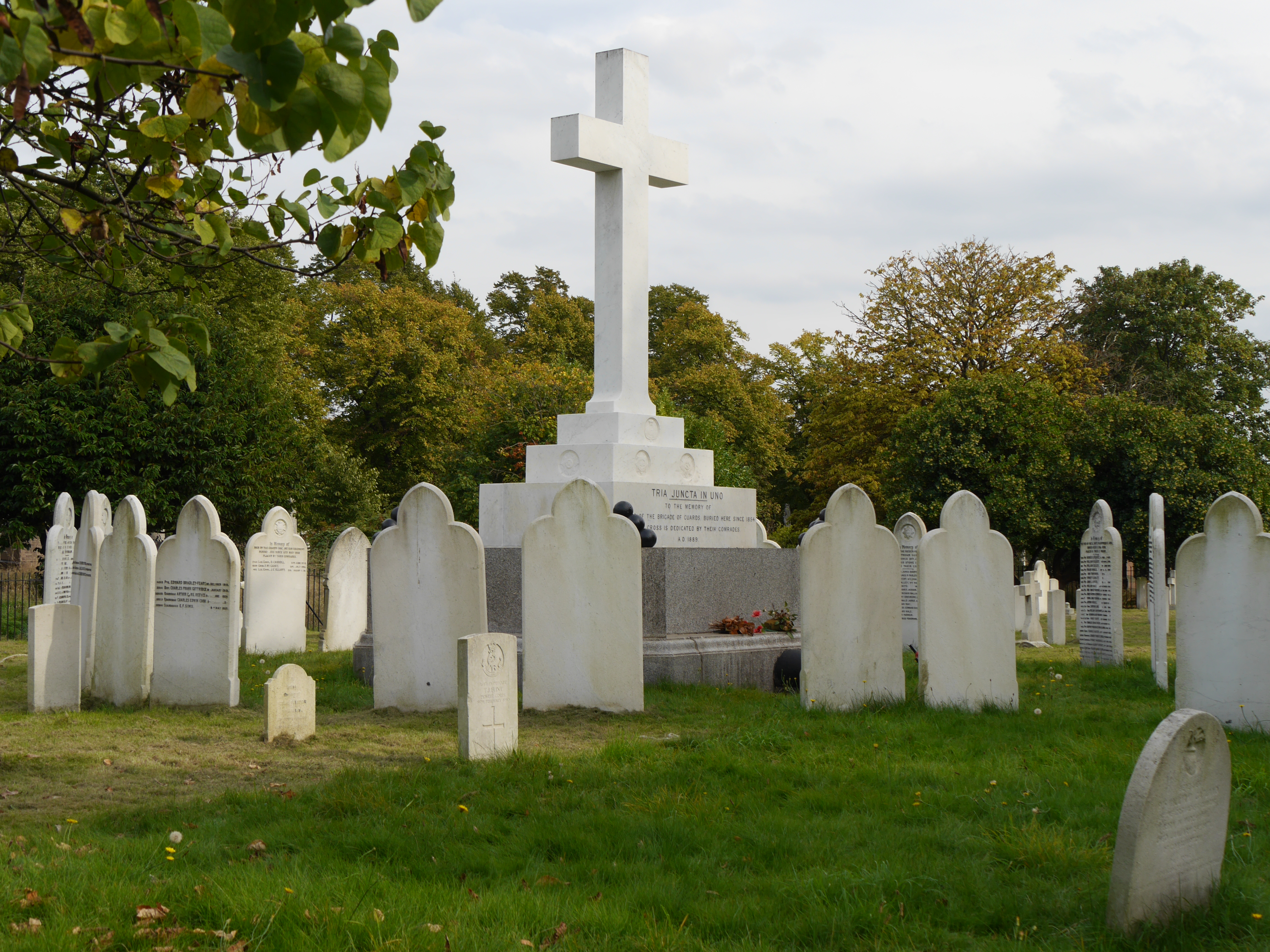
Memorial (erected 1889) and burial site at Brompton Cemetery

The Brigade of Guards was an administrative formation of the British Army from 1856 to 1968. It was commanded by the Major-General commanding the Brigade of Guards and was responsible for administering the guards regiments.

After the Second World War the British Army had fourteen infantry depots, each bearing a letter. Infantry Depot A at Wellington Barracks was the headquarters for the five guards regiments.

In line with the reforms of the army, it was renamed as the Guards Division on 1 July 1968.

== Units ==
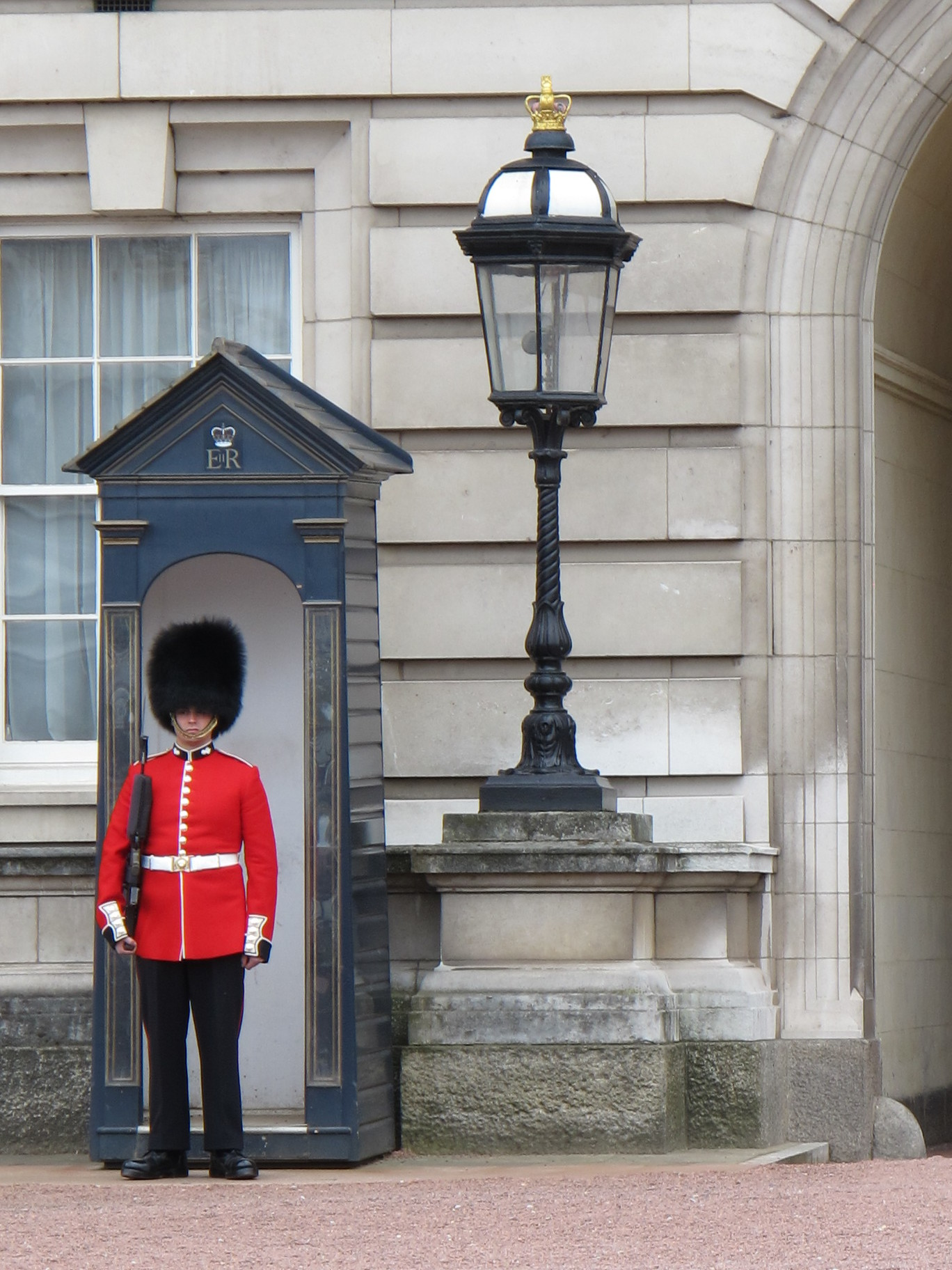
A sentry from the Grenadier Guards on duty outside Buckingham Palace

- 1st Battalion, Grenadier Guards (1656–)
- 2nd Battalion, Grenadier Guards (1656–1994)
- 3rd Battalion, Grenadier Guards (1760–1961)
- 1st Battalion, Coldstream Guards (1650–)
- 2nd Battalion, Coldstream Guards (1711–1994)
- 3rd Battalion, Coldstream Guards (1897–1959)
- 1st Battalion, Scots Guards (1660–)
- 2nd Battalion, Scots Guards (1689–1994)
- 1st Battalion, Irish Guards (1900–)
- 2nd Battalion, Irish Guards (1915–1947) suspended (2022-)
- 3rd Battalion, Irish Guards (1941–1947)
- 1st Battalion, Welsh Guards (1915–)
- Guards Machine Gun Regiment (1917–1920)
- 1st (Guards) Parachute Battalion (1946–1948)
- Guards Independent Parachute Company (1948–1968)

== Formation of the Brigade in Military Campaigns the Brigade in campaigns ==
Formation of the Guards' Brigade during the Second Boer War
Overall Commander: Major General Henry E. Colevile
Unit:	Unit Commander:
1st Battalion, Coldstream Guards	Lt. Col Alfred E. Codrington
2nd Battalion, Coldstream Guards	Lt. Col Arthur Henniker-Major
3rd Battalion, Grenadier Guards	Lt. Col Eyre Crabbe
1st Battalion, Irish Guards	Col Vesey John Dawson CVO
1st Battalion, Scots Guards	Col. Arthur Paget

== Commanders ==
- Major-General Sir Henry Colvile (9 October 1899 – 10 February 1900)
- Colonel Reginald Pole-Carew (10 February 1900 – 10 April 1900)
- Colonel Inigo Jones (10 April 1900 – )
