= Melchior Guy Dickens =

British diplomat (1696–1775)

Lieutenant-Colonel Melchior Guy Dickens (bapt. 18 February 1696 – 1775) was a British diplomat, minister to Prussia and Sweden and ambassador to Russia.

From 1724 to 1730 he was Secretary at the British embassy to Prussia at Berlin; officially appointed Secretary to the Prussian Court in 1730, he seems to have acted as chargé d'affaires there until 1740. In August 1732 he was briefly at Hanover. In 1740 he was promoted to be minister. He left Prussia in May 1741. In June 1742 he arrived in Stockholm as Minister to the Swedish Court. In 1749 he became ambassador to Russia.

Guy Dickens was the father of Gustavus Guydickens, who also joined the British Army, becoming a major-general before resigning in the midst of a homosexuality scandal in 1793.
