= Gustavus Guydickens =

British Army officer and courtier

Major-General Gustavus Guydickens
- Born: 1732; County Westmeath, Ireland
- Died: March 1802 (aged 69–70); Fleet Prison, England
- Burial place: St Bride's Church
- Education: Westminster School; Christ Church, Oxford
- Relatives: Melchior Guy Dickens (father); Mary Ann Costello (niece)
- Military career
- Allegiance: Great Britain
- Branch: British Army
- Service years: 1754–1793
- Rank: Major-General
- Nickname: Gusty
- Unit: 3rd Foot Guards
- Conflicts: Seven Years' War; American Revolutionary War

Major-General Gustavus Guydickens (1732 – March 1802) was a British Army officer and courtier who resigned his positions amidst accusations of homosexuality in 1793. An officer in the 3rd Foot Guards, Guydickens served in the Seven Years' War as aide de camp to Duke Ferdinand of Brunswick-Wolfenbüttel. He also became a Gentleman Usher to the British royal household, rising to become Gentleman Usher of the Privy Chamber. Having briefly served in North America during the American Revolutionary War, Guydickens was promoted to major-general in 1790 and assumed command of his regiment in the following year.

Guydickens was caught having sexual intercourse with a lawyers' clerk in Hyde Park, London, on 16 August 1792. After briefly arresting the two soldiers who had detained him, he was indicted for gross indecency and suspended from the army. He failed in attempts to both bribe his accusers and undermine them with counter-accusations. His trial, repeatedly delayed, never began, and Guydickens retired from the army in 1793. Heavily in debt, he was imprisoned in Fleet Prison in the same year and died there in 1802.

== Early life ==
Gustavus Guydickens was born in County Westmeath, Ireland, in 1732. He was the second son of Lieutenant-Colonel Melchior Guy Dickens, a diplomat who served as ambassador to Russia, and Hannah née Handcock. Guydickens was named after Gustavus Adolphus of Sweden, as his father was on a diplomatic mission there at the time of his birth. His niece, the actress Mary Ann Costello, lived with the family and was brought up by his father. His elder brother, Frederick William Guydickens, became a clergyman.

As children Guydickens and his brother spent time living with Johan Ihre in Sweden, learning eloquence and politics. Known to his family as "Gusty", Guydickens was educated at Westminster School before moving on to Christ Church, Oxford, from which he matriculated on 16 February 1749.

== Military career ==
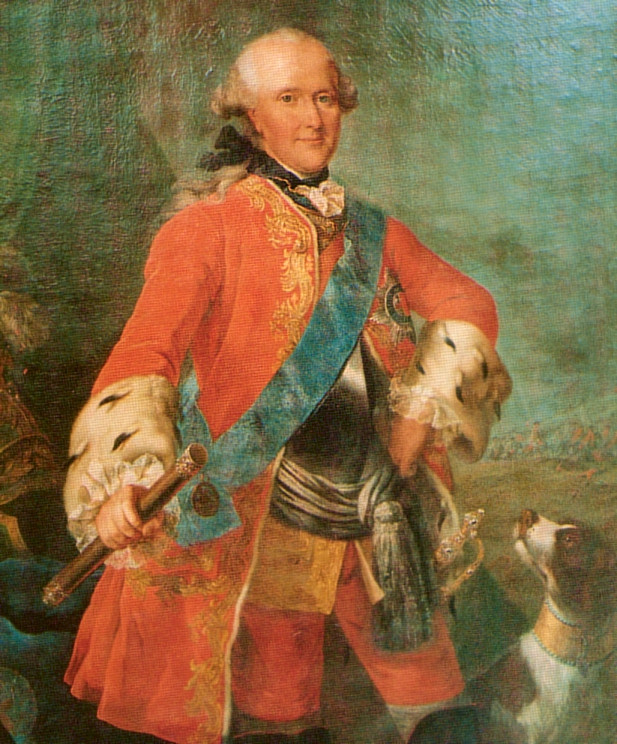
Duke Ferdinand of Brunswick-Wolfenbüttel, who Guydickens served as aide de camp to during the Seven Years' War

Guydickens joined the British Army in 1754, becoming a cornet in the 6th (Inniskilling) Dragoons on 17 December. He was promoted to lieutenant on 2 September 1756. With the Seven Years' War ongoing, from 1760 Guydickens was detached from regimental duties on diplomatic service in Germany. Guydickens transferred to the 3rd Foot Guards as a lieutenant and captain (Note: In this period officers of the Foot Guards held two ranks. Buying a commission in these regiments cost more than it would have in other regiments, and so if an officer in the Foot Guards transferred in his rank to a different regiment he would lose money. To counter this Foot Guards officers held both a regimental rank and an army rank; if they transferred to a regiment outside of the Foot Guards then they would hold their higher, army, rank and would therefore not lose money.) while in Germany on 1 May 1761, serving as aide de camp to Duke Ferdinand of Brunswick-Wolfenbüttel. On 11 November 1762 he arrived at St James's Palace in Britain, carrying news from Ferdinand to George III of the victory at the siege of Cassel on 1 November. He also embarked on a career as a courtier, being appointed a Gentleman Usher Daily Waiter to the royal household of George III in 1765, and continued with his Germany secondment until 1768.

Guydickens was promoted to captain and lieutenant-colonel on 22 February 1775, taking command of a company. Having continued as a courtier, by 1777 he had been appointed Gentleman Usher to Charlotte of Mecklenburg-Strelitz. With the American Revolutionary War underway, Guydickens served in North America from April 1779 until he returned to England on leave in November 1780. He was then promoted to brevet colonel on 16 May 1782, and advanced to serve as a Gentleman Usher of the Privy Chamber on 13 March 1783. In May the same year Guydickens served on the court martial of Lieutenant-Colonel James Cockburn, who had been in command of Sint Eustatius when the island was captured by the French on 26 November 1781. The court found him guilty of culpable neglect and cashiered him.

Guydickens became second major in his regiment on 29 October the following year. He advanced to first major within his regiment on 18 April 1786. By seniority he then became a major-general on 28 April 1790. Still serving to this point as first major of the 3rd Foot Guards, he was appointed a lieutenant-colonel on 15 September 1791. Throughout this period Guydickens was heavily in debt, having to answer fifty-eight actions at the Court of King's Bench between 1787 and 1792.

=== Gross indecency charge ===
While in Hyde Park in the evening of 16 August 1792 Guydickens was caught by Thomas Cannon and William Haywood, two Coldstream Guards privates, undertaking homosexual acts with John Scott, an 18-year-old lawyers' clerk. Cannon was known to search for men in parks who he could blackmail for sodomy; he had recently forced a man to flee the country to avoid Cannon's accusation that he had solicited him for sex. Arrested for gross indecency, Scott and Guydickens were taken by the soldiers to their guardhouse.

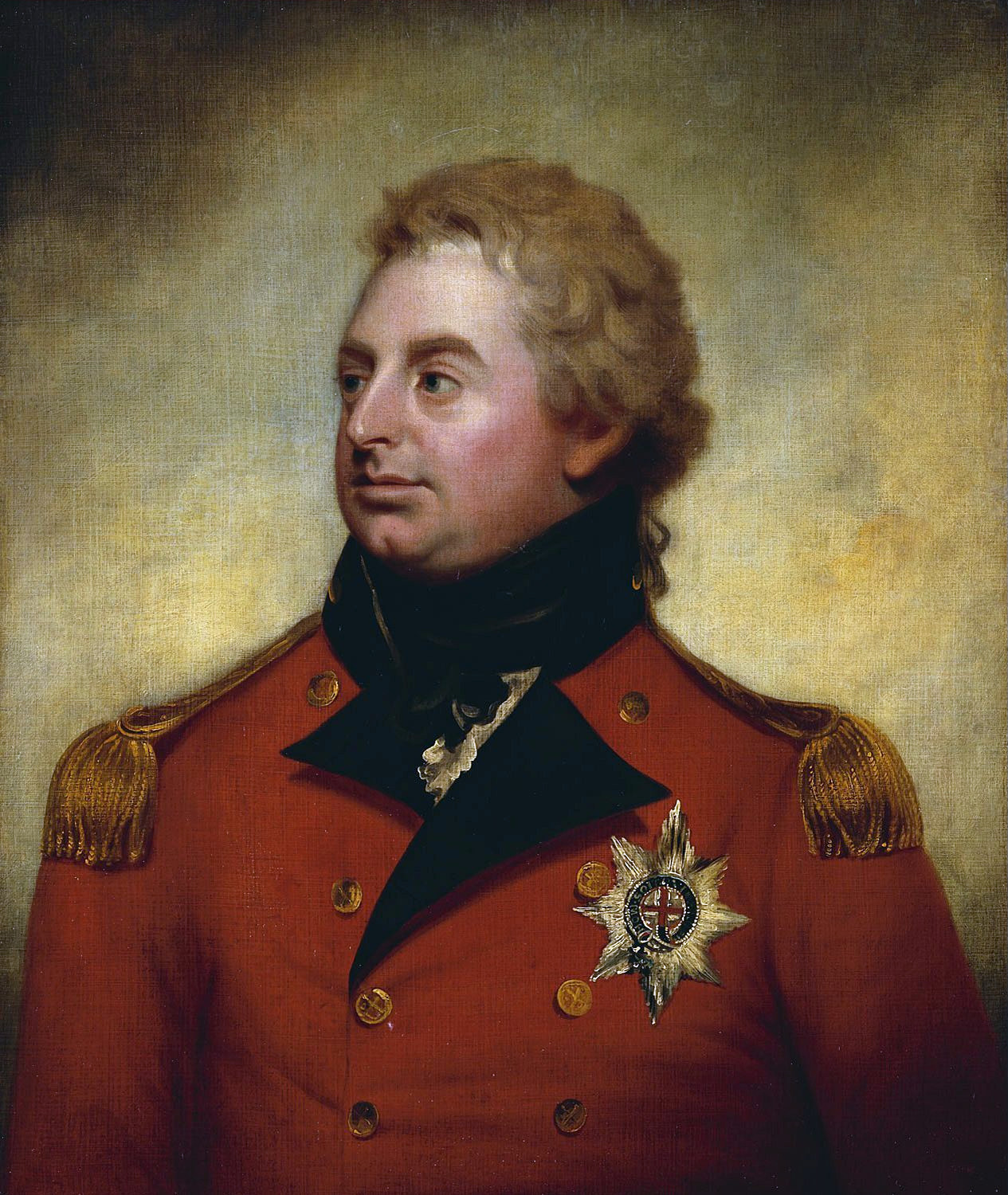
Prince Frederick, Duke of York, held a court of enquiry on Guydickens' conduct and rebuffed his counter-allegations

At the guardhouse Guydickens used his authority to have Cannon and Haywood arrested in turn for "grossly insulting" him, and escaped. He had them released from custody a day later, but the soldiers reported him and Prince Frederick, Duke of York opened a court of enquiry against him. Suspended from his command, Guydickens refused to appear at the court but handed himself in on 20 August, being indicted for an "unnatural crime". He paid his bail and was released, while Scott could not afford it and was left in prison. Guydickens continued his campaign against the two soldiers who had first apprehended him, charging them on 16 September with assault. The Duke of York intervened and paid their bail for them, and the charges were removed on 19 October.

Guydickens' trial at the Court of King's Bench was repeatedly postponed, with many of the military witnesses having left to serve in the Flanders campaign, the French Revolutionary Wars having begun. In April 1793 Cannon was accused of attempting to seduce a 72-year-old porter, but this was abandoned when the court deemed it an attempt to smear his character for Guydickens, who had also made a failed attempt to bribe Cannon. On 24 June Scott was released on bail, having admitted that he had committed "indecencies" with Guydickens. Scott and Guydickens were never brought to trial. The general sold his commission and retired from the army on 31 July. He relinquished his position in the royal household in the same year.

Colonel William Grinfield replaced Guydickens in command of the 3rd Foot Guards and led the regiment on service in the Flanders campaign. Guydickens continued to struggle with debt and in November was committed to Fleet Prison. He was incarcerated for the rest of his life, dying there in March 1802, age 70. He was buried at St Bride's Church on 20 March. Cannon continued his campaign against homosexuals in London parks until November 1808 when he was arrested for extortion. He was found to have actively solicited homosexual men, bringing them back to his home where he sometimes had sex with them before beginning blackmail, and two years later was transported to Australia.
