= St John's Hill Drill Hall =

- Lavender Hill, London
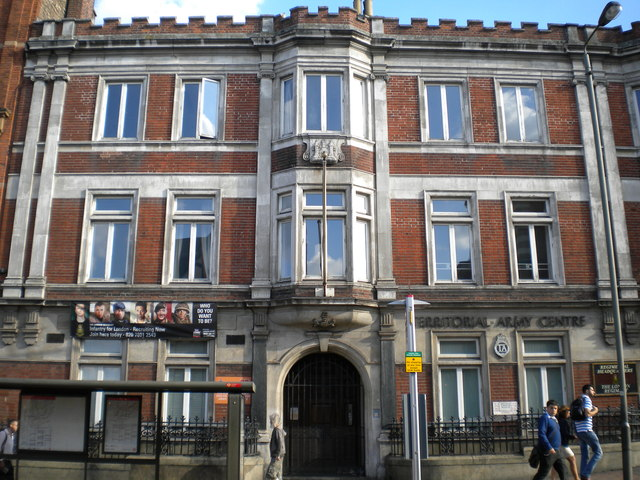
- St John's Hill Drill Hall

Site information
- Type: Drill hall

Location
- Location within London
- Coordinates: 51.46305°N 0.16975°W

Site history
- Built: 1882
- Built for: War Office
- In use: 1882-Present

St John's Hill Drill Hall is a military installation at Lavender Hill in London. The building on St John's Hill became the regimental headquarters for the London Regiment in 1993.

== History ==
The volunteer battalion of the East Surrey Regiment acquired a leasehold interest over a property known as Gothic Villa on St John's Hill in 1882. This volunteer battalion evolved to become the 4th Volunteer Battalion, East Surrey Regiment in 1887. Lord Wandsworth funded the acquisition of a freehold interest in the site in 1897. A drill hall, designed by B. T. L. Thomson, was added at the back of the property around that time and a three storey castellated building, designed by H. Wakeford & Sons, was added at the front of the property in 1902.

The battalion evolved further to become the 23rd (County of London) Battalion, London Regiment in 1908 and was mobilised at the drill hall in August 1914 before being deployed to the Western Front. When the London Regiment was broken up in 1937, the unit converted to become the 42nd Royal Tank Regiment with its base at the drill hall. After the war that unit evolved to become the 23rd London Regiment, the East Surrey Regiment in 1956 and then the 4th Battalion the Queen's Royal Surrey Regiment in 1961. The drill hall went on to become battalion headquarters for the 8th (Volunteer) Battalion, the Queen's Fusiliers (City of London) in 1988 and regimental headquarters for the London Regiment in 1993.
