= John Aitchison (British Army officer) =

British Army officer

General Sir John Aitchison GCB
- Born: 25 April 1779; Tranent
- Died: 12 May 1875 (aged 96); London
- Military career
- Allegiance: United Kingdom
- Branch: British Army
- Rank: General
- Conflicts: Peninsular War
- Awards: Knight Grand Cross of the Order of the Bath

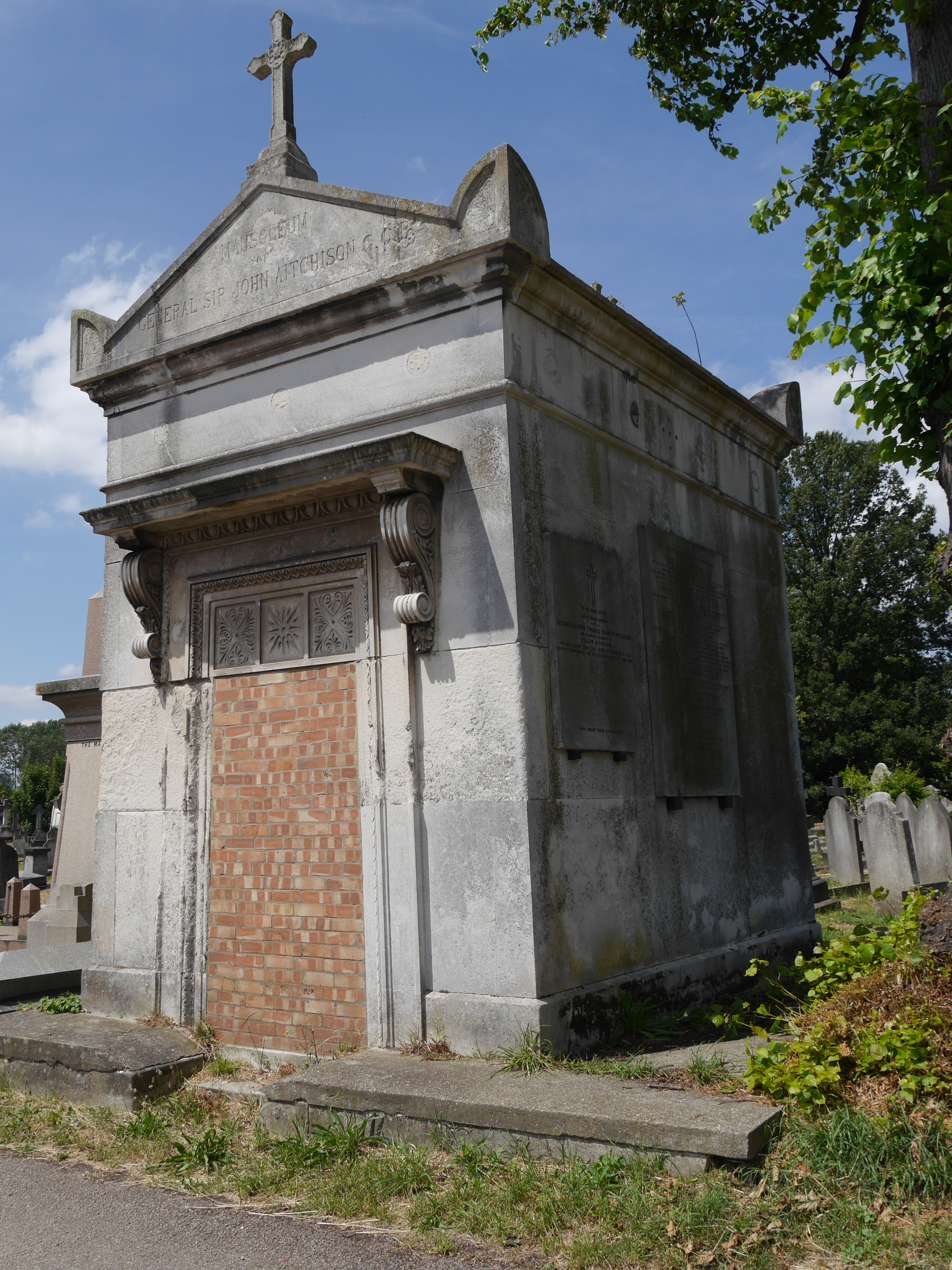
Kensal Green Cemetery mausoleum

General Sir John Aitchison GCB (25 April 1779 – 12 May 1875) was a British Army officer.

== Military career ==
Aitchison was commissioned at 16 into the 3rd Regiment of Foot Guards, later to be the Scots Guards. He took part in the crossing of the River Douro during the Peninsular War. He fought at the Battle of Talavera in July 1809, the Battle of Bussaco in September 1810 and the Battle of Salamanca in July 1812 before seeing action at the Battle of Vitoria in June 1813, the Siege of San Sebastián in July 1813 and the Battle of Nivelle in November 1813. He also fought at the Battle of the Nive in December 1813 and Battle of Bayonne in April 1814 and went on to become Major General on the staff of the Madras Presidency in 1845.

He was colonel of the 72nd Regiment, Duke of Albany's Own Highlanders from 1851 to 1870 and of the Scots Fusilier Guards from 1870 to his death. He was promoted full general on 30 July 1860.

He died in 1875 and was buried at Kensal Green Cemetery in a mausoleum west of the main chapel.

Aitchison married in 1857 Ellen Elizabeth Mayhew (c1826–1896), and had one son:

- Archibald John Aitchison (c1861–1908), who married in 1903 Evelyn Charlotte Ram, daughter of Rev. George Stopford Ram and Hon. Mrs. Ram (née Hon. Charlotte Anne O′Bren, daughter of 13th Baron Inchiquin).

Military offices
Preceded by Sir John Woodford	Colonel of the Scots Fusilier Guards; 1870–1875	Succeeded by Lord Rokeby
