= Inigo Jones (British Army officer) =

British Army general (1848–1914)

Major-General Inigo Jones CB CVO
- Born: Inigo Richmund Jones; 23 September 1848; Worton Hall, Isleworth
- Died: 20 July 1914 (aged 65); Westminster, London
- Military career
- Allegiance: United Kingdom
- Branch: British Army
- Service years: 1866–1907
- Rank: Major-General
- Commands: Troops in the Straits Settlements
- Conflicts: Suakin Expedition; Second Boer War
- Awards: Companion of the Order of the Bath; Commander of the Royal Victorian Order

Major-General Inigo Richmund Jones, CB, CVO (23 September 1848 – 20 July 1914) was a British Army officer who commanded the Guards brigade during the Second Boer War, and later was general officer commanding the Troops in the Straits Settlements.

== Military career ==
Jones was commissioned into the Scots Guards in 1866. He served in the Suakin Expedition in 1885. After the outbreak of the Second Boer War in late 1899, Colonel Jones was the officer in command of the 2nd Battalion of his regiment as 1120 officers and men left Southampton for South Africa on the SS Britannic in March 1900. On arrival, the battalion was attached to the 16th Infantry Brigade serving as part of the 8th Division under Sir Leslie Rundle. They took part in the Battle of Paardeberg. Jones was appointed in command of the Guards Brigade in April 1900. He was mentioned in despatches by Lord Kitchener dated 23 June 1902. For his service in the war he was appointed a Companion of the Order of the Bath (CB) in the April 1901 South Africa Honours list (the award was dated to 29 November 1900; he only received the actual decoration from King Edward VII at Buckingham Palace on 24 October 1902). Following the end of the war in June 1902, Jones left Cape Town in the SS Carisbrook Castle in September 1902, arriving at Southampton early the following month.

He subsequently became commanding officer of the Scots Guards and on 23 September 1905 was promoted to major general. He went on to become general officer commanding the Troops in the Straits Settlements on 24 November before retiring from the army in 1907. He lived at Kelston Park, Somerset.

== Family ==
In 1878 he married Alice Charlotte Matilda Dawson; they had three daughters. She died in 1885. In 1888 he married Elinor Margaret Charteris, granddaughter of the 7th Earl of Wemyss & March; they had one daughter and one son.

Military offices
Preceded by Arthur Dorward	GOC Troops in the Straits Settlements; 1905–1907	Succeeded by Thomas Perrott
