= Peter Ottewill =

British George medal recipient (1915–2003)

Peter Guy Ottewill
- Born: 5 November 1915; Greenwich
- Died: 31 January 2003 (aged 87); Reigate
- Military career
- Allegiance: United Kingdom
- Branch: Royal Air Force
- Service years: 1931-1965
- Rank: Group Captain
- Nickname: Otters
- Unit: Anti-aircraft
- Commands: RAF South Cerney
- Conflicts: World War II
- Awards: George Medal
- Other work: Farmer, charity worker

Peter Guy Ottewill GM AFC (5 November 1915 – 31 January 2003) was an English RAF officer who during the Second World War in 1943 rescued two airmen from a Bristol Beaufighter which had crashed into an ammunition store at RAF Kirknewton during take-off, and was awarded the George Medal.

Educated at The John Roan School, he joined the RAF in 1931. Initially an armourer, he trained as a Hurricane pilot, serving with 43 Squadron at the evacuation of Dunkirk; and was one of the first servicemen ever to have plastic surgery. The George Medal citation said:

One day in June, 1943, a Beaufighter aircraft crashed into an ammunition store when taking off and immediately caught fire. Both occupants of the aircraft were stunned and unable to get out unaided. Despite the bursting of the aircraft's war load of ammunition (which included cannon shells), the 30,000 rounds of ammunition which were exploding in the store and the grave danger of the petrol tanks exploding, Sqn Ldr Ottewill, accompanied by 2 others, went to the scene of the accident in an endeavour to rescue the crew. Sqn Ldr Ottewill, ignoring a burning petrol tank, jumped onto the wing and after opening the front hatch, he succeeded in releasing the pilot and dragged him clear. Sqn Ldr Ottewill then returned and rescued the observer who was in happened. Shortly afterwards a petrol tank exploded. Sqn Ldr Ottewill, who had been severely burned on a previous occasion when his own aircraft was shot down by the enemy, accepted the risk of further severe burns, and injury in going to the assistance of his comrades and effecting their rescue. Fortunately he sustained only slight burns during this rescue.

After the war he was seconded to the Royal Australian Air Force and served in Korea. He was then a Staff Officer with 2nd Tactical Air Force and worked at NATO headquarters before his final post as a Station commander.
