= Thomas Perrott =

British Army general

Major-General Sir Thomas Perrott KCB
- Born: 5 March 1851
- Died: 3 November 1919 (aged 68); Chichester, West Sussex
- Military career
- Allegiance: United Kingdom
- Branch: British Army
- Service years: 1870–1913; 1914–1915
- Rank: Major-General
- Commands: Troops in the Straits Settlements
- Conflicts: Second Boer War; World War I
- Awards: Knight Commander of the Order of the Bath

Major-General Sir Thomas Perrott KCB (5 March 1851 – 3 November 1919) was a British Army officer who commanded the Troops in the Straits Settlements.

== Military career ==
Perrott was commissioned into the Royal Artillery in 1870. He was appointed Assistant Superintendent of Experiments at the School of Gunnery in 1885, Assistant Inspector of Warlike Stores in 1891 and Chief Instructor at the School of Gunnery in 1896. He served in the Second Boer War before reverting to the post of Chief Instructor at the School of Gunnery in 1902. He went on to be Colonel on the Staff of the Commander of the Royal Artillery at Thames District in 1904, Commander of the Royal Garrison Artillery at Thames and Medway Coast Defence in 1905 and Brigadier-General commanding the Scottish Coast Defences in 1906. Promoted in December 1906 to major general, he was made General Officer Commanding the Troops in the Straits Settlements in 1907 and Commander, Royal Artillery in Gibraltar in 1910 before retiring in 1913. He was recalled at the start of World War I as Inspector of Royal Horse Artillery and Royal Field Artillery in 1914 and retired again in 1915.

He died at Hambrook Grange near Chichester.

Military offices
Preceded by Inigo Jones	GOC Troops in the Straits Settlements; 1907–1910	Succeeded by Theodore Stephenson
