= Queen's Own Highlanders (Seaforth and Camerons) =

Military unit in the British Army

- Cap badge of the Queen's Own Highlanders
- Active: 1961–1994
- Country: United Kingdom
- Branch: British Army
- Type: Line Infantry
- Role: Armoured infantry latterly. Originally Light infantry
- Size: One Battalion
- Part of: Scottish Division
- Garrison/HQ: Dreghorn Barracks, Edinburgh originally Fort George
- Nickname: The Blue Mafia
- Motto: Cuidich 'n Righ (Help the King)
- Colors: Blue and Buff Facings.
- March: Quick: Pibroch o Donal Dubh/March of the Cameron Men/Cabarfeidh (Also a Military Band/Pipes called Queen's Own Highlanders used to march off)
- Mascot: The informal regimental nickname of the stags head cap badge was "Hector".
- Engagements: Brunei: 1962; Borneo: 1963; Northern Ireland: 8 tours between Nov 1971 – May 1993; Operation Corporate: 1982; Gulf War: 1991

Commanders
- Last Colonel-in-Chief: The Duke of Edinburgh

Insignia
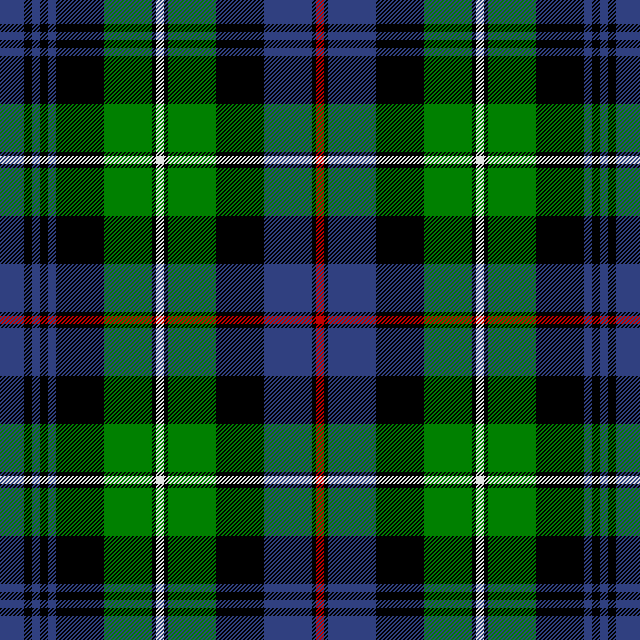
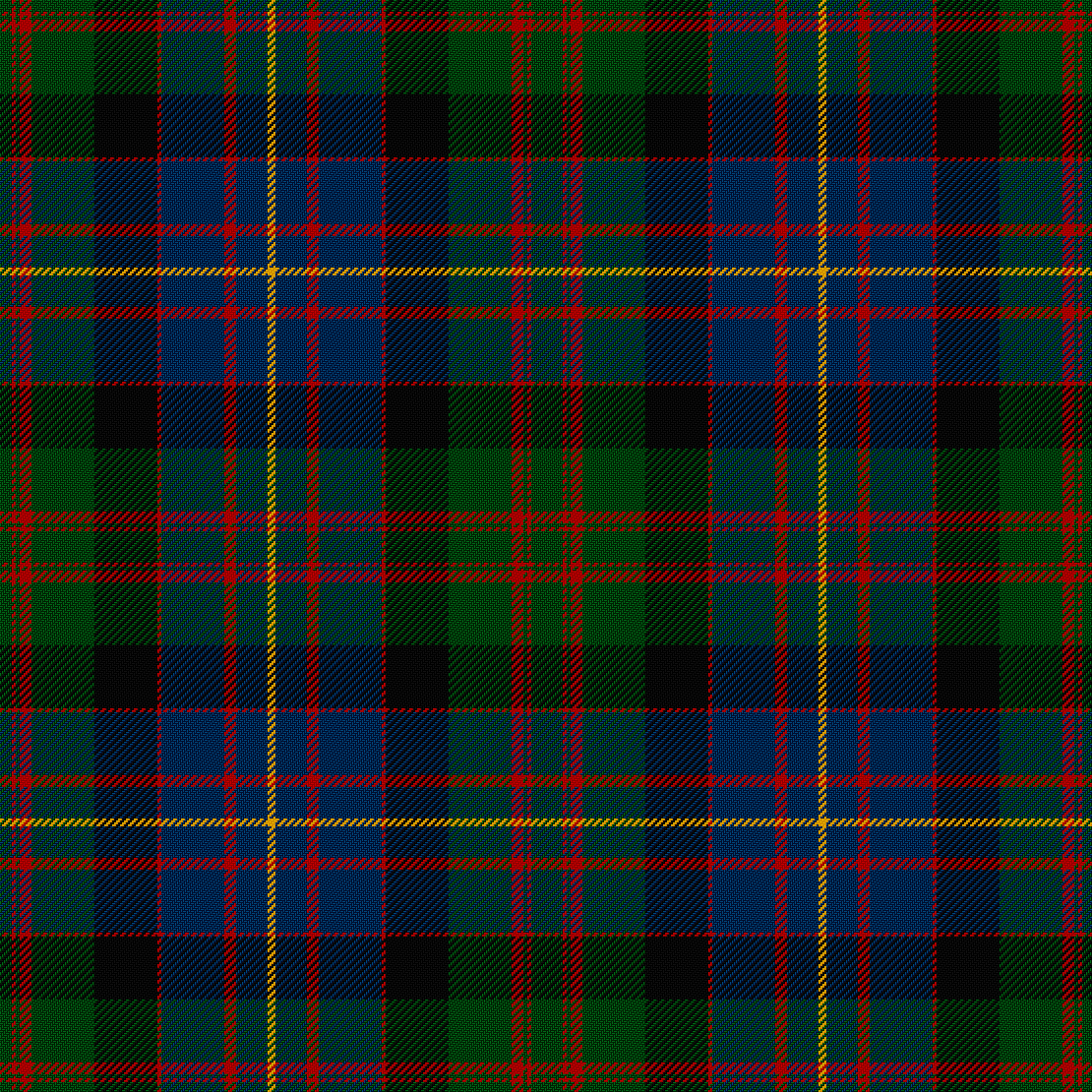
- Tartan: Kilt: Mackenzie, (Seaforth), (left); Trews: Cameron of Erracht, (right); Reverse: for pipers, drummers and band members

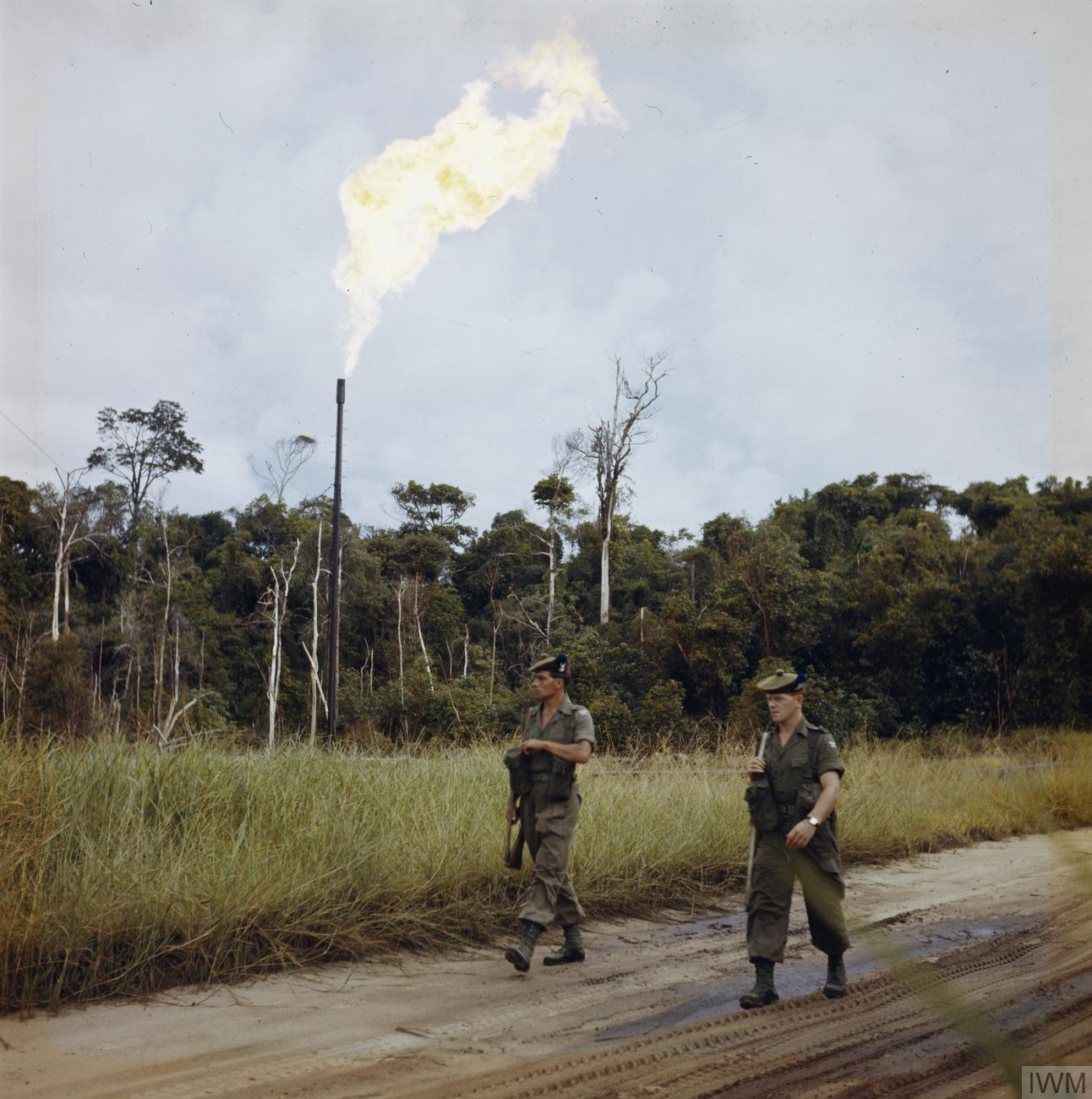
Queen's Own Highlanders on guard at the Seria oilfield, during the Brunei revolt, December 1962

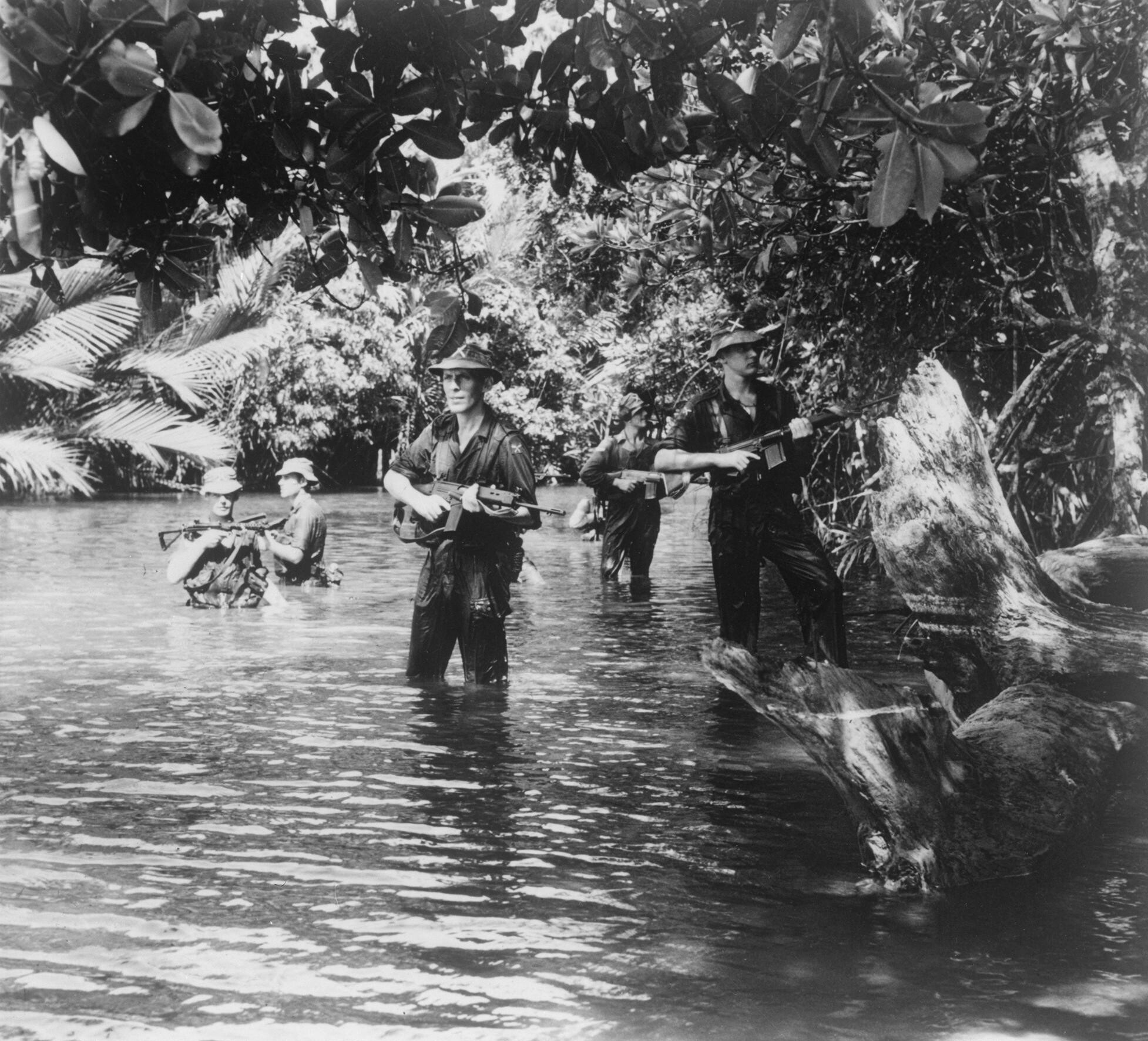
Troops from the Queen's Own Highlanders searching for enemies during a patrol in 1963 during the Indonesia–Malaysia confrontation

The Queen's Own Highlanders (Seaforth and Camerons), officially abbreviated "QO HLDRS," was an infantry regiment of the British Army, part of the Scottish Division. It was in existence from 1961 to 1994.

== History ==
=== 1961–1970 ===
The regiment was formed on 7 February 1961 at Redford Barracks, Edinburgh, with the amalgamation of 1st Battalion, Seaforth Highlanders and 1st Battalion, Queen's Own Cameron Highlanders to form the 1st Battalion, Queen's Own Highlanders. This was a part of the defence reforms originally announced in the 1957 Defence White Paper, which saw a reduction in the size of the British Army to reflect the end of National Service.

The battalion was sent to Singapore in April 1961 from where it was deployed to Brunei in December 1962 in order to help suppress the Brunei Revolt at an early stage of the Indonesia–Malaysia confrontation. This included a successful air assault on the rebel–held Shell oilfields at Seria, with the airfield quickly recaptured and 48 hostages released. Returning to Singapore in February 1962, the battalion went back to Borneo three months later for a further operational tour, mainly consisting of long patrols and manning outlying garrisons on the border with Indonesia.

On return to Scotland in January 1964, the battalion was based at Milton Bridge Camp, a former facility for German Prisoners of War, located south east of Glencorse Barracks. In June 1964 the battalion moved to Mercer Barracks at Osnabrück Garrison, part of British Army of the Rhine, remaining there until August 1966 when it moved to Wavell Barracks in Berlin. The battalion returned to Redford Barracks in September 1968 from where units were deployed to Sharjah on the Persian Gulf in May 1969, while in July 1970 it undertook ceremonial duties at that year's Commonwealth Games in Edinburgh.

=== 1971–1982 ===
In April 1971 the battalion returned to Osnabrück Garrison, from where they were deployed for a total of three separate four–month operational tours at the height of the Troubles in Northern Ireland: November 1971 – March 1972 (East Belfast); July – October 1972: (Dungannon) and December 1973 – April 1974 (West Belfast). In June 1976 the battalion returned to Scotland, this time to Ritchie Camp, West Lothian, from where parts of the battalion were deployed to Belize, Gibraltar and twice to Northern Ireland, April – August 1978 (North Armagh) and July – December 1979 (South Armagh). During this tour, the battalion's commanding officer, Lieutenant-Colonel David Blair, was killed by one of two roadside bombs that took the lives of a total of eighteen soldiers at Warrenpoint, County Down. A total of seven Queen's Own Highlanders were killed in Northern Ireland between 1973 and 1990.

In March 1980 the battalion was despatched for a tour at Stanley Fort in Hong Kong before moving to Tidworth in November 1981. In spite of it then being the Army's Spearhead battalion – kept in readiness for rapid deployment worldwide – it did not take part in the fighting that commenced in April 1982. It was, however, stationed in the Falkland Islands, immediately after the ceasefire, from July – December 1982, and led the operation to restore normality on the islands. This work resulted in the award to the regiment of the Wilkinson Sword of Peace, bestowed annually on the unit of the British Armed Forces that has made the greatest contribution to community relations.

=== 1983–1994 ===
In November 1983, the battalion moved to Alexander Barracks, Aldergrove, as the Northern Ireland resident battalion, and on to Fort George in November 1985. In March 1988 the battalion moved to Buller Barracks in Münster, Germany, from where units were again deployed to Northern Ireland for five months from March 1990 (Belfast) and to Saudi Arabia in January 1991, where they took part in the Gulf War. In the Gulf, the battalion was split up to support other units, including attachments to the 1st Royal Scots and 3rd Royal Regiment of Fusiliers (3RRF) to bring these units up to strength. Three Queen's Own Highlanders serving with 3 RRF were among eleven soldiers killed in a friendly fire incident, when two US A-10 aircraft mistakenly bombed a UK armoured column. After the war, the battalion returned to Münster with a further six month deployment to Northern Ireland (Belfast) from November 1992. The battalion returned to Scotland in October 1993 and moved into Dreghorn Barracks, near Edinburgh.

Due to the Options for Change defence review the battalion was amalgamated with 1st Battalion, Gordon Highlanders on 17 September 1994 to form 1st Battalion, Highlanders (Seaforth, Gordons and Camerons). There was a high–profile, although ultimately unsuccessful, campaign to stop the proposed amalgamation.

== Territorial Army and Cadet Force ==
After the formation of the Queen's Own Highlanders in February 1961, the part–time Territorial Army units of the pre-amalgamation regiments continued unchanged, with the 11th battalion, Seaforth Highlanders (TA) and the 4/5 battalion Cameron Highlanders (TA). In April 1967 both were disbanded on the formation of the 3rd (Territorial) battalion, Queen's Own Highlanders, which was itself disbanded in March 1969. From then on, the part–time element of all Highland regiments were included within the 51st Highland Volunteers.

The Army Cadet Force (ACF) units in the northern counties of Scotland retained the designation and cap badges of the Seaforth and Cameron Highlanders until 1968, when they became the North Highland ACF and adopted the Queen's Own Highlanders badge. In 1975 they became the 1st Cadet Battalion Queen's Own Highlanders ACF and, in April 1982, the Queen's Own Highlanders Battalion ACF. In September 1999 the battalion was re-badged under the Highlanders (Seaforth, Gordons and Camerons) and renamed to 1st Battalion The Highlanders, Army Cadet Force.

== Regimental museum ==
The Highlanders' Museum (Queen's Own Highlanders Collection) is based at Fort George, near Inverness, Scotland.

== Tartans ==
The regiment wore the Mackenzie tartan kilt (as worn by the former Seaforth Highlanders) and Cameron of Erracht tartan trews, with the reverse for pipers, drummers and band members.

== Colonel-in-Chief ==
- 1961–1994: Field Marshal HRH The Prince Philip, Duke of Edinburgh, KG KT OM ONZ AK GCVO GBE QSO GCL CC CMM CD PC ADC

== Regimental colonels ==
Colonels of the regiment were:

- 1961–1966: F.M. Sir Archibald James Halkett Cassels, GCB, KBE, DSO (ex Seaforth Highlanders)
- 1966–1975: Gen. Sir Peter Mervyn Hunt, GCB, DSO, OBE, ADC
- 1975–1983: Lt-Gen. Sir Chandos Blair, KCVO, OBE, MC
- 1983–1994: Maj-Gen. John Charles Oswald Rooke Hopkinson, CB
- 1994: amalgamated with The Gordon Highlanders to form The Highlanders (Seaforth, Gordons and Camerons)

== Allied regiments ==
The regiment had the following alliances:

- Canada - The Cameron Highlanders of Ottawa (Duke of Edinburgh's Own)
- Canada - The Queen's Own Cameron Highlanders of Canada
- Canada - The Seaforth Highlanders of Canada
- Australia - The Royal Western Australia Regiment
- Australia - The Royal South Australia Regiment
- Australia - The 5th/6th Battalion, Royal Victoria Regiment historical alliance via 37th/52nd Battalion (Australia)
- New Zealand - 4th (Otago and Southland) Battalion, The Royal New Zealand Infantry Regiment
- New Zealand - 7th (Wellington and Hawkes Bay) Battalion, The Royal New Zealand Infantry Regiment
