= RAF Kirknewton =

Former RAF station in Scotland

RAF Kirknewton
- Near Kirknewton, West Lothian in Scotland
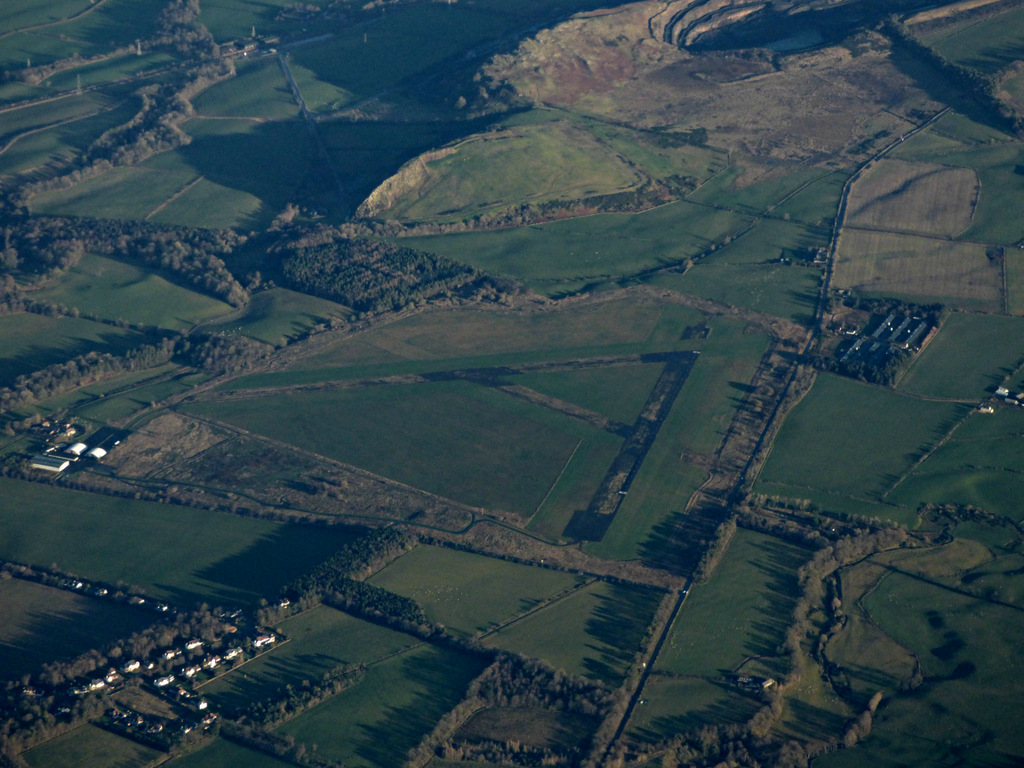
- Kirknewton Airfield

- Ut Aquilae Volent (That Eagles May Fly)

Site information
- Type: Royal Air Force station
- Owner: Ministry of Defence
- Operator: Royal Air Force
- Controlled by: No. 22 Group (Training)

Location
- Shown within Edinburgh RAF Kirknewton (the United Kingdom)
- Coordinates: 55°52′31″N 003°23′51″W
- Area: 95 hectares

Site history
- Built: 1941
- In use: 1941–present
- Fate: Retained by the MOD and used for gliding.
- Battles/wars: European theatre of World War II; Cold War

Garrison information
- Occupants: No. 661 Volunteer Gliding Squadron

Airfield information
- Identifiers: ICAO: EGKT
- Elevation: 201 metres (659 ft) AMSL
Runways
Direction	Length and surface
00/00	Concrete
00/00	Concrete

Royal Air Force Kirknewton, otherwise known as RAF Kirknewton, is a Royal Air Force station at Whitemoss, a mile south east of Kirknewton, West Lothian, Scotland. It is retained by the Ministry of Defence, as Kirknewton Airfield and is home to 661 Volunteer Gliding Squadron.

== History ==
Primarily an RAF radar station, RAF Kirknewton was home to a variety of units during the Second World War. No. 289 Squadron RAF was formed there as an anti-aircraft co-operation unit on 20 November 1941. In June 1943, RAF Kirknewton was the site of an outstanding act of bravery when Sqn Ldr Peter Guy Ottewill rescued two airmen from a burning Bristol Beaufighter, earning a George Medal.

RAF Kirknewton was also used as a temporary prisoner of war camp for German officers during the War, while they were awaiting transfer to the USA. Also at that time, the area in trees to the west of the airfield (which has now been redeveloped for housing) was used for additional accommodation and was known as Ritchie Camp.

From 1952 to 1966, Kirknewton was home to several small United States Air Force units tasked with providing mobile radio facilities in Britain. These units included 6952nd Security Group, formerly the 6952nd Radio Squadron Mobile, United States Air Force Security Service (USAFSS). Around 500 American service personnel were tasked with the interception of voice and Morse signals, including military and commercial naval traffic, with priority being given to signals involving Soviet radar and air operations. The airfield returned to UK control during the late 1960s.

Between 1968 and 1986, some of the airfield buildings were used by the battalions resident in Ritchie Camp as mechanical transport workshops and garaging. The airfield was used for driver training and for low level tactical training.

As part of the Future Force 2020 budgetary announcement in July 2011, Kirknewton was to have been developed into a major British Army base to host a Multi-Role Brigade and both Dreghorn Barracks and Redford Barracks were earmarked for disposal. However plans to develop Kirknewton as an army barracks were scrapped in March 2013.

== Current use ==
Kirknewton houses No. 661 Volunteer Gliding Squadron, flying a fleet of four Grob Viking T1 gliders and providing flying experience and training to members of the Royal Air Force Air Cadets.

Several private recreational planes are also based at the airfield.

== Units ==
Current units based at Kirknewton Airfield.

No. 22 Group (Training) RAF

- No. 2 Flying Training School
  - No. 661 Volunteer Gliding Squadron – Grob Viking T1

== See also ==
- Armed forces in Scotland
- Military history of Scotland
- List of former Royal Air Force stations
- United States Air Force in the United Kingdom
