= Ritchie Camp =

Military base in Scotland

- Kirknewton, West Lothian

Site information
- Type: Barracks
- Owner: Ministry of Defence
- Operator: British Army

Location
- Location within West Lothian
- Coordinates: 55°52′17″N 3°25′00″W

Site history
- Built: 1940s
- Built for: War Office
- In use: 1940s-1999

Ritchie Camp was a military base located near Kirknewton, West Lothian in Scotland.

== History ==
Ritchie Camp was initially established during World War II to provide accommodation for units based at RAF Kirknewton. After the War it provided accommodation for United States Air Force units based there.

As part of the drawdown of British Forces from West Germany, the 1st Battalion The Black Watch returned from Minden in March 1968 and were stationed at Ritchie Camp before moving in January 1972 to Hong Kong.

In 1971, it was announced that the 1st Battalion The Argyll and Sutherland Highlanders were to be reformed. At that time, Balaklava Company, The Argyll and Sutherland Highlanders were based in Gibraltar. They returned home, via Barnard Castle, County Durham and became the nucleus of the new battalion which assembled in Ritchie Camp. From here they undertook 3 tours of duty in Northern Ireland. Amongst visitors to the regiment were the Queen, the Duke of Edinburgh and Princess Anne.

When the battalion moved to Osnabrück in November 1974, the 1st Battalion The Royal Scots took up residence, arriving from Cyprus, til June 1976 when they moved to Munster. They were replaced by the 1st Battalion The Queen's Own Highlanders from Osnabrück in June 1976, leaving in March 1980 for Hong Kong.

The 1st Battalion The Gordon Highlanders, transferring from Chester in March 1980, were resident in Ritchie Camp until February 1983, when they moved on to Hemer. In 1981, they were participants in the wedding of The Prince of Wales and Lady Diana Spencer.

In February 1983, they moved to Hemer, when the 1st Battalion The Royal Scots moved in from Ballykinler. They moved in March 1985 to Werl, handing over the camp to The 1st Battalion The Black Watch who had been in Werl. After a short stay, they moved a few miles to Redford Barracks, Edinburgh in April 1986.

Responding to a Commons Written Question on 26 February 1987, the Secretary of State for Defence stated that 'We have recently agreed in principle to make these sites (Winston camp, Lanark, and Ritchie camp, Kirknewton) available to the United States forces for use as peacetime medical storage facilities and as hospitals which would be activated in the event of war.' The Americans handed the site back to the MoD in 1991, when it was described as a Contingency Hospital.

A Tree Preservation Order was placed on Ritchie Camp in December 1987.

The Princess Royal, Patron, Crucial Crew Project, attended a Crucial Crew event hosted by the Lothian and Borders Police 'F' Division at Ritchie Camp on 13 June 1993.

In 1999, the camp was demolished and replaced with up-market housing, and the area renamed 'Newlands'.
