= Guards Division =

- Active: 1968–2022
- Country: United Kingdom
- Branch: British Army
- Role: Administration and training
- Size: Division
- Part of: London District
- Garrison/HQ: Wellington Barracks, London

The Guards Division was an administrative unit of the British Army responsible for the training and administration of the regiments of Foot Guards and the London Guards reserve battalion. The Guards Division was responsible for providing two battalions for public duties to London District (plus three incremental companies); although the guards are most associated with ceremony, they are nevertheless operational infantry battalions, and as such perform all the various roles of infantry. In 2022, the Guards Division was renamed as the Guards and Parachute Division.

== Current units ==
As of 2020, units comprised the Guards Division Headquarters, at Wellington Barracks, Westminster:

Guards battalions:

- 1st Battalion, Grenadier Guards
- 1st Battalion, Coldstream Guards
- 1st Battalion, Scots Guards
- 1st Battalion, Irish Guards
- 2nd Battalion, Irish Guards
- 1st Battalion, Welsh Guards
- 1st Battalion, London Guards (Reserve) (Note: The London Guards is the name of the Guards reserve battalion, which is made up of four companies individually cap badged as Grenadier Guards, Coldstream Guards, Scots Guards and Irish Guards.)
  - Ypres Company, Grenadier Guards, in Kingston upon Thames
  - No 17 Company, Coldstream Guards, in Hammersmith
  - G (Messines) Company, Scots Guards, in Clapham Junction
  - No 15 (Loos) Company, Irish Guards, in Camberwell

Guards incremental companies:

- Nijmegen Company, Grenadier Guards
- No 7 Company, Coldstream Guards
- F Company, Scots Guards
- No 9 Company, Irish Guards
- No 12 Company, Irish Guards
- Guards Squadron, 22 SAS
- Guards Parachute Company

== Past units ==
Past units include (dates when they were part of the division):

- 2nd Battalion, Grenadier Guards (1968–1994), reduced to Nijmegen Company
- 2nd Battalion, Coldstream Guards (1968–1993), reduced to No. 7 Company
- 2nd Battalion, Scots Guards (1968–1971, reduced to 2 Scots Guards Company in 1st Battalion, re-instated 1972–1993), reduced to F Company
- Band of the Grenadier Guards (1968–1994), transferred to Royal Corps of Army Music (CAMUS) on formation of that corps
- Band of the Coldstream Guards (1968–1994), transferred to CAMUS
- Band of the Scots Guards (1968–1994), transferred to CAMUS
- Band of the Irish Guards (1968–1994), transferred to CAMUS
- Band of the Welsh Guards (1968–1994), transferred to CAMUS
- London Regiment (2017–2022), redesignated as London Guards

Note: The three 2nd battalions have technically not been disbanded; instead they are in "suspended animation" and, in theory, can be re-raised if needed. The colours and traditions of each battalion are kept and maintained by the incremental companies.

== Telling the regiments apart ==
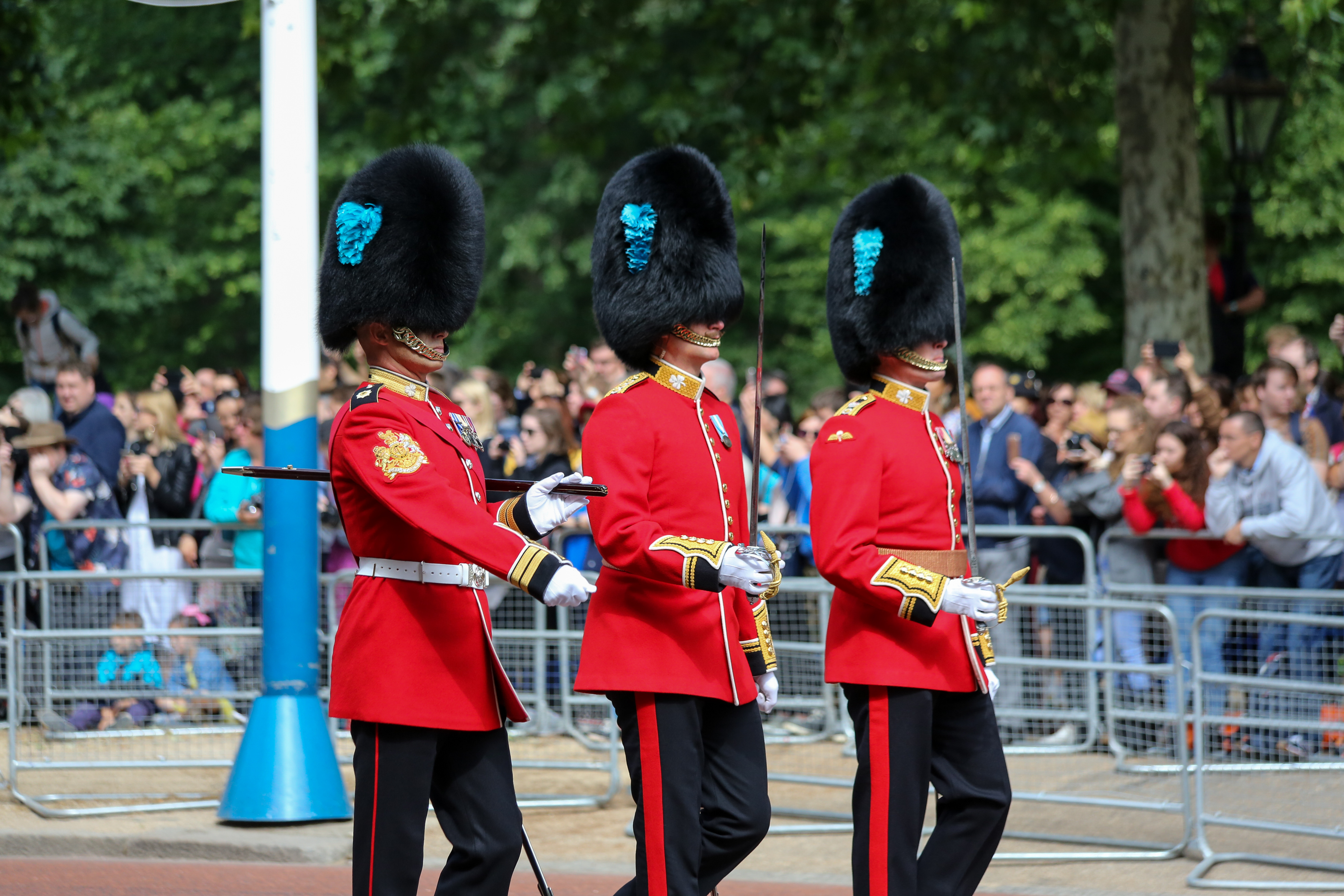
Two officers and a Warrant Officer class I of the Irish Guards – in this image the blue plume can be seen on the right hand side of the bearskin, the tunic buttons are grouped in fours, and the shamrock badge is on the collar. The Officer on the far side has a parachute badge indicating he's trained to deploy as a parachutist.

The five regiments of foot guards are most often seen in full dress uniform, comprising navy trousers, scarlet tunic and bearskin cap. From a distance they appear identical, but there are ways to distinguish between the regiments:

- The colour of the plume, and which side of the bearskin it is worn on
- The spacing of the tunic buttons
- The badge worn on the collar
- The badge worn on the shoulder

Regiment	Plume	Plume colour	Button spacing	Collar badge	Shoulder badge
Grenadier Guards	Left	White	Singly	Grenade	Royal Cypher
Coldstream Guards	Right	Red	Pairs	Garter Star	Rose
Scots Guards	—N/a	—N/a	Threes	Thistle	Thistle Star
Irish Guards	Right	Blue	Fours	Shamrock	St Patrick Star
Welsh Guards	Left	White; Green; White	Fives	Leek	Leek

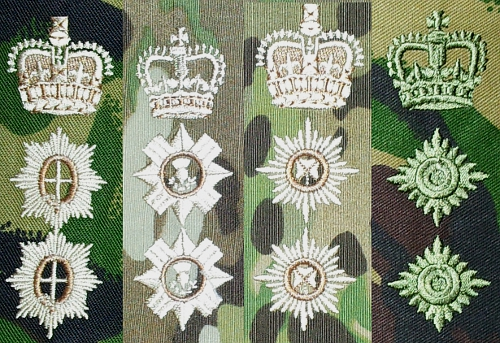
The rank insignia for officers are also differentiated by what specific stars are used. Left to right: Rank slides used by Grenadier, Coldstream, and Welsh Guards. Rank slides used by Scots Guards. Rank slides used by Irish Guards. Standard rank slides used by other army officers.

== Guards Parachute Platoon ==
6 Platoon, B Company, 3rd Battalion, Parachute Regiment is manned by volunteers from the Guards Division and Household Cavalry

== UK Special Forces ==
Although no longer directly associated with the Guards, G Squadron 22 SAS was formed in 1966 following the performance of the Guards Independent Parachute Company under Major LGS Head in support of SAS Operations in Borneo.

== See also ==
- Household Cavalry
- Household Division
- King's Troop, Royal Horse Artillery
- Guards Division for the tactical formation active in World War I (and briefly at the end of World War II)
- Guards Armoured Division for the tactical formation active in World War II

List of bands:

- Band of the Grenadier Guards
- Band of the Coldstream Guards
- Band of the Scots Guards
- Band of the Irish Guards
- Band of the Welsh Guards

== Sources ==
- Heyman, Charles (2012). The British Army: A Pocket Guide, 2012–2013. Pen & Sword. ISBN 9781848841079.
