= London Guards =

Military unit

1st Battalion London Guards
- Badge of 1st Battalion London Guards
- Active: 1908–2022 (as London Regiment); 2022–present (as London Guards)
- Country: United Kingdom
- Branch: British Army
- Type: Infantry
- Role: Light Role Infantry
- Size: One Battalion (450 personnel)
- Part of: London District
- Garrison/HQ: St John's Hill, London
- Engagements: Iraq War; Operation Herrick
- Website: army.mod.uk/london-guards/

Commanders
- Colonel of the Regiment: Prince Edward, Duke of Edinburgh
- Regimental Lieutenant Colonel: Major General Marc Overton

Insignia
- Tactical Recognition Flash

The London Guards is an administrative organisation of the British Army covering the reserve companies of the Grenadier, Coldstream, Scots and Irish Guards. On formation, these companies drew their personnel from the London Regiment, which traces its history back to the formation of that regiment in 1908, when 26 separate Volunteer Force battalions were brought together. The London Guards is not a regiment; the companies wear the uniform and follow the traditions of their foot guards regiment.

== History ==
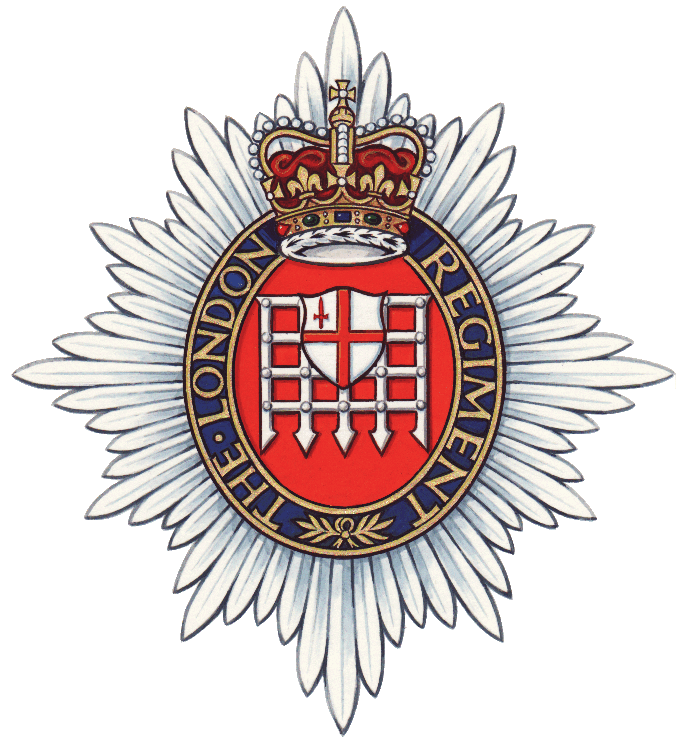
Badge of the former London Regiment

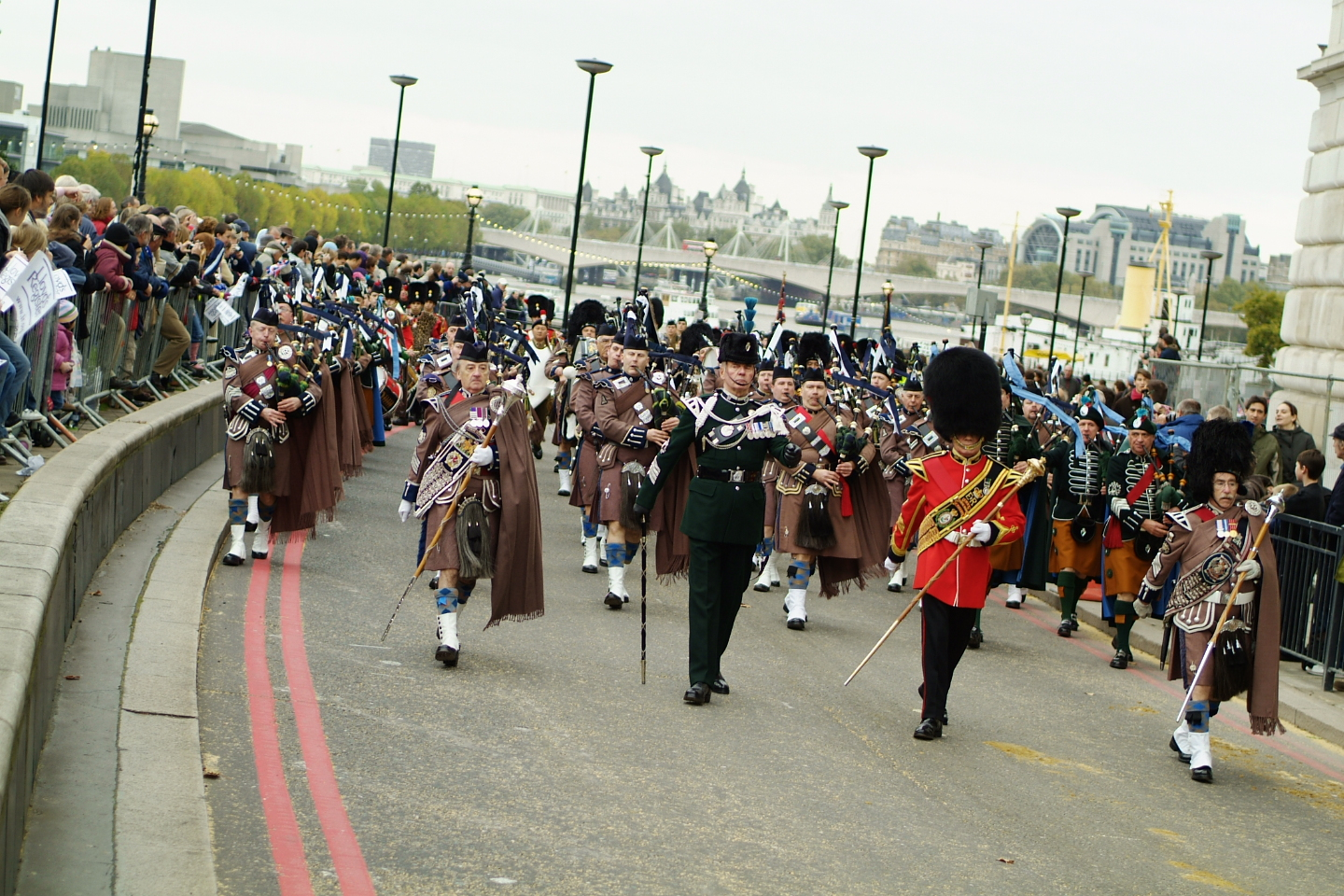
Pipes & drums of A and D Companies and the Corps of Drums of C Company at the Lord Mayor's Show in 2006

The London Regiment was reformed in 1993 through the re-regimentation of some of the remaining successors of the original regiment (excluding, for example, the Artists Rifles or the Kensington Regiment (Princess Louise's)), which were part of a number of different TA infantry units:

- 8th (Volunteer) Battalion, Queen's Fusiliers (8QF)
- 1st Battalion, 51st Highland Volunteers (1/51 HIGHLAND)
- 4th (Volunteer) Battalion, Royal Irish Rangers (North Irish Militia) (4 R IRISH)

In 1992, the London Scottish, which formed G Company 1/51 HIGHLAND, and the London Irish Rifles, who were D Company 4 R IRISH, were transferred to 8QF in preparation for its conversion in 1993 to the London Regiment. On formation of the regiment, one of the original companies of the former Queen's Regiment, A Company, was disbanded, leaving the new regiment's order of battle as:

- RHQ and HQ (Anzio) Company at Battersea (former RHQ location for 8QF; Anzio was chosen as a battle honour common to the antecedents of the four rifle companies)
- A (The London Scottish) Company at Westminster and Catford
- B (Queen's Regiment) Company at Edgware and Hornsey
- C (City of London Fusiliers) Company at Balham and Camberwell
- D (London Irish Rifles) Company at Chelsea (Duke of York's HQ)

Two companies of the Royal Green Jackets, F and G Companies, formed part of the regiment between 1998 and 2006.

In 2004, elements of the London Regiment were deployed to Iraq.

Following the restructuring of the British Army in 2004, it was announced that the Guards Division would gain a Territorial Army battalion. This saw the London Regiment retaining its name and multi-badge structure, while transferring from the Queen's Division to the Guards Division. The two Royal Green Jackets companies were transferred to the Royal Rifle Volunteers in preparation for the formation of The Rifles in 2007.

In July 2017, B Company was transferred to the Princess of Wales's Royal Regiment to become B Company, 4th Battalion The Princess of Wales's Royal Regiment; and C Company was transferred to the Royal Regiment of Fusiliers to become C Company, 5th Battalion The Royal Regiment of Fusiliers. To replace these two sub-units, F Company, 7th Battalion The Rifles returned to the London Regiment, and a new G Company was raised. In addition to the restructuring, the regiment was moved under command of the 11th Infantry Brigade and Headquarters South East and designated the “Guards reserve battalion”. In 2020, a FOI response stated it also fell under HQ London District.

Regimental Headquarters, Battersea HQ (London Irish Rifles) Company, Camberwell A (The London Scottish) Company, Westminster and Mortar Platoon, Catford F (Rifles) Company, Hammersmith G (Guards) Company, Kingston upon Thames

In 2021, under the Future Soldier programme of the Integrated Review, it was announced that the London Regiment would lose its regimental status and be redesignated 1st Battalion London Guards by February 2024. The former companies of the London Regiment became reserve companies of the four senior Foot Guards regiments, with soldiers transferred accordingly. For the 2023 Trooping the Colour, the London Guards provided street liners to enable a larger parade than in recent years.

== Conversion to Foot Guards ==
In April 2022, the London Regiment was redesignated 1st Battalion London Guards and ceased to exist as a regiment in its own right, with its companies transitioning to become reserve companies of the four senior Foot Guards regiments. The London Guards is not a regiment; the companies wear the uniform and follow the traditions of their Foot Guards regiment.

Deputy Honorary Colonels for the former companies (representing regimental identities on the London Regiment's Regimental Council) remained in post for one year, after which they were replaced by senior representatives of the respective Foot Guards regiments. The administrative Headquarters is at St John's Hill, with reserve Foot Guards companies at:

- Ypres Company, Grenadier Guards (formerly G (Guards) Company), Kingston upon Thames
- No. 17 Company, Coldstream Guards (formerly F (Rifles) Company), Hammersmith
- G (Messines) Company, Scots Guards (formerly A (London Scottish) Company), Clapham Junction
- No. 15 (Loos) Company, Irish Guards (formerly HQ (London Irish Rifles) Company), Camberwell.

While most officers and soldiers wear the uniform of their regiments, three individuals—the Colonel, the Lieutenant Colonel, and the Commanding Officer can wear a London Guards uniform, featuring London Guards stars on the collar and buttons representing four Foot Guards regiments.

On 9 July 2023, the 1st Battalion London Guards were presented with Colours by the Regimental Colonel, Prince Edward, Duke of Edinburgh, in a ceremony at Buckingham Palace.

== Order of precedence ==
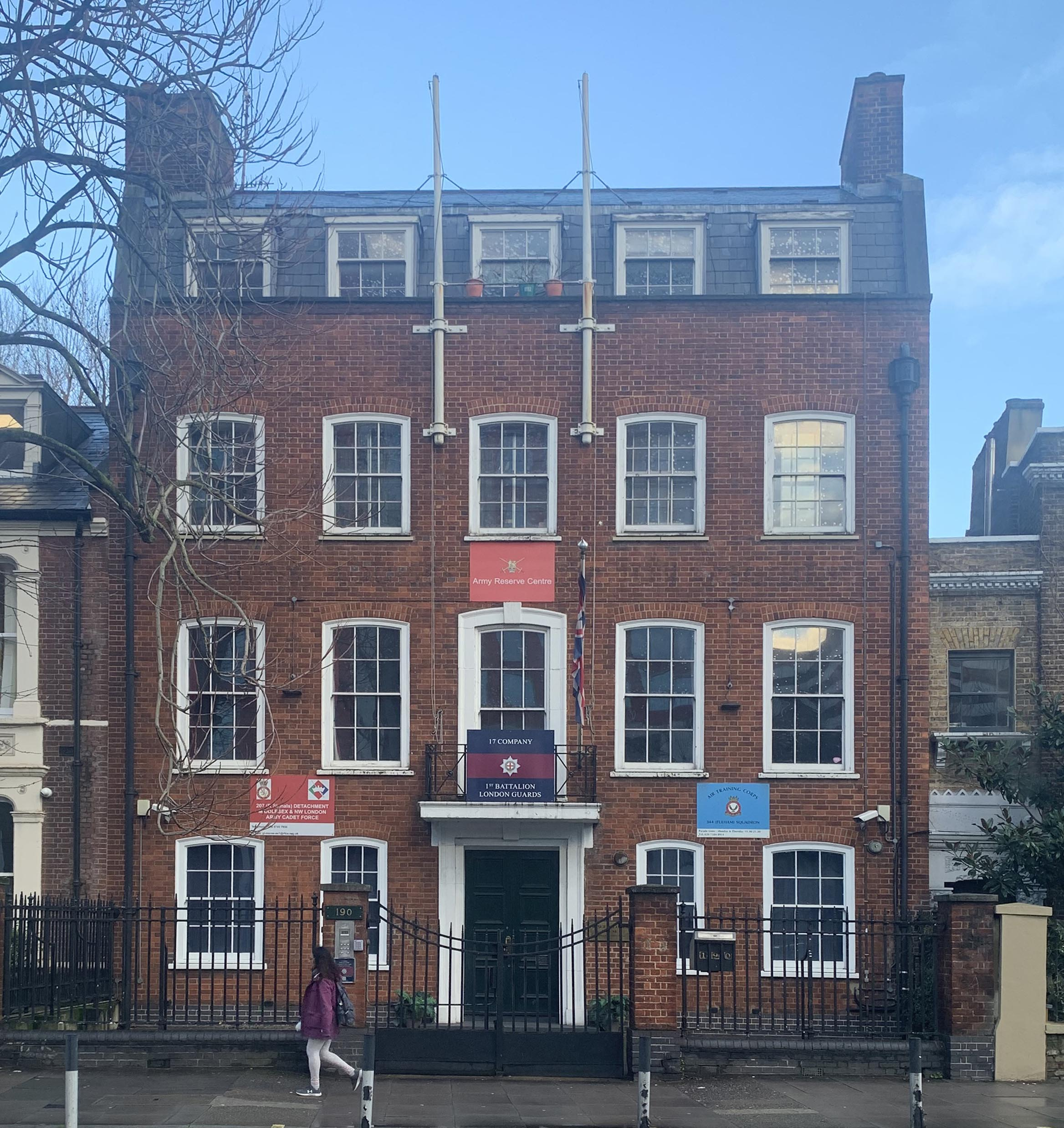
17 Company Coldstream Guards Building, Hammersmith

Whilst it existed, the London Regiment fell after the Parachute Regiment in precedence.

Preceded by 4th Battalion, Parachute Regiment	Army Reserve Order of Precedence	Succeeded by 6 Bn The Rifles
