= Scots Guards =

Infantry regiment of the British Army

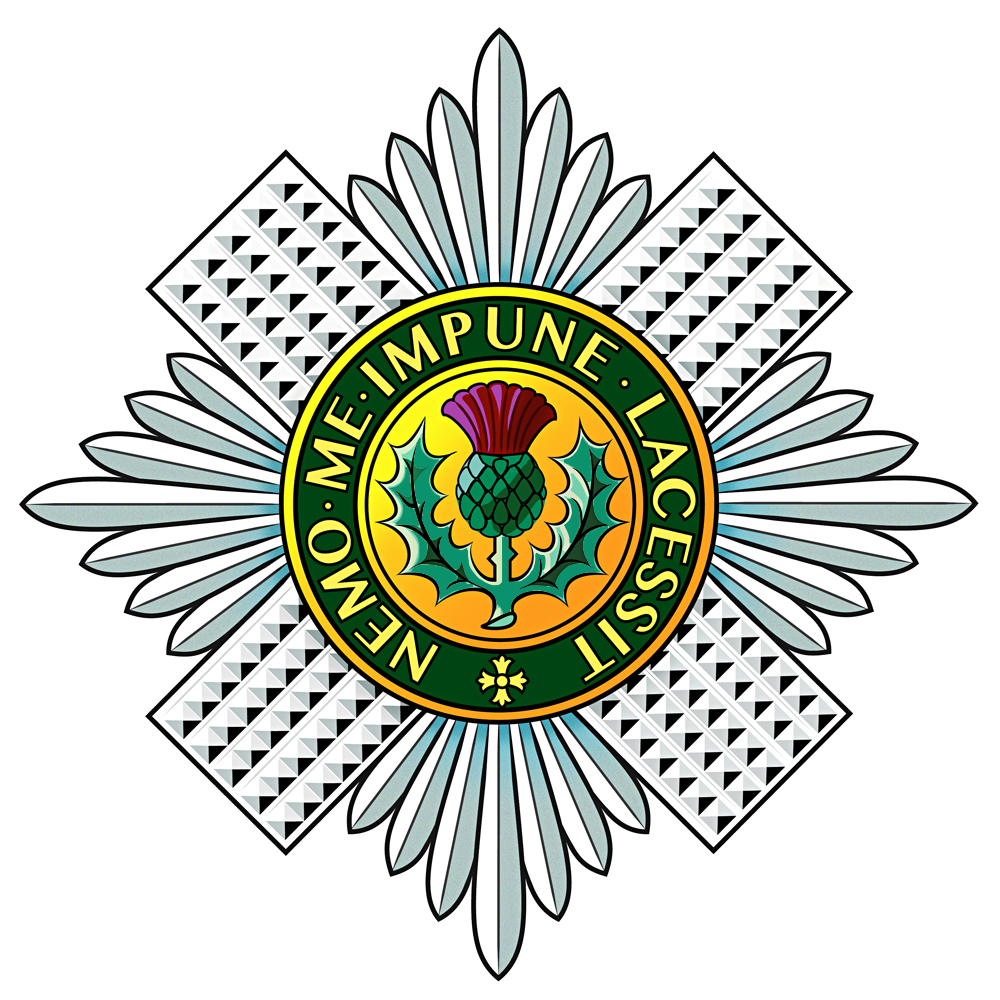
- Regimental badge of the Scots Guards (Note: The breast star of the Order of the Thistle.)
- Active: 1642–1651; 1662–present
- Country: Kingdom of Scotland (1642–1651) (1662–1686); Kingdom of England (1686–1707); Kingdom of Great Britain (1707–1801); United Kingdom (1801–present)
- Branch: British Army
- Type: Foot Guards
- Role: 1st Battalion Scots Guards – Mechanized Infantry; F Company – Public Duties
- Size: One battalion – 707 personnel One company One reserve company
- Part of: Guards and Parachute Division
- Garrison/HQ: RHQ – London; 1st Battalion – Catterick; F Company – London; G (Messines) Company – Army Reserve, London
- Nicknames: The Kiddies; Jock Guards
- Mottos: "Nemo Me Impune Lacessit" (Latin) "No one assails me with impunity"
- March: Quick – "Hielan' Laddie"; Slow – "The Garb of Old Gaul"
- Anniversaries: Saint Andrew's Day; 30 November; Battle of Mount Tumbledown; 13 June

Commanders
- Colonel-in-Chief: King Charles III
- Colonel of the Regiment: Prince Edward, Duke of Edinburgh

Insignia
- Tactical Recognition Flash
- Tartan: Royal Stewart
- Plume: none
- Abbreviation: SG

The Scots Guards (SG) is the regiment of Foot Guards of Scotland, and one of the five foot guard regiments of the British Army. Its origins are as the personal bodyguard of King Charles I of England and Scotland. Its lineage can be traced back to 1642 in the Kingdom of Scotland, although it was only placed on the English Establishment in 1686.

Scots Guards Full Dress

== History ==
=== Formation; 17th century ===
The regiment now known as the Scots Guards traces its origins to the Marquis of Argyll's Royal Regiment, a unit raised in 1642 by Archibald Campbell, 1st Marquess of Argyll in response to the 1641 Irish Rebellion. After the Restoration of Charles II, the Earl of Linlithgow received a commission dated 23 November 1660 to raise a regiment which was called The Scottish Regiment of Footguards.

It served in the 1679 Covenanter rising of 1679, as well as Argyll's Rising in June 1685, after which it was expanded to two battalions. When the Nine Years War began in 1689, the first battalion was sent to Flanders; the second served in Ireland, and fought at the 1690 Battle of the Boyne, before joining the First in 1691. The combined unit fought at Steenkerque and Landen, as well as the 1695 Namur. After the Treaty of Ryswick in 1697, the regiment returned to Scotland.

=== 18th century ===
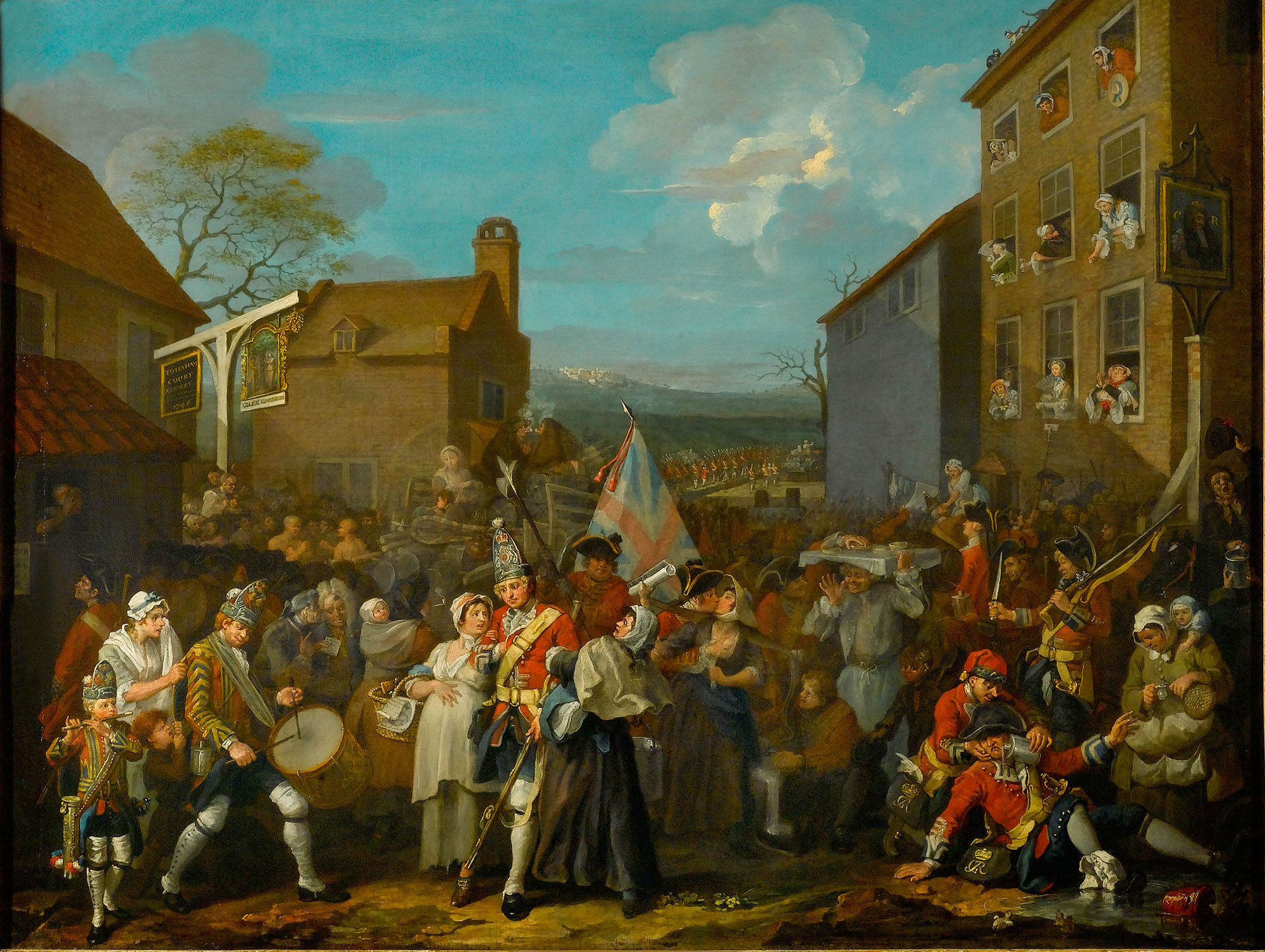
The March of the Guards to Finchley by William Hogarth; defending London during the Jacobite rising of 1745

The Guards remained in Scotland during the War of the Spanish Succession; retitled The Third Regiment of Foot Guards, it moved to London in 1712, and did not return to Scotland for another 100 years. During the 1740-1748 War of the Austrian Succession, the First Battalion served at Dettingen in 1743 and Fontenoy in April 1745, a British defeat famous for the Gardes françaises and Grenadier Guards inviting each other to fire first.

Both battalions were in London during the 1745 Rising; an engraving by William Hogarth shows them marching to take up defensive positions in North London. However, the Jacobite army turned back at Derby, and in July 1747, the Second Battalion was sent to Flanders, where it fought at Lauffeld, before the war ended with the Treaty of Aix-la-Chapelle.

In the absence of a modern police force, the military was often used for crowd control; in Memoirs of a Georgian Rake, William Hickey describes a detachment from the "Third Regiment of Guards, principally Scotchmen" dispersing a crowd attempting to release the radical politician, John Wilkes from prison in 1768.

=== 1805–1913 ===
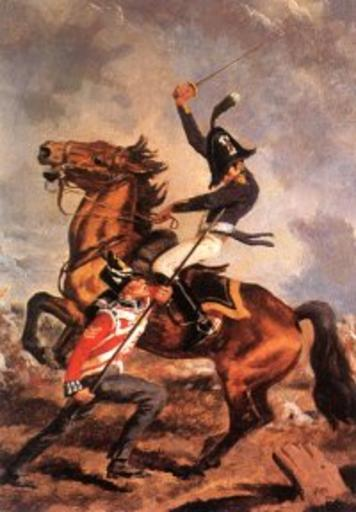
Scots Guard Sergeant A. Fraser unhorsing Col. Cuieres at Hougoumont Farm, June 1815

In April 1809, the 1st Battalion was sent to the Iberian Peninsula, and served in the Peninsular War in Portugal and Spain. It took part in the crossing of the River Douro on 12 May, an operation that ended so successfully that the French Army were in full retreat to Amarante after the actions in Oporto and its surrounding areas. In late July 1809 the regiment took part in the Battle of Talavera, one of the bloodiest and most bitter of engagements during the war.

The 2nd Battalion's flank companies took part in the disastrous Walcheren Campaign in the Low Countries. The 1st Battalion went on to take part in the Battle of Fuentes de Oñoro in May 1811, the Battle of Salamanca in July 1812, the Siege of San Sebastián in Summer 1813 and the Battle of the Nive in December 1813.

At the Battle of Waterloo in June 1815, the Scots Guards were positioned on the ridge just behind Hougoumont. Their light companies, commanded by Lieutenant-Colonel James Macdonnell, held Hougoumont Farm throughout the battle, a key defensive position on the right flank of the Allied army.

Scots Guards drummer, piper, bugler and musician, circa 1891

=== 1914–1945 ===
==== First World War ====
The 1st Battalion, part of the 1st (Guards) Brigade of the 1st Division, was part of the British Expeditionary Force which arrived in France in 1914. The Battalion took part in the Battle of Mons in August 1914, the First Battle of the Marne in September 1914 and the Battle of the Aisne also in September 1914. The 1st and 2nd Battalions then took part in the First Battle of Ypres in November 1914, the Battle of Aubers Ridge in May 1915 and the Battle of Loos in September 1915. In July 1916 the Scots Guards took part in the first Battle of the Somme and in July 1917, the regiment began its involvement in the Battle of Passchendaele. In March 1918 they fought at the second Battle of the Somme and in Autumn the regiment took part in the final battles of the war on the Western Front.

==== Second World War ====
In April 1940, the 1st Battalion, as part of the 24th Guards Brigade, took part in its first campaign of the war, during the expedition to Norway.

In North Africa, as part of the 22nd Guards Brigade, the 2nd Battalion took part in fighting against the Italians in Egypt followed by tough fighting in Libya, then also controlled by Italy. In North Africa, in March 1943, the 2nd Battalion took part in the defensive Battle of Medenine, after the Germans had counter-attacked the Allies.

In September 1943, the 2nd Battalion, as part of the 201st Guards Brigade of the 56th (London) Division, took part in the Landing at Salerno. In December 1943, the 1st Battalion, as part of 24th Guards Brigade, arrived in the Italian Theatre. At the Battle of Monte Cassino in early 1944, the 2nd Battalion suffered heavy casualties in tough fighting.

The 1st Battalion, as part of its brigade, joined the 6th South African Armoured Division in May 1944. The regiment took part in many fierce engagements throughout 1944, including those against the Gothic Line, a formidable defensive line.

=== Since 1948 and Batang Kali massacre ===
In the years following the Second World War the Scots Guards saw action in a number of Britain's colonial wars. In 1948, the 2nd Battalion of the Scots Guards was deployed to Malaya (now part of Malaysia) to crush a Communist-inspired and pro-independence uprising during a conflict known as the Malayan Emergency.

The battalion was involved in an incident known as the Batang Kali massacre, in which they were responsible for the execution of 24 unarmed civilians. By the time the battalion left Malaya in 1951 and returned home, it had lost thirteen soldiers.

By late 1951, the 1st Battalion was deployed to Cyprus; and in February 1952, the battalion deployed to the Suez Canal Zone, Egypt. In February 1962, the 2nd Battalion arrived in Kenya, and operated in support of the civil power during the Mau Mau Uprising. In 1965 the 1st Battalion undertook two tours in Borneo during the Indonesian Confrontation.

=== Post East of Suez withdrawal ===
Both the 1st and 2nd Battalion deployed to Northern Ireland during the Troubles in the early 1970s. In 1992, during their time in Northern Ireland, the Scots Guards were involved in the contentious shooting of civilian Peter McBride: two soldiers were convicted of murder.

During the Falklands War in 1982 the main force of the Scots Guards began its advance on the western side of Mount Tumbledown. During the course of the battle in the early hours of 14 June 1982, men of the 2nd Battalion wearing berets instead of helmets (to help distinguish each other from enemy soldiers in the dark) launched a bayonet charge on the redoubtable Argentinian defenders, which resulted in bitter and bloody fighting, and was one of the last bayonet charges by the British Army.

On the early morning of 1 November 1983, while stationed in British Hong Kong, two members of 1st Battalion C Company of the Scots Guards (William Downs from Glasgow and Malcolm Chambers from Omagh) absconded from their post guarding the border at Man Kam To Control Point after a drinking binge and went on a six hour rampage throughout the colony. The pair, who had stolen their patrol's Army Land Rover, were witnessed hijacking several civilian vehicles and exchanging gunfire with Royal Hong Kong Police officers after stopping for drinks in Wan Chai. They eventually arrived at Kai Tak airport where two airport police officers were disarmed and taken hostage, then wandered through the evacuated departures hall firing shots at random. Downs and Chambers eventually surrendered at 7:45am, and were later sentenced to imprisonment of four years and three years respectively.

In 2004, the 1st Battalion deployed to Iraq on a 6-month posting as part of 4th Armoured Brigade. The 4th Brigade relieved the 1st Mechanised Brigade, and joined the Multi-National Division (South East) that was under British command.

In 2021, the 1st Battalion moved to Somme Barracks, Catterick Garrison as part of the Army 2020 Refine reforms.

On 1 May 2022 (delayed from the originally intended 1 April 2022), soldiers in A (The London Scottish) Company, the London Regiment transferred to foot guards regiments and the company became G (Messines) Company, Scots Guards, 1st Battalion London Guards.

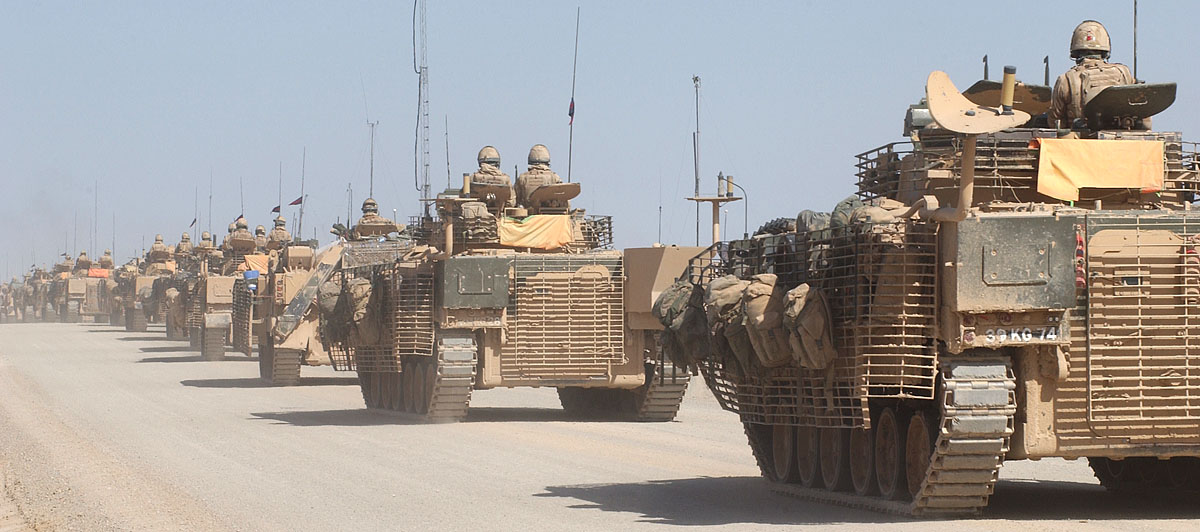
Warrior Infantry Fighting Vehicles of the Scots Guards patrolling in Helmand Province, Afghanistan, in 2008

== Traditions and affiliations ==
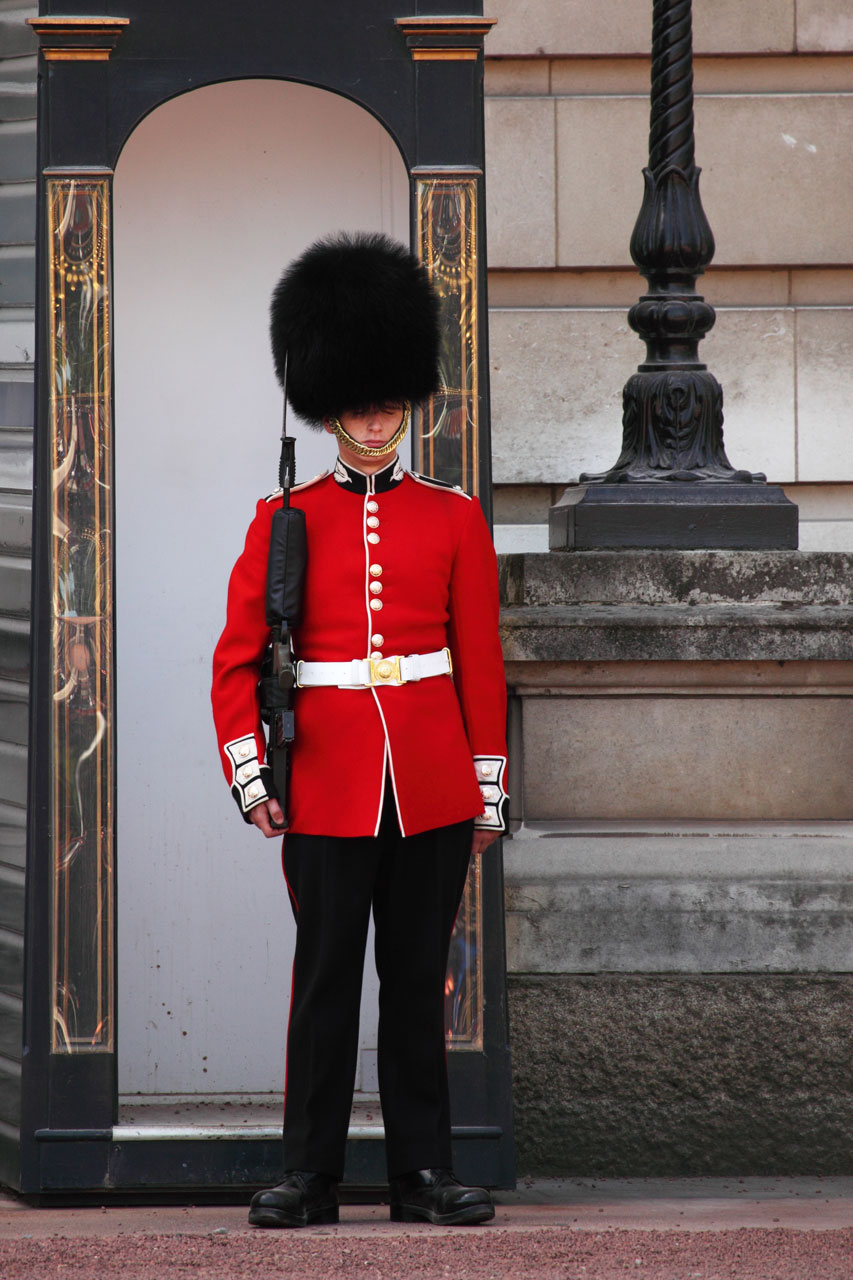
A Scots Guards sentry at Buckingham Palace

The Scots Guards and other Guards regiments have a long-standing connection to the Parachute Regiment. Guardsmen who have completed the P company selection course are transferred into the Guards Parachute Platoon, which is part of 3rd Battalion, Parachute Regiment. This continues the lineage of the No. 1 (Guards) Independent Parachute Company, who were the original Pathfinder Group of the 16th Parachute Brigade.

The Scots Guards is ranked as the third regiment in the Guards Division. As such, Scots Guardsmen can be recognized by having the buttons on their tunics spaced in threes. They also do not wear hackles (plumes) in their bearskins, unlike the other Foot Guards.

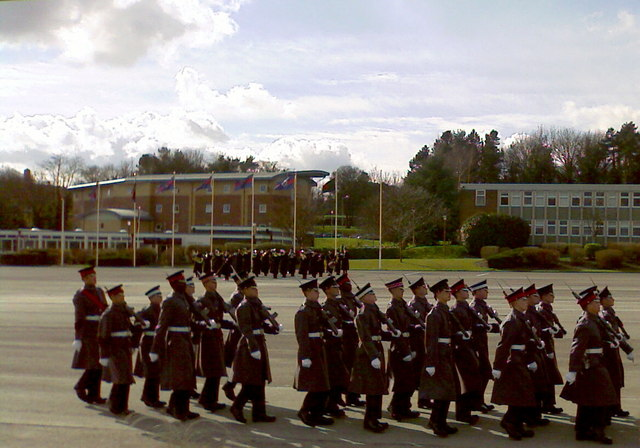
Modern-day recruits practising drill at Catterick

== Structure and role ==
Since 1993, F Company, permanently based in Wellington Barracks, London on public duties, has been the custodian of the colours and traditions of the 2nd Battalion, which was placed in permanent suspended animation in 1993 as a result of Options for Change. F Company was formerly part of the 2nd Bn as its 'support weapons company', operating mortars, anti-tank weapons, and reconnaissance vehicles.

The regiment consists of a single operational battalion, which was based in Catterick between 2008 and 2015, thereafter moving to Aldershot in the armoured infantry role. 1st Battalion will be equipped with Mastiff Vehicles (and later the Mechanised Infantry Vehicle (MIV)) under Army 2020 Refine and be under the first Strike Brigade. The 1st Battalion will not rotate public ceremonial duties unlike the other guards regiments with F Company performing that role.

Following the Integrated Review A (London Scottish) Company of the London Regiment at Rochester Row, Westminster became G (Messines) Company, Scots Guards.

== Training ==
Regular Recruits to the Guards Division go through a thirty-week training programme at the Infantry Training Centre (ITC). The training is two weeks more than the training for the Regular line infantry regiments of the British Army; the extra training, carried out throughout the course, is devoted to drill and ceremonies.

== Colonels-in-Chief ==
King Edward VII assumed the colonelcy-in-chief of the regiment on his accession, and subsequent monarchs have also been colonel-in-chief.

- 1901–1910: King Edward VII
- 1915–1936: King George V
- January 1936 – December 1936: King Edward VIII
- 1936–1952: King George VI
- 1952–2022: Queen Elizabeth II
- 2022–present: King Charles III

== Regimental colonels ==
Regimental Colonels have included:

- 1664–1684: Major General George Livingston, 3rd Earl of Linlithgow
- 1684–1691: Lieutenant General James Douglas
- 1691–1705: Lieutenant General George Ramsay
- 1707–1713: Lieutenant General William Kerr, 2nd Marquess of Lothian
- 1713–1752: General John Murray, 2nd Earl of Dunmore
- 1752–1767: General John Leslie, 10th Earl of Rothes
- 1767–1770: Field Marshal Prince William Henry, Duke of Gloucester and Edinburgh
- 1770–1782: General John Campbell, 4th Earl of Loudoun
- 1782–1806: Field Marshal John Campbell, 5th Duke of Argyll
- 1806–1834: Field Marshal Prince William Frederick, Duke of Gloucester and Edinburgh
- 1834–1836: General George Gordon, 5th Duke of Gordon
- 1836–1842: General George Ludlow, 3rd Earl Ludlow
- 1842–1852: Field Marshal Prince Albert of Saxe-Coburg and Gotha
- 1852–1861: Field Marshal Prince George, Duke of Cambridge
- 1861–1870: Field Marshal Sir Alexander Woodford
- 1870–1875: General Sir John Aitchison
- 1875–1883: General Henry Robinson-Montagu, 6th Baron Rokeby
- May 1883–June 1883: General Sir William Knollys
- 1883–1904: Field Marshal Prince Arthur, Duke of Connaught and Strathearn
- 1904–1932: Field Marshal Paul Methuen, 3rd Baron Methuen
- 1932–1936: Field Marshal Prince Albert, Duke of York
- 1937–1974: Field Marshal Prince Henry, Duke of Gloucester
- 1974–2024: Field Marshal Prince Edward, Duke of Kent
- 2024–present: Prince Edward, Duke of Edinburgh

== Regimental lieutenant colonels ==
For many years a colonel was given the full-time appointment of Lieutenant Colonel Commanding the regiment. After 1986 a lieutenant colonel was appointed, but in 1989 the role was retitled Regimental Lieutenant Colonel; this was an honorary appointment, filled by a senior serving officer who took on responsibility for the 'regimental affairs' of the regiment alongside his primary military role.

The Regimental Lieutenant Colonels have included:

- 1662–1664: The Earl of Linlithgow
- 1664–1666: vacant
- 1666–1667: Sir James Turner
- 1667–1677: The Earl of Kellie
- 1677–1682: The Lord Ross
- 1682–1687: John Winram
- 1687–1688: James Murray
- 1688–1689: The Viscount of Frendraught
- 1689–1694: James Maitland
- 1694–1695: George McGill
- 1695–1697: Robert Murray
- 1697–1704: George Macartney
- 1704–1710: Brig. Gen. The Earl of Dalhousie
- 1710–1717: Brig. Gen. John Stewart
- 1717–1723: Brig. Gen. Lord William Hay
- 1723–1743: Maj. Gen. James Scott
- 1743–1743: Col. Henry Skelton
- 1743–1744: Col. George Byng
- 1744– : Col. Rowland Reynolds
- 1747– : Col. James Stuart
- 1752–1756: Col. William Kingsley
- 1756–1758: Col. John Laurie
- 1758–1761: Maj. Gen. Andrew Robinson
- 1761–1768: Maj. Gen. John Gore
- 1768–1769: Col. Bernard Hale
- 1769–1770: Col. William Whitshed
- 1770–1775: Col. Michael Hudson
- 1775–1777: Col. Daniel Jones
- 1777–1782: Maj. Gen. William Wynyard
- 1782–1786: Maj. Gen. Sir George Osborn
- 1786–1791: Maj. Gen. Humphrey Stevens
- 1791–1793: Maj. Gen. Gustavus Guydickens
- 1793–1795: Maj. Gen. William Grinfield
- 1795–1802: Lt. Gen. Cavendish Lister
- 1802–1806: Lt. Gen. Napier Christie Burton
- 1806–1814: Lt. Gen. George Milner
- 1814–1821: Col. George Hill
- 1821–1825: Col. Henry Willoughby Rooke
- 1825–1830: Col. John Clitherow
- 1830–1836: Col. William Augustus Keate
- 1836–1837: Col. Edward Bowater
- 1837–1837: Col. Douglas Mercer
- 1837–1841: Col. John Aitchison
- 1841–1844: Col. William Henry Scott
- 1844–1850: Col. Berkeley Drummond
- 1850–1853: Col. William Thomas Knollys
- 1853–1854: Col. Henry Robert Colville
- 1854–1854: Col. The Lord Rokeby
- 1854–1858: Col. George Moncrieff
- 1858–1859: Col. Edward Walter Forestier-Walker
- 1859–1863: Col. William John Ridley
- 1863–1863: Col. Francis Seymour
- 1863–1864: Col. John Hamilton Elphinstone Dalrymple
- 1864–1868: Col. Sir Henry Percival de Bathe
- 1868–1874: Col. Frederick Arthur Charles Stephenson
- 1874–1874: Col. Henry Poole Hepburn
- 1874–1877: Col. The Lord Abinger
- 1877–1881: Col. Reginald Gipps
- 1881–1886: Col. George Hay Moncrieff
- 1886–1891: Col. Henry H. D. Stracey
- 1891–1895: Col. William Julius Gascoigne
- 1895–1898: Col. Barrington B. D. Campbell
- 1898–1903: Col. Henry Fludyer
- 1903–1905: Col. Inigo Richmund Jones
- 1905–1909: Col. Frederick W. Romilly
- 1909–1913: Col. Gerald J. Cuthbert
- 1913–1914: Col. Frederick James Heyworth
- 1914–1916: Col. Henry Fludyer
- 1916–1919: Col. James W. Smith-Neill
- 1919–1920: Col. Lord E. C. Gordon-Lennox
- 1920–1923: Col. A. B. E. Cator
- 1923–1927: Col. G. C. B. Paynter
- 1927–1931: Col. F. G. Alston
- 1931–1934: Col. E. C. T. Warner
- 1934–1938: Brig. E. W. S. Balfour
- 1938–1939: Col. W. P. A. Bradshaw
- 1939– : Col. E. W. S. Balfour

...

- 1959–1962: Col. The Earl Cathcart
- 1962–1964: Col. Adrian J. C. Seymour
- 1964–1967: Col. George P. M. Ramsay
- 1967–1970: Col. Archibald I. D. Fletcher
- 1970–1971: Col. John Swinton
- 1971–1974: Col. Sir Gregor MacGregor, 6th Baronet
- 1974–1978: Col. Murray P. de Klee
- 1978–1981: Col. Iain A. Ferguson
- 1981–1985: Col. James A. Dunsmure
- 1985–1987: Col. John M. Clavering
- 1987–1989: Lt. Col. Michael G. L. Whiteley
- 1989–1993: Brig. Michael I. E. Scott
- 1993–1995: Brig. Antony G. Ross
- 1995–2001: Maj. Gen. John P. Kiszely
- 2001–2006: Maj. Gen. John T. Holmes
- 2006–2011: Col. Alastair D. Mathewson
- 2011–2020: Brig. G. Harry F. S. Nickerson
- 2020–2021: Maj. Gen. Chris J. Bell
- 2021–present: Brig. James D. L. Leask. MBE

== Battle honours ==
The battle honours of the Scots Guards are as follows:

- Pre-First World War: Namur 1695, Dettingen, Lincelles, Egypt, Talavera, Barrosa, Fuentes de Oñoro, Salamanca, Nive, Peninsula, Waterloo, Alma, Inkerman, Sevastopol, Tel-er-Kebir, Egypt 1882, Suakin 1885, Modder River, South Africa 1899–1902
- First World War:
  - Western Front: Retreat from Mons, Marne 1914, Aisne 1914, Ypres 1914 1917, Langemarck 1914, Gheluvelt, Nonne Bosschen, Givenchy 1914, Neuve Chapelle, Aubers, Festubert 1915, Loos, Somme 1916 1918, Flers–Courcelette, Morval, Pilckem, Poelcapelle, Cambrai 1917 1918, St. Quentin, Albert 1918, Bapaume 1918, Arras 1918, Drocourt-Quéant, Hindenburg Line, Havrincourt, Canal du Nord, Selle, Sambre, France and Flanders 1914–18
- Second World War:
  - North-West Europe: Stien, Norway 1940, Quarry Hill, Estry, Venlo Pocket, Rhineland, Reichswald, Kleve, Moyland, Hochwald, Rhine, Lingen, Uelzen, North-West Europe 1944–45
  - North Africa: Halfaya 1941, Sidi Suleiman, Tobruk 1941, Gazala, Knightsbridge, Defence of Alamein Line, Medenine, Tadjera Khir, Medjez Plain, Grich el Oued, Djebel Bou Aoukaz 1943 I, North Africa 1941–43
  - Italy: Salerno, Battipaglia, Volturno Crossing, Rocchetta e Croce, Monte Camino, Campoleone, Carroceto, Trasimene Line, Advance to Florence, Monte San Michele, Catarelto Ridge, Argenta Gap, Italy 1943–45
- Post World War II: Tumbledown Mountain (Falkland Islands 1982), Gulf 1991

== Alliances ==
- Australia – 3rd Battalion, Royal Australian Regiment
- Royal Navy – HMS Duncan

== Freedom of entry ==
- Wantage granted on 2 August 2010

== Order of precedence ==
Preceded by Coldstream Guards	Infantry order of precedence	Succeeded by Irish Guards

== See also ==
- Armed forces in Scotland
- Military history of Scotland
- 1st Scots Guards F.C.
- 2nd Scots Guards F.C.

== Sources ==
- Cannon, Richard (1842). Historical Record of the Eighty-Sixth, or the Royal County Down Regiment of Foot. London: J. W. Parker.
- Dalton, Charles (1896). English Army Lists and Commission Registers, 1661-1714, Vol. IV (2018 ed.). London: Forgotten Books. ISBN 978-1333543266.
- Folker, Martin. "3rd Foot Guards (Or Scotch Guards)". War of the Spanish succession. Archived from the original on 15 September 2020.
- Hickey, William (1995). Memoirs of a Georgian Rake. The Folio Society.
- Longford, Elizabeth (1971). Wellington; The years of the sword. HarperCollins Publishers Ltd. ISBN 978-0586035481.
- McKinnon, Daniel (1883). Origins and Services of the Coldstream Guards, Volume I. Richard Bentley.
- "Scots Guards History". Scots Guards Association.
