= Allan Mallinson =

English author and retired British Army officer

Brigadier Allan Lawrence Mallinson
- Born: 6 February 1949 (age 77); Yorkshire
- Citizenship: British
- Education: St Chad's College in Durham
- Occupations: British Army officer (retired), novelist
- Writing career
- Genres: Historical novels, military history
- Notable work: Hervey series

Brigadier Allan Lawrence Mallinson (born 6 February 1949) is an English author and retired British Army officer.

Mallinson is best known for writing a series of novels chronicling the (fictional) life of Matthew Hervey, an officer serving in the (fictional) British 6th Light Dragoons from the late Napoleonic Wars through subsequent colonial conflicts in India, North America and South Africa.

== Early life ==
Mallinson was born on 6 February 1949 in Yorkshire, England, to Alfred and Edith Mallinson. From 1966, he trained for the Anglican priesthood at St Chad's College in Durham.

== Military career ==
Mallinson took a break from his theological studies to join the Army in 1969, joining the King's Own Royal Border Regiment as a Second Lieutenant on probation, and served with the infantry in Cyprus, Malaysia, Northern Ireland and Germany. He was confirmed as a Second Lieutenant in 1970, promoted to Lieutenant on 11 February 1971, and promoted to Captain on 11 August 1975, and acting Major on 1 September 1979..

He transferred to the 13th/18th Royal Hussars (Queen Mary's Own) on 28 October 1980, and was promoted to substantive major on 30 September 1981. He served in Whitehall, Norway, Cyprus and again in Germany. He was promoted to lieutenant colonel on 31 December 1988 (with seniority from 30 June 1988), commanding his regiment from 1988 to 1991. He was promoted to acting colonel on 1 December 1992, and to substantive rank on 30 June 1993 and then to brigadier on 1 September 1999.

His last Army appointment was as military attaché at the British Embassy, Rome. He retired from active service on 16 March 2004.

== Matthew Hervey series ==
Beginning as a cornet at Waterloo, Matthew Hervey of the 6th Light Dragoons, and son of the vicar of Horningsham finds himself in many of the colonial military actions thereafter, including Ireland, Canada, India, South Africa, Burma and the Balkans. His climb through the ranks is neither fast nor easy, as the son of a vicar does not have the private means to readily buy promotion. His romantic life is also more turbulent than might be expected of a vicar's son. Despite his personal trials he makes a very human effort to remain a man of honor, and the adversities he faces change him perceptibly as a character throughout the series. As the impressionable cornet is tried and tested his touchstone remains his fellow dragoons, to several of whom he becomes very close.

The series is highly detailed with regard to the daily operations of a cavalry regiment, campaigning and at barracks. Hervey's social life also demonstrates for the reader many of the customs and proprieties of English society in the early to mid 1800s. Also of note, unlike many books of either fiction or non-fiction, equestrian details related to tack, training, riding and equestrian health are specific and frequent. Much like the Patrick O'Brian character Stephen Maturin's medical practice, the various troop veterinary surgeons of the 6th Light Dragoons are often consulted and they give the reader some interesting insight into the evolution of veterinary practice. Hervey's familiarity with the subject contributes greatly to the sensation of being transported to the life of a cavalryman.

== Works ==
=== Fiction ===
In UK hardback publication order, the Hervey novels are:

1. A Close Run Thing (1999): Cornet Hervey's adventures before and during the Battle of Waterloo.
2. The Nizam's Daughters (2000): Hervey in India, defending the fictional princely state of Chintal (published in the US as Honourable Company).
3. A Regimental Affair (2001): problems in the regiment in England and Canada.
4. A Call to Arms (2002): back in India, an independent excursion on the borders of Burma.
5. The Sabre's Edge (2003): set in the First Burmese War in 1824, and the siege of Bharatpur in 1826.
6. Rumours of War (2004): Hervey in Portugal in 1826, with flashbacks to the Peninsular War before the battle of Corunna in 1809.
7. An Act of Courage (2005): Hervey imprisoned at Badajoz at Christmas 1826, with further flashbacks to the Battle of Talavera in 1809 and the Siege of Badajoz in 1812.
8. Company of Spears (2006): Hervey in the Cape Colony in 1827 fighting the Zulus, immediately before the death of Shaka and the accession of Dingane.
9. Man of War (2007): in 1827, Matthew Hervey is in England; unusually seeing no action. Meanwhile, in a parallel story line, his old friend Peto takes part in the Battle of Navarino.
10. Warrior (2008): 1828 – Hervey is tasked with escorting an embassy to Shaka, King of the Zulus, whose motives are under suspicion.
11. On His Majesty's Service (2011): Hervey is sent as an observer to the Russian army during their war with the Ottoman Empire in 1829.
12. Words of Command (2015): 1830 and Hervey is in Belgium during a time of unrest.
13. The Passage to India (2018): 1831 - Both in England and India unrest is evident. Domestically the strife is over the impending Reform Bill; whilst in India the problems are between the various princely states.
14. The Tigress of Mysore (2020): 1834 - Hervey is thought the right man to muster and lead a force to crush the threat posed by the 'thuggee'.

=== Non-fiction ===
- Light Dragoons (1993) – a non-fictional history of the four light cavalry regiments of the British Army. It was published in 1993, soon after he relinquished command of 13th/18th Royal Hussars (which includes (in merged form) two of the light dragoon regiments: the 13th was originally raised as a heavy dragoon regiment in 1715 but later converted to light dragoons; the 18th was raised as a light dragoon regiment in 1759; both retitled as hussars in 1861, merged in 1922 and then merged with the 15th/19th The King's Royal Hussars to form the present Light Dragoons in 1992).
- The Making of the British Army: From the English Civil War to the War On Terror (2009). The book examines nearly 500 years of the British Army and examines how its military actions has made it one of the most effective fighting forces in the world today. Mallinson demonstrates how people and events have shaped the army's development. Sections include: how Marlborough's victory at Blenheim is linked to Wellington's success at Waterloo; how the desperate fight at Rorke's Drift in 1879 underpinned the heroism of the airborne forces in Arnhem in 1944; and why Montgomery's momentous victory at El Alamein mattered long after the Second World War.
- 1914: Fight the Good Fight: Britain, the Army and the Coming of the First World War (2013) - In this major new history, one of Britain's foremost military historians and defence experts tackles the origins - and the opening first few weeks of fighting - of what would become known as 'the war to end all wars'. Intensely researched and convincingly argued, Allan Mallinson explores and explains the grand strategic shift that occurred in the century before the war, the British Army's regeneration after its drubbings in its fight against the Boer in South Africa, its almost calamitous experience of the first twenty days' fighting in Flanders to the point at which the British Expeditionary Force - the 'Old Contemptibles' - took up the pick and the spade in the middle of September 1914. For it was then that the war changed from one of rapid and brutal movement into the now familiar image of the trenches and the coming of the Territorials, Kitchener's 'Pals', and ultimately the conscripts - and of course the poets. And with them, that terrible sense of the pity and of the futility.
- Too Important for the Generals: Winning and Losing the First World War (2017). In this work Mallinson argues that recent defences of Field Marshal Sir Douglas Haig and other are mistaken - and that critics of the strategy and tactics of the First World War (such as Winston Churchill) were actually correct, but that the critics lacked the power to put their ideas into practice. For example, Winston Churchill could suggest alternative approaches - but he did not have the power to pick what commanders would carry out his ideas.
- The Shape of Battle: Six Campaigns from Hastings to Helmand (2022). A comparative study of military campaigns including Hastings (1066), Towton (1461), Waterloo (1815), D-Day (1944), the Imjin River (1951) and Operation Panther's Claw (2009).
