= Queen's Own Yorkshire Yeomanry =

- Active: 1956–1971 (Continues as A Sqn Queen's Own Yeomanry
- Country: United Kingdom
- Branch: British Army
- Type: Light Cavalry
- Role: Reconnaissance
- Size: Squadron
- Garrison/HQ: Fulford, York
- Nickname: QOYY
- Motto: Forrard
- Anniversaries: 23rd March - ERY's Crossing of the Rhine

Commanders
- Officer Commanding: Maj H Bell
- Honorary Colonel: Maj L S Foster, TD

The Queen's Own Yorkshire Yeomanry (QOYY) was a Yeomanry regiment of the British Army from 1956 to 1971. Its lineage is maintained today by A (Yorkshire Yeomanry) Squadron, Queen's Own Yeomanry.

== History ==
The regiment was formed by the amalgamation of three Yorkshire Yeomanry regiments, the Yorkshire Hussars, the Queen's Own Yorkshire Dragoons and the East Riding of Yorkshire Yeomanry in 1956. The regiment was equipped with Daimler Dingo armoured cars and Austin Champs, and later Ferrets and Land Rovers. In 1967, it was disbanded and immediately reconstituted as the Queen's Own Yorkshire Yeomanry (T), a TAVR III (Home Defence) infantry unit of the Territorial Army. It was reduced to a cadre in 1969, and became the Yorkshire Squadron, the Queen's Own Yeomanry in 1971.

During the 1970s the Yorkshire Squadron was equipped with Saladins, Saracens and Ferrets, later to be replaced by the Combat Vehicle Reconnaissance (Wheeled) and Combat Vehicle Reconnaissance (Tracked) series of vehicles and trained to provide rear area security for I British Corps. The unit then transitioned away from tracked vehicles and onto wheel based platformed, first with Land Rover RWMIK in 2003 and then onto Jackal (vehicle) in 2018 to perform the light armoured reconnaissance role.

== A (Yorkshire Yeomanry) Squadron, Queen's Own Yeomanry ==
=== Freedom of York ===
A (Yorkshire Yeomanry) Squadron was granted Freedom of the City of York on 3 December 2009.

To commemorate the 50th anniversary of the Queen's Own Yeomanry, A (Yorkshire Yeomanry) exercised the Freedom once again in April 2022.
