= 13th/18th Royal Hussars =

13th/18th Royal Hussars (Queen Mary's Own)
- Active: 9 November 1922 – 1 December 1992
- Country: United Kingdom
- Branch: British Army
- Type: Line Cavalry
- Role: Formation Reconnaissance
- Size: One regiment
- Part of: Royal Armoured Corps
- Garrison/HQ: Tower Street, York
- Mottos: Viret in aeternum ('May Their Name Flourish Forever'); Pro rege, Pro lege, Pro patria conamur ('For King, For Justice, for Country we fight')

Commanders
- Colonel-in-Chief: Diana, Princess of Wales

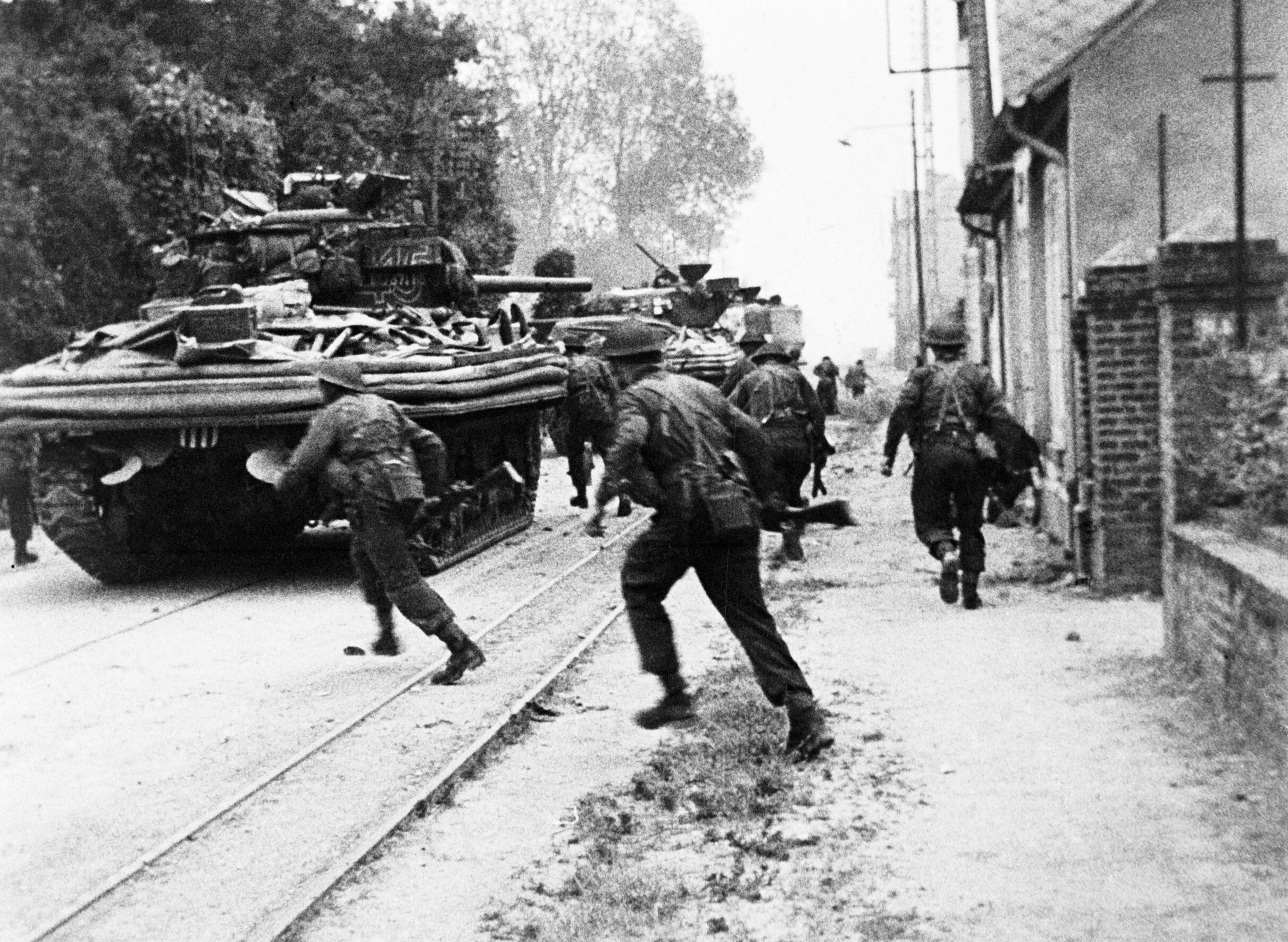
Amphibious DD Tanks of the 13th/18th Royal Hussars on D-Day; (note the folded flotation 'skirts' and twin propellers)

The 13th/18th Royal Hussars (Queen Mary's Own) was a cavalry regiment of the British Army. It was formed by the amalgamation of the 13th Hussars and the 18th Royal Hussars in 1922 and, after service in the Second World War, it amalgamated with the 15th/19th The King's Royal Hussars to form the Light Dragoons in 1992.

== History ==
=== Second World War ===
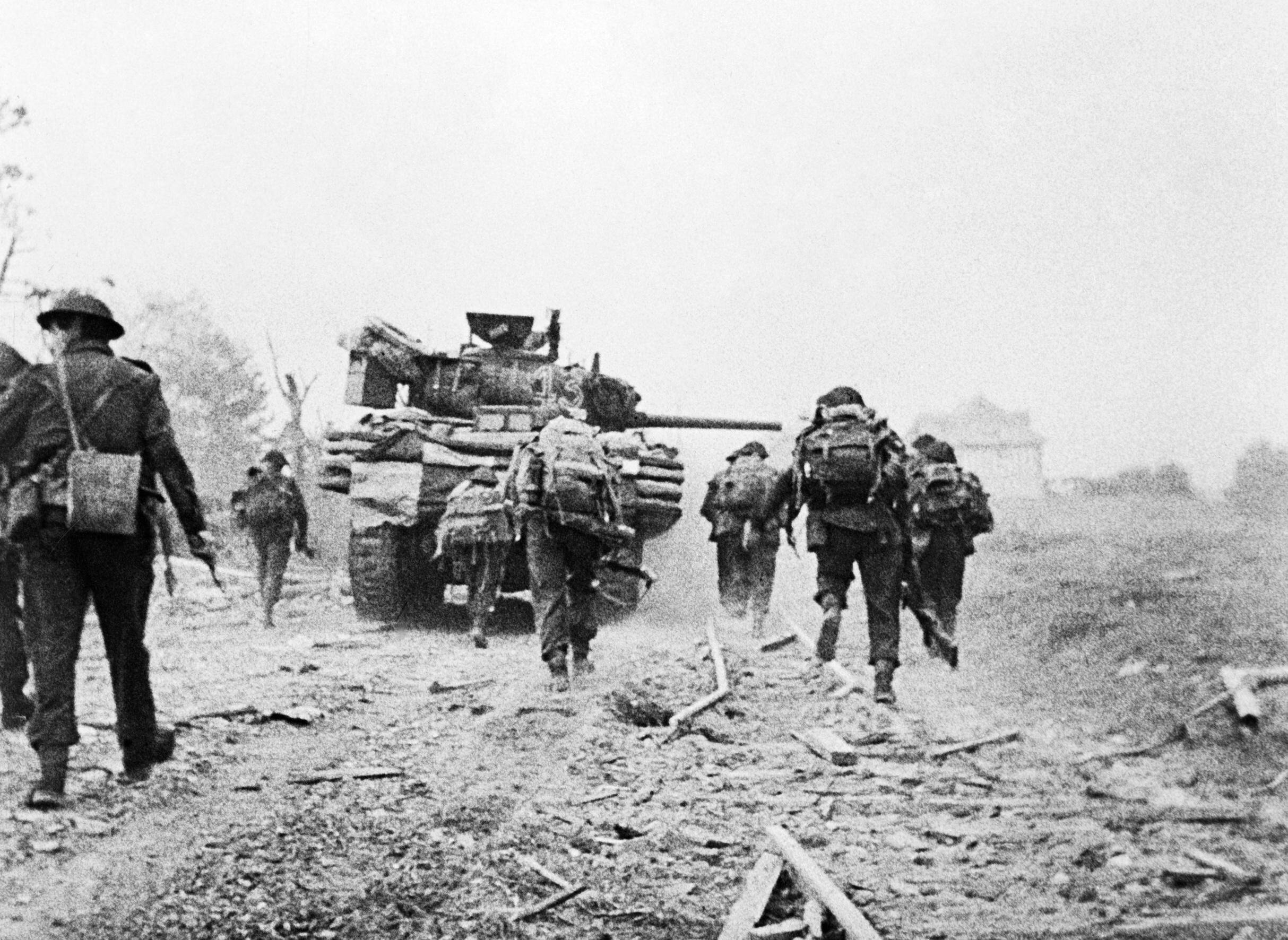
Tanks of the 13th/18th Royal Hussars advance with No. 4 Commando on D-Day

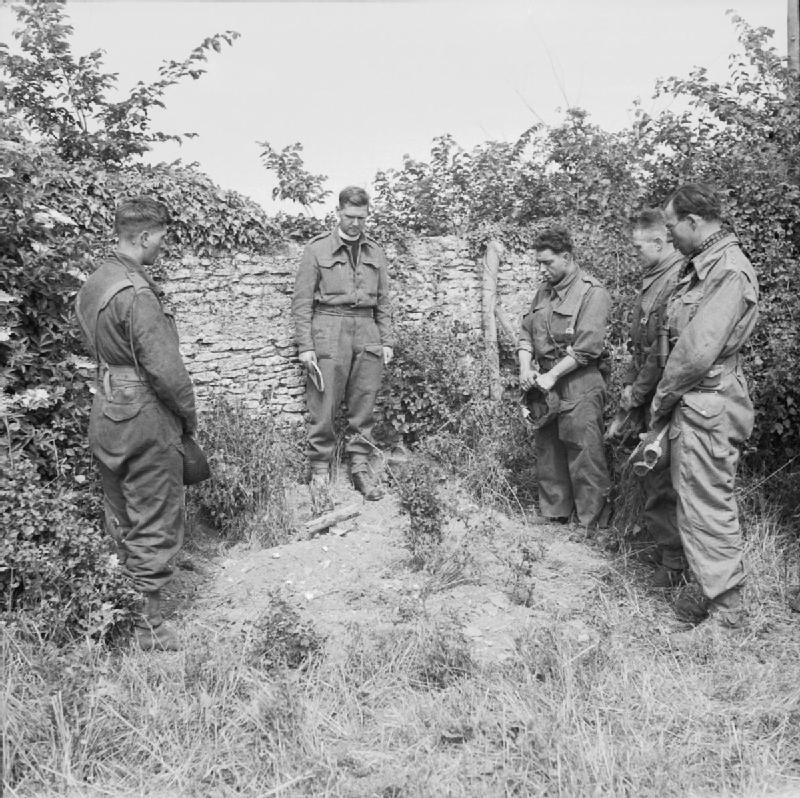
Operation Overlord (the Normandy Landings)- D-day 6 June 1944. Reverend Victor Leach, Padre of 13/18 Hussars, reading the burial service for a fallen tankman who was killed in action with the German 21st Panzer Division in the Hermanville-sur-Mer sector of Normandy, France. The dead man's comrades stand in silent tribute at the graveside.

The regiment was created, as part of the reduction in cavalry in the aftermath of the First World War, by the amalgamation of the 13th Hussars and the 18th Royal Hussars on 9 November 1922. It was renamed as the 13th/18th Royal Hussars (Queen Mary's Own) after Queen Mary, who was Colonel-in-Chief of the regiment, in December 1935. The regiment transferred to the Royal Armoured Corps in April 1939.

During the Second World War, the regiment served as a reconnaissance unit with the 1st Armoured Reconnaissance Brigade, part of 1st Infantry Division, during the Battle of France. It then served with the 27th Armoured Brigade. Having been equipped with Sherman DD tanks, it took part in the D-Day Landings at Sword Beach, and fought during Operation Overlord, taking part in the landings at Sword Beach, and continuing fighting with the 27th Armoured Brigade until late July 1944 when it transferred to the 8th Armoured Brigade.

=== Post-war ===
The regiment was posted to Northampton Barracks in Wolfenbüttel in March 1946 and returned to the United Kingdom to its new base at Willems Barracks in Aldershot Garrison in October 1947. It was deployed to Libya in February 1948, to Egypt in April 1950 and to Malaya, for service as an armoured car regiment during the Malayan Emergency, in June 1950. It returned to Wolfenbüttel in November 1953 and then moved to McLeod Barracks at Neumünster in April 1956 from where it deployed a squadron to Aden. It returned to Malaya and was posted to Ramillies Camp at Ipoh in July 1958.

The regiment joined 7th Armoured Brigade Group and moved to Wessex Barracks at Bad Fallingbostel in February 1961. It transferred to 4th Guards Brigade Group and relocated to Barker Barracks at Paderborn in February 1964 and then returned to the United Kingdom in a tank role at Cachy Barracks at Perham Down in December 1966; from there it continued to deploy troops to Aden. It returned to West Germany where it joined 4th Armoured Brigade and located to Swinton Barracks in Munster in January 1968. It became the garrisoned regiment at Long Kesh in January 1972, following the introduction of internment of Provisional Irish Republican Army suspects.

After this tour, the regiment moved to Bovington Camp as RAC Centre Regiment in August 1972 and then returned to West Germany where it rejoined 7th Armoured Brigade with its base at Caen Barracks in Hohne in August 1974. It was deployed to Lisanelly Camp in Omagh in November 1977 and then moved to Carver Barracks in Wimbish in May 1979; from there it deployed units to Cyprus on peace keeping duties.

The regiment was re-equipped with the Combat Vehicle Reconnaissance (Tracked) range of vehicles, together with the Swingfire Wire-guided missile, and relocated to Harewood Barracks in Herford becoming part of 1st British Corps in November 1982. From there it deployed a squadron on guarding duties at the Maze Prison in September 1985. The regiment returned to the United Kingdom and joined 1st Armoured Infantry Brigade with its new base at Assaye Barracks in Tidworth Camp in November 1986 from where it again deployed squadrons to Cyprus. It went back to Northampton Barracks in Wolfenbüttel as recce regiment for 1st Armoured Division in May 1991. The regiment amalgamated with the 15th/19th The King's Royal Hussars to form the Light Dragoons on 1 December 1992.

== Regimental museum ==
The regimental collection is held by the Discovery Museum in Newcastle upon Tyne.

== Battle honours ==
Combined battle honours of the 13th and 18th Hussars plus:

- The Second World War: Dyle, Withdrawal to Escaut, Ypres-Comines Canal, Normandy Landing, Bréville, Caen, Bourguébus Ridge, Mont Pinçon, St. Pierre La Vielle, Geilenkirchen, Roer, Rhineland, Waal Flats, Goch, Rhine, Bremen, North-West Europe 1940 '44–45.

== Commanding Officers ==
The Commanding Officers have been:

- 1959–1962: Lt.-Col. Douglas H.E. Coker
- 1962–1964: Lt.-Col. H. Stuart R. Watson
- 1964–1966: Lt.-Col. Philip B. Tillard
- 1966–1968: Lt.-Col. Roger S. Beresford
- 1968–1970: Lt.-Col. John R.L. Howard
- 1970–1973: Lt.-Col. John C.M. Ansell
- 1973–1976: Lt.-Col. David A.G. Edelsten
- 1976–1978: Lt.-Col. David J. St.J. Loftus
- 1978–1981: Lt.-Col. George McL. Stephen
- 1981–1983: Lt.-Col. Robert J.W. Ffrench-Blake
- 1983–1986: Lt.-Col. Roderick A. Cordy-Simpson
- 1986–1988: Lt.-Col. Edward L. Yorke
- 1988–1991: Lt.-Col. Allan L. Mallinson
- 1991–1992: Lt.-Col. Andrew R.E. de C. Stewart

== Colonels-in-Chief ==
- 1922: Queen Mary
- 1989: Diana, Princess of Wales

== Regimental Colonels ==
Colonels of the Regiment were:

- 1922–1938: Lt-Gen. The Lord Baden-Powell, OM, GCMG, GCVO, KCB (ex 13th Hussars)
- 1938–1942: Col. James Jardine Richardson, DSO
- 1942–1952: Brig. John Noel Lumley, CBE, MC
- 1952–1959: Maj-Gen. Charles Harvey Miller, CB, CBE, DSO
- 1959–1968: Col. Vincent Ashforth Blundell Dunkerly, DSO, JP
- 1968–1974: Col. John Roger Cordy-Simpson, CBE, MC
- 1974–1979: Maj-Gen. Derrick Bruce Wormald, DSO, MC
- 1979–1990: Maj-Gen. Henry Stuart Ramsay Watson, CBE
- 1990–1992: Col. Robert John William ffrench Blake (to Light Dragoons)
- 1992 Regiment amalgamated with 15th/19th The King's Royal Hussars to form The Light Dragoons
