= Angus Watson (British Army officer) =

British Army officer

- Born: 1 June 1967 (age 59); Leamington Spa, Warwickshire
- Military career
- Allegiance: United Kingdom
- Branch: British Army
- Service years: 1987–2019
- Rank: Brigadier
- Service number: 528380
- Unit: 13th/18th Royal Hussars
- Commands: Light Dragoons
- Conflicts: Kosovo War; Iraq War; War in Afghanistan
- Awards: Member of the Order of the British Empire; Queen's Commendation for Valuable Service
- Other work: Clerk to the Haberdashers' Co.

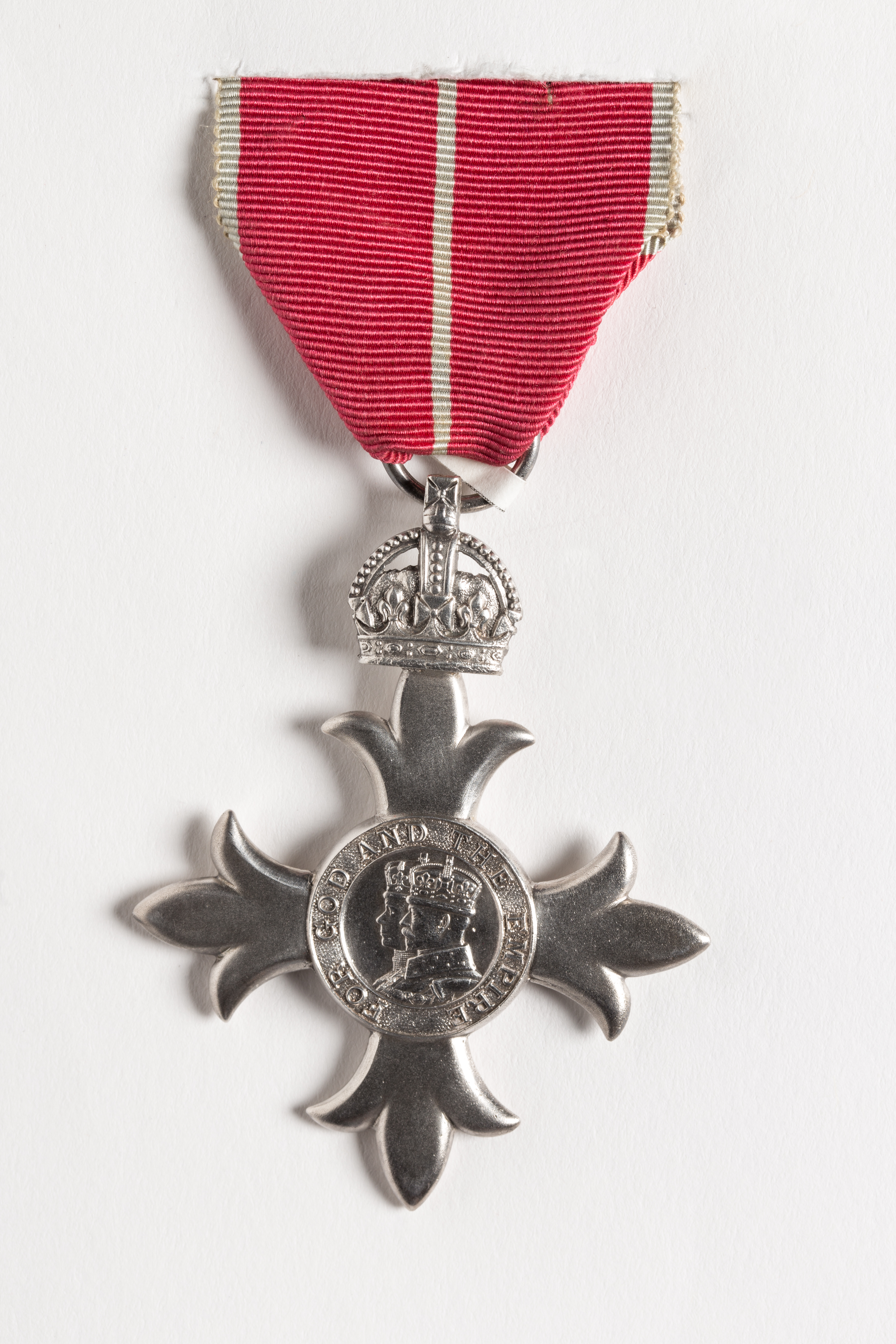
MBE insignia

Brigadier Henry Angus Watson MBE (born 1 June 1967), is a retired senior British Army officer and Clerk to the Haberdashers' Company since 2020.

== Early life and education ==
Of Scottish descent, he is the elder son of Major-General (Henry) Stuart Ramsay Watson CBE (1922–2022) by his wife, Susan née Jackson.

Educated at Winchester College, Watson went up to read Geography at the University of Newcastle (BA) and later pursued further studies at Cranfield University (MA).

== Career ==
Commissioned into his father's regiment, the 13th/18th Hussars, Watson saw action in Kosovo and Iraq, before serving in Afghanistan as commanding officer of the Light Dragoons from 2006 to 2009.

Appointed MBE in 2003, Watson was awarded the Queen's Commendation for Valuable Service on 7 March 2008 for meritorious service in Afghanistan.

He was Regimental Colonel of the Light Dragoons from 2020 to 2026, and serves as Clerk to the Haberdashers' Company in the City of London.

A member of Marylebone Cricket Club, Watson has played Army cricket as well as for I Zingari.

== Family ==
In 1998, Watson married Caroline Perkins, having one son and two daughters.

== See also ==
- Clan Watson
- Worshipful Company of Haberdashers

Military offices
Preceded by Major-General; David Rutherford-Jones	Regimental Colonel; Light Dragoons; 2020–present	Incumbent
