= Waterloo Barracks =

Waterloo Barracks may refer to:

- Waterloo Barracks, 1845 building in the Tower of London, renamed Waterloo Block
- Waterloo Barracks, part of the former British Osnabrück Garrison, Germany
