= 4th Light Brigade =

Brigade formation of the British Army

Heavy Armoured Brigade (Egypt) 4th Armoured Brigade 4th Armoured Brigade Group 4th Mechanized Brigade 4th Infantry Brigade and Headquarters North East 4th Light Brigade
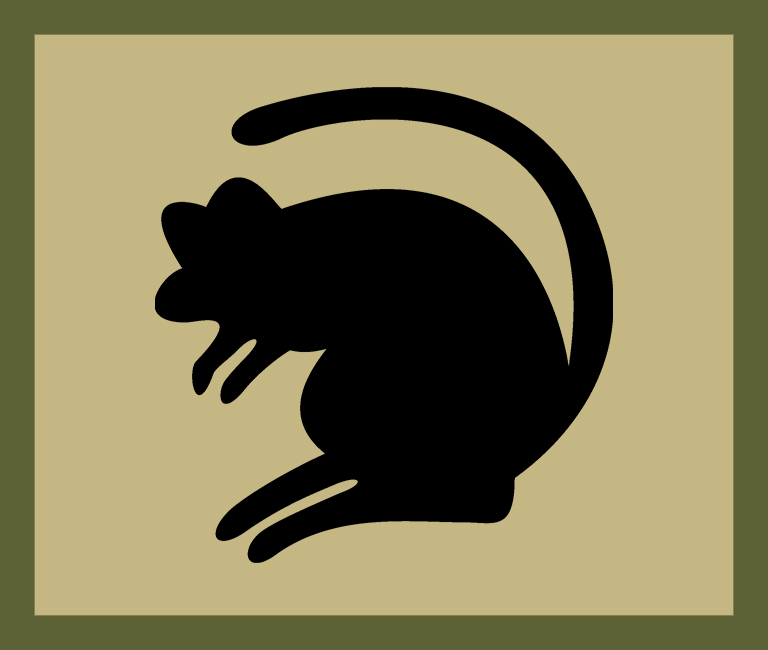
- Current insignia of the 4th Light Brigade
- Active: 1939–1945; 1976–Present
- Country: United Kingdom
- Branch: British Army
- Type: Infantry
- Size: Brigade
- Part of: 1st (United Kingdom) Division
- Garrison/HQ: Catterick, North Yorkshire
- Nickname: The Black Rats
- Engagements: Second World War North African Campaign Invasion of Sicily Battle of Normandy North West Europe Campaign Gulf War; Bosnian War; Kosovo Campaign; Iraq War; Afghanistan

Commanders
- Current commander: Brigadier O P B Dobson
- Notable commanders: Michael Carver

4th Light Brigade, is a brigade formation of the British Army, currently based in Catterick, North Yorkshire as part of 1st (United Kingdom) Division. It was previously known as 4th Infantry Brigade and Headquarters North East, and before that as 4th Mechanized Brigade and before that 4th Armoured Brigade.

The brigade, now known as the 'Black Rats', was formed in 1939 and fought in the Second World War, in the Western Desert Campaign and in North Africa. The Black Rats were subsequently involved in the invasion of Sicily and fighting in Italy before taking part in the Battle of Normandy and the advance through Belgium, Holland and into Germany. More recently, the brigade took part in the First Gulf War and completed a number of tours to the Balkans during the 1990s. The Black Rats also deployed twice to Iraq and twice to Afghanistan as the lead formation.

== History ==
=== Second World War ===
In September 1939, at the start of the Second World War this brigade changed its title from Heavy Armoured Brigade (Egypt) to 4th Armoured Brigade.

On 27 July 1941, it handed over its units to the 1st Army Tank Brigade and received new units based in Egypt. It was reformed again when the HQ arrived in Sicily and it took control of new units there. The 4th Armoured Brigade saw service in the North African Campaign, the Allied invasion of Sicily, the Italian Campaign and in North-western Europe. Although it served under many different formations it was most famous as part of the 7th Armoured Division, the "Desert Rats".

The 4th Armoured Brigade left the 7th Armoured Division in North Africa in 1943, to return to join the Allied invasion force for Normandy. In June 1944, the brigade landed in Normandy as an independent brigade and fought during the Battle of Normandy during the Battle for Caen.

The 4th Armoured Brigade then advanced into Belgium and Holland, and was the first to cross the Rhine into Germany.

The brigade was disestablished in 1948.

Former BBC motorsports commentator Murray Walker served with 4th Armoured Brigade during the Second World War as a member of The Royal Scots Greys. After the war he started a motorcycle club, organising trials and scrambles for the soldiers within the Brigade.

=== Cold War era ===
The brigade spent many years in Germany as part of the British Army of the Rhine. The brigade was one of two "square" brigades assigned to 2nd Division when it converted into an armoured formation in 1976. After being briefly converted to "Task Force Charlie" in the late 1970s, the brigade was reinstated in 1981, assigned to 3rd Armoured Division and was based at York Barracks in Münster. The Brigade deployed to the First Gulf War on Operation Granby in 1990/91 and was involved in the liberation of Kuwait. It moved to Quebec Barracks at Osnabrück in 1993 to replace 12th Armoured Brigade as part of 1st (UK) Armoured Division.

=== Post-Cold War ===
4th Armoured Brigade deployed to Bosnia in October 1995 as UNPROFOR HQ Sector South-West and subsequently as the leading UK element of the NATO Implementation Force (IFOR). The Black Rats have since deployed twice to Iraq and twice to Afghanistan, first on Operation Herrick 12 in 2010; and again in October 2012 for Operation Herrick 17, during which it was working in support of the Afghan Army's 3/215 Brigade and elements of the Afghan National Police.

=== 4th Infantry Brigade ===
Under Army 2020, the brigade lost its armour and converted to an infantry brigade. The structure of the brigade in 2020 was as follows:

- 4th Infantry Brigade, at Peronne Lines, Catterick Garrison
  - The Light Dragoons, at Gaza Barracks, Catterick Garrison (Light Cavalry, 66x Jackal armoured reconnaissance vehicles)
  - The Queen's Own Yeomanry (Army Reserve), at Fenham Barracks, Newcastle upon Tyne (Light Cavalry, 66x Jackal armoured reconnaissance vehicles)
  - The Royal Highland Fusiliers, 2nd Battalion, The Royal Regiment of Scotland, at Glencorse Barracks, Penicuik (Light Infantry)
  - 1st Battalion, The Duke of Lancaster's Regiment, at Dale Barracks, Chester (Light Infantry)
  - 2nd Battalion, Mercian Regiment, at Weeton Barracks, Blackpool (Light Infantry) – arriving back from Cyprus in November 2020
  - 1st Battalion, Grenadier Guards, at Lille Barracks, Aldershot Garrison (Light Infantry)
  - 52nd Lowland Volunteers, 6th Battalion, The Royal Regiment of Scotland (Army Reserve), at Walcheren Barracks, Glasgow (Light Infantry) – paired with 2nd Battalion, Royal Regiment of Scotland (2 SCOTS)
  - 4th Battalion, The Duke of Lancaster's Regiment (Army Reserve), at Kimberley Barracks, Preston (Light Infantry) – paired with 1st Battalion, Duke of Lancaster's Regiment (1 LANCS)
  - 4th Battalion, Yorkshire Regiment (Army Reserve), at Worsley Barracks, York (Light Infantry) – paired with 2 YORKS until November, then paired with 2nd Battalion, Mercian Regiment (2 MERCIAN)
  - 154 (Scottish) Regiment RLC, (Army Reserve), at Bothwell House, Dunfermline.
  - 75 Regiment Royal Engineers

== Second World War commanders ==
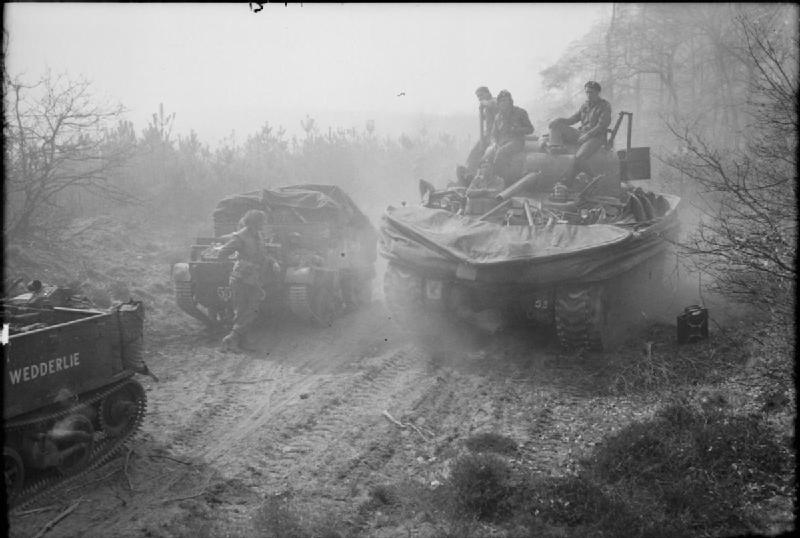
Sherman DD tank of the 44th Royal Tank Regiment, 4th Armoured Brigade, passing Universal Carriers of the 6th Battalion, King's Own Scottish Borderers east of the River Rhine, 25 March 1945.

During the Second World War:

- January 1940 − April 1941 Brigadier John Caunter
- April 1941 − April 1942 Brigadier Alexander (Alec) Gatehouse
- April−July 1942 Brigadier George Richards
- July−September 1942 Brigadier William Carr
- September−November 1942 Brigadier Marcus Roddick
- November 1942 − January 1943 Brigadier Charles (Roscoe) Harvey
- January−February 1943 Brigadier Dennis Newton-King
- February−December 1943 Brigadier John Currie
- December 1943 – March 1944 Brigadier Hugh Cracroft
- March–June 1944 Brigadier John Currie
- June 1944 – August 1945 Brigadier Michael Carver

== Brigade commanders ==
Recent commanders have included:

- 1976–1978 Brigadier Desmond Langley
- 1981–1984 Brigadier Charles Guthrie
- 1994–1996 Brigadier Richard Dannatt
- 1996–1998 Brigadier David Richards
- 1998–2000 Brigadier Bill Rollo
- 2000–2002 Brigadier Nicholas Smith
- 2002–2004 Brigadier Paul Gibson
- 2005–2007 Brigadier Chris Deverell
- 2007–2009 Brigadier Julian Free
- 2009–2011 Brigadier Richard Felton
- 2011–2013 Brigadier Bob Bruce
- 2013–2015 Brigadier Charlie Herbert
- 2015–2016 Brigadier Gerald Strickland
- 2016–2019 Brigadier Oliver Stokes
- 2019–2022 Brigadier Oliver Brown
- 2022–2023 Brigadier Marcus Mudd
- 2023–2024 Brigadier R J Singleton
- 2024–Present Brigadier O P B Dobson

== See also ==
- 4th Infantry Brigade (United Kingdom)
- British Armoured formations of World War II
- List of British brigades of the Second World War
