= Light Dragoons =

The Light Dragoons
- Cap badge of the Light Dragoons
- Active: 1 December 1992–
- Allegiance: United Kingdom
- Branch: British Army
- Type: Line cavalry
- Role: Light Cavalry
- Size: Regiment; 403 personnel
- Part of: Royal Armoured Corps
- Garrison/HQ: RHQ – Newcastle upon Tyne; Regiment – Catterick Garrison
- Nickname: "England's Northern Cavalry"
- Mottos: Viret in aeternum (It Flourishes Forever); Merebimur (We shall be Worthy)
- March: Quick – Balaklava; Slow – Denmark

Commanders
- Colonel-in-Chief: King Abdullah II of Jordan
- Colonel of the Regiment: Brigadier Angus GC Fair, CBE, DSO

Insignia
- Tactical Recognition Flash
- Arm Badge: NCOs – Royal Crest; From 15th/19th King's Royal Hussars; ORs – South Africa flash From 13th/18th Royal Hussars
- Abbreviation: LD

The Light Dragoons (LD) is a cavalry regiment in the British Army. The regiment has a light cavalry role and specialises in mounted and dismounted reconnaissance. The Light Dragoons recruit mainly in Northern England, from County Durham, Northumberland, Tyne and Wear, South Yorkshire and the East Riding of Yorkshire. For this reason, the regiment is known as "England's Northern Cavalry". It is currently based in Catterick Garrison, North Yorkshire.

== Background ==
The term 'Light Dragoons' has a much earlier history. The British Army experimented with light cavalry in the 1740s, prompted by the French creation of hussar regiments. However, it was not until the 1750s that the British converted some dragoon regiments into light cavalry, these regiments being officially designated 'Light Dragoons'. All British light cavalry regiments (numbered 7th and upwards) were titled Light Dragoons until 1806–1807, when four were re-classified as 'Hussars'. From 1816 more Light Dragoon regiments were reclassified as lancers or hussars, a tendency that continued until the 13th Light Dragoons became the 13th Hussars in 1861.

== History ==
=== Early history ===
The regiment was formed in 1992 at Haig Barracks in Hohne from the amalgamation of two regiments, the 13th/18th Royal Hussars (Queen Mary's Own) and the 15th/19th The King's Royal Hussars. All of the antecedent regiments had been regiments of "light dragoons" during the 18th and 19th centuries, including the Napoleonic Wars.

B Squadron (The Guards) was the first squadron of the newly formed regiment to undertake a tour of duty; sent to Bosnia and Herzegovina in May 1993 on peacekeeping duties. They were followed by C Squadron (The Legion) in November 1993 and later by A and D squadrons in 1994. In total the regiment performed 13 operational tours of Bosnia, leading them to be described in 2001 by the Chief of Defence Staff, General Sir Charles Guthrie as "the best regiment in the army at present: consistently the best officered, best recruited and all round most effective". For all of those initial tours the Light Dragoons deployed on Combat Vehicle Reconnaissance (Tracked).

In July 2003, The Light Dragoons sent units to Iraq on Operation Telic 2, followed by Operation Telic 6 in May 2005. Here the Regiment assisted with post-conflict stabilisation, training the police force, and fighting in the counter-insurgency operations.

In October 2006, elements of the regiment were deployed on a tour of duty in Helmand Province, Afghanistan on Operation Herrick 5 with 3 Commando Brigade. This was followed by Operation Herrick 6 in April 2007 with 12 Mechanised Brigade. The regiment deployed as a battle group on Operation Herrick 10 in April 2009 and took part in Operation Panther's Claw in the summer of 2009. The regiment's last deployment to Afghanistan was on Operation Herrick 16 in April 2012. Here it provided the Brigade Reconnaissance Force, Formation Reconnaissance and mentoring teams for local forces.

In 2014, soldiers from The Light Dragoons deployed to Bosnia on Operation Althea; providing a mobile reconnaissance capability for the EU forces ahead of the Bosnian elections.

=== Deployments since 2015 ===
In 2015, the Light Dragoons subordinated to 4th Infantry Brigade and moved to a new home at Gaza Barracks in Catterick Garrison.

In March 2017, A Squadron (The Empire) deployed to Poland on Op Cabrit as part of the NATO Enhanced Forward Presence. They were followed by B Squadron (The Guards) in October 2017 and C Squadron (The Legion) in April 2020.

The Light Dragoons deployed a platoon to Afghanistan in 2018 on Op Toral.

In December 2020, The Light Dragoons deployed to Mali on Operation Newcombe, as part of the UK's contribution to the UN's peacekeeping force. Here they formed the Long Range Reconnaissance Group, conducting patrols of up to 1500 km in length, in order to provide intelligence to the UN forces.

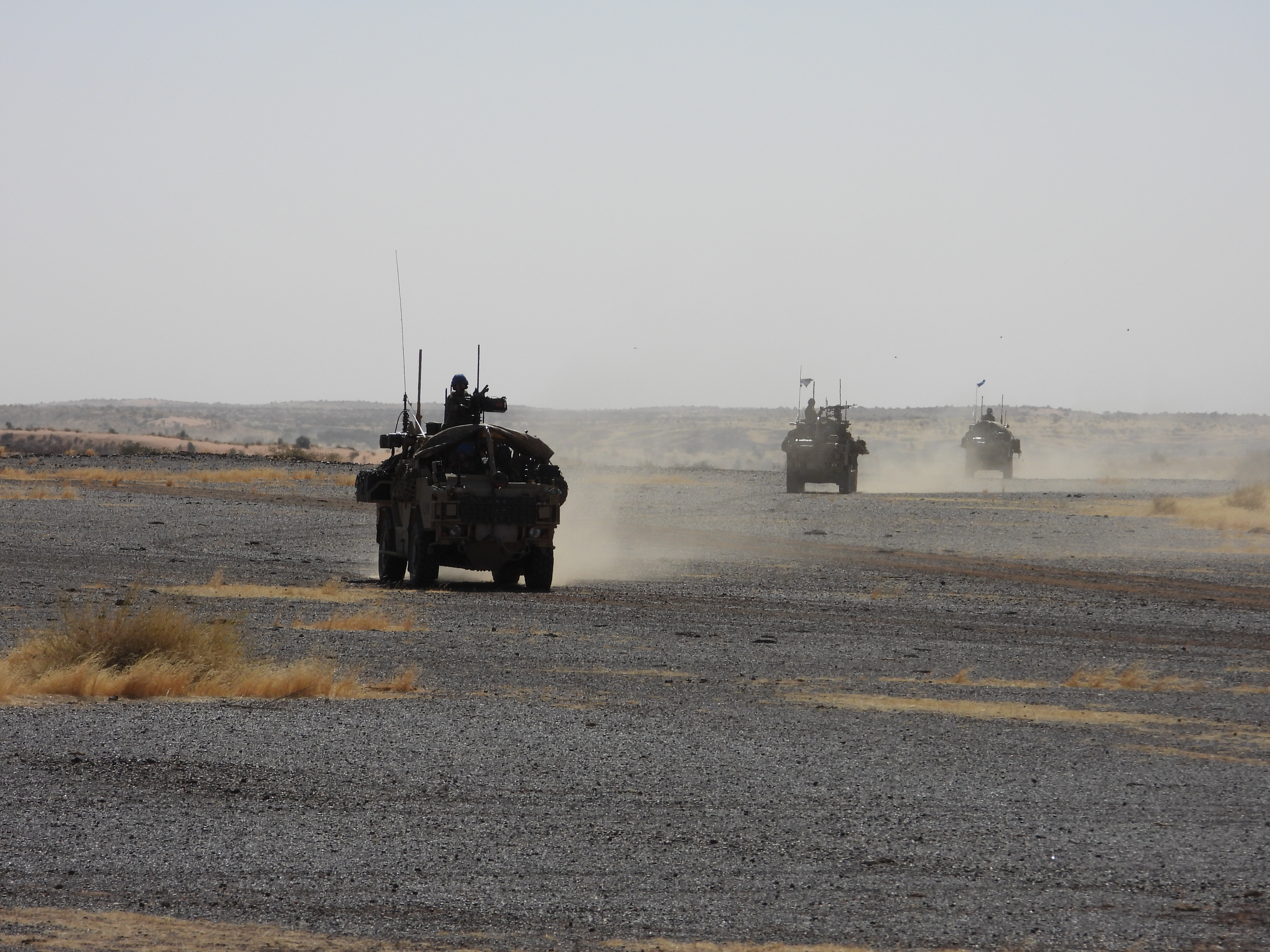
Light Dragoons on patrol in Mali

== Operational Role ==
The Light Dragoon's primary role is Formation Reconnaissance; a varied job that primarily involves operating ahead of the main fighting force, often in enemy or unknown territory in order to find key information on the local area and any enemy within it. With this information the Light Dragoons are expected to inform the main fighting force behind them, strike opportune targets or interact with the local population to build relations, gather more intelligence and aid local planning and development.

The regiment is now equipped with Jackal armoured fighting vehicles. The Light Dragoons is paired with the Queen's Own Yeomanry, an Army Reserve light cavalry regiment.

The Light Dragoons divides into the following structure:

- Regimental Headquarters based at Fenham Barracks
- Light Cavalry Regiment
  - Headquarters Squadron - Coyote and Panther CLV equipped
  - A Squadron (The Empire)- Jackal equipped
  - B Squadron (The Guards)- Jackal equipped
  - C Squadron (The Legion)- Jackal equipped.

== Regimental museum ==
The Newcastle Discovery Museum includes the regimental museum of the Light Dragoons and the Northumberland Hussars.

== Colonels-in-chief ==
Colonels-in-Chief have been:

- 1993–1996: Diana, Princess of Wales
- 1997–2002: Princess Margaret, Countess of Snowdon
- 2003–present: King Abdullah II of Jordan

== Regimental colonels ==
Colonels of the Regiment have been:

- 1992–1995: Col. Robert John William ffrench Blake (late 13th/18th Royal Hussars)
- 1995–2000: Brig. Charles Anthony Gilbert Wells, CBE
- 2000–2008: Lt-Gen. Sir Roderick Alexander Cordy-Simpson, KBE, CB
- 2008–2013: Maj-Gen. Andrew Stewart, CB, CBE
- 2013–2020 Maj-Gen. David Rutherford-Jones CB
- 2020–2026 Brig. Angus Watson, MBE
- 2026–Present Brig. Angus George Costeker Fair, CBE, DSO

== Commanding officers ==
Commanding Officers have included:

- 1992–1993: Lt Col Andrew Richard Evelyn De Cardonnel Stewart, CB, CBE
- 1993–1996: Lt Col Robert I. Webb-Bowen
- 1996–1997: Lt Col Timothy J. Checketts
- 1997–1999: Lt Col David John Rutherford-Jones, CB
- 1999–2002: Lt Col Simon R. Levey
- 2002–2004: Lt Col David R. Amos, KCVS
- 2004–2006: Lt Col Robin C. Matthews
- 2006–2009: Lt Col H. Angus Watson, MBE
- 2009–2011: Lt Col Angus G. C. Fair, DSO, OBE
- 2011–2013: Lt Col Samuel J. Plant, MBE
- 2013–2016: Lt Col James M. Senior
- 2016–2019: Lt Col Benjamin M. J. Cossens
- 2019–2021: Lt Col Thomas R. M. Robinson, OBE
- 2021–2024: Lt Col Jonathan Harris
- 2024-present: Lt Col Dan Lenherr

== Lineage ==
1881 Childers Reforms	1922 Amalgamations	1990 Options for Change - today
13th Hussars	13th/18th Royal Hussars (Queen Mary's Own)	Light Dragoons
18th (Queen Mary's Own) Hussars	13th/18th Royal Hussars (Queen Mary's Own)	Light Dragoons
15th (The King's) Hussars	15th/19th The King's Royal Hussars	Light Dragoons
19th (Queen Alexandra's Own Royal) Hussars	15th/19th The King's Royal Hussars	Light Dragoons

== Alliances ==
- Canada – The Royal Canadian Hussars (Montreal)
- Canada – The South Alberta Light Horse
- Australia – 1st/15th Royal New South Wales Lancers
- India – 1st Horse (Skinner's Horse)
- Pakistan – 6th Lancers
- Pakistan – 19th Lancers
- Malaysia – 2nd Royal Armoured Regiment
- Royal Navy – HMS Northumberland
- France – 4e Chasseurs d'Afrique

=== Affiliated yeomanry ===
- The Queen's Own Yeomanry

== Order of precedence ==
Preceded by King's Royal Hussars	British Army order of precedence	Succeeded by Royal Tank Regiment
