= Royal Armoured Corps =

Armour arm of the British Army

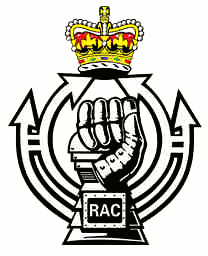
- Badge of the Royal Armoured Corps
- Active: 1939 – present
- Country: United Kingdom
- Branch: British Army
- Type: Armoured corps
- Role: Armoured warfare CBRN defense Reconnaissance
- Size: 12 regiments
- Garrison/HQ: Bovington Garrison
- Vehicles: Challenger 2, Challenger 3, Ajax
- Website: www.army.mod.uk/who-we-are/corps-regiments-and-units/royal-armoured-corps/

Commanders
- Colonel Commandant: Maj-Gen Nicholas C. L. Perry, DSO, MBE

Insignia
- Abbreviation: RAC

The Royal Armoured Corps (RAC) is the armoured arm of the British Army, that together with the Household Cavalry provides its armour capability, with vehicles such as the Challenger 2 and the Warrior tracked armoured vehicle. It includes most of the Army's armoured regiments, both the Royal Tank Regiment and those converted from old horse cavalry regiments. In September 2024, it comprised fourteen regiments: ten Regular Regiments; four Army Reserve. Although the Household Cavalry Regiment (the Life Guards and the Blues and Royals) provide an armoured regiment, they are not part of the RAC.

== History ==
The RAC was created on 4 April 1939, just before World War II started, by combining regiments from the cavalry of the line which had mechanised with the Royal Tank Corps (renamed Royal Tank Regiment). As the war went on and other regular cavalry and Territorial Army Yeomanry units became mechanised, the corps was enlarged. A significant number of infantry battalions also converted to the armoured role as RAC regiments. In addition, the RAC created its own training and support regiments. Finally, in 1944, the RAC absorbed the regiments of the Reconnaissance Corps.

== Present day ==
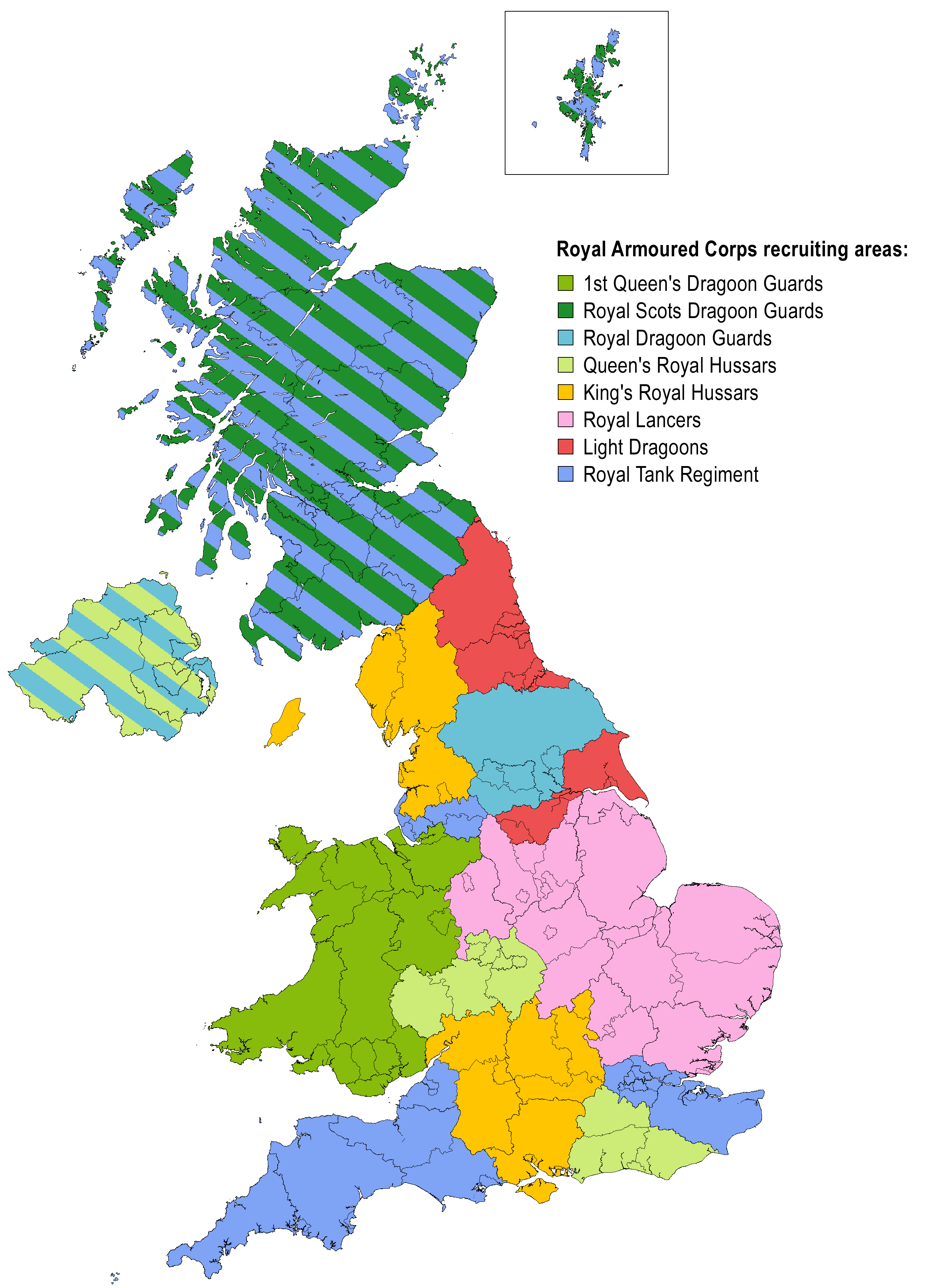
Recruiting areas of the regular army regiments

=== Regiments ===
The Royal Armoured Corps is divided into regiments which operate main battle tanks (Armour), those in reconnaissance vehicles (Armoured Cavalry), and those in Weapons Mount vehicles (Light Cavalry). Of these, three regiments are designated Dragoon Guards, two as Hussars, one as Lancers and one as Dragoons. The remaining regiment is the Royal Tank Regiment. In the regular army, there are three armoured regiments, three armoured cavalry regiments and three light cavalry regiments. In the army reserve, there is one armoured regiment and three light cavalry regiments.

Being a corps, the RAC is made up of several independent regiments, but the corps does control a few separate units which include:

- Training and Staff
  - AFV Training Group
  - Regimental Headquarters, Royal Armoured Corps
  - The Armour Centre, Bovington Camp
  - Royal Armoured Corps Training Regiment, at Allenby Barracks, Bovington Camp
- Regular Army
  - 1st The Queen's Dragoon Guards (QDG) - Light Cavalry – 3rd Deep Reconnaissance Strike Brigade
  - Royal Scots Dragoon Guards (SCOTS DG) - Light Cavalry – 7th Light Mechanised Brigade
  - Royal Dragoon Guards (RDG) - Armoured Cavalry – 20th Armoured Brigade
  - Queen's Royal Hussars (QRH) – Armour – 20th Armoured Brigade
  - Royal Lancers (RL) - Armoured Cavalry – 3rd Deep Reconnaissance Strike Brigade
  - King's Royal Hussars (KRH) – Armour – 12th Armoured Brigade
  - Light Dragoons (LD) - Light Cavalry – 4th Light Brigade
  - Royal Tank Regiment^{2} (RTR) – Armour – 12th Armoured Brigade

A Royal Tank Regiment CBRN reconnaissance and survey squadron forms part of 28 Engineer Regiment (C-CBRN), Royal Engineers

- Army Reserve - Yeomanry
  - Royal Yeomanry (RY) - Light Cavalry – 3rd Deep Reconnaissance Strike Brigade
  - Queen's Own Yeomanry (QOY) - Light Cavalry – 19th Light Brigade
  - Scottish and North Irish Yeomanry (SNIY) - Light Cavalry – 19th Light Brigade
  - Royal Wessex Yeomanry (RWxY) - Armour – 12th Armoured Brigade

A system of pairing exists in the British Army of Regular to Reserve unit. Through this, operational and training cycles are aligned, resources shared and strategic depth enabled. In the Royal Armoured Corps this manifests with each yeomanry unit being paired with a regular unit of the same role.

Regular Army	Army Reserve
1st The Queen's Dragoon Guards	Royal Yeomanry
Royal Scots Dragoon Guards	Scottish & North Irish Yeomanry
Light Dragoons	Queen's Own Yeomanry
King's Royal Hussars	Royal Wessex Yeomanry (Note: The Royal Wessex Yeomanry provides replacement soldiers for armoured regiments, and therefore is paired with all three regular army units operating main battle tanks)
Queen's Royal Hussars	Royal Wessex Yeomanry
Royal Tank Regiment	Royal Wessex Yeomanry

=== Basing ===
- Tidworth - Kings Royal Hussars; Royal Tank Regiment, The Queen's Royal Hussars (The Queen's Own and Royal Irish)
- Catterick - Royal Lancers; Light Dragoons
- Battlesbury Barracks, Warminster - Royal Dragoon Guards
- Swanton Morley - 1st The Queen's Dragoon Guards
- Leuchars - Royal Scots Dragoon Guards
- London & Midlands - Royal Yeomanry
- South of England - Royal Wessex Yeomanry
- North of England - Queen's Own Yeomanry
- Scotland & Northern Ireland - Scottish and North Irish Yeomanry

==== Band ====
The Band of the Royal Armoured Corps was the single band representing the RAC provided by the Royal Corps of Army Music. This was formed in 2014 by the amalgamation of the Heavy Cavalry and Cambrai Band, and the Light Cavalry Band. The Band of the Royal Armoured Corps is stationed at Catterick. However, as part of the 2019 reorganisation of the CAMUS, the band was merged into British Army Band Catterick.

=== Overseas and Associated Units ===
In addition to its British-based regiments, the Royal Armoured Corps also included several overseas Crown units that were incorporated into its order of battle. These included:

- Royal Hong Kong Regiment (The Volunteers) — a locally raised Crown regiment of the Hong Kong Garrison, affiliated with the Royal Armoured Corps from the early 1960s and formally incorporated into its order of battle under the Royal Hong Kong Regiment Regulations 1970 (L.N. 190/70). The regiment operated under the operational command of the Commander British Forces Hong Kong and was subject to the Army Act 1955 and Queen’s Regulations. Officers were commissioned in the name of the Sovereign, and the unit formed part of the British Forces Overseas Hong Kong until its disbandment in 1995.

== Reorganisations ==
=== Delivering Security in a Changing World (2004) ===
The reorganisation of the Army announced in 2004 led to significant changes to the Royal Armoured Corps. Reorganisation that began in 2003 would see three armoured regiments removed from Germany to the UK, with one re-roled as an FR regiment. In addition, three Challenger 2 squadrons will be converted to Interim Medium Armour Squadrons, while each FR regiment will gain a Command and Support Squadron.

As part of the reorganisation, postings will be realigned:

- UK based regiments
  - Catterick: Armoured Regiment (RDG) (1 Armoured Infantry Brigade), Formation Reconnaissance Regiment (QRL) (1 Armoured Infantry Brigade)
  - Tidworth: 2 x Armoured Regiment (2RTR, KRH), (1st Mechanized Brigade, 12th Mechanized Brigade,)
  - Swanton Morley: Formation Reconnaissance Regiment (LD) (Theatre Troops)
  - Warminster: Training/Demonstration squadron (A Squadron, RTR)
  - Honington: Armoured Regiment (1RTR)
  - Bovington: HQ RAC
- Germany based regiments
  - Sennelager: Armoured Regiment (QRH), Formation Reconnaissance Regiment QDG (20 Armoured Brigade)

=== Strategic Defence and Security Review (2010)/Army 2020 ===
In 2012, following the Strategic Defence and Security Review of 2010, specific proposals about the make up of the future British Army were announced under the title Army 2020. These proposals were intended to reduce the size of the army to around 82,000. The Royal Armoured Corps was to be reduced by a total of two regiments, with the 9th/12th Royal Lancers amalgamated with the Queen's Royal Lancers to form a single lancer regiment, the Royal Lancers, and the 1st and 2nd Royal Tank Regiments joined to form a single Royal Tank Regiment.

The Royal Armoured Corps will also see a shift with one third of its regiments operating as armoured regiments with main battle tanks, another third as formation reconnaissance regiments and a final third as light cavalry using Jackal vehicles. Armoured regiments would consist of Type 56 regiments, each with three Sabre Squadrons (comprising 18 Challenger 2 Tanks each) and a command and recce squadron. Armoured Cavalry or formation reconnaissance regiments would also have a command and recce squadron and three Sabre Squadrons; which will initially be equipped with Combat Vehicle Reconnaissance (Tracked), and then with Future Rapid Effect System Scout vehicles. Jackal regiments will be part of the Adaptable Force, comprising three Sabre Squadrons (each with 16 vehicles). These regiments will be paired with a Yeomanry regiment.

The new structure of the Reaction Force will see three armoured regiments, each assigned to a new "Armoured Infantry Brigade", alongside a formation reconnaissance regiment (renamed as "armoured cavalry"), two armoured infantry battalions and a heavy protected mobility battalion. These six regiments will fall operationally under what will become known as the "reaction forces", which will be the army's high readiness force. The remaining three regiments will be located with the remainder of the regular army under what has been term the "adaptable forces", which will provide a pool of resources to back up operations conducted by the "reaction forces".

This new basing plan on 5 March 2013 gave an overview of where the regiments will be based. All RAC regiments will be UK based, with the 1st The Queen's Dragoon Guards moving to Swanton Morley, The Royal Scots Dragoon Guards moving to the Leuchars area, the Queen's Royal Hussars to Tidworth, the Royal Lancers settling in Catterick, the Light Dragoons in Catterick, and the Royal Tank Regiment to Tidworth.

The Army 2020 structure for the Royal Armoured Corps was:

Armoured Regiment (Challenger 2)	Armoured Cavalry (Scimitar)	Light Cavalry (Jackal)	Light Cavalry – Army Reserve (Jackal)
1st Armoured Infantry Brigade		7th Infantry Brigade	
The King's Royal Hussars	The Royal Lancers (Queen Elizabeth's Own) The Royal Dragoon Guards	Queen's Dragoon Guards	The Royal Yeomanry
12th Armoured Infantry Brigade		4th Infantry Brigade	
The Royal Tank Regiment		The Light Dragoons	The Queen's Own Yeomanry
20th Armoured Infantry Brigade		51st Infantry Brigade	
The Queen's Royal Hussars (Queen's Own and Royal Irish)		The Royal Scots Dragoon Guards (Carabiniers and Greys)	The Scottish and North Irish Yeomanry
The Royal Wessex Yeomanry (MBT crew replacement, admin only)			

=== Future Soldier (2021) ===
In November 2021, the UK Government published Future Soldier, the planned reform of the British Army following its integrated defence and security review. Part of this would see a reorganisation of the regiments of the Royal Armoured Corps.

==== 1st (United Kingdom) Division ====
1st (UK) Division is the UK's primary land element for operations outside the European theatre, as well as operations supporting NATO's flanks. It consists of four infantry-centered brigades - two of these contain regular light cavalry regiments, while a third serves as a parent formation for units of the Army Reserve.

- 4th Light Brigade
  - Light Dragoons (Light Cavalry)
- 7th Light Mechanised Brigade
  - Royal Scots Dragoon Guards (Light Cavalry)
- 19th Light Brigade
  - Scottish and North Irish Yeomanry (Army Reserve) (Note: Reserve regiment providing reinforcements to light cavalry units.)
  - Queen's Own Yeomanry (Army Reserve)

==== 3rd (United Kingdom) Division ====
3rd (UK) Division is the UK's main reaction force, intended to act as a lead formation alongside NATO, and primarily consists of a pair of armoured brigades containing the army's armoured and armoured cavalry units, and a third brigade containing the remainder of the army's armoured cavalry units tasked primarily with reconnaissance for deep fires from MLRS systems.

- 12th Armoured Brigade
  - King's Royal Hussars (Armoured Cavalry)
  - Royal Tank Regiment (Armour) (Note: Regiment equipped with main battle tanks.)
  - Royal Wessex Yeomanry (Army Reserve) (Note: Reserve regiment providing reinforcements to armoured units.)
- 20th Armoured Brigade
  - Royal Dragoon Guards (Armoured Cavalry)
  - Queen's Royal Hussars (Armour)
- 3rd Deep Reconnaissance Strike Brigade
  - Household Cavalry Regiment (Armoured Cavalry) (Note: The Household Cavalry Regiment is one of two operational regiments formed of squadrons of the Life Guards and the Blues and Royals; these are units of the Household Cavalry, which is a separate administrative formation from the Royal Armoured Corps.)
  - Royal Lancers (Armoured Cavalry)
  - 1st The Queen's Dragoon Guards (Light Cavalry)
  - Royal Yeomanry (Army Reserve)

== Order of precedence ==
Preceded by Household Cavalry	Order of Precedence	Succeeded by Royal Regiment of Artillery

== Related units ==
This unit is allied with the following:

- Royal Canadian Armoured Corps
- Royal Australian Armoured Corps
- Royal New Zealand Armoured Corps
- Kor Armor Diraja (Royal Armoured Corps) - Malaysia
- Bangladesh Army Armoured Corps
- Pakistan Armoured Corps

== Colonels Commandant (Cavalry) ==
Colonels Commandant were:

- 1939– vacant
- 1947 F.M. The Rt Hon Bernard Montgomery, 1st Viscount Montgomery of Alamein, KG, GCB, DSO
- 1947– Gen. Sir Richard McCreery, GCB, KBE, DSO, MC
- 1950–?1952 Gen. Sir Charles Keightley, GCB, GBE, DSO
- 1958– Gen. Sir Charles Keightley, GCB, GBE, DSO
- 1968– F.M. Sir Richard Hull, KG, GCB, DSO
- 1974– F.M. The Rt Hon Richard Carver, Baron Carver of Shackleford, GCB, CBE, DSO, MC
- 1977–1980 Gen. Sir Jack Harman, GCB, OBE, MC, ADCGen
- 1980–1982 Gen. Sir RobertFord, GCB, CBE
- 1982–1985 F.M. Sir John Stanier, GCB, MBE, ADCGen
- 1985–1988 F.M. Sir Nigel Bagnall, GCB, CVO, MC
- 1988–1993 Gen. Sir Brian Kenny, GCB, CBE
- 1993–1995 Gen. Sir Jeremy Blacker, KCB, CBE
- 1995–1999 Lt-Gen. Sir Robert Hayman-Joyce, KCB, CBE
- 1999 Maj-Gen. David Jenkins, CB, CBE
- 2000–2004 Maj-Gen. Peter Gilchrist, CB
- 2004– Maj-Gen. Richard Shirreff, CB
