= Gremmendorf =

- Stadtteil of Münster
- Interactive map of Gremmendorf
- Location within Germany Location within North Rhine-Westphalia
- Coordinates: 51°56′N 07°40′E
- Country: Germany
- State: North Rhine-Westphalia
- Admin. region: Münster
- District: Urban district
- City: Münster
- Elevation: 60 m (200 ft)

Population
  - Total: 11,000
- Time zone: UTC+01:00 (CET)
  - Summer (DST): UTC+02:00 (CEST)
- Vehicle registration: MS
- Website: www.muenster.de

Gremmendorf is a locale in the city of Münster, North Rhine-Westphalia. The area lies south-eastern of the city-center, has a population of 11,000 (according to a December 31, 2009 census), and belongs to the south-eastern municipal district. Additionally, the locale is divided into two subvisions of Gremmendorf-West and Gremmendorf-East, of which the Gremmendorf-West subdivision is more central, and clearly larger by area. The locale of Gremmendorf encompasses the area of the Dortmund-Ems Canal to the large capelin and high bank.

== History ==
Gremmendorf is probably less than 200 years old and is therefore one of the youngest locales in Münster. On a contemporary map of Münster from the year 1763, Gremmendorf is nowhere to be found. The locale is the result of a small settlement around the farmyard of Gremme in the Delstrup peasantry. The Delstrup, along with the Geist and Mecklenbeck peasantries belonged to the rural community of Lamberti, and the authority of Mauritz. Delstrup became incorporated into the urban area of Münster in 1903, due to the city's expansion. Due to this expansion on October 1, 1903, the Münster-Neubeckum route of the Westphalian state railway opened, with a stop at the Erbdrosten Way, which was later to be called Gremmendorf. In the years to come, the name Delstrup eventually faded out in favour of what it is known as today. The restaurant Waldesruh, known today as Haus Heuckmann, was first built in 1905 at Gremmendorfer Way, and in the same year was added to the then new train station as part of the same facility. In following years, barracks for Prussian military personnel were built around Gremmendorfer Way due to armed mobilization in preparation for the First World War. This effort was also supported by the transformation of the Loddenheide from an industrial area to a military base, as well as the building of Luftnachrichtenkaserne 1936 (radio transmission outpost 1936), at Albersloher Way. Ever since 1920, one differentiates Old-Gremmendorf (farmyards around Erbdrosten Way) and New-Gremmendorf in lieu of new settlement around Gremmendorfer Way. After the Second World War, the barracks originally intended for German soldiers were taken over and utilized by British occupational forces as part of Osnabrück Garrison. (Following the defeat of Nazi Germany, the country was divided into 4 separate sectors: American, French, British, and Soviet; the Soviet area would eventually be known as East Germany). Due to this, the residential density of Old-Gremmendorf sharply rose, especially around Albersloher Way. In 1975, Gremmendorf was officially assigned as part of the south-eastern municipal district.

== Culture ==
Culturally, Gremmendorf offers a community association, known as K.-G. Pängelanton. Connected to the association are the Niederdeutsche Heimat-Bühne (a theatrical group performing plays in the Low German dialect), and a sports club, SC Gremmendorf since 1946. Current notable figures include Heinrich Löwe, as founder, and Hermann Treff, as longtime chairman of the locale's prestigious gun club, Otto Hersing, a U-Boot captain of the First World War, as well as Franz and Josef Horstmann as co-founders of SC Gremmendorf since 1946. Gremmendorf's largest church community is the Roman Catholic St. Ida Gemeinde, whose church is situated at Anton-Knubel Way.

== Particularities ==
There isn't a single independent street in Gremmendorf. Almost all roads end in Way, as likely observed in above paragraphs.

== Sights ==
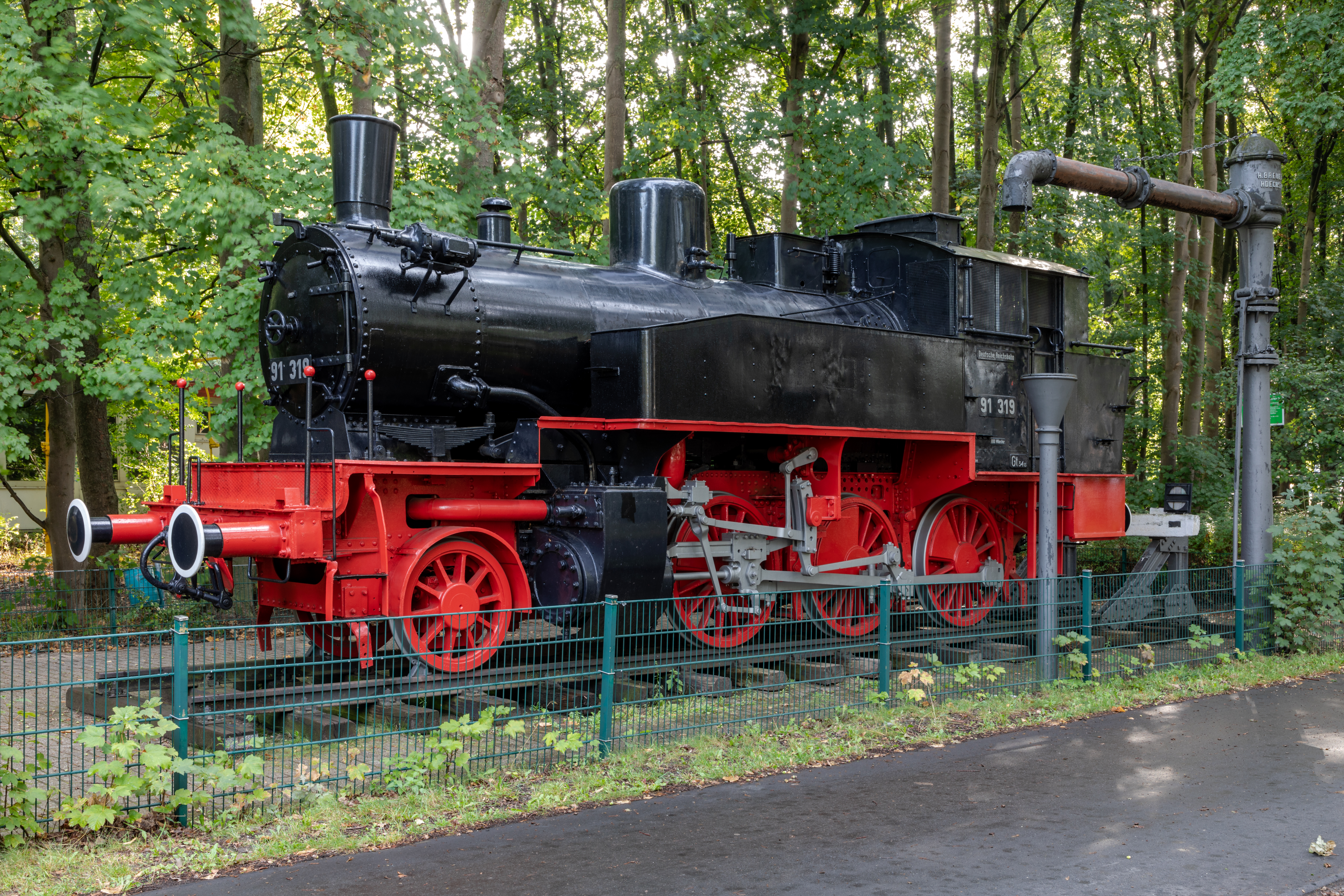
Locomotive Pängelanton, belonging to the railway history museum of the same name

Next to the long shopping street in the locale-center, is Gremmendorf's main landmark. It is a classic steam locomotive, called Pängelanton, which is at the crossing of Albersloher and Erbdrosten Way. Gremmendorf is also known for the British York barracks, on Albersloher Way. The memorial at Gremmendorfer Way is a monument to the fallen soldiers of the Second World War. Every year, members of Gremmendorf's community clubs, as well as members of the St. Ida Gemeinde gather for Volkstrauertag.
