= 15th/19th The King's Royal Hussars =

- Badge of 15th/19th The King's Royal Hussars
- Active: 11 April 1922 – 1 December 1992
- Country: United Kingdom
- Branch: British Army
- Type: Line Cavalry
- Role: Formation Reconnaissance
- Size: Regiment
- Part of: Royal Armoured Corps
- Garrison/HQ: Fenham Barracks, Newcastle upon Tyne
- Motto: Merebimur (We shall be Worthy) (Latin)
- Colours: Blue - Yellow - Red & Blue
- Anniversaries: 21 December Sahagún Day; 23 September Assaye Day

Commanders
- Colonel-in-Chief: Princess Margaret

Insignia
- Identification symbol: NCOs - Royal Crest. All Ranks Assaye and Elephant on belt buckle.

The 15th/19th The King's Royal Hussars was a cavalry regiment of the British Army. The regiment was formed by the amalgamation of the 15th The King's Hussars and the 19th Royal Hussars in 1922 and, after service in the Second World War, it was amalgamated with the 13th/18th Royal Hussars to form the Light Dragoons in 1992.

== History ==
=== Interwar ===
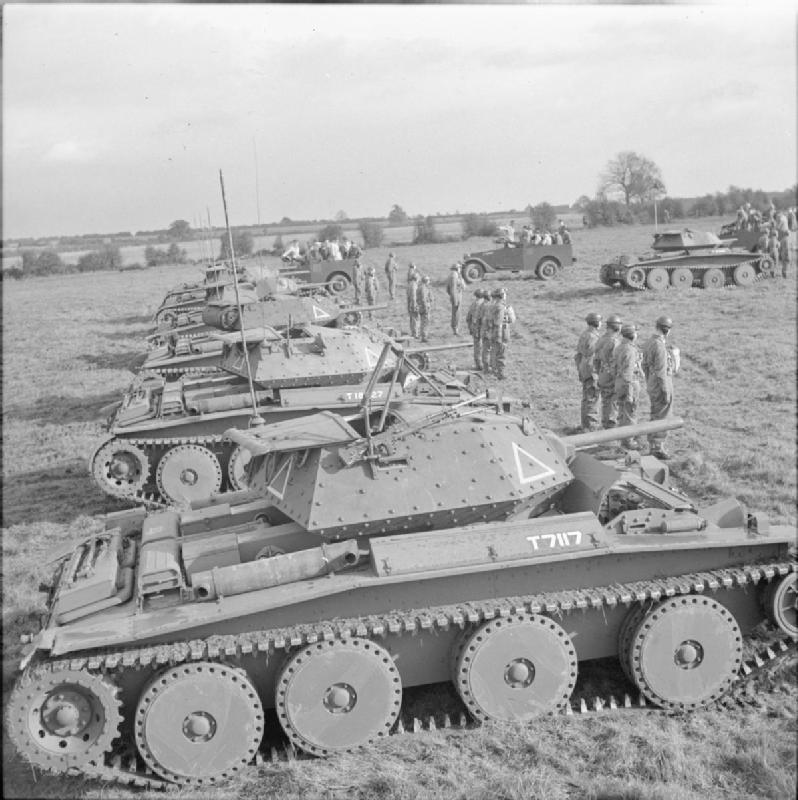
Covenanter tanks of 15th/19th The King's Royal Hussars on parade at Wellingborough for inspection by Alexander Cadogan, 1 November 1941

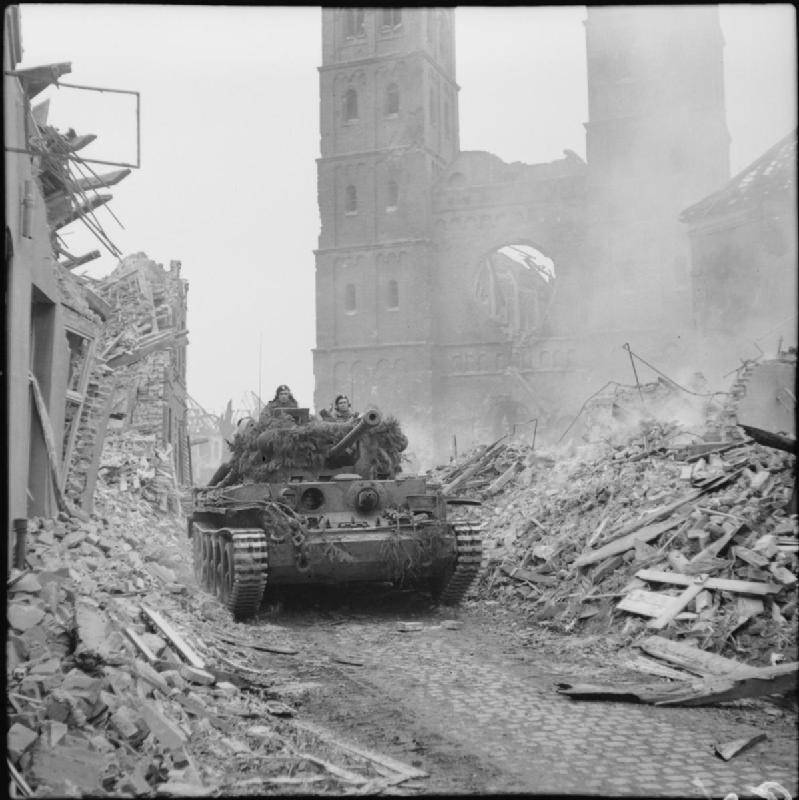
A Cromwell tank of 15th/19th The King's Royal Hussars advances through the rubble of Uedem, 28 February 1945

The regiment was created, as part of the reduction in cavalry in the aftermath of the First World War, by the amalgamation of the 15th The King's Hussars and the 19th Royal Hussars on 11 April 1922 to form the 15th/19th Hussars. It briefly dropped the 19th numeral from its title in October 1932, becoming the 15th The King's Royal Hussars, before regaining it in December 1933.

The amalgamated regiment formed at Assaye Barracks, Tidworth in 1922 and remained there until January 1924 when it sailed for service in Egypt. The regiment was based at Helmieh, with detachments at Sidi Bishr and Mena Camp, until December 1926 when it moved to Abbassia. The regiment sailed for service in India in 1928 being based as Risalpur. The regiment took part in operations on the North West Frontier during the Redshirt Rebellion of 1930-31. In 1934, the regiment left India, being based at Shorncliffe then based at Tidworth from 1935-1937.

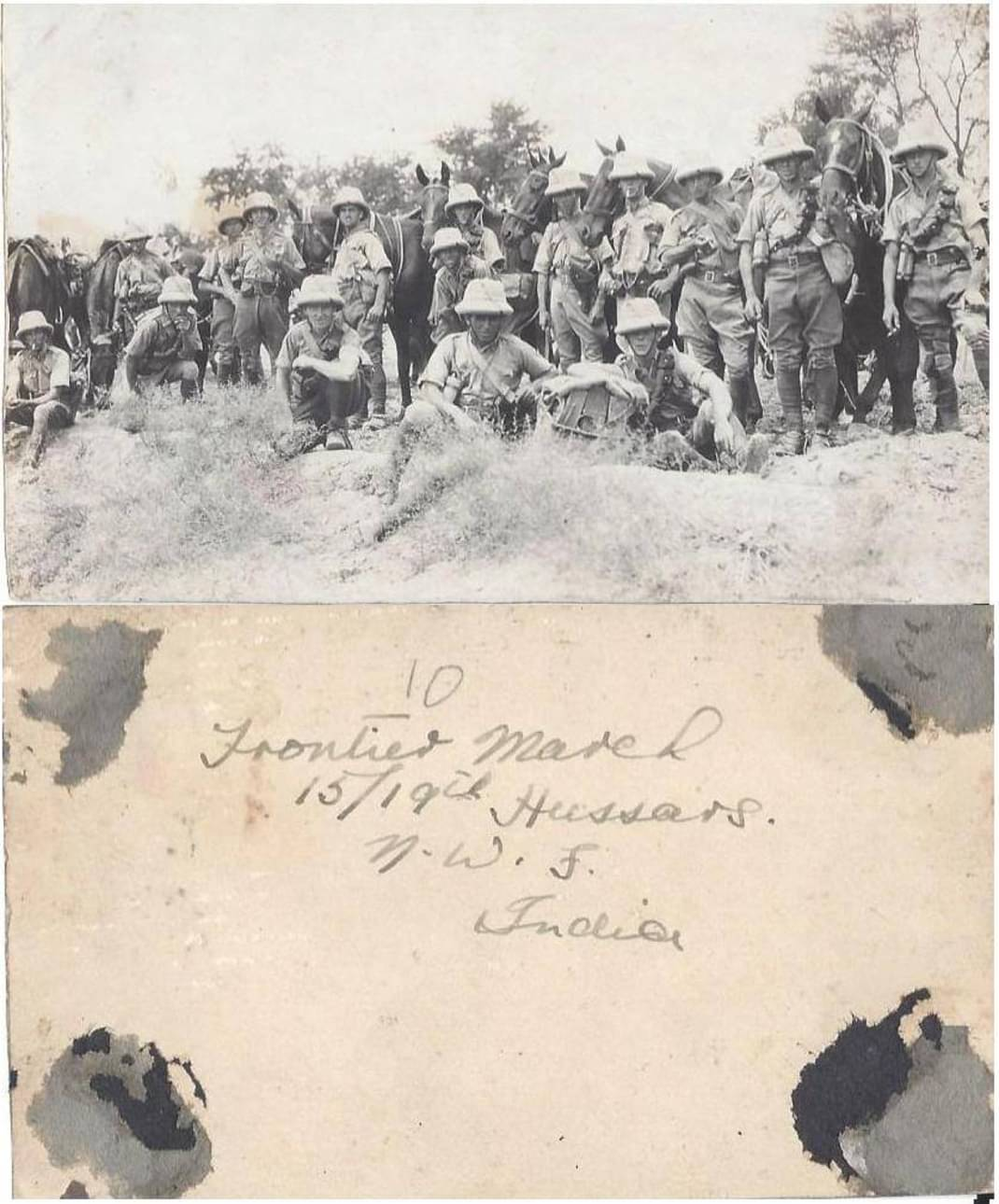
15th/19th The King's Royal Hussars deployed to the North-West Frontier Province

=== Second World War ===
At the outbreak of the Second World War, the regiment was based at York, serving as the divisional reconnaissance regiment for the 3rd Infantry Division. The regiment was deployed with the division as part of the British Expeditionary Force, and fought in the Battle of France: it suffered heavy losses during the German advance and, having left all its armour and vehicles behind, took part in the Dunkirk evacuation.

Following the withdrawal, the regiment was assigned to the 3rd Motor Machine Gun Brigade, which was redesignated as the 28th Armoured Brigade and assigned to the 9th Armoured Division. A cadre was detached to form the 23rd Hussars in December 1940. The regiment remained in the United Kingdom until August 1944, when it moved to France to serve as the divisional armoured reconnaissance regiment for the 11th Armoured Division.

=== Post war ===
The Regiment departed Germany for Belgium in September 1945 and arrived in the Canal Zone in Egypt the following month. The regiment was assigned to the 3rd Infantry Division. It subsequently deployed to Palestine in December 1945, returning to Egypt in 1947, before onward transfer to Sudan in November 1947. It was the first cavalry regiment to be stationed in the Sudan since the 21st Lancers fought at the Battle of Omdurman in 1898.

The Regiment moved to Knightsbridge Barracks in Lübeck in October 1949 and to McLeod Barracks in Neumünster in November 1951. It became the recce regiment for 7th Armoured Division and relocated to Combermere Barracks in Wesendorf in March 1953. In June 1954, it deployed to Malaya, with regimental headquarters and one squadron based at Ipoh and the other squadrons at Taiping and Raub, during the Malayan Emergency. In June 1957, a troop was deployed to Muscat during the Jebel Akhdar War. The regiment then joined 39th Infantry Brigade, moving to Lisanelly Camp in Omagh in August 1957 and then became an armoured car training regiment based at Deerbolt Camp near Barnard Castle in May 1959.

The regiment was re-roled as a nuclear escort regiment based at Swinton Barracks in Munster in September 1961 and then moved to Bhurtpore Barracks at Tidworth Camp in January 1968. It returned to West Germany in November 1969, where it joined 11th Infantry Brigade and was based at Wessex Barracks in Bad Fallingbostel. The Regiment (minus 'B' Squadron) had its first operational tour in Northern Ireland in 1971 being based at Long Kesh from August to December 1971, following the introduction of internment of Provisional Irish Republican Army suspects. From January to April 1973, 'A' and 'C' Squadrons were deployed to Northern Ireland and Lance Corporal William Stuart was awarded the Military Medal for gallantry. The Regiment was based at Lisanelly Camp in Omagh in November 1974. It then moved to a recce role, equipped with Scorpion and Fox, for 5th Infantry Brigade based at Aliwal Barracks in Tidworth Camp in May 1976; from there it deployed squadrons for the United Nations Peacekeeping Force in Cyprus. During this period, one squadron was deployed to Cyprus, equipped with Ferret Scout Cars, to serve as the resident armoured car squadron.

In September 1977, the regiment was deployed back to Germany, where it was assigned to the 3rd Armoured Division and based at Alanbrooke Barracks in Paderborn: from there it continued to send units to Northern Ireland as part of Operation Banner and undertook guarding duties at the Maze Prison. In November 1984, the main body of the Regiment returned to England as the Royal Armoured Corps Training Regiment at Bovington Camp in Dorset, although a squadron was again deployed to Cyprus, equipped with Ferret Scout Cars, to serve as the resident armoured car squadron.

In January 1986, the regiment once again deployed to Germany, where it was assigned to 20th Armoured Brigade and stationed at Lothian Barracks, Detmold. The regiment was also transitioned back to Chieftain Main Battle Tank at this time. From here, G Squadron were deployed to Cyprus under the command of 4th/7th Royal Dragoon Guards, between June and December 1988. Another Squadron deployment to Cyprus followed between December 1991 and June 1992.

As part of the post-Cold War defence reforms, the regiment was amalgamated with the 13th/18th Royal Hussars to form the Light Dragoons on 1 December 1992.

== Regimental museum ==
The regimental collection is held by the Discovery Museum in Newcastle upon Tyne.

== Battle honours ==
The regiment's battle honours were those of its predecessor regiments plus:

- The Second World War: Withdrawal to Escaut, Seine 1944, Hechtel, Nederrijn, Venraij, Rhineland, Hochwald, Rhine, Ibbenburen, Aller, North-West Europe 1940 '44-45

== Commanding Officers ==
The Commanding Officers have been:

- 1959–1961: Lt.-Col. J. Michael Barton
- 1961–1963: Lt.-Col. A. George Lewis
- 1963–1965: Lt.-Col. Peter Hodgson
- 1965–1968: Lt.-Col. John R.D. Sharpe
- 1968–1970: Lt.-Col. John C.F. Inglis
- 1970–1973: Lt.-Col. J. Simon F. Murray
- 1973–1976: Lt.-Col. Richard A. Coxwell-Rogers
- 1976–1978: Lt.-Col. Rupert H.G. McCarthy
- 1978–1980: Lt.-Col. C. Anthony G. Wells
- 1980–1983: Lt.-Col. James S. Knox
- 1983–1985: Lt.-Col. Peter V. Hervey
- 1985–1988: Lt.-Col. D. Stewart Balmain
- 1988–1991: Lt.-Col. Tresham D. Gregg
- 1991–1992: Lt.-Col. Christopher H. Braithwaite

== Colonels-in-Chief ==
- 1922 Queen Alexandra
- 1958 The Princess Margaret, Countess of Snowdon, CI, GCVO

== Regimental Colonels ==
Colonels of the Regiment were:

- 1922–1931: Gen. Sir William Eliot Peyton, KCB, KCVO, DSO ( ex 15th Hussars)
- 1922–1925: F.M. Sir John Denton Pinkstone French, 1st Earl of Ypres, KP, GCB, OM, GCVO, KCMG (ex 19th Hussars)
- 1931–1944: Brig-Gen. Anthony Courage, DSO, MC
- 1944–1947: F.M. Sir Philip Walhouse Chetwode, Bt., 1st Baron Chetwode, GCB, OM, GCSI, KCMG, DSO
- 1947–1957: Brig. Sir Henry Robert Kincaid Floyd, Bt., CB, CBE
- 1957–1964: Maj-Gen. Sir William Robert Norris Hinde, KBE, CB, DSO
- 1964–1970: Col. Anthony Donnithorne Taylor, DSO, MC
- 1970–1978: Maj-Gen. Francis Brian Wyldbore-Smith, CB, DSO, OBE
- 1978–1983: Lt-Col. Peter Hodgson
- 1983–1988: Brig. John Rowe Dutton Sharpe, CBE
- 1988–1992: Lt-Col. Richard Annesley Coxwell-Rogers, DL
- 1992: Regiment amalgamated with 13th/18th Royal Hussars (Queen Mary's Own), to form The Light Dragoons

== Notable soldiers ==
The following are notable former members of the regiment:

- Major General Sir Michael Creagh (1892–1970), former General Officer Commanding 7th Armoured Division
- Brigadier Sir Henry Floyd (1899–1968), former Chief-of-Staff of the Eighth Army
- Major Ian Gow (1937–1990), former Treasury Minister assassinated by the IRA
- Brigader Viscount Head (1906–1983), former Secretary of State for War
- Colonel Sir Walter Luttrell (1919–2007), former Lord Lieutenant of Somerset
- Captain Gerald Maitland-Carew (born 1941), current Lord Lieutenant of Roxburgh, Ettrick and Lauderdale
- Lieutenant General Simon Mayall (born 1956), former Deputy Chief of the Defence Staff
- Captain Lord Peyton (1919–2006), former Minister of Transport
- Captain Harry Woolf, Baron Woolf (born 1933), former Lord Chief Justice of England and Wales

== Sources ==
- Joslen, H. F. (2003) [1960]. Orders of Battle: Second World War, 1939–1945. Uckfield, East Sussex: Naval and Military Press. ISBN 978-1-84342-474-1.
