= Queen's Own Yeomanry =

- Cap badge
- Active: 1971–present
- Allegiance: United Kingdom
- Branch: British Army
- Type: Yeomanry
- Role: Light cavalry
- Size: Regiment; 368 personnel
- Part of: Royal Armoured Corps
- Garrison/HQ: Regimental Headquarters - Fenham Barracks, Newcastle upon Tyne; A Squadron - York; B Squadron - Wigan; C Squadron - Chester; D Squadron - Newcastle
- Colours: Prussian Blue & Cavalry Gold
- March: D'ye Ken John Peel

Commanders
- Commanding Officer: Lt Col Charles Mackain-Bremner
- Royal Honorary Colonel: Sophie, Duchess of Edinburgh
- Honorary Colonel: Major-General S. J. M. Graham, CB, VD

Insignia
- Tactical Recognition Flash

The Queen's Own Yeomanry (QOY) is a reserve light cavalry reconnaissance regiment of the British Army. The regiment is part of the 19th Brigade, which was reactivated in 2022. The regimental headquarters is at Fenham Barracks, Newcastle, with squadrons in York, Wigan, Chester and Newcastle.

== History ==
The Queens Own Yeomanry was initially formed on 1 April 1971 as the 2nd Armoured Car Regiment from five of the Yeomanry units across the North and Middle of England and South West Scotland. During the Cold War The Queen's Own Yeomanry was a British Army of the Rhine Regiment with an Armoured Reconnaissance role in Germany. With the Strategic Defence Review in 1999 the geographical locations of the regiment changed to encompass East Scotland and Northern Ireland. Soldiers from the regiment have served both in Iraq and Afghanistan.

Under Army 2020, three squadrons transferred to the Scottish and North Irish Yeomanry and it gained two squadrons from the Royal Mercian and Lancastrian Yeomanry. The unit is paired with the Light Dragoons and uses the Jackal.

== Recruitment ==
The regiment recruits its soldiers mainly from the following counties: Yorkshire, Tyne and Wear, County Durham, Lancashire, Cheshire, Northumberland and Merseyside.

== Organisation ==
The Queen's Own Yeomanry is part of the Royal Armoured Corps and consists of four squadrons:

- A (Yorkshire Yeomanry) Squadron
- B (The Duke of Lancaster's Own Yeomanry) Squadron
- C (Cheshire Yeomanry (The Earl of Chester's)) Squadron
- D (Northumberland Hussars) Squadron

The regiment is under the command of 19th Brigade, within 1st (UK) Division, and is paired with the Light Dragoons, both operating the Jackal vehicle.

== Order of precedence ==
For the purposes of parading, the Regiments of the British Army are listed according to an order of precedence. This is the order in which the various corps of the army parade, from right to left, with the unit at the extreme right being the most senior.

Preceded by Royal Wessex Yeomanry	British Army; Order of Precedence	Succeeded by Scottish & North Irish Yeomanry

== Guidon ==
QOY Guidon with Guard of Honour for TA 100 Celebrations

The Guidon, which is awarded by The Queen, is a flag of crimson silk damask embroidered and fringed with gold with the Regimental Battle Honours emblazoned upon it and the Regimental emblem embroidered in the centre. On 22 September 2007 Prince Charles, in his capacity as Royal Honorary Colonel of The Queen's Own Yeomanry, presented a new Guidon to the Regiment in an hour-long ceremony in the grounds of Alnwick Castle. This was the first Guidon the QOY has received since its formation.

== Armoured Vehicles ==
In late 2013, with the phasing out of CVR(T) across the British Army, the regiment was re-equipped with the Land Rover Defender-based RWMIK, a light armoured vehicle, equipped with the General Purpose Machine Gun (GPMG) and the Browning .50 Heavy Machine Gun (HMG), as well as individual BOWMAN digital battlefield communications systems and specialised surveillance optics, including thermal imaging. In 2018 the regiment re-equipped with Jackal 1's to harmonise vehicles with its sister regiment, The Light Dragoons.

== Uniform ==
=== Badges ===
The whole Regiment wears a variation of the running fox cap badge of the old East Riding Yeomanry. However, each of the Squadrons wears its own collar badges and buttons.

=== Stable Belt and Shoulder Flash ===
The Regimental Stable Belt or shoulder flashes are worn to show a soldier or officer is serving with the QOY in various forms of dress. The colour of both is Prussian blue with two horizontal stripes of cavalry gold (yellow):

== Lineage ==
1908 Haldane Reforms	1956 Post-War Mergers	1966 Defence White Paper	1990 Options for Change	1999 Strategic Defence Review	2015 Army 2020
Yorkshire Hussars (Alexandra, Princess of Wales's Own)	Queen's Own Yorkshire Yeomanry	Y Squadron, Queen's Own Yeomanry			A Squadron, Queen's Own Yeomanry
Queen's Own Yorkshire Dragoons	Queen's Own Yorkshire Yeomanry	Y Squadron, Queen's Own Yeomanry			A Squadron, Queen's Own Yeomanry
East Riding of Yorkshire Yeomanry	Queen's Own Yorkshire Yeomanry	Y Squadron, Queen's Own Yeomanry			A Squadron, Queen's Own Yeomanry
Duke of Lancaster's Own Yeomanry			D Squadron, Royal Mercian and Lancastrian Yeomanry		B Squadron, Queen's Own Yeomanry
Cheshire Yeomanry (Earl of Chester's)		C Squadron, Queen's Own Yeomanry		C Squadron, Royal Mercian and Lancastrian Yeomanry	C Squadron, Queen's Own Yeomanry
Northumberland Hussars		HQ Squadron, Queen's Own Yeomanry	D Squadron, Queen's Own Yeomanry		C&S Squadron, Queen's Own Yeomanry

== Freedoms ==
The regiment has received the Freedom of several locations throughout its history; these include:

- (England) 1971: Newcastle upon Tyne (Originally Granted to the Northumberland Hussars on 8 January 1969).
- (England) 3 December 2009: York.
- (Scotland) 3 May 2014: South Ayrshire.
- (England) 12 October 2019: On 12 October 2019, C (The Duke of Chester's Cheshire Hussars (Yeomanry)) Squadron was granted the freedom of the city of Chester following the 225th anniversary of the yeomanry and 80th anniversary of the Royal Armoured Corps. The squadron was last awarded the honour in 1996 and their bi-centenary in 1997.
