= Fenham Barracks =

Military installation in Newcastle upon Tyne, England

- Newcastle upon Tyne
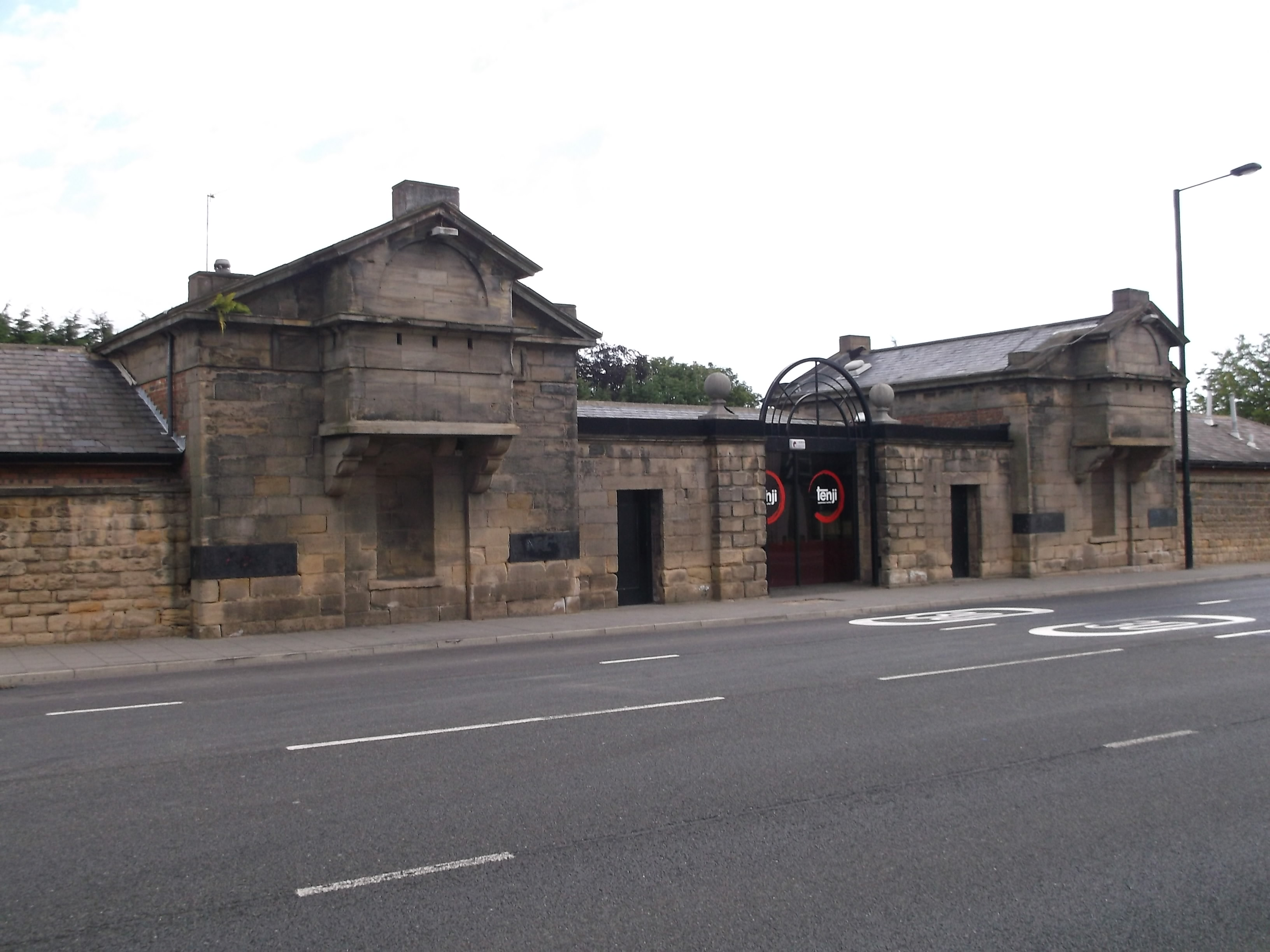
- Former guard houses and entrance of Fenham Barracks

Site information
- Type: Barracks
- Owner: Ministry of Defence
- Operator: British Army

Location
- Location within Tyne and Wear
- Coordinates: 54°58′47″N 01°37′53″W

Site history
- Built: 1804–1806
- Built for: War Office
- In use: 1806–Present

Garrison information
- Occupants: D Squadron and Regimental Headquarters Queen's Own Yeomanry; 201 Hospital Squadron, 214 (NE) MMR

Fenham Barracks is an Army Reserve installation on Barrack Road, Newcastle upon Tyne, Tyne and Wear, England.

== History ==
The site was acquired by the War Office from Newcastle Corporation in 1804 and, following the construction of three barrack blocks, became the home of units of the 6th (Inniskilling) Dragoons under the name of Newcastle Barracks in 1806. The officers' mess, designed by James Wyatt, was completed around the same time. Soldiers' duties included putting down the Chartism movement riots in the 1840s. In 1846 units of the Royal Horse Artillery arrived and in 1873 a system of recruiting areas based on counties was instituted under the Cardwell Reforms and the barracks became the depot for the two battalions of the 5th (Northumberland Fusiliers) Regiment of Foot. Following the Childers Reforms, the 5th Regiment of Foot evolved to become the Northumberland Fusiliers with its depot at the barracks in 1881 and the Durham Light Infantry arrived from Sunderland Barracks in 1884.

The Durham Light Infantry museum opened at Fenham Barracks shortly after the First World War but moved out to Brancepeth Castle when the regiment transferred there in 1939. The Royal Northumberland Fusiliers museum opened at Fenham Barracks in 1929 and remained there after the Royal Northumberland Fusiliers were absorbed into the Royal Regiment of Fusiliers in 1962. The museum finally moved out to Alnwick Castle in 1970.

The majority of the Georgian barracks buildings were demolished in the 1970s and replaced with new buildings (those that remained were sold off twenty years later and now serve as student residences). In 1975 the barracks became the home of 15th/19th The King's Royal Hussars; they moved out in 1992 when the regiment was amalgamated to form part of the Light Dragoons.

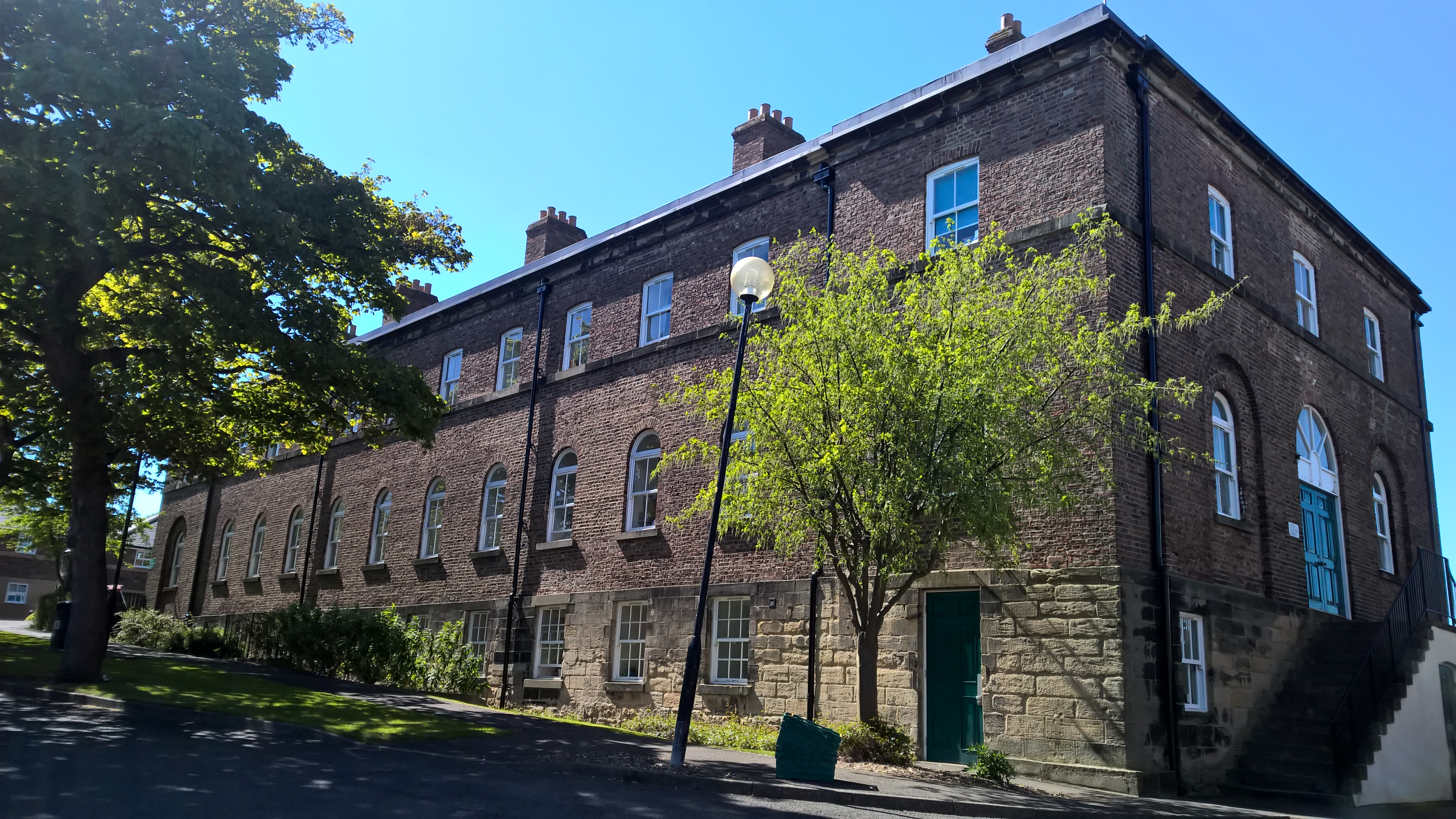
Former officers' quarters (later sergeants' mess), now used for student accommodation.

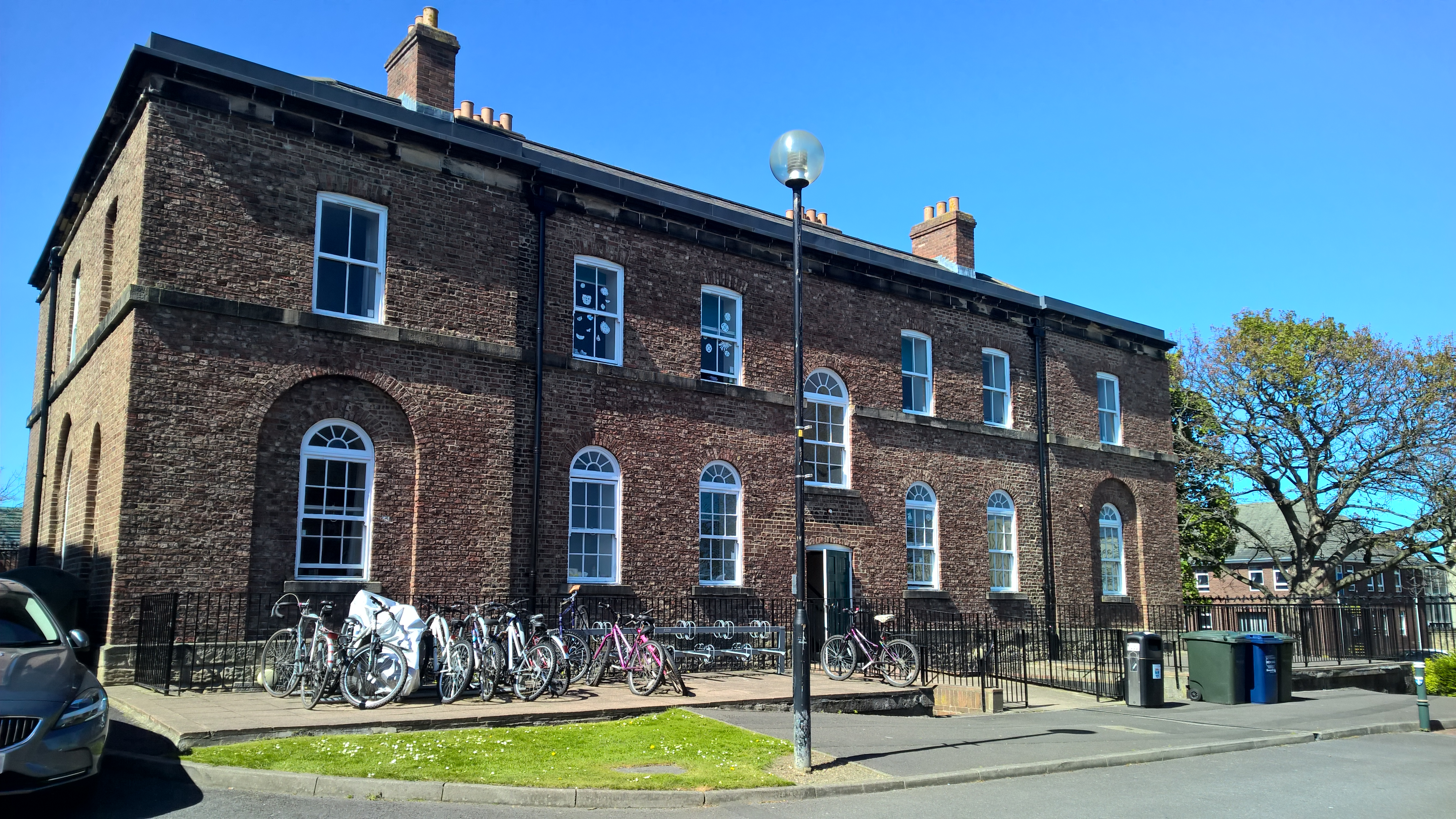
Former officers' mess, now used for student accommodation.

== Based units ==
The following units are based at Fenham Barracks.

- 214 (North East) Multi-Role Medical Regiment
  - 201 Hospital Squadron
- The Queen's Own Yeomanry
  - Regimental Headquarters
  - D Squadron
