= Osnabrück Garrison =

Major British garrison in Germany

Location of Osnabrück in Lower Saxony

Osnabrück Garrison was a major British garrison with facilities located at Osnabrück in Lower Saxony and Münster in North Rhine-Westphalia, Germany. It was home to 4th Armoured Brigade and most of its subordinate units. It formed a major part of British Forces Germany.

== History ==
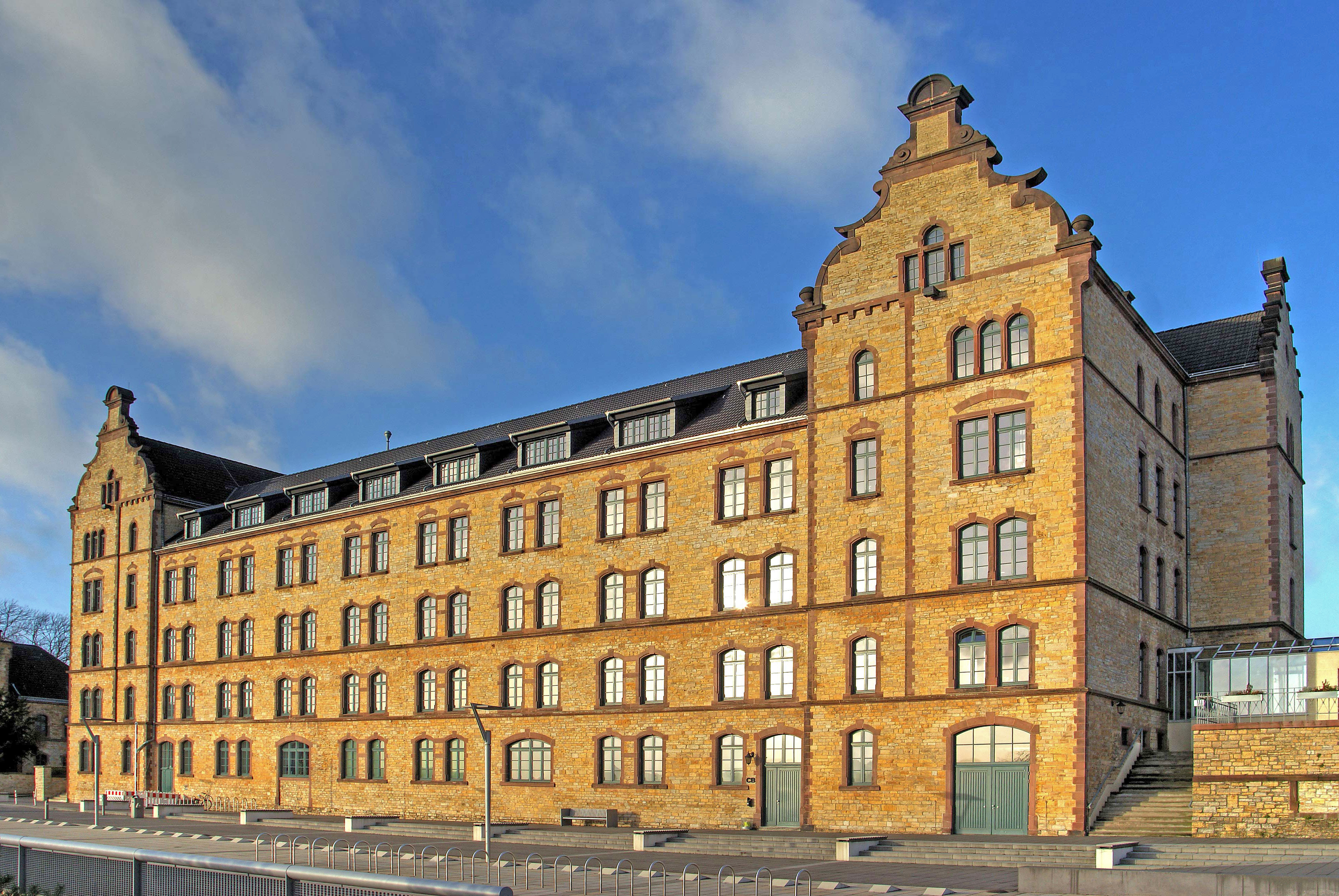
Scarborough Barracks (built in 1899 as Caprivi Kaserne after General Leo von Caprivi and now used as the University of Applied Sciences)

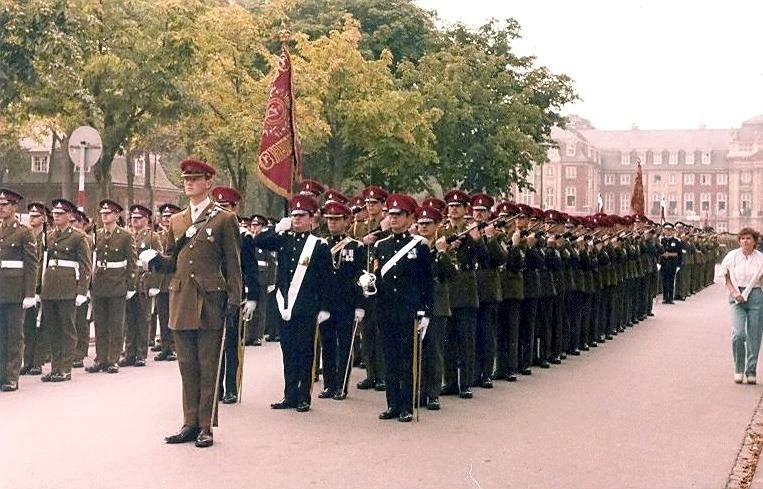
The Queen's Royal Irish Hussars, who were based at York Barracks, presenting their guidon party and honour guard during the Freedom of Münster parade, 1983

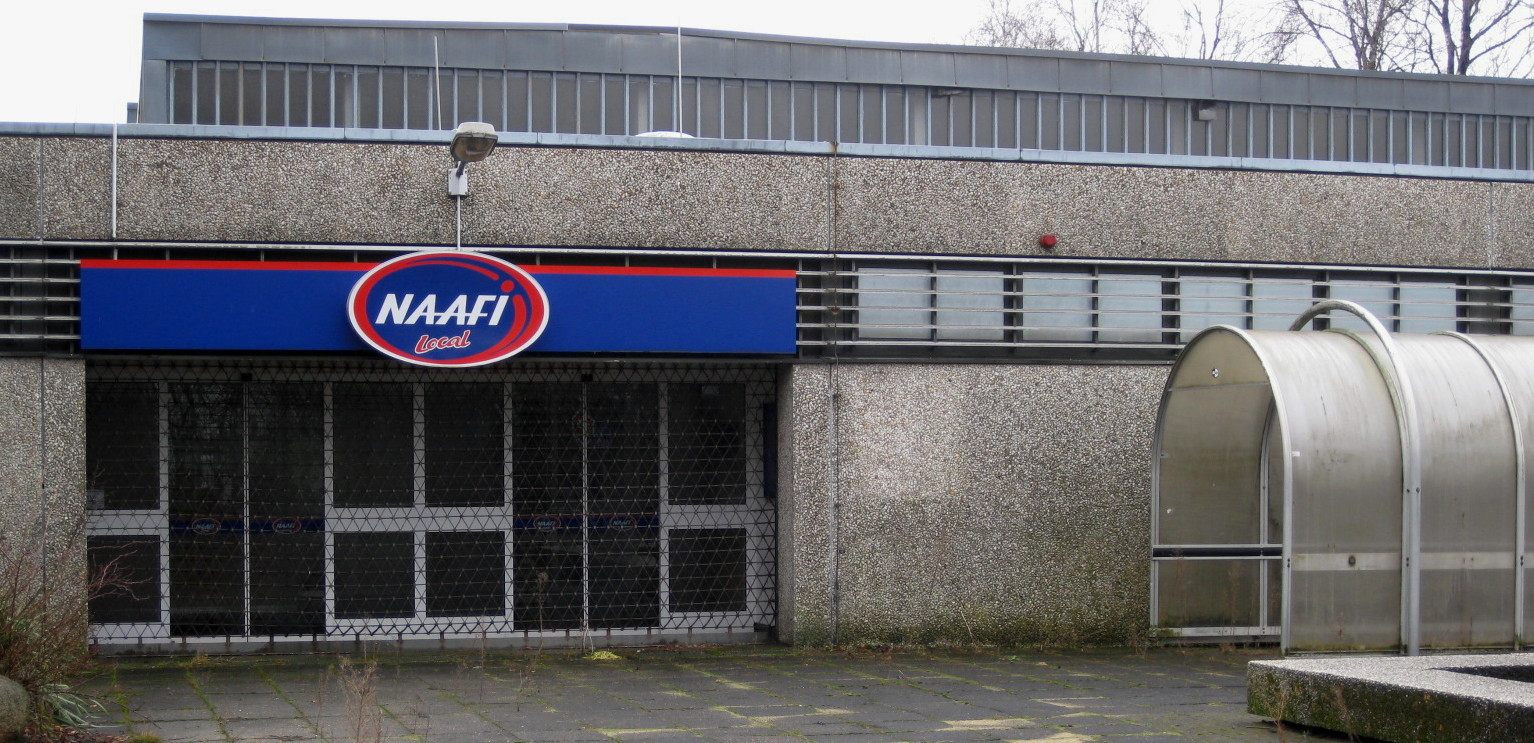
The NAAFI building at Osnabrück Garrison

The oldest part of Osnabrück Station was Caprivi Kaserne (named after General Leo von Caprivi), dating back to 1899; this became Scarborough Barracks after the Second World War and is now being used as the University of Applied Sciences. Scharnhorst Kaserne (named after General Gerhard von Scharnhorst) was built in the 1930s; this went on after the War to be Belfast Barracks and is now being used as the Osnabrück Innovations Centre. Meanwhile, Winkelhausen Kaserne (named after Colonel Willy Carl Winkelhausen) was also built in the 1930s; this went on after the War to become Roberts Barracks and is now being used as a freight hub.

Am Limberg Kaserne (named after the height Limberg) was built during the War in Osnabrück as an ammunition factory for the Wehrmacht; this was expanded under British administration in the early 1950s to become Imphal Barracks (for cavalry and tank regiments) and Mercer Barracks (for infantry regiments) and later redeveloped for housing. The site on Landwehrstraße, which was occupied by the British Army as Quebec Barracks in the 1950s, was also redeveloped for housing.

Loddenheide Kaserne (Loddenheide being a part of the Gremmendorf district of Münster) was built in the 1930s; this expanded after the war and was broken up into Buller Barracks, Swinton Barracks, Waterloo Barracks and York Barracks. Its later use became the subject of a local planning consultation. Meanwhile, Hermann Göring Kaserne (named after Reich Marshal Hermann Göring) evolved to become Oxford Barracks after the War. The garrison became the largest British military base outside the UK. It was the target of the Osnabrück mortar attack on 28 June 1996 when Quebec Barracks were hit by three Mark 15 mortar devices. The barracks closed in 2009.

== Locations ==
Locations within the garrison area included:
Osnabrück Station:

- Belfast Barracks, named after the City of Belfast, having served as an infantry barracks since 1951, was home to 1st Battalion the Duke of Lancaster's Regiment from 2006 until it closed in 2009.
- Imphal Barracks, named after the Battle of Imphal in 1944, having served as a cavalry and tank regiment barracks since 1952, was home to the 1st The Queen's Dragoon Guards from 2003 until it closed in 2007.
- Mercer Barracks, probably named after Captain Cavalié Mercer, having served as an infantry barracks since the 1952, was home to 1st Battalion the Royal Green Jackets from 1987 until it closed in 1992.
- Quebec Barracks, named after the City of Quebec, having served as an infantry barracks since the 1950s, was home of 12th Mechanised Brigade during the 1980s and was then home to 4th Armoured Brigade from 1993 until it closed in 2009. It was also home to 21 Engineer Regiment from 1996 until it closed in 2009.
- Roberts Barracks, named after Field Marshal Earl Roberts, having served as an artillery and engineer barracks since 1951, was home to 4th Regiment Royal Artillery from 1984 until it closed in 2008.
- Scarborough Barracks, named after the town of Scarborough, having served as an ordnance park and as a signals barracks since the early 1960s, was home 12 Ordnance Company of the Royal Army Ordnance Corps until it closed in 1987.

Münster Station:

- Buller Barracks, named after General Sir Redvers Buller, having served as a Royal Army Service Corps barracks since 1956 and then as an infantry barracks from 1968, was home to 1st Battalion The Queen's Own Highlanders from 1988 until it closed in 1994.
- Oxford Barracks, named after the City of Oxford, having served as an infantry barracks since 1945, was home to 1st Battalion the Yorkshire Regiment from 2008 until it closed in 2009.
- Portsmouth Barracks, named after the City of Portsmouth, was home to 8 Artillery Support Regiment Royal Corps of Transport and 31 Ordnance Company, part of 3 Ordnance Battalion, Royal Army Ordnance Corps from 1968 and the 1980s respectively until it closed in 1994.
- Prestatyn Barracks, named after the North Wales town of Prestatyn, was home to 7 Field Ambulance, RAMC during the 1950s and 1960s.
- Swinton Barracks, named after Major-General Ernest Swinton, having served as a cavalry and tank regiment barracks since 1952, was home to the Royal Hussars from 1990 until it closed in 1992.
- Waterloo Barracks, named after the Battle of Waterloo, having served as an artillery barracks since 1952 and then as in infantry barracks from 1962, was home to 2nd Regiment Royal Artillery from 1982 until it closed in 1993.
- York Barracks, named after the City of York, was home to 20th Armoured Brigade during the 1950s, home to 6th Infantry Brigade during the 1960s, then home to 4th (Guards) Armoured Brigade during the 1970s, and home to 4th Armoured Brigade from 1981 until 1993. It was also home to the Royal Dragoon Guards from 2001 until it closed in 2008.

== See also ==
- Westfalen Garrison
- Bergen-Hohne Garrison
