= Roddy Cordy-Simpson =

British Army general

Lieutenant General Sir Roddy Cordy-Simpson KBE CB DL
- Born: 29 February 1944 (age 82)
- Military career
- Allegiance: United Kingdom
- Branch: British Army
- Service years: 1966–present
- Rank: Lieutenant General
- Commands: 1st (UK) Armoured Division
- Conflicts: Bosnian War
- Awards: Knight Commander of the Order of the British Empire; Companion of the Order of the Bath

Lieutenant General Sir Roderick Alexander Cordy-Simpson, KBE, CB, DL (born 29 February 1944) is a retired British Army officer.

== Military career ==
Educated at Radley College, Roddy Cordy-Simpson was commissioned into the 13th/18th Hussars in February 1966. He was deployed to Bosnia as chief of staff of the United Nations Protection Force in 1992, for which he was appointed a Companion of the Order of the Bath in June 1993, and became General Officer Commanding 1st (UK) Armoured Division in 1994. He was deployed to Bosnia again in December 1996, as Deputy Force Commander Operations for the Stabilisation Force (SFOR). He was appointed a Knight Commander of the Order of the British Empire in the 1998 New Year Honours.

In March 2001 Cordy-Simpson was appointed Lieutenant of the Tower of London, leaving that role in March 2004. Having settled at Bishopstrow in Wiltshire, he was appointed a Deputy Lieutenant of Wiltshire in 2004. He was Vice Lord Lieutenant of Wiltshire from 2016 to 2019.

Military offices
Preceded by Anthony Denison-Smith	General Officer Commanding 1st (UK) Armoured Division; 1994–1996	Succeeded by John Kiszely
