= Jackal (vehicle) =

MWMIK (Jackal)
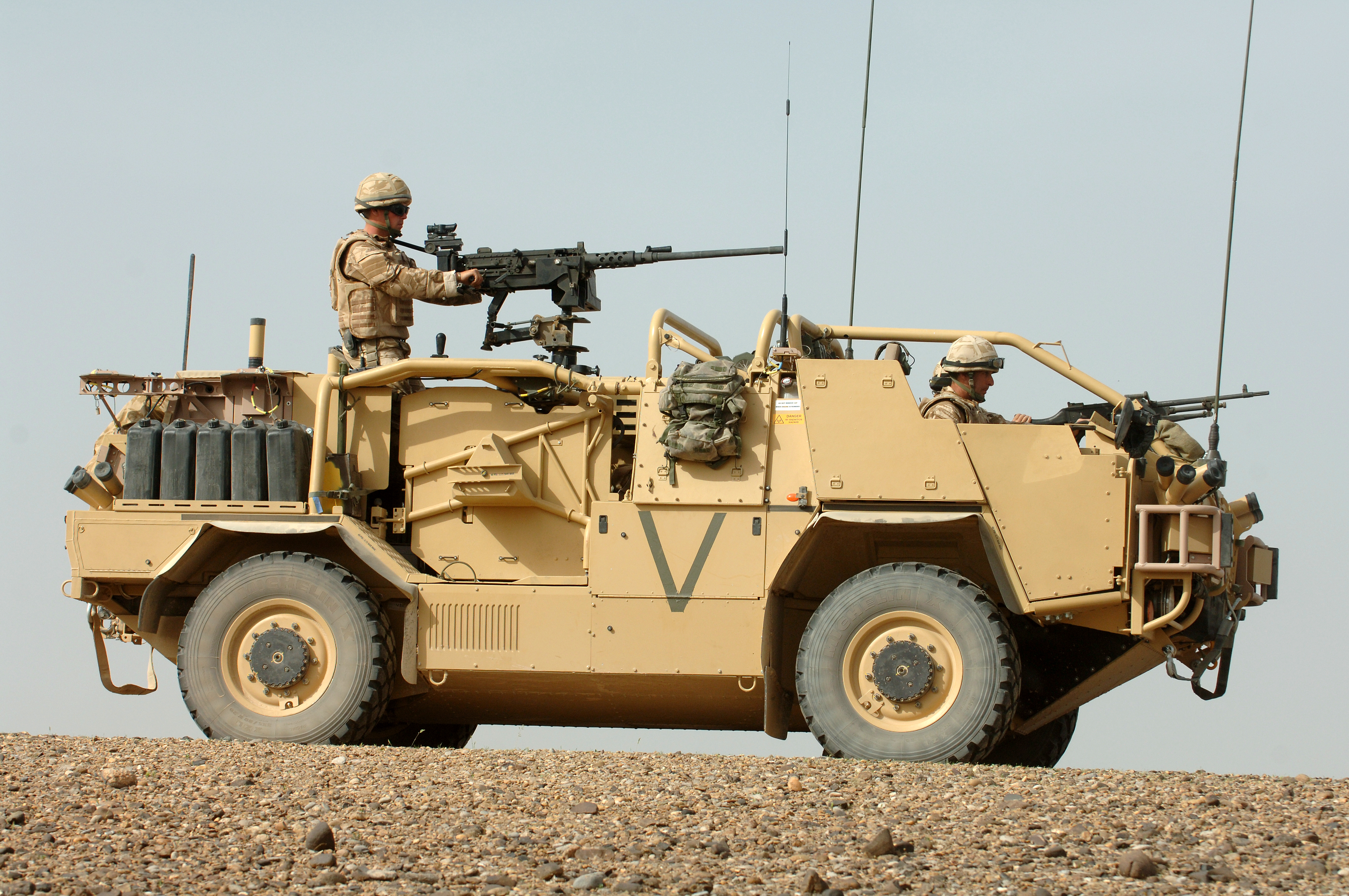
- A Jackal armoured vehicle at Camp Bastion, Afghanistan
- Type: Armoured Wheeled Vehicle
- Place of origin: United Kingdom

Production history
- Designer: Supacat

Specifications
- Mass: 6,650 kg (14,660 lb)
- Length: 5.39 m (17 ft 8 in)
- Width: 2.00 m (6 ft 7 in)
- Height: 1.97 m (6 ft 6 in) (not including weapon system)
- Crew: 3
- Armour: Additional composite armour kit
- Main armament: 12.7 mm heavy machine gun, or Heckler & Koch GMG
- Secondary armament: 7.62 mm general purpose machine gun
- Engine: 5.9 litre Cummins ISBe Euro3 six-cylinder diesel 185 bhp (138 kW)
- Suspension: Independent double wishbone, air operated springs and external bypass shock absorbers (2 per wheel station) with variable ride height
- Maximum speed: 130 km/h (81 mph)

The Jackal or MWMIK (Note: pronounced EmWimmick) (from "Mobility Weapon-Mounted Installation Kit") is a family of vehicles designed and developed by Supacat Ltd (Note: Supacat re-branded to SC Group in September 2015, the Supacat brand retained for the group's core defence business.) at their factory in Honiton, Devon, UK, for use by the British Army and Royal Air Force Regiment.

The primary role of the vehicle in the British Army is deep battlespace reconnaissance, rapid assault and fire support - roles where mobility, endurance and manoeuvrability are important - and it has also been used for convoy protection.

Small production runs are manufactured at the Honiton factory but larger batches are manufactured by DML (part of Babcock Marine Services, owned by Babcock International Group) in Plymouth. The initial order was for up to 100 and it was announced on 27 June 2008 that the MOD would be ordering a further 72. On 23 Jun 2010 it was announced by the Ministry of Defence that 140 additional Jackal 2 vehicles were being ordered, and this would bring the number of Jackals in service up to 500.

The MWMIK can carry increased payload and fuel compared to its predecessor, allowing it to carry greater amounts of additional equipment and protection over longer distances, and it is able to support itself and its crew for distances of over 500 mi (800 km).

== Design and development ==
The vehicle was procured to provide British forces in Afghanistan with an off-road patrol and fire-support vehicle with increased performance, supplementing the Land Rover Wolf WMIK and the Snatch Land Rover which previously fulfilled the role. In particular the Snatch Land Rover, although able to withstand small arms fire, is vulnerable to improvised explosive devices and was labelled by some a "mobile coffin".

According to the Ministry of Defence, the Jackal "was built to meet the British Army's specific requirements for an agile, well-armed, light patrol vehicle." The vehicle's height-adjustable air suspension system can be lowered onto the bump-stops to provide a stable firing platform when stationary or raised to a maximum 380 mm (15 in) ground clearance allowing it to clear large obstacles. The high levels of off-road mobility enable troops to avoid more conventional routes which may be subject to ambush or enemy reconnaissance.

The vehicle is based on the HMT (High Mobility Transporter) 400 high-mobility 4×4 design developed by a former subsidiary of Supacat, now built under licence from Lockheed Martin. The chassis is built by Universal Engineering Ltd, the engine by Cummins, the transmission by Allison, the suspension shock absorbers by Fox Racing Shox and the electronics package by Fujitsu and Smartgauge Electronics. The blast and ballistic armour packages, and the blast mitigating seating were designed and built by Jankel Armouring Ltd. The vehicles can be fitted with a range of weapons, such as a 12.7 mm heavy machine gun, 7.62 mm general purpose machine gun (GPMG) and 40 mm automatic grenade launcher.

The Jackal is capable of maintaining off-road speeds of up to 49 mph (79 km/h) and can reach a top speed of 80 mph (130 km/h).

The Ministry of Defence has stated that the design of the vehicle hull incorporates the latest armour protection and that it is considered to be among the best in the world. The HMT 400 mine blast and ballistic protection system was developed for Supacat by Jankel Armouring Ltd. It features armour plating beneath the crew compartment and on the vehicle sides, as well as attenuating seats that absorb shock from a mine blast. The top of the cabin is left open for visibility, which affords the vehicle protection through its manoeuvrability and main armament stand-off distance. These enable it to avoid exposure to riskier IED prone routes. Despite this Jackal crews have suffered a number of IED attacks, some fatal.

== Operational history ==
=== United Kingdom ===
==== War in Afghanistan ====
Jackal made its operational debut in Operation Herrick, part of the War in Afghanistan, on 8 April 2008 when it was deployed by the British Army's 16 Air Assault Brigade and the Royal Marines 3 Commando Brigade. The vehicle was praised for its off-road performance, with some users likening it to a "dune buggy". The vehicle was also initially praised for its protection; in September 2009, a Royal Marine survived a direct mine explosion whilst in one of the vehicles. By August 2009, however, a total of 13 British soldiers had been killed whilst in the vehicle. This resulted in widespread criticism, with some media outlets calling the vehicle a "deathtrap". Despite not being impervious to IEDs, Jackal remained one of the most favoured patrol vehicles for British troops, according to Defence Minister Quentin Davies. The MOD ordered 110 upgraded models, named the Jackal 2, along with 70 Coyotes, in April 2009 and they were in service from July 2009.

The vehicles were also used by the RAF Regiment; during the September 2012 raid on Camp Bastion, a Taliban RPG struck a Jackal, which wounded its crew. One crew member, Sergeant Geddes, continued to rally his team to defend their position, an action for which he later received the Military Cross.

==== Post-War in Afghanistan ====
Despite being procured for the War in Afghanistan, the vehicle has remained in service with the British Army. Following the Army 2020 restructuring, the vehicle now equips three light cavalry regiments and is used primarily for light reconnaissance. It has been deployed in this role with the Light Dragoons in Poland since 2016, in support of NATO's Enhanced Forward Presence. In 2021, the Light Dragoons and 1st The Queen's Dragoon Guards deployed with the vehicle to Mali as part of the Long Range Reconnaissance Group in support of Operation Newcombe.

In 2020, the Ministry of Defence loaned four Jackal 2 vehicles to the Estonian Defence Forces for their special forces to use in Mali until March 2021 or until they receive their order of Coyote vehicles.

== Variants ==
=== Jackal 2 ===
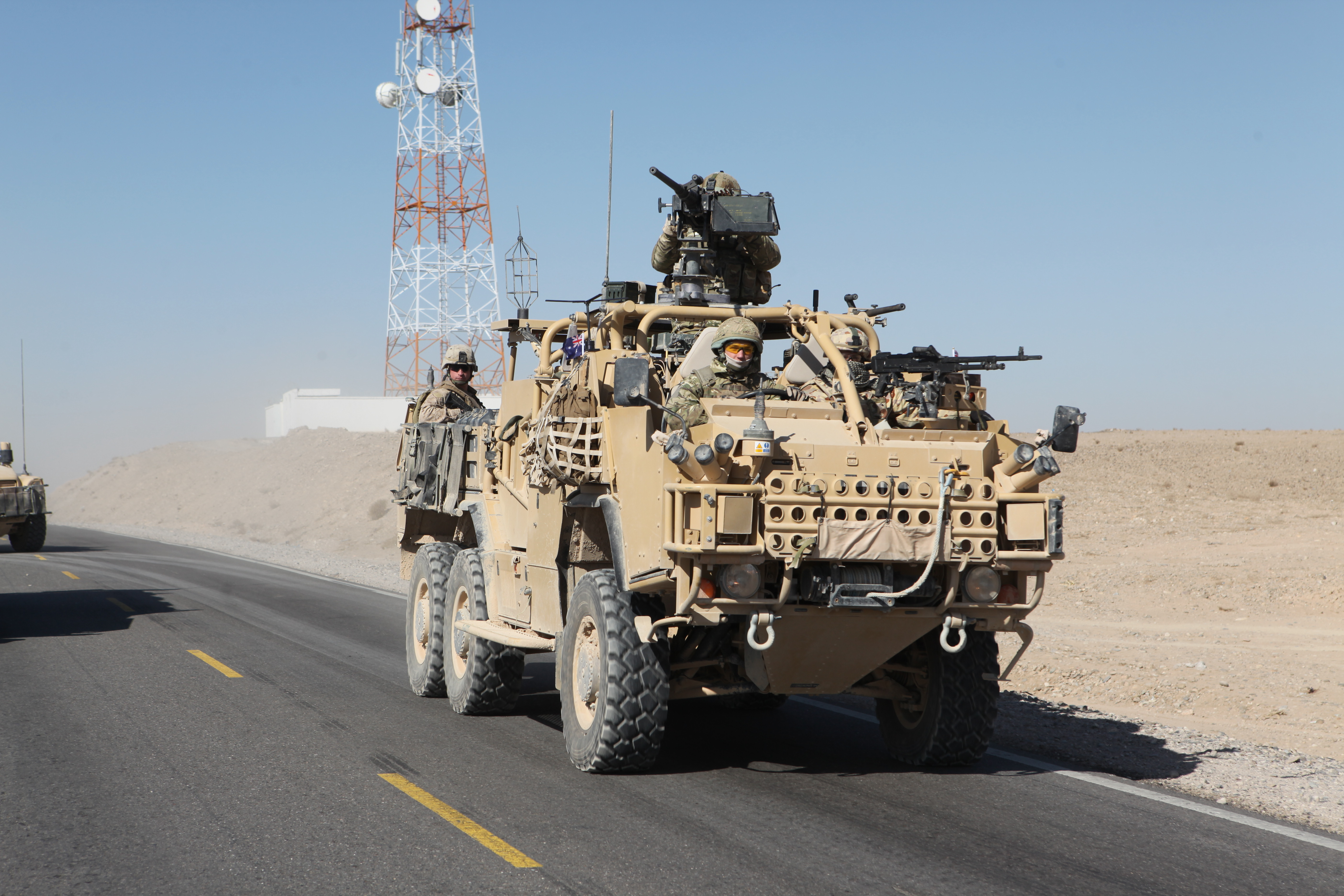
Coyote TSV with British, Australian and American personnel aboard in Afghanistan, 2011

An updated version of the Jackal has been ordered as Jackal 2. The crew has been increased to four and the main armament gun ring moved forward to give it an all round arc of fire. The chassis has been upgraded, allowing the vehicle to carry a greater payload and armour, and providing more strength for protection against roadside bombs. It also has a larger 6.7 L engine, although this does not increase the speed of the vehicle. An initial order for "around 110" vehicles was made in 2009, with final deliveries in February 2010. A further order for 140 of the Jackal 2A was announced on 23 June 2010, which is based on the Jackal 2 platform with a blast protection upgrade.

=== Jackal 3 ===
The latest iteration of the Jackal platform is the Jackal 3, introduced in the summer of 2024. This is based on Supacat's new HMT Extenda Mk3 platform, which allows for the vehicle to be converted between 4x4 and 6x6 versions through the additional of a drop-in third axle. In February 2024, the British Army placed an order for 70 Jackal 3s in the 4x4 configuration. This was followed by a further order for another 53 units equipped with the 6x6 Extenda module in September the same year, bring the total order volume to 123. The bulk of these vehicles (115) were built at Babcock's new factory in Devonport, with the other 8 assembled at Supacat's Dunkeswell facility.

On 13 July 2026, the last Jackal 3 Extenda was manufactured and supplied to the British military.

=== Coyote ===
Coyote Tactical Support Vehicles are a larger 6×6 design with more than 70 ordered as medium load carriers, artillery tractors and a range of other platform variants.

The Coyote tactical support vehicle (TSV light) is based on the HMT 600 6×6 chassis from Supacat and is a larger derivative of the Jackal 2, the two vehicles are designed to be complementary. The extra two wheels give a heavier vehicle approaching 10,500 kg (10.3 long tons; 10.5 t) which will act in support of the Jackal 2 and allow transport of supplies and equipment over similar terrain [the payload for supplies and equipment will be 3,900 kg (3.8 long tons; 3.9 t)]. The Coyote has been designed to fulfil the role of a light tactical service vehicle.

== Operators ==
=== Current operators ===
United Kingdom

The United Kingdom ordered 100 vehicles initially, followed by a further 72 in 2008 and 140 in 2010.

In February 2023, the UK placed an order with Supacat for 70 Extenda Mk3 vehicles to be known as the Jackal 3 and has the option of acquiring a total of 240 of the vehicles.

- British Army – as at 1 April 2025, 480 Jackals and 72 Coyotes were in service. In June 2026, the Minister of State for Defence Readiness and Industry Luke Pollard said in response to a question on how many Jackal 3(E) had been delivered that 639 Jackals were in service in the British Army.
- Royal Air Force – unknown number in service with the RAF Regiment.
- Royal Marines – as of June 2026, 61 Jackals were in service.

=== Former operators ===
Estonia

- Estonian Special Operations Force – four vehicles loaned from the United Kingdom for use in Mali.
