= Warminster Garrison =

Military installation in Wiltshire, England

Headquarters, Warminster Garrison
- Warminster
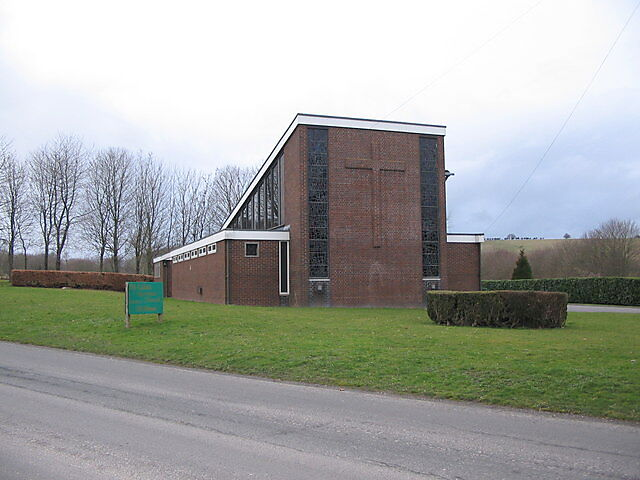
- St. Giles Garrison Church

Site information
- Type: Garrison
- Owner: Ministry of Defence
- Operator: British Army

Location
- Location within Wiltshire
- Coordinates: 51.212°N 2.160°W

Site history
- In use: 1993–present

Warminster Garrison is a military garrison of the British Army, on the edge of Salisbury Plain in Wiltshire, England.

== History ==
The history of Warminster's military garrison can be traced back to Roman Britain, where a small camp was located on the side of the current Battlesbury Barracks (part of the garrison). However, following Options for Change announced following the Dissolution of the Soviet Union and subsequent end of the Cold War, Headquarters, Combined Arms Training Centre (CATC) located in Warminster was dual-headed as Headquarters, Warminster Garrison and Warminster Training Centre on 1 April 1993. This itself formed between a merger of the now defunct Headquarters School of Infantry and the Barracks, Warminster (today known as Battlesbury Barracks). All three of these elements merged into the Warminster Training Centre (WTC).

On 4 May 1995, as part of the second phase of Options for Change, the Infantry Support Weapons Wing at AAC Netheravon closed and its components moved to WTC as part of the Infantry Training Centre (ITC).

To align its name with its evolving role, CATC was renamed Land Warfare Training Centre in June 2000, which was further refined in 2002 to become Land Warfare Centre (LWC) with HQ Training Support Command (Land) becoming HQ LWC. Thus WTC became known as Land Warfare Centre. Sometime before 2016, LWC was renamed as Waterloo Lines.

== Current occupants ==
The current occupants of the garrison as of April 2021 is as follows:

- Commander, Warminster Garrison – Lieutenant Colonel
- Garrison Sergeant Major – Warrant Officer 1

Waterloo Lines

- Headquarters, Land Warfare Centre
- Headquarters, Infantry
- Headquarters, Defence Training Estate
- Regimental Headquarters, Small Arms School Corps
- Specialist Weapons School
  - Gurkha Company (Tavoleto) – OPFOR role
- Junior Staff Centre (part of Sandhurst Group)
- Combined Arms Tactical Trainer
- Infantry Trials and Development Unit
- Reconnaissance and Armoured Tactics Division (part of The Armour Centre at Bovington Camp)

Battlesbury Barracks

- Headquarters, Strike Experimentation Group
- Royal Dragoon Guards – since November 2020
- Joint Asset Management and Engineering Solutions (JAMES) Delivery Team

Harman Lines

- Falcon Area Surveillance and Reconnaissance Squadron, Royal Tank Regiment (28 Engineer Regiment)
  - Close Support Troop, Royal Engineers (detached from 28 Engineer Regiment, supporting Falcon Squadron)
- Land Warfare Centre Battlegroup Light Aid Detachment, Royal Electrical and Mechanical Engineers
