= Harman Lines =

British Army base in Wiltshire, United Kingdom

- Part of Warminster Garrison
- Warminster, Wiltshire in England
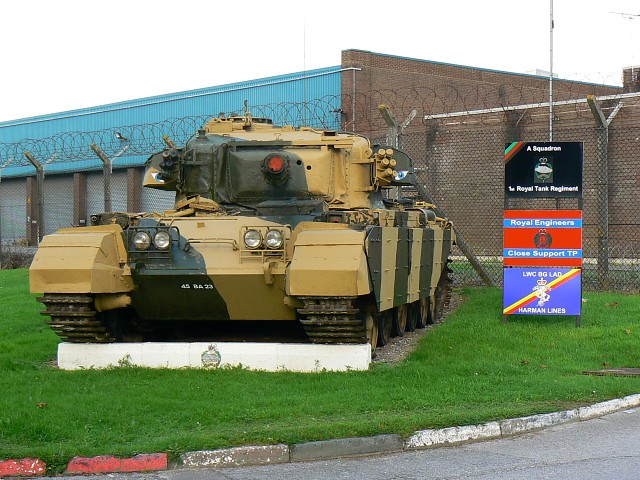
- A tank on display at the entrance to Harman Lines

Site information
- Type: Army barracks
- Owner: Ministry of Defence
- Operator: British Army
- Controlled by: Royal Armoured Corps
- Condition: Operational

Location
- Location within Wiltshire
- Coordinates: 51°13′01.9″N 2°08′41.9″W
- Area: 3 hectares (7.4 acres)

Site history
- Built: 1975
- In use: 1975 – present

Garrison information
- Garrison: Falcon Squadron, Royal Tank Regiment

Harman Lines is a military installation of the British Army, which is part of Warminster Garrison on the Salisbury Plain. Harman Lines is on Sack Road in Warminster, Wiltshire, United Kingdom.

== History ==
In 1965, Warminster saw a large expansion, and the 1966 Defence White Paper expanded its role. The nearby Land Warfare Centre gained a 'Tank Demonstration Squadron', later 'Armoured', which was a detached armoured unit from its regiment. In 1975, the custom-built Harman Lines was opened on Sack Hill.

As part of the 1998 Strategic Defence Review, a new Joint Nuclear, Biological and Chemical Regiment was formed based at RAF Honington and saw the 1st Royal Tank Regiment dispersed. As part of this change, A Squadron moved to Harman Lines as part of the new unit under the Combined Arms Training Centre. The site remained the home of the Armoured Demonstration Squadron until 2014, when it became the permanent home of, Falcon Squadron, RTR, part of the Defence CBRN Wing.

== Current garrison ==
The current garrison includes:

- Falcon Area Surveillance and Reconnaissance Squadron, Royal Tank Regiment (28 Engineer Regiment)
  - Close Support Troop, Royal Engineers (detached from 28 Engineer Regiment, supporting Falcon Squadron)
- Land Warfare Centre Battlegroup Light Aid Detachment, Royal Electrical and Mechanical Engineers

== See also ==
- Warminster Garrison
  - Waterloo Lines
  - Battlesbury Barracks
