= Francis Inglefield =

British Army officer

Major-General Francis Inglefield CB DSO
- Inglefield in 1917
- Born: Francis Seymour Inglefield; 1855; Stoke Damerel, Devon, England
- Died: 1930 (aged 74); Kensington, London, England
- Military career
- Branch: British Army
- Rank: Major-General
- Commands: 12th Infantry Brigade; 54th (East Anglian) Infantry Division
- Conflicts: Second Boer War; First World War
- Awards: Companion of the Order of the Bath; Distinguished Service Order

Major-General Francis Seymour Inglefield CB DSO (1855–1930) was a British Army officer.

== Military career ==
Inglefield was commissioned into the 15th Regiment of Foot as a lieutenant on 13 June 1874. The regiment was re-named the East Yorkshire Regiment in 1881, and he was promoted to captain on 30 June 1884, became a brigade major in September 1888, then major on 2 July 1892.

After the outbreak of the Second Boer War in South Africa in October 1899, he served as a special service officer in the Orange Free State February to May 1900 and in the Transvaal May to August 1900, seeing action several times including at the Battle of Poplar Grove on 7 March 1900 and the Battle of Driefontein in March 1900. He was promoted to lieutenant colonel while in command of the 2nd Battalion of his regiment on 29 April 1900 while in South Africa, and left for home with other officers and men of this battalion in late 1902, after the end of the war. For his service in the war he was twice mentioned in despatches and appointed a Companion of the Distinguished Service Order (DSO).

Promoted to colonel, he became a staff officer with the 5th Division in November 1905 and was appointed a Companion of the Order of the Bath (CB) in the 1908 Birthday Honours. He was then promoted to temporary brigadier general and went on to become commander of the 12th Infantry Brigade in July 1909.

After being raised to the substantive rank of major general in March 1912, he was made general officer commanding (GOC) of the East Anglian Division, a Territorial Force (TF) formation, in June 1913, taking over from Major General Charles Townshend.

He led his division at the landing at Suvla Bay in August 1915 during the Gallipoli campaign of the First World War and on 27 April 1916 gave up command of the division and was employed as a commander. He then retired from the army on 22 March 1918.

He was Major General Coleridge Grove's successor as colonel of the East Yorkshire Regiment from 18 May 1920 until 1925.

Military offices
Preceded by Charles Townshend	GOC 54th (East Anglian) Infantry Division; 1913–1916	Succeeded by Sir Steuart Hare
Honorary titles
Preceded by Sir Coleridge Grove	Colonel of the East Yorkshire Regiment; 1920–1925	Succeeded by Sir Gerald Boyd
