= Nicholas Thomas (British Army officer) =

British Army general

Major General Nicholas Thomas CBE
- Military career
- Allegiance: United Kingdom
- Branch: British Army
- Service years: 1997 – Present
- Rank: Major General
- Service number: 548025
- Unit: 1st The Queen's Dragoon Guards
- Awards: Commander of the Order of the British Empire

Major General Nicholas Thomas CBE is a senior British Army officer who serves as Military Secretary and General Officer, Scotland.

== Military career ==
Thomas was commissioned into the 1st The Queen's Dragoon Guards on 13 December 1997. He became commanding officer of the Allied Rapid Reaction Corps Gurkha Battalion in 2017. He went on to be commander 160th (Welsh) Brigade in 2023 and Military Secretary and General Officer, Scotland in October 2026.

He was appointed a Commander of the Order of the British Empire (CBE) in the 2023 Birthday Honours.

Military offices
Preceded by Robin Lindsay	Military Secretary; 2026–present	Incumbent
Preceded by Robin Lindsay	General Officer Scotland; 2026–present	Incumbent
