= Coleridge Grove =

Major-General Sir Coleridge Grove KCB
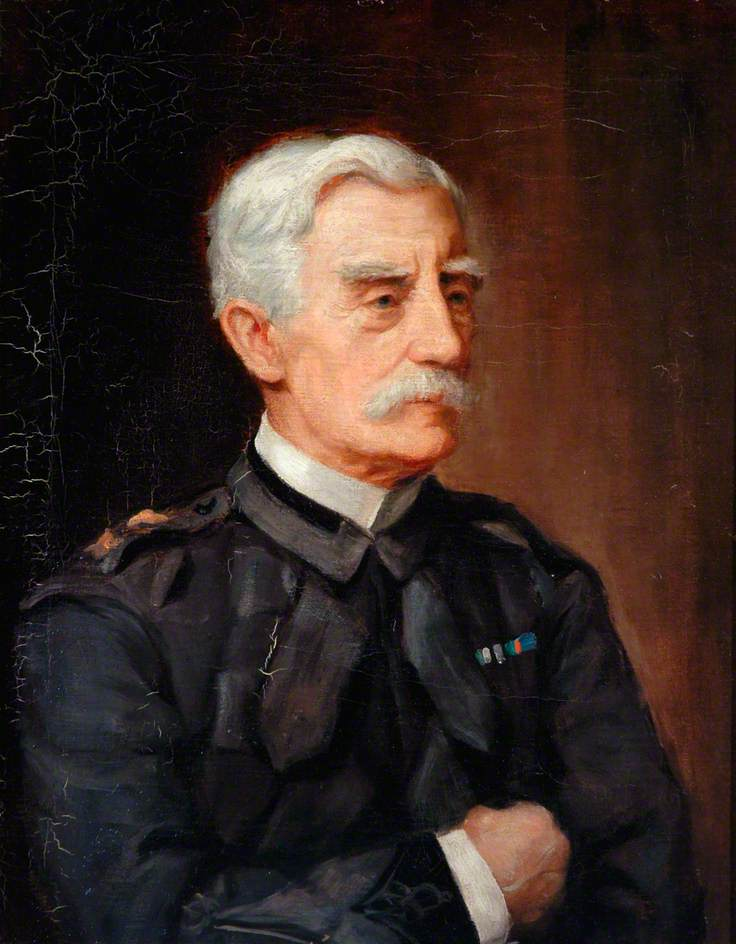
- Portrait by Helen Donald-Smith
- Born: 26 September 1839; Wandsworth, London
- Died: 17 May 1920 (aged 80); Knightsbridge, London
- Relatives: Sir William Robert Grove (father); Edmond Herbert Grove-Hills (nephew)
- Military career
- Allegiance: United Kingdom
- Branch: British Army
- Service years: 1863–1901
- Rank: Major-General
- Conflicts: Mahdist War
- Awards: Knight Commander of the Order of the Bath

Major-General Sir Coleridge Grove KCB (26 September 1839 – 17 May 1920) was a senior British Army officer who went on to be Military Secretary.

== Early life and education ==
Grove was born in Wandsworth, the second son of Rt. Hon. Sir William Robert Grove, a Welsh judge and scientist, and Emma Maria Towles. He attended Balliol College, Oxford, as an Exhibitioner, where he took first classes in Mathematical Moderations and the final school.

His sister Imogen Emily married William Edward Hall in 1866, while his sister Anna married Herbert Augustus Hills (1837–1907) and was mother to Edmond Herbert Grove-Hills and John Waller Hills.

== Military career ==
Grove was commissioned into the 15th Regiment of Foot in 1863. He went on to serve in Egypt and Sudan. He became Aide-de-Camp to the Governor-General of Ireland in 1882 and Deputy Assistant Adjutant-General at Army Headquarters in 1883 moving on to be Private Secretary to the Secretary of State for War in 1886 and Assistant Adjutant-General at Headquarters after that.

Appointed Military Secretary in 1896, he developed plans for universal military training in the British Army. He retired in 1901.

In retirement, he was Colonel of the East Yorkshire Regiment from November 1901 to 1920.

He had in his possessions a large Elizabethan chest which was lost in a great fire in Brussels in 1910. He died in 1920.

Military offices
Preceded by Sir Reginald Gipps	Military Secretary; 1896–1901	Succeeded by Sir Ian Hamilton
Honorary titles
Preceded by William Hardy	Colonel of the East Yorkshire Regiment; 1901–1920	Succeeded by Francis Seymour Inglefield
