= Robin Lindsay (British Army officer) =

British Army general

Major General Robin Lindsay CBE
- Lindsay in June 2020
- Military career
- Allegiance: United Kingdom
- Branch: British Army
- Service years: 1992 – Present
- Rank: Major General
- Service number: 542997
- Unit: Royal Regiment of Scotland
- Awards: Commander of the Order of the British Empire

Major General Robin Ronald Edward Lindsay CBE is a senior British Army officer.

== Military career ==
Lindsay was commissioned into the Scottish Division of the Infantry on 7 August 1992. After commanding the Royal Highland Fusiliers, 2nd Battalion The Royal Regiment of Scotland on deployment in Helmand Province in Afghanistan in 2013, he became commander of 51st Infantry Brigade and Headquarters Scotland in May 2018. He went on to join the directing staff at the Defence Academy in Shrivenham in May 2021 and served as Military Secretary and General Officer, Scotland, from October 2023 to October 2026.

Lindsay was appointed Regimental Colonel of the Royal Regiment of Scotland on 22 March 2024, and a Deputy Colonel Commandant of the Adjutant General's Corps in October 2024. He was appointed Honorary Colonel of the Highland Officer Training Regiment on 1 September 2026.

He was awarded the Queen's Commendation for Valuable Service in March 2015 and was appointed a Commander of the Order of the British Empire (CBE) in the 2022 New Year Honours.

== Family connections ==
His grandfather, who served in the Royal Scots Fusiliers from 1925 to 1936, was Sir Martin Lindsay, 1st Baronet, the renowned polar explorer.

== See also ==
- Armed forces in Scotland
- Military history of Scotland

Military offices
Preceded by William Wright	Military Secretary; 2023–2026	Succeeded by Nicholas Thomas
Preceded by William Wright	General Officer Scotland; 2023–2026	Succeeded by Nicholas Thomas
