= Waterloo Lines =

British Army barracks in Warminster, Wiltshire

- Part of Warminster Garrison
- Warminster, Wiltshire in England
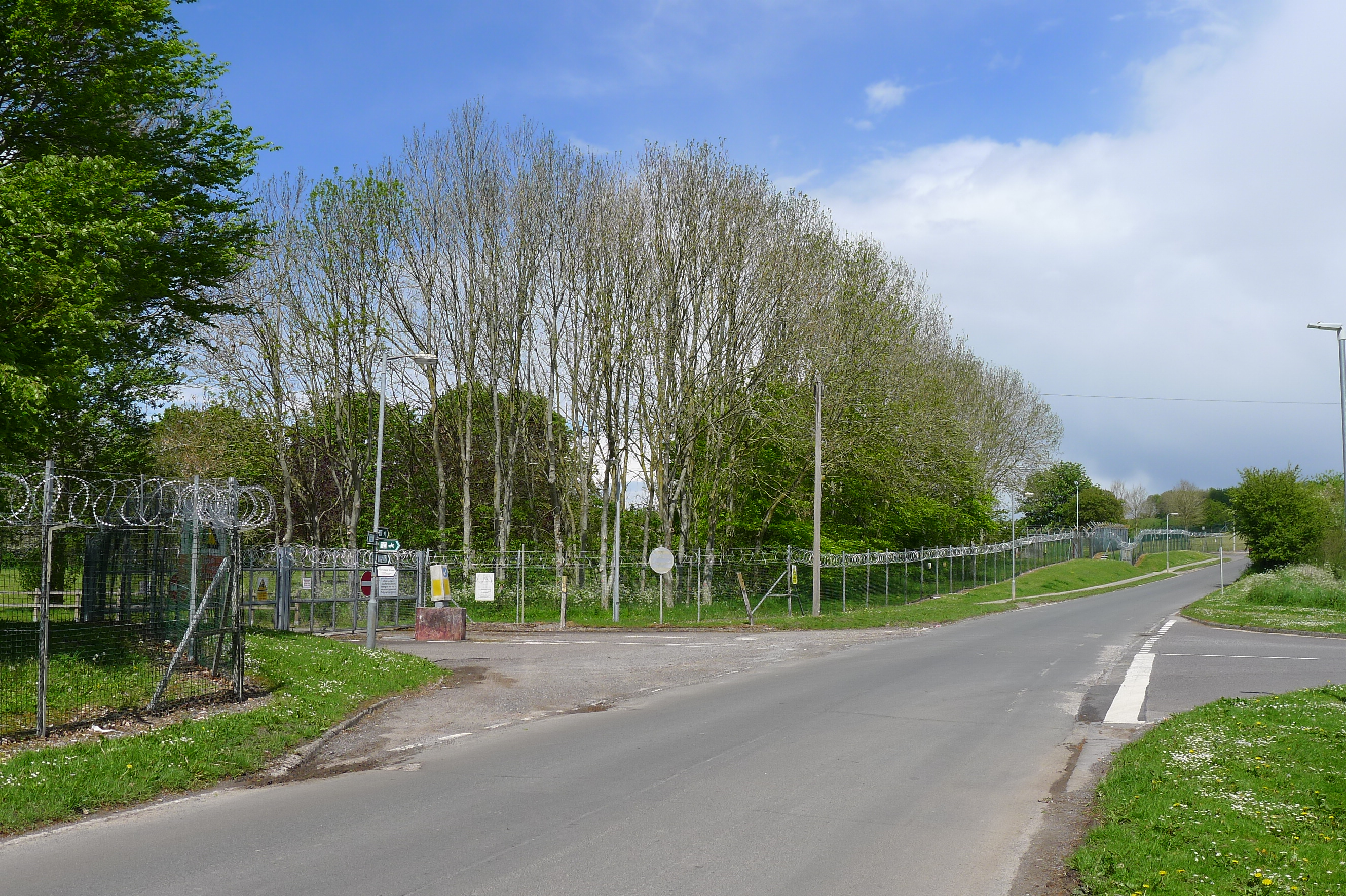
- Exterior of Waterloo Lines from Imber Road

Site information
- Type: Army barracks
- Owner: Ministry of Defence
- Operator: British Army
- Controlled by: Field Army
- Condition: Operational

Location
- Location within Wiltshire
- Coordinates: 51.212°N 2.160°W
- Area: 95 hectares (230 acres)

Site history
- Built: 1945
- In use: 1945 – present

Waterloo Lines is a British Army barracks on Imber Road in Warminster, Wiltshire, England. It is currently home to a number of Army specialist training schools and a sizeable portion of the Headquarters Field Army (not to be confused with Army HQ in Andover).

== History ==
Waterloo Lines has its origins in the Battle School established near Barnard Castle in County Durham in 1941: it moved to Warminster in 1945 and was known as the School of Infantry until it was renamed the Land Warfare Centre in 1988. The site, on the northern outskirts of the town, lies under the edge of Salisbury Plain and has access to the military training areas on the Plain. In 2009, the extent of the Warminster Training Centre site was 95 hectares (230 acres).

== Land Warfare Centre ==
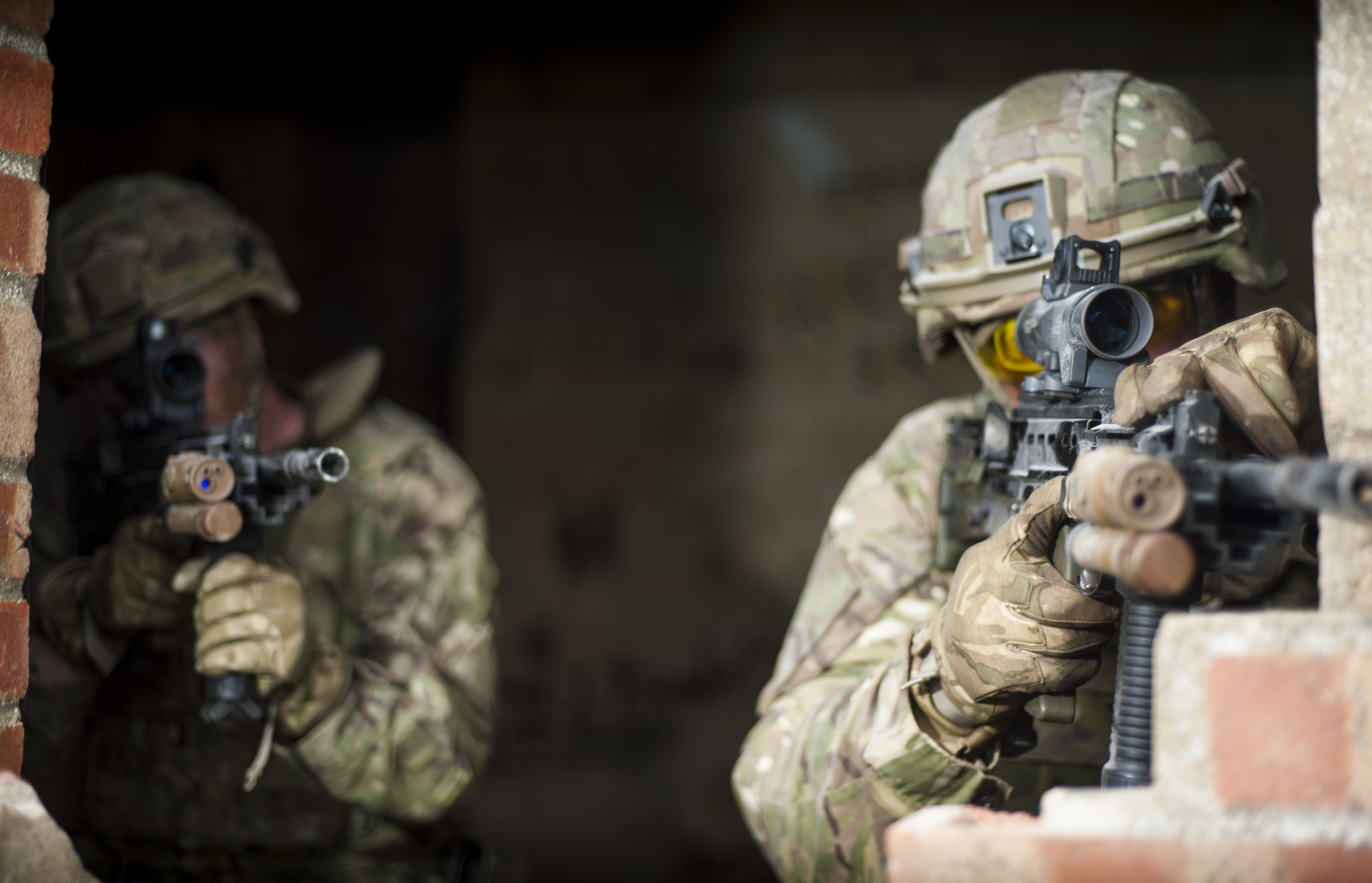
Soldiers taking part in a Reconnaissance and Armoured Tactics Division final exercise

The history of Warminster's military garrison can be traced back to Roman Britain, when a small camp was on the site of the current Battlesbury Barracks. However, under the Options for Change programme following the Dissolution of the Soviet Union and subsequent end of the Cold War, Headquarters, Combined Arms Training Centre in Warminster was dual-headed as Headquarters, Warminster Garrison and Warminster Training Centre on 1 April 1993. This itself was formed from a merger of the defunct Headquarters School of Infantry and the Barracks, Warminster (today known as Battlesbury Barracks). All three of these elements merged into the Warminster Training Centre (WTC).

On 4 May 1995, as part of the second phase of Options for Change, the Infantry Support Weapons Wing at Netheravon closed and its components moved to WTC as part of the Infantry Training Centre.

On 1 April 2000, the newly appointed Director General, Training Support Command (Land) (now Director Land Warfare) set up his headquarters within WTC, thereby bringing back to Warminster a two-star Major General, a rank previously held by Director of Infantry. Subsequently, its subordinated HQ Army Training Estate also moved adjacent to it.

The Combined Arms Training Centre was renamed to Land Warfare Training Centre in June 2000, which was further refined in 2002 to become Land Warfare Centre (LWC) with HQ Training Support Command (Land) becoming HQ LWC.

== Current units ==
The units currently stationed at the camp include:

=== Ministry of Defence ===
- Headquarters, Defence Training Estate

=== British Army ===
- Headquarters, Land Warfare Centre
- Headquarters, Infantry
- Regimental Headquarters, Small Arms School Corps
- Specialist Weapons School
- Gurkha Company (Tavoleto) – OPFOR role
- Junior Staff Centre (part of Sandhurst Group)
- Combined Arms Tactical Trainer
- Infantry Trials and Development Unit
- Reconnaissance and Armoured Tactics Division (part of The Armour Centre at Bovington Camp)

The Combined Arms Manoeuvre School (CAMS) is based in Waterloo Lines. It is responsible for delivering technical, tactical and command training to tri-service and international specialist weapons commanders, Armoured Fighting Vehicle Crew Commanders, and mounted and dismounted reconnaissance commanders. It was formed in 2022, upon the merger of the Land Warfare Centre's Specialist Weapons School (SWS) and the Reconnaissance and Armoured Tactics Division (RATD). Both SWS and RATD had occupied Waterloo Lines since 1995. CAMS is part of the Combat Manoeuvre Centre, itself part of the Land Warfare Centre.

== See also ==
Other barracks within the Warminster area include:

- Battlesbury Barracks
- Harman Lines
