= William Robert Grove =

Welsh judge and physical scientist (1811–1896)

The Right Honourable Sir William Robert Grove
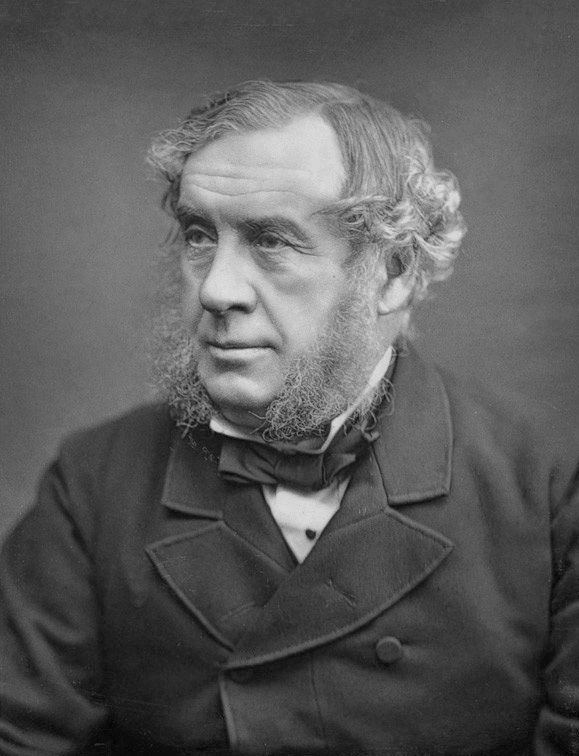
- William Robert Grove
- Born: 11 July 1811; Swansea, Wales
- Died: 1 August 1896 (aged 85); London
- Education: Brasenose College, Oxford
- Known for: conservation of energy, invention of fuel cell, defending William Palmer
- Awards: Royal Medal (1847)
- Scientific career
- Fields: physics, chemistry, patent law, criminal law,
- Workplaces: Lincoln's Inn; British judiciary Royal Institution; Royal Society; Privy council

Sir William Robert Grove, FRS FRSE (11 July 1811 – 1 August 1896) was a Welsh judge and physical scientist. He anticipated the general theory of the conservation of energy, and was a pioneer of fuel cell technology. He invented the Grove voltaic cell.

== Early life ==
Born in Swansea, Wales, Grove was the only child of John, a magistrate and deputy lieutenant of Glamorgan, and his wife, Anne (née Bevan).

His early education was in the hands of private tutors, before he attended Brasenose College, Oxford to study classics, though his scientific interests may have been cultivated by mathematician Baden Powell. Otherwise, his taste for science has no clear origin though his circle in Swansea was broadly educated. He graduated in 1832.

In 1835, he was called to the bar by Lincoln's Inn. In the same year, Grove joined the Royal Institution and was a founder of the Swansea Literary and Philosophical Society, an organisation with which he maintained close links.

== Scientific work ==
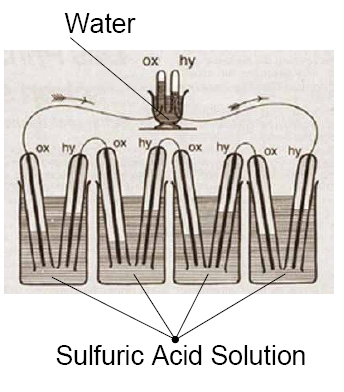
Grove's 1839 gas voltaic battery diagram

In 1829, at the Royal Institution, Grove met Emma Maria Powles.. They married in 1837.

The couple embarked on a tour of the continent for their honeymoon. This sabbatical offered Grove an opportunity to pursue his scientific interests and resulted in his first scientific paper suggesting some novel constructions for electric cells.

During 1839, Grove developed a novel form of electric cell, the Grove cell, which used zinc and platinum electrodes exposed to two acids and separated by a porous ceramic pot. Grove announced the latter development to the Académie des Sciences in Paris in 1839. In 1840 Grove invented one of the first incandescent electric lights, which was later perfected by Thomas Edison.

Later that year, he gave another account of his development at the British Association for the Advancement of Science meeting in Birmingham, where it aroused the interest of Michael Faraday. On Faraday's invitation Grove presented his discoveries at the prestigious Royal Institution Friday Discourse on 13 March 1840.

Grove's presentation made his reputation, and he was soon proposed for Fellowship of the Royal Society by such distinguished men as William Thomas Brande, William Snow Harris and Charles Wheatstone. Grove also attracted the attention of John Peter Gassiot, a relationship that resulted in Grove's becoming the first professor of experimental philosophy at the London Institution in 1841. Grove's inaugural lecture in 1842 was the first announcement of what Grove called the correlation of physical forces, in modern terms, the conservation of energy.

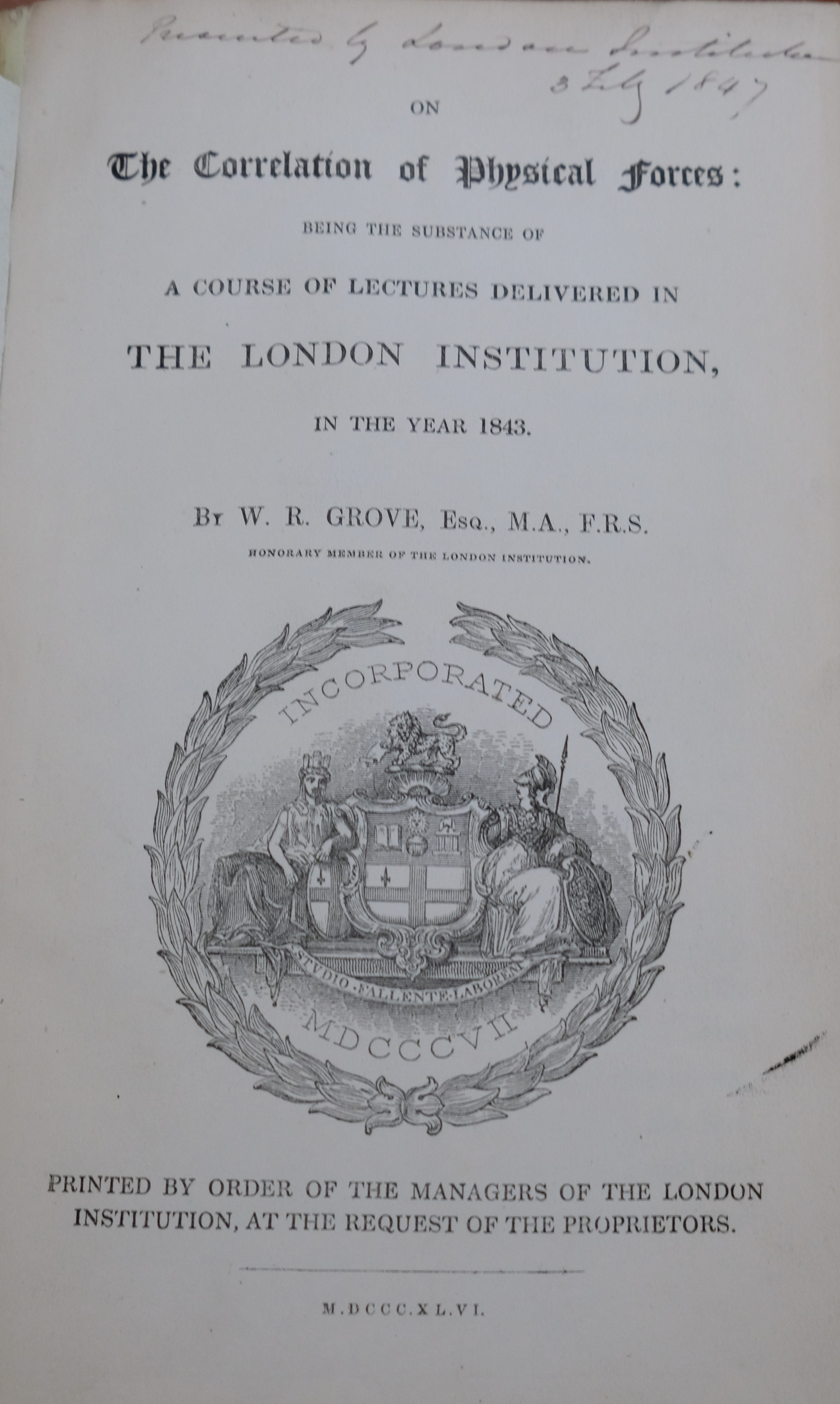
1846 copy of "On the Correlation of Physical Forces"

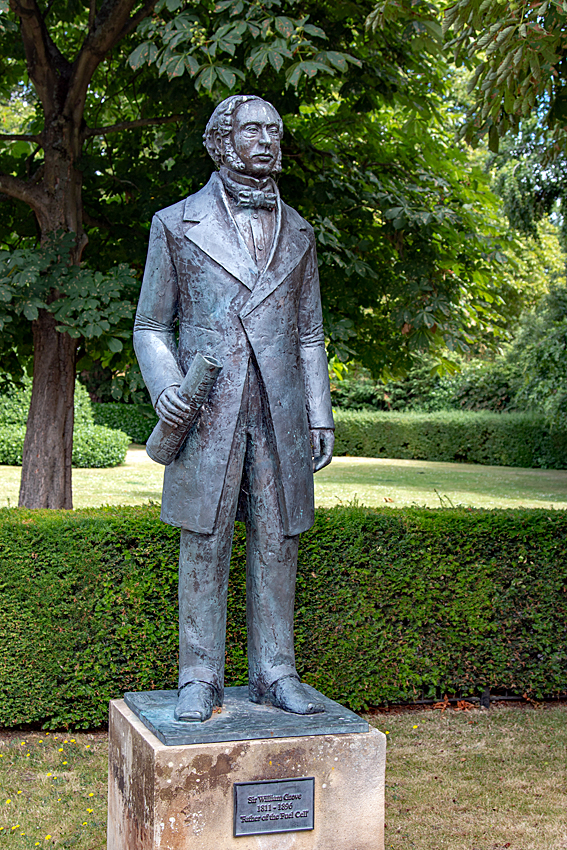
Statue of William Grove in Woking Park

In 1842, Grove developed the first fuel cell (which he called the gas voltaic battery), which produced electrical energy by combining hydrogen and oxygen, and described it using his correlation theory. In developing the cell and showing that steam could be disassociated into oxygen and hydrogen, and the process reversed, he was the first person to demonstrate the thermal dissociation of molecules into their constituent atoms. The first demonstration of this effect, he gave privately to Faraday, Gassiot and Edward William Brayley, his scientific editor.

His work also led him to early insights into the nature of ionisation. For observations made in Ref., Grove is credited for the discovery of sputtering.

In the 1840s, he collaborated with Gassiot at the London Institution on photography and the Daguerreotype and calotype processes. Inspired by his legal practice, he presciently observed:

It would be vain to attempt specifically to predict what may be the effect of Photography on future generations. A Process by which the most transient actions are rendered permanent, by which facts write their own annals in a language that can never be obsolete, forming documents which prove themselves, – must interweave itself not only with science but with history and legislature.

— London Institution, 19 January 1842

In 1852, he discovered striae, dark bands that occur in electrical breakdown, and investigated their character, presenting his work in an 1858 Bakerian lecture.

== On the Correlation of Physical Forces ==
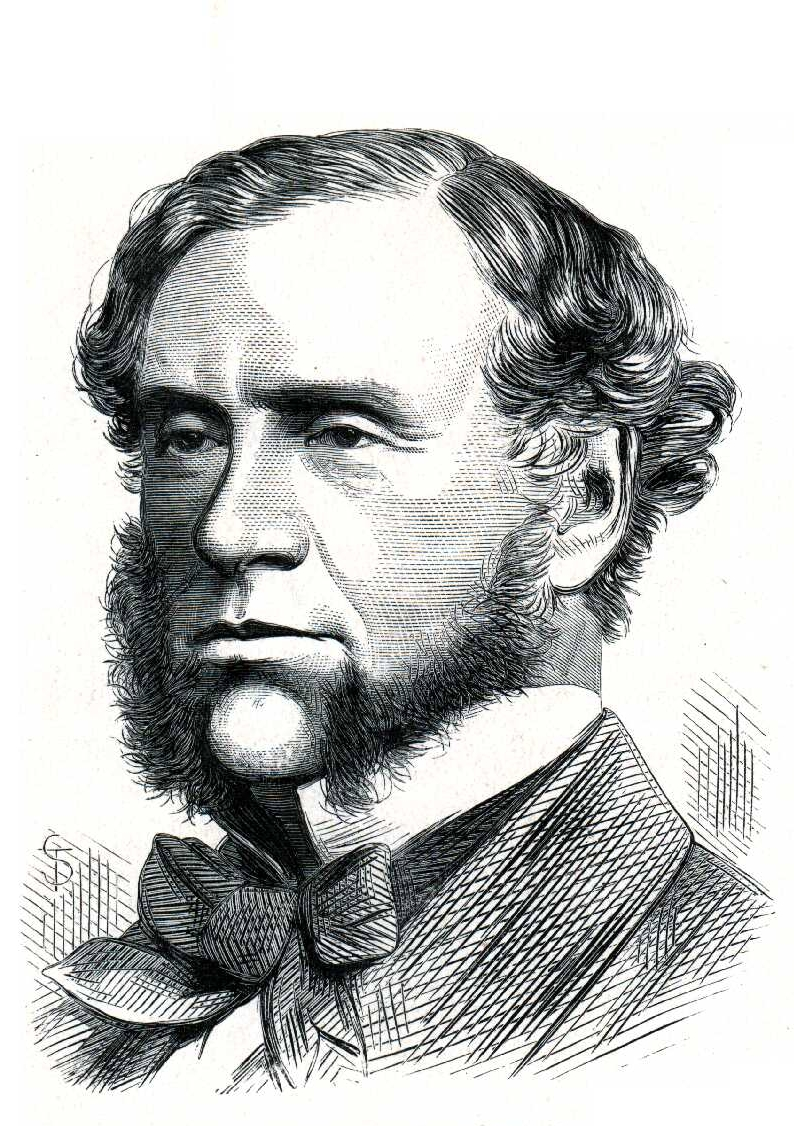
William Robert Grove c. 1850

In 1846, Grove published On The Correlation of Physical Forces in which he anticipated the general theory of the conservation of energy that was more famously put forward in Hermann von Helmholtz' Über die Erhaltung der Kraft (On the Conservation of Force) published the following year. His 1846 Bakerian lecture relied heavily on his theory.

James Prescott Joule had been energized by his investigations into the mechanical equivalent of heat by comparing the mass of coal consumed in a steam engine with the mass of zinc consumed in a Grove battery in performing a common quantity of mechanical work. Grove was certainly familiar with William Thomson's theoretical analysis of Joule's experimental results and Thomson's immature suggestions of conservation of energy. Thomson's public champion, Peter Guthrie Tait was initially a supporter of Grove's ideas but later dismissed them with some coolness.

Though Groves's ideas were forerunners of the theory of the conservation of energy, they were qualitative, unlike the quantitative investigations of Joule or Julius Robert von Mayer. His ideas also shaded into broader speculation, such as the nature of Olbers's paradox, which he may have discovered for himself rather than through a direct knowledge.

... it is difficult to understand why we get so little light at night from the stellar universe, without assuming that some light is lost in its progress through space – not lost absolutely, for that would be an annihilation of force – but converted into some other mode of motion.

— On the Correlation of Physical Forces (1874)

Grove also speculated that other forms of energy were yet to be discovered "as far certain as certain can be of any future event."

The probability is that, if not all, the greater number of physical phenomena are, in one sense correlative, and that, without a duality of conception, the mind cannot form an idea of them: thus motion cannot be perceived or probably imagined without parallax or relative change of position ... in all physical phenomena, the effects produced by motion are all in proportion to the relative motion. ... The question of whether there can be absolute motion, or indeed any absolute isolated force, is purely the metaphysical question of idealism or realism.

— On the Correlation of Physical Forces (1874)

== Royal Society politics ==
As soon as he became a Fellow of the Royal Society in 1840 Grove was a critic of the Society, deprecating its cronyism and the de facto rule of a few influential Council members. In 1843, he published an anonymous attack on the scientific establishment in Blackwood's Magazine and called for reform. In 1846 Grove was elected to the Council of the Royal Society, and was heavily involved in the campaign to modernise its charter, in addition to campaigning for the public funding of science.

A charter committee had already been established, and Grove joined it. Groves's fellow campaigners included Gassiot, Leonard Horner and Edward Sabine. Their principal objectives were for the number of new Fellows to be subject to an annual limit, and limitation of the power of nomination to the Council. The reformers' success in 1847 led to the resignation of several key conservatives and the establishment of Grove and his associates with domination of the Council. To celebrate, the reformers founded the Philosophical Club.

Though the Philosophical Club succeeded in ensuring that William Parsons, 3rd Earl of Rosse was appointed next President, they failed to get Grove appointed as Secretary. Grove continued to campaign for a single home for all the scientific institutions at Burlington House.

== Legal career ==
From 1846 Grove started to reduce his scientific work in favour of his professional practice at the bar, his young family providing the financial motivation; and in 1853 became a QC. The bar provided him with the opportunity to combine his legal and scientific knowledge, in particular in patent law and in the unsuccessful defence of poisoner William Palmer in 1856. He was especially involved in the photography patent cases of Beard v. Egerton (1845–1849), on behalf of Egerton, and of Talbot v. Laroche (1854). In the latter case Grove appeared for William Fox Talbot in his unsuccessful attempt to assert his calotype patent.

Grove served on a Royal Commission on patent law and on the Metropolitan Commission of Sewers.

In 1871 he was made judge of the Court of Common Pleas, and was appointed to the Queen's Bench in 1880. He was to have presided at the Cornwall and Devon winter assizes of 1884, which would have entailed him trying the notorious survival cannibalism case of R v. Dudley and Stephens. However, at the last minute he was substituted by Baron Huddleston, possibly because Huddleston was seen as more reliable in ensuring the guilty verdict that the judiciary required. Grove did sit as one of five judges on the final determination of the case in a divisional court of the Queen's Bench.

Grove was a careful, painstaking and accurate judge, courageous and not afraid to assert an independent judicial opinion. However, he was fallible in patent cases, where he was prone to become overinterested in the technology in question and to be distracted by questioning the litigants as to potential improvements in their devices, even going so far as to suggest his own innovations. He retired from the bench in 1887. His portrait was painted by Helen Donald-Smith in the 1890s.

== Family ==
Grove married Emma Maria Powles, daughter of John Diston Powles, in 1837, and had several children, including Major-General Sir Coleridge Grove. Groves's daughter, Imogen Emily (died 1886), married William Edward Hall in 1866. His daughter Anna married Herbert Augustus Hills (1837–1907) and was mother to Edmond Herbert Grove-Hills ("Colonel Rivers") and John Waller Hills.

His health perpetually troubled, Grove died at home, 115 Harley Street in London, after a long illness. He is buried in Kensal Green Cemetery, London.

== Honours ==
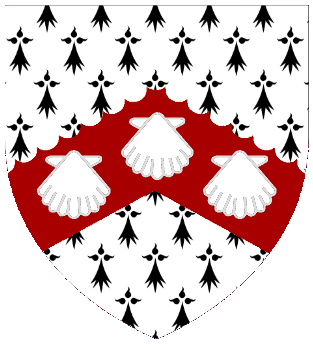
Arms displayed at Lincoln's Inn

Grove became a Fellow of the Royal Society in 1840, and received its Royal Medal in 1847. He was Vice-President of the Royal Institution in 1844. Receiving a knighthood in 1872, he was given an honorary degree by Cambridge University in 1879 and became Privy Councillor in 1887.

The lunar crater "Grove" is named in his honour. The Grove Fuel Cell Symposium and Exhibition is organised by Elsevier.

== See also ==
- Timeline of hydrogen technologies

== Bibliography ==
- Obituaries:
  - The Times, 3 August 1896
  - Nature, 27 August 1896
  - Law Journal, 8 August 1896*Bonney, T. G. (1919). "Annals of the Philosophical Club of the Royal Society Written from its Minute Books". Nature. 104 (2603): 45–46. Bibcode:1919Natur.104...45G. doi:10.1038/104045a0. S2CID 42911250.
- Cantor, G. (1976). "William Robert Grove, the Correlation of Forces, and the conservation of energy". Centaurus. 19 (4): 273–90. Bibcode:1975Cent...19..273C. doi:10.1111/j.1600-0498.1975.tb00327.x.
- Cooper, M. L. & Hall, V. M. D. (1982). "William Robert Grove and the London Institution, 1841–1845". Annals of Science. 39 (3): 229–54. doi:10.1080/00033798200200221.
- Crowther, J. G. (1965). Statesmen of Science. London: Cresset Press. pp. 77–101.
- Edwards, E. (1863–67). L. Reeve; E. Walford (eds.). Portraits of Men of Eminence in Literature, Science and the Arts, with Biographical Memoirs (6 vols ed.).
- Lyons, H. G. (1938) Notes and Records of the Royal Society London, 1:28–31
- Morus, I. R. (1991). "Correlation and control: William Robert Grove and the construction of a new philosophy of scientific reform". Studies in the History and Philosophy of Science. 22 (4): 589–621. Bibcode:1991SHPSA..22..589M. doi:10.1016/0039-3681(91)90035-Q.
- Vernon, K. D. C. (1966) Proceedings of the Royal Institution of Great Britain, 41:250–80
- Webb, R. K. (1961). "Sir William Robert Grove (1811–1896) and the origins of the fuel cell". Journal of the Royal Institute of Chemistry. 85: 291. doi:10.1039/ji9618500291.
