= Military Secretary (United Kingdom) =

British Army appointment

The military secretary is the British Army office with responsibility for appointments, promotion, postings and discipline of high ranking officers of the British Army. It is a senior British Army appointment, held by an officer holding the rank of major-general. The position of Deputy Military Secretary is held by an officer holding the rank of brigadier. The military secretary's counterpart in the Royal Navy is the Naval Secretary. The Royal Air Force equivalent is the Air Secretary.

The post was initially established as the public secretary or military secretary to the commander-in-chief of the Forces in 1795 (prior to which a civilian had served as secretary to the commander-in-chief).

The title was formally changed to Military Secretary to the Secretary of State for War in 1904. It was sometimes referred to in military jargon as Military Secretary at Headquarters. In 1964 it became Military Secretary to the secretary of state for defence.

In 1995 a new Army Personnel Centre was established in Glasgow with the military secretary as its chief executive.

== Military secretaries ==
Holders of the post have included:

- Colonel Robert Brownrigg, 1795–1803
- Colonel William Clinton, 1803–1804
- Lieutenant-Colonel James Gordon, 1804–1809
- Major-General Sir Henry Torrens, 1809–1820
- Lieutenant-General Sir Herbert Taylor, 1820–1827
- Lieutenant-General Lord FitzRoy Somerset, 1827–1852
- Colonel Richard Airey, 1852–1854
- Lieutenant-General Sir Charles Yorke, 1854–1860
- Lieutenant-General William Forster, 1860–1871
- Major-General Caledon Egerton, 1871–1874
- General Sir Alfred Horsford, 1874–1880
- Lieutenant-General Sir Edmund Whitmore, 1880–1885
- Lieutenant-General Sir George Harman, 1885–1892
- General Sir Reginald Gipps, 1892–1896
- Major-General Sir Coleridge Grove, 1896–1901
- Lieutenant-General Sir Ian Hamilton, 1901–1903
  - Lieutenant-General Lord William Seymour, acting Nov 1901–1902 (while General Hamilton served in South Africa)
- Major-General Sir Ronald Lane, 1903–1904
- Colonel John Spencer Ewart, 1904–1906
- General Sir Arthur Wynne, 1906–1911
- Lieutenant-General Sir William Franklyn, 1911–1914
- Lieutenant-General Sir Alfred Codrington, 1914
- Major-General Sir Frederick Robb, 1914–1916
- Lieutenant-General Sir Francis Davies, 1916–1919
- Lieutenant-General Sir Philip Chetwode, 1919–1920
- Lieutenant-General Sir Alexander Godley, 1920–1922
- Lieutenant-General Sir William Peyton, 1922–1926
- Lieutenant-General Sir David Campbell, 1926–1927
- Major-General Sir Gerald Boyd, 1927–1930
- Lieutenant-General Sir Sidney Clive, 1930–1934
- Lieutenant-General Sir Charles Deedes, 1934–1937
- Major-General John Vereker, 6th Viscount Gort, 1937
- Lieutenant-General Douglas Brownrigg, 1938–1939
- Lieutenant-General George Giffard, 1939–1940
- Lieutenant-General Arthur Floyer-Acland, 1940–1942
- General Sir Colville Wemyss, 1942–1946
- Lieutenant-General Sir Frederick Browning, 1946–1948
- Lieutenant-General Sir Charles Keightley, 1948
- Lieutenant-General Sir Robert Mansergh, 1948–1949
- Lieutenant-General Sir Kenneth McLean, 1949–1951
- Lieutenant-General Sir Euan Miller, 1951–1954
- Lieutenant-General Sir Colin Callander, 1954–1957
- General Sir Hugh Stockwell, 1957–1959
- Lieutenant-General Sir Geoffrey Thompson, 1959–1961
- Lieutenant-General Sir William Stirling, 1961–1963
- General Sir John Anderson, 1963–1966
- Lieutenant-General Sir Richard Elton Goodwin, 1966–1969
- Lieutenant-General Sir Thomas Pearson, 1969–1972
- Lieutenant-General Sir John Sharp, 1972–1974
- Lieutenant-General Sir Patrick Howard-Dobson, 1974–1976
- Lieutenant-General Sir Robert Ford, 1976–1978
- Lieutenant-General Sir Robin Carnegie, 1978–1980
- Lieutenant-General Sir Roland Guy, 1980–1983
- Lieutenant-General Sir David Mostyn, 1983–1986
- Lieutenant-General Sir Patrick Palmer, 1986–1989
- Lieutenant-General Sir John Learmont, 1989–1991
- Lieutenant-General Sir William Rous, 1991–1994
- Major-General Robert Hayman-Joyce, 1994–1995
- Major-General Michael Scott, 1995–1997
- Major-General David Burden, 1997–1999
- Major-General Alistair Irwin, 1999–2000
- Major-General Peter Grant Peterkin, 2000–2003
- Major-General Freddie Viggers, 2003–2005
- Major-General Nicholas Cottam, 2005–2008
- Major-General Mark Mans, 2008–2009
- Major-General David Rutherford-Jones, 2009–2011
- Major-General Andrew Gregory, 2011–2013
- Major-General Shaun Burley, 2013–2015
- Major-General Nicholas Ashmore, 2015–2017
- Major-General Robert Bruce, 2017–2019
- Major-General Timothy Hyams, 2019–2021
- Major-General William Wright, 2021–2023
- Major-General Robin Lindsay, 2023–2026
- Major-General Nicholas Thomas, 2026–present

== See also ==
- Military Secretary to the India Office
