= Tim Hyams =

British army officer

Major General Tim Hyams CB OBE
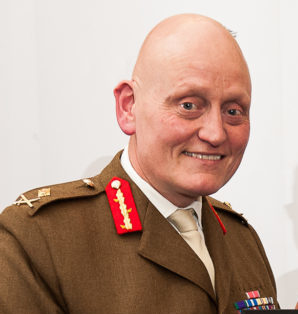
- Hyams in 2019
- Military career
- Allegiance: United Kingdom
- Branch: British Army
- Service years: 1986–present
- Rank: Major General
- Unit: Royal Dragoon Guards
- Commands: Scottish Command; Land Warfare; Army Recruiting and Training Division; Royal Dragoon Guards
- Conflicts: The Troubles; Kosovo War; Iraq War; War in Afghanistan
- Awards: Companion of the Order of the Bath; Officer of the Order of the British Empire

Major General Timothy David Hyams, CB, OBE is a senior British Army officer.

== Military career ==
Hyams was commissioned into the 5th Royal Inniskilling Dragoon Guards in 1986. His regiment was amalgamated with the 4th/7th Royal Dragoon Guards to form the Royal Dragoon Guards in 1992. After deployments in Northern Ireland and Kosovo, he was commanding officer of the Royal Dragoon Guards from 2005 to 2008, in which capacity he was deployed to Iraq in 2007.

Hyams became Director of Personal Services in July 2011 and, after being sent to Afghanistan on a mission to consider the insider threat across the NATO command, he became Director of Personnel Strategy in January 2013 and Commander, Collective Training Group, Land Warfare Centre in February 2014. He went on to be General Officer Commanding Army Recruiting and Training Division in October 2016, Director Land Warfare in April 2018 and became Military Secretary and General Officer, Scotland, in October 2019.

He was Colonel Commandant of the Scottish, Welsh and Irish Division, Infantry until he relinquished this position in December 2022.

He was Regimental Colonel of the Royal Dragoon Guards from 2019 until August 2024.

Hyams was appointed Companion of the Order of the Bath (CB) in the 2022 New Year Honours.

Military offices
Preceded by Christopher Tickell	General Officer Commanding, Army Recruiting and Training Division; 2016–2018	Succeeded by Post subsumed within Army Recruiting and Initial Training Command
Preceded by Bob Bruce	Military Secretary; 2019–2021	Succeeded by William Wright
Preceded by Bob Bruce	General Officer Scotland; 2019–2021	Succeeded by William Wright
