= Reginald Gipps =

British Army officer and Military Secretary from 1892 to 1896

General Sir Reginald Gipps GCB
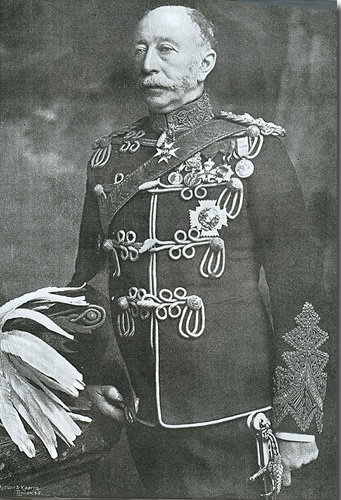
- Gipps in 1897
- Born: 14 May 1831
- Died: 10 September 1908 (aged 77)
- Burial place: Victoria Road Cemetery, Farnborough, Hampshire
- Military career
- Allegiance: United Kingdom
- Branch: British Army
- Service years: 1849–96
- Rank: General
- Commands: Home District (1884–89); Scots Guards (1878–81); 1st Battalion Scots Guards (1874–78)
- Conflicts: Crimean War
- Awards: Knight Grand Cross of the Order of the Bath; Knight of the Legion of Honour (France)

General Sir Reginald Ramsay Gipps, GCB (14 May 1831 – 10 September 1908) was a senior British Army officer who served as Military Secretary from 1892 until his retirement in 1896.

== Military career ==
Born the only son of Major Sir George Gipps and educated at Eton College, Gipps was commissioned into the Scots Guards in 1849. He fought in the Crimean War at the Battle of Alma, where he was wounded by a bayonet in the hand, and the Battle of Inkerman, where he was wounded in the neck. He also took part in the Siege of Sevastopol. He was made commanding officer of the 1st Battalion, Scots Guards in 1874, and of his regiment in 1878. He was given command of a brigade in Ireland in 1881. He went on to be Major General commanding the Brigade of Guards and General Officer Commanding the Home District in 1884 and, promoted to lieutenant general in December 1889, deputy adjutant-general for Auxiliary Forces in 1891 and Military Secretary in 1892.

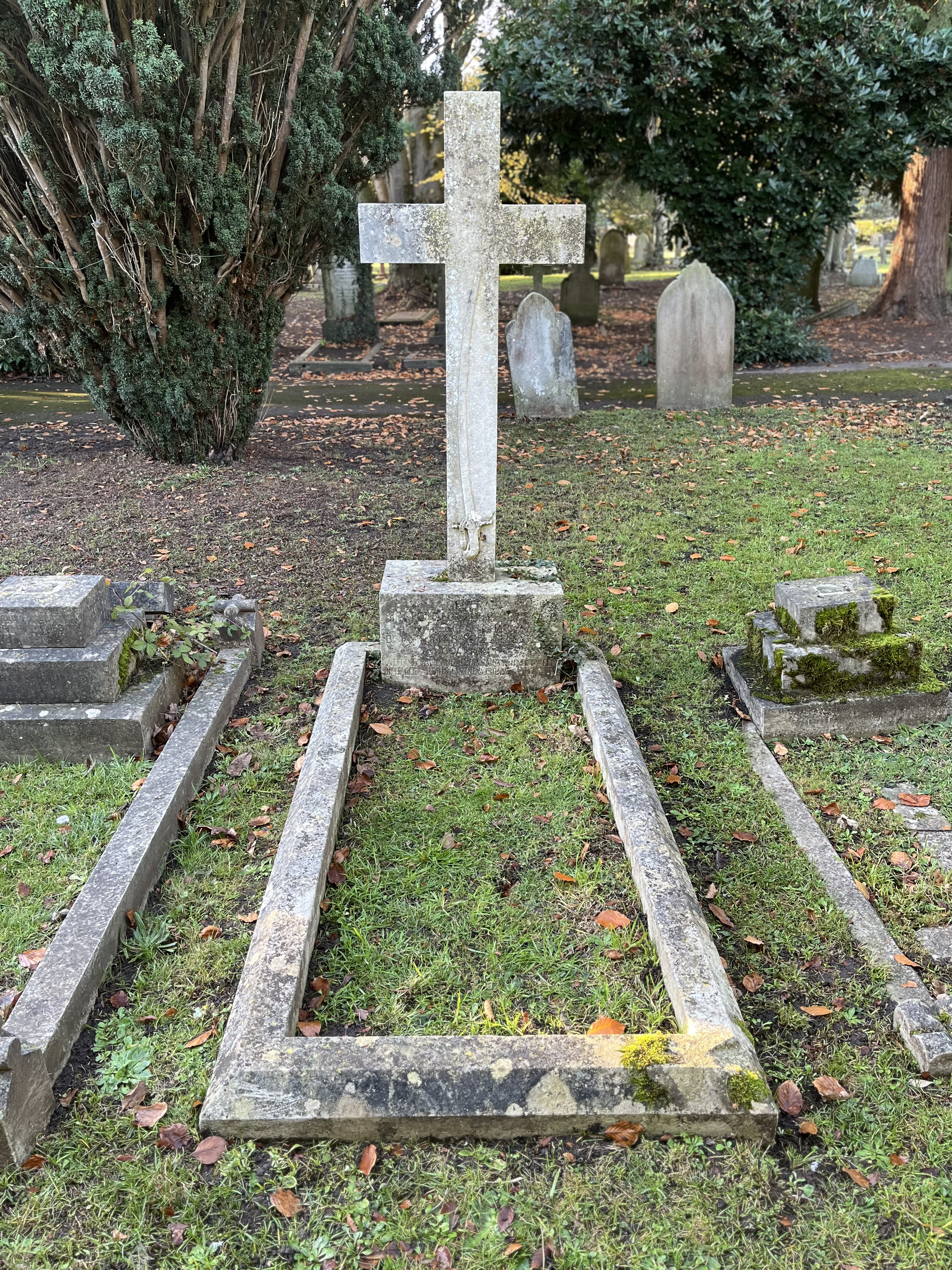
The grave of General Sir Reginald Ramsay Gipps in the Victoria Road Cemetery in Farnborough in Hampshire

He was also colonel of the Durham Light Infantry in December 1897.

He lived at Sycamore Lodge in Farnborough. He is buried in the Victoria Road Cemetery in Farnborough, Hampshire.

== Family ==
In 1886, he married Evelyn Charlotte Feilden with whom he had two sons and one daughter.

Military offices
| Preceded by Sir George Higginson | GOC Home District; 1884–1889 | Succeeded by Philip Smith |
| Preceded by Sir George Harman | Military Secretary; 1892–1896 | Succeeded by Sir Coleridge Grove |
