= George Harman (British Army officer) =

British Army officer

Lieutenant-General Sir George Harman KCB
- Born: 30 January 1830; London, United Kingdom
- Died: 9 March 1892 (aged 62); London, United Kingdom
- Military career
- Allegiance: United Kingdom
- Branch: British Army
- Service years: 1849–1892
- Rank: Lieutenant-General
- Conflicts: Crimean War; Indian Mutiny; Mahdist War
- Awards: Knight Commander of the Order of the Bath

Lieutenant-General Sir George Byng Harman KCB (30 January 1830 – 9 March 1892) was a senior British Army officer who went on to be Military Secretary.

== Military career ==
Educated at Marlborough College, Harman was commissioned into the 34th Regiment of Foot in 1849. He served in the Crimean War and took part in the assault on the Redan during the Siege of Sevastopol in 1855 and was severely wounded. He also served with his Regiment in putting down the Indian Mutiny and was present at the Capture of Lucknow in 1857. He became Assistant Inspector of Volunteers in 1860 and Assistant Military Secretary in the West Indies in 1866. In 1873 he took command of a Brigade Depot at Pontefract, in 1874 he became Assistant Adjutant-General at Aldershot and in 1878 he was appointed Deputy Adjutant-General in Ireland.

In 1882 he joined the General Staff for the Expedition to Egypt taking command of the Garrison at Alexandria.

He became Deputy Adjutant-General at Army Headquarters in 1883 and Military Secretary in 1885. In that capacity he gave evidence to the Camperdown Committee, which were reviewing medical services in the British Army, and in his evidence accused Medical Officers of "affecting to be combatant officers" in order to secure promotion.

He was still serving on the staff at headquarters when he died in South Kensington on 9 March 1892.

== Family ==
He married in 1868 Helen, daughter of John Tonge of Starborough Castle and Edenbridge, Kent; she survived him.

== Notes ==
Military offices
Preceded by Sir Edmund Whitmore	Military Secretary; 1885–1892	Succeeded by Sir Reginald Gipps
