= Edmond Herbert Grove-Hills =

British soldier and astronomer

- Born: 1 August 1864
- Died: 2 October 1922 (aged 58); London
- Occupation: Military cartographer

Colonel Edmond Herbert Hills CMG CBE FRS (1 August 1864 – 2 October 1922), surnamed Grove-Hills from 1920-22, was a British military engineer, surveyor and astronomer.

He produced the maps that were used by British forces during the Boer War (1899-1902), and arbitrated on the border between Argentina and Chile (1902). He retired from the army in 1905, but was recalled to serve on the home front during the First World War (1914-1918).

Hills had an interest in scientific matters, becoming a fellow of the Royal Society and Royal Astronomical Society (RAS). He was particularly interested in total solar eclipses, and took part in several expeditions to obtain scientific observations of them. He was President of the RAS from 1913-15. Hills collected an extensive library of rare books, which he donated to the RAS in his will.

== Family and personal life ==
He was born on 1 August 1864 at High Head Castle, Cumberland. His parents were Herbert Augustus Hills and Anna Hills (née Grove). Herbert was a judge and Anna was the daughter of the scientist and judge William Robert Grove. Edmond was educated at Winchester College until 1882.

In 1892 he married Juliet Spencer-Bell, the youngest daughter of the politician James Spencer-Bell.

His maternal uncle was Coleridge Grove, a major-general in the army. When Coleridge died in 1920, his will requested that Edmond adopt the surname Grove-Hills, which he did.

He died on 2 October 1922 and is buried in Kensal Green Cemetery, London.

== Military service ==
Hills entered the Royal Military Academy, Woolwich in 1882, where he was an officer cadet for two years. He received a commission as a lieutenant in the Royal Engineers on 5 July 1884, and was promoted to captain on 1 April 1893.

In 1899 he was transferred to the Royal School of Military Engineering at Chatham, where he taught chemistry and photography. A year later in September 1900, he was appointed deputy assistant adjutant general (DAAG) in the general staff at the War Office. In this role he was responsible for military surveying and cartography.

During the Boer War (1899-1902) in modern South Africa, Hills was responsible for supplying maps for the officers in the field, which required new triangulation surveys. Under his leadership, the military surveys were extended from the base point at the Royal Observatory, Cape of Good Hope across South Africa, up to a latitude of 30 degrees south. He was promoted to major on 25 July 1901.

In 1902, Hills was the secretary of the British tribunal that arbitrated on the disputed border between Chile and Argentina. For this service he was appointed a Companion of the Order of St Michael and St George (CMG) in December 1902.

Hills retired from the army around 1905, but was recalled to active service in 1914 (then aged 50) for the First World War. He was appointed Assistant Chief Engineer of Eastern Command, based in London. He served until the end of the war in 1918, when he retired again, having reached the rank of colonel. He was made a Commander of the Order of the British Empire (CBE) in 1919.

== Politics ==
Hills stood in the 1906 United Kingdom general election as a Conservative Party candidate in the Portsmouth constituency. He received 17% of the vote (in a two-member constituency) and was not elected.

== Scientific career ==
While serving in the army, he developed an interest in geodesy and solar physics. In 1893 he presented research on optics at a meeting of the Royal Astronomical Society (RAS), of which he was already a Fellow.

He was particularly interested in solar eclipses and joined an expedition to observe the 1893 eclipse. Hills' reported the spectroscopy obtained during that expedition at a meeting of the Royal Society in 1894, which became his first scientific publication (in the Proceedings of the Royal Society).

He took part in several total eclipse expeditions, observing those of August 1896 (in Japan) and of January 1898 (in India).

He became a fellow of the Royal Geographical Society in 1903.

He was elected a Fellow of the Royal Society in 1911, his candidacy citation reading:

Distinguished as an Astronomer and Geodesist. Secretary since 1896 of the Joint Permanent Eclipse Committee of the Royal Society and Royal Astronomical Society. Treasurer of the Royal Astronomical Society. Instructor in Chemistry and Photography at the School of Military Engineering, Chatham (1893–1899). Head of the Topographical Department of the War Office (1899-1905). Has taken an important part in the systematization of the Scientific Survey of the British Empire. Started the 1/1,000,000 map of Africa. Secretary of the Arbitration Tribunal to determine the frontier between Chile and Argentina (1899-1902). Employed by the War and Colonial Offices to make inspections and formulate schemes for future survey work in the following colonies: - Canada (1903), East Africa (1907); Uganda (1907), Ceylon (1907), Federated Malay States (1907), and Southern Nigeria (1909). President of the Geographical Section of the British Association (1908). Has taken part in several eclipse expeditions, West Africa (1893), Japan (1896), and India (1898), obtaining photographs of the flash and corona spectra with slit spectroscopes. Author of the following papers: - 'The Determination of Terrestrial Longitudes by Photography' (Mem Roy Astron Soc; 1897); 'The Optical Distortion of a Doublet Lens' (Monthly Notices, Royal Astron Soc; 1899); 'The Geography of International Frontiers' (Geograph Journ, 1906); and in conjunction with Sir J Larmor: - 'The Irregular Movements of the Earth's Axis of Rotation: a Contribution towards the Analysis of its Causes' (Monthly Notices, Roy Astron Soc, 1906)

—

He was elected as President of the Royal Astronomical Society in 1912, serving in that position from 1913 to 1915.

Hills set out on another eclipse expedition, to observe the August 1914 eclipse from Kiev, then part of the Russian Empire. The goal was to record spectra of the chromosphere using a high-resolution slit-less spectrograph attached to a 12-inch (30 cm) heliostat. A collaboration was arranged with the University of Kiev to observe the eclipse from their botanic garden, with the assistance of academics and students from Kiev and Petrograd (the Russian capital). The three British observers were Hills, Alfred Fowler, and William Edward Curtis. However the trip was unsuccessful due to the outbreak of the First World War. The British party arrived in Riga on 1 August, the same day as Russia declared war on Germany. They were advised that it would be impossible to reach Kiev or send a message to their collaborators, due to the prioritisation of military traffic on the railways and electric telegraph system. A diversion to join another eclipse team in Sweden was attempted, but the ship was not granted the necessary permission to depart. On 4 August, Britain entered the war; on 6 August the British embassy in Petrograd ordered Hills to return to Britain. The expedition was abandoned and Hills returned to London, arriving on 14 August.

== Library ==
Grove-Hills was a bibliophile who collected rare books from the history of astronomy and geophysics. At the time of his death, his library contained more than 500 books dating from 1472 to 1733 and 37 incunabula from even earlier dates. These included works by Galileo, Newton, Kepler, Copernicus and others. A 21st century librarian described it as "one of the greatest collections of astronomical rare books collected by a single person". In his will, Grove-Hills donated this library to the Royal Astronomical Society, where it now forms the Grove-Hills Collection.
