= Edmund Whitmore =

British Army general

Lieutenant-General Sir Edmund Whitmore KCB
- Born: 8 July 1819; Malta
- Died: 14 December 1890 (aged 71)
- Military career
- Allegiance: United Kingdom
- Branch: British Army
- Service years: 1841–1885
- Rank: Lieutenant-General
- Conflicts: Crimean War
- Awards: Knight Commander of the Order of the Bath

Lieutenant-General Sir Edmund Augustus Whitmore KCB (8 July 1819 – 14 December 1890) was a senior British Army officer who went on to be Military Secretary.

== Military career ==
Born in Malta, Whitmore was commissioned into the 30th Regiment of Foot in 1841. He went on to be Adjutant of his Regiment in 1846.

He served in the Crimean War and was decorated with the Order of the Medjidie (5th Class).

By 1861 he was Military Secretary to the Commander-in-Chief, Ireland. In 1876 he was made Inspector-General of Recruiting at Army Headquarters.

Appointed Military Secretary in 1880, Whitmore was accused of failing to advance "only the most thorough efficient men". He retired in 1885.

In retirement he became Colonel of the East Lancashire Regiment from 1889 to his death the following year.

He died in 1890.

Military offices
Preceded by Sir Alfred Horsford	Military Secretary; 1880–1885	Succeeded by Sir George Harman
