= William Wright (British Army officer) =

British Army general

Major General William Wright CBE
- Military career
- Allegiance: United Kingdom
- Branch: British Army
- Service years: 1989–2023
- Rank: Major General
- Unit: The Rifles
- Awards: Commander of the Order of the British Empire

Major General William Stewart Codrington Wright CBE is a retired senior British Army officer.

== Military career ==
Wright was commissioned into the Light Infantry on 5 August 1989. After commanding the 2nd Battalion, The Rifles, he became commander of 1st Armoured Infantry Brigade in August 2014. He went on to become Assistant Commandant of the Royal Military Academy Sandhurst in September 2016 and Director of Army Staff in August 2019. After that he was Military Secretary and General Officer, Scotland, from September 2021 to October 2023. He retired from the army on 27 December 2023.

He was appointed a Member of the Order of the British Empire (MBE) in the 2009 New Year Honours, advanced to Officer of the Order of the British Empire (OBE) in the 2013 Birthday Honours and advanced to Commander of the Order of the British Empire (CBE) in the 2020 Birthday Honours.

Military offices
Preceded by Tim Hyams	Military Secretary; 2021–2023	Succeeded by Robin Lindsay
Preceded by Tim Hyams	General Officer Scotland; 2021–2023	Succeeded by Robin Lindsay
