= Combined Arms Tactical Trainer =

Simulator for military training

The Combined Arms Tactical Trainer (CATT) is the British Army's primary tactical battlegroup simulator, consisting of over 150 networked simulators which replicate the interiors of armoured vehicles. It has sites at Warminster in Wiltshire (near Waterloo Lines) and Sennelager in Germany, which can be operated separately or inter-linked.

Built in the 1990s and in use since 2002, the system is a development of the United States Army's Close Combat Tactical Trainer. The simulator can train up to 450 military personnel on a virtual battlefield, and is run jointly by the Ministry of Defence, Lockheed Martin and BAE Systems. In 2005, the total cost of the program was stated to be £238 million, and the Defence Procurement Agency claimed it was the largest and most sophisticated virtual training facility in the world. The interior of the Warminster building was refurbished in 2019.

== See also ==
- AVCATT (Aviation Combined Arms Tactical Trainer) – United States Army
- SIMNET – United States Army, 1980s and 1990s
