= Royal Dragoon Guards =

The Royal Dragoon Guards
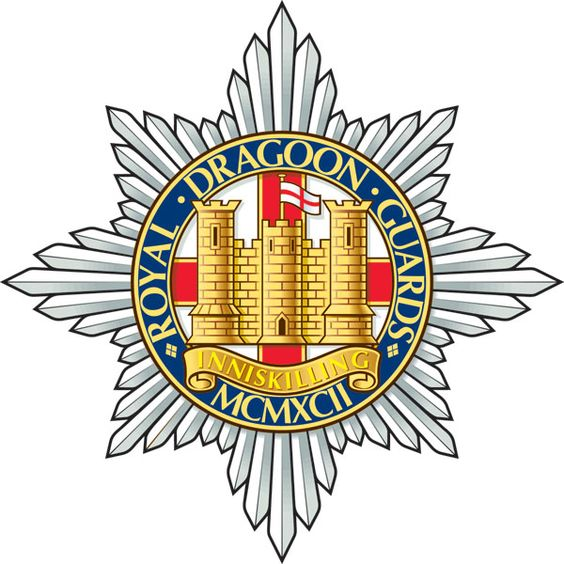
- Regimental badge
- Active: 1 August 1992 – present
- Branch: British Army
- Type: Dragoon Guards
- Role: Reconnaissance
- Size: One regiment
- Part of: Royal Armoured Corps
- Garrison/HQ: RHQ: York; Regiment: Battlesbury Barracks, Warminster
- Mottos: Quis Separabit "Who shall separate us"
- March: Quick – Fare Thee Well Inniskilling; Slow – 4th Dragoon Guards (first two themes) + 7th Dragoon Guards (first theme)
- Anniversaries: 17 March – St Patrick's Day

Commanders
- Colonel-in-Chief: Prince Edward, Duke of Edinburgh
- Regimental Colonel: Brigadier J. S. A. Carr-Smith
- Notable commanders: Lt Gen Sir Adrian Carton De Wiart; Lt Gen The Lord Baden-Powell; Maj Gen Patrick Cordingly

Insignia
- Tactical Recognition Flash
- Tartan: Ulster (pipes)
- Arm Badge: 4/7 Dragoon Guards flash From 4th/7th Royal Dragoon Guards
- Abbreviation: RDG

The Royal Dragoon Guards (RDG) is a cavalry regiment of the British Army. It was formed in 1992 by the amalgamation of two other regiments: The 4th/7th Royal Dragoon Guards and the 5th Royal Inniskilling Dragoon Guards. Based in Battlesbury Barracks, Wiltshire, the unit currently serves as the armoured cavalry reconnaissance regiment of 20th Armoured Brigade. The regiment is equipped with the Warrior armoured fighting vehicle, and is transitioning to the new Ajax vehicle.

== History ==
The regiment was formed in 1992 by the amalgamation of two other regiments: The 4th/7th Royal Dragoon Guards and the 5th Royal Inniskilling Dragoon Guards. The Royal Dragoon Guards has served in a variety of roles and theatres since its formation. Historically dragoons were flexible soldiers, who fought on and alongside their mounts.

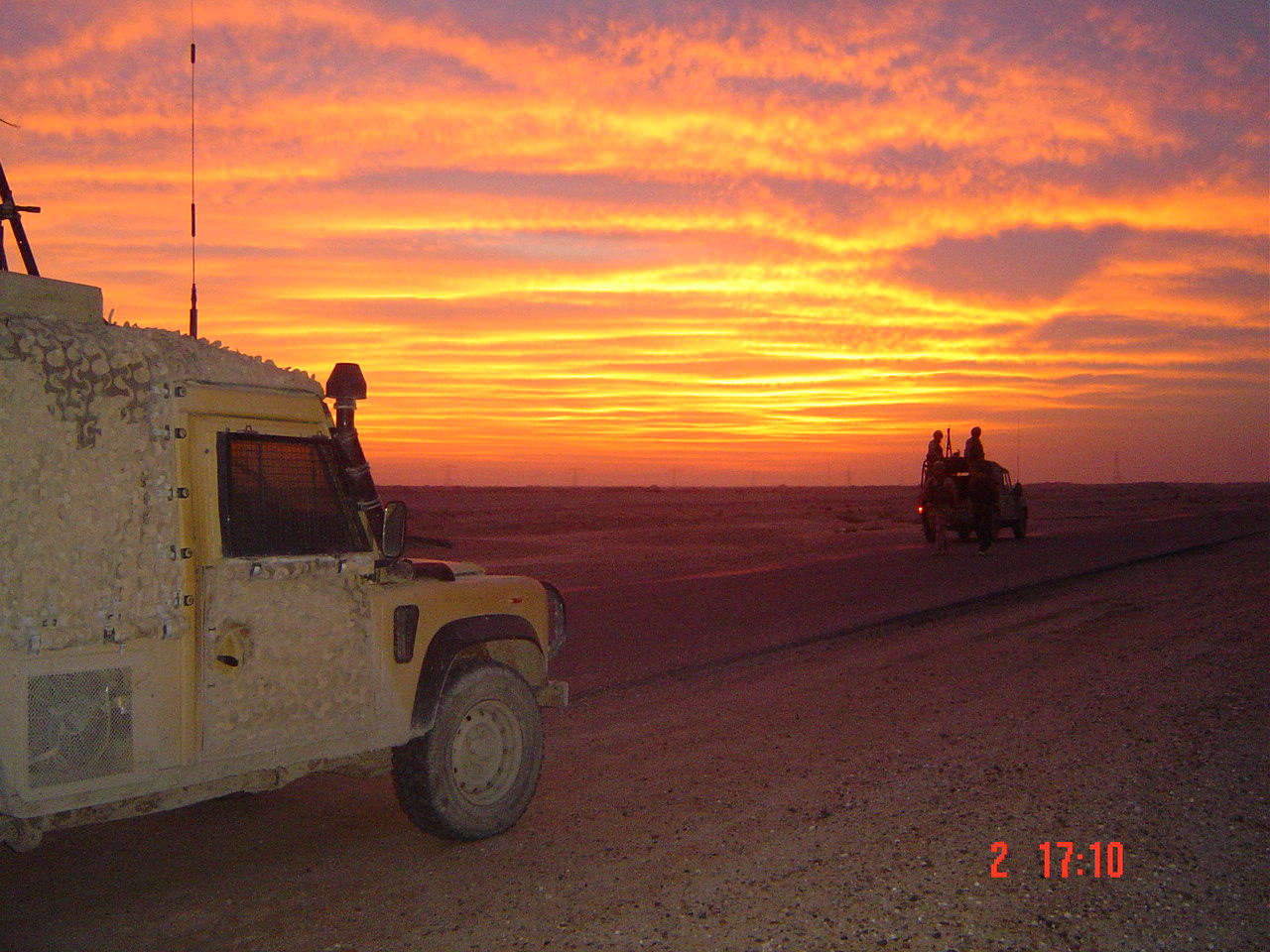
The RDG on patrol in Southern Iraq during Operation Telic 5.

=== Northern Ireland ===
In February 1996, three squadrons of the regiment deployed to Northern Ireland as part of Operation Banner, the UK military support to the civil authorities in the province. Two squadrons were employed as infantry in Belfast and the third acted as a prison guard force at the Maze Prison.

=== Balkans ===
In the winter of 1997, A Squadron, RDG, deployed with their Challenger 1s tanks to Barice in Bosnia (Op Lodestar) with the 9th/12th Lancers Battle Group. They were subsequently moved to Mrkonjić Grad and were employed, primarily in Land Rovers, to monitor former wartime factions and inspect cantonment sites.

=== UK ===
In early 2001 the regiment deployed as part of Operation Fresco (Zulu) to Cumbria and Yorkshire, with specialist Royal Navy teams, to provide emergency fire and rescue cover when the fire brigade was carrying out a programme of industrial action.

=== Iraq ===
The regimental Battle Group deployed to Iraq in 2004 (Operation Telic 5) and assumed control of the area south of Basra, close to the border with Kuwait. The main tasks were to mentor the newly formed Iraqi Police Force and provide security for the first presidential elections in the country since the US led invasion in 2003.

The regiment deployed again to Iraq towards the end of the United Kingdom's combat operations in 2007 (Op Telic 11), this time with Main Battle Tanks and Warrior Armoured Fighting Vehicles were called upon to support Iraqi led efforts to re-impose control in Basra (Operation Charge of the Knights). During this Operation Sergeant CP Richards was awarded the Military Cross for outstanding leadership and gallantry in the face of the enemy. As commander of the lead tank, working for Left Flank Company Group, Scots Guards Battle Group, he deployed on a joint arrest operation with Iraqi Security Forces in Al Quiblah, Basra. He fought his way through 5 improvised explosive device detonations, showing courageous restraint to minimise any civilian casualties, onto the target.

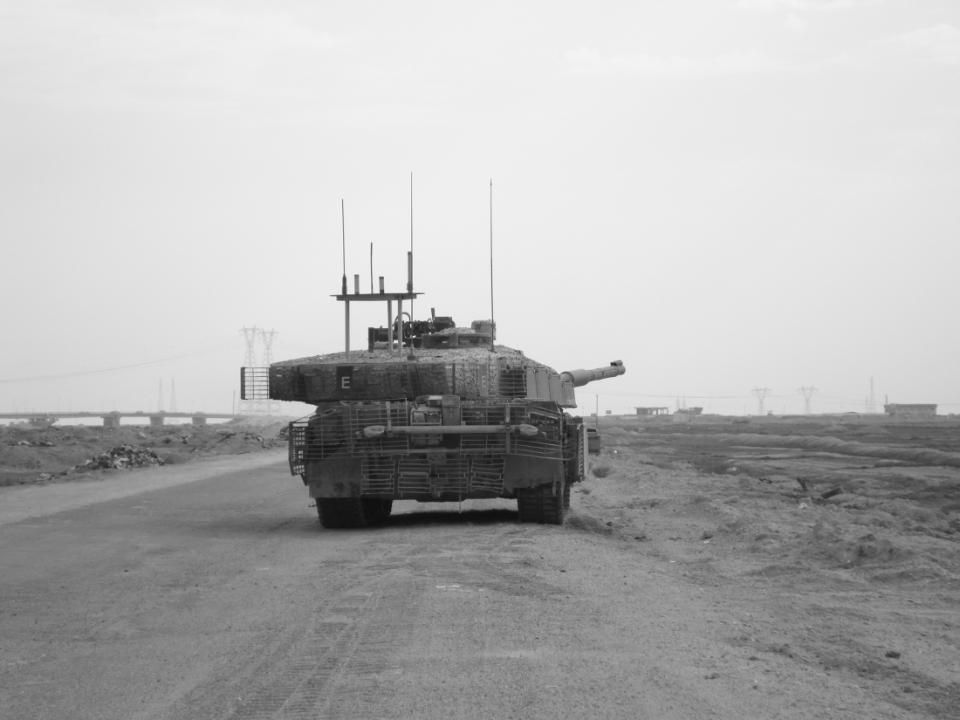
A Challenger 2 from the Royal Dragoon Guards on Operation Charge of the Knights

During this deployment, squadrons from the regiment assisted the Iraqi Border Agency to provide security on the Border with Iran and mentored Iraqi Army Units.

=== Afghanistan ===
The regiment deployed to Afghanistan in the spring of 2010 (Operation Herrick 12) to assist in bringing stability to Central Helmand and to provide security for the country's second Presidential Elections. Squadrons from the Regiment provided protected mobility support in the Mastiff (also known as Cougar), Viking (Bv 206), Ridgeback and Warthog armoured vehicles and held ground in Nad Ali District Centre following Op Moshtorak. Tasks of these squadrons included: providing route security, assisting in reconstruction work and clearing insurgents from southern Nad Ali. The regiment had four men killed in action during the tour. Acting corporal Mathew Stenton, one of those killed, was posthumously awarded the Military Cross for bravery. As a Viking commander he moved his vehicle forward to engage insurgents to assist in the evacuation of a friendly casualty, his citation reads: "A/Cpl Stenton's gallantry was of the very highest order and he made the supreme act of self-sacrifice to save a comrade's life".

The Regiment subsequently went on to complete a second tour of Afghanistan in 2013. The Regiment's role was to provide institutional and individual development advice and training to the Afghan National Police in Helmand. During this second tour The Royal Dragoon Guards also deployed a mounted manoeuvre squadron, operating on Warthog armoured vehicles.

Following the 2012 announcement of Army 2020 structures, the RDG has adopted an 'Armoured Cavalry' role equipped initially with Scimitar 2 the latest iteration of the CVR(T) platform. The Regiment moved to Warminster in November 2020, as announced by the Secretary of State for Defence in March 2016.

== Squadrons and organisation ==
The regiment has now been subject to changes implemented through the Army 2020 plan. Despite the re-roleing of the regiment from heavy armour to a new capability of Armoured Cavalry, many traditions have been maintained. The four squadrons of The Royal Dragoon Guards take their history and traditions from the four antecedent regiments that make up the current regiment.

In the new RDG organisation, there are three sabre squadrons and HQ:

- The Blue Horse, fire support squadron;
- The Black Horse, anti-tank squadron;
- The Green Horse, reconnaissance squadron;
- HQ (Duke of Edinburgh) Squadron.

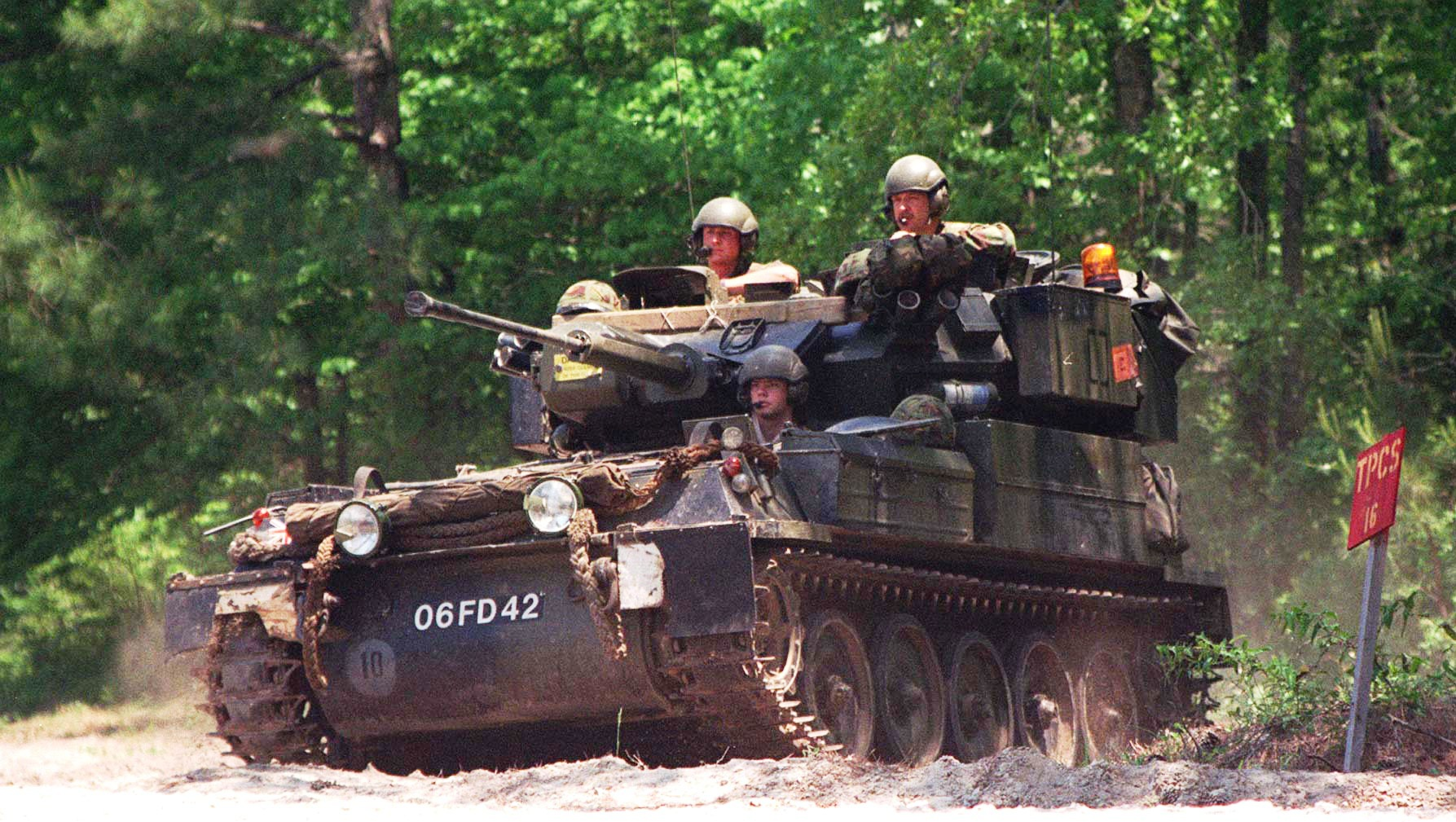
The CVR(T) Scimitar

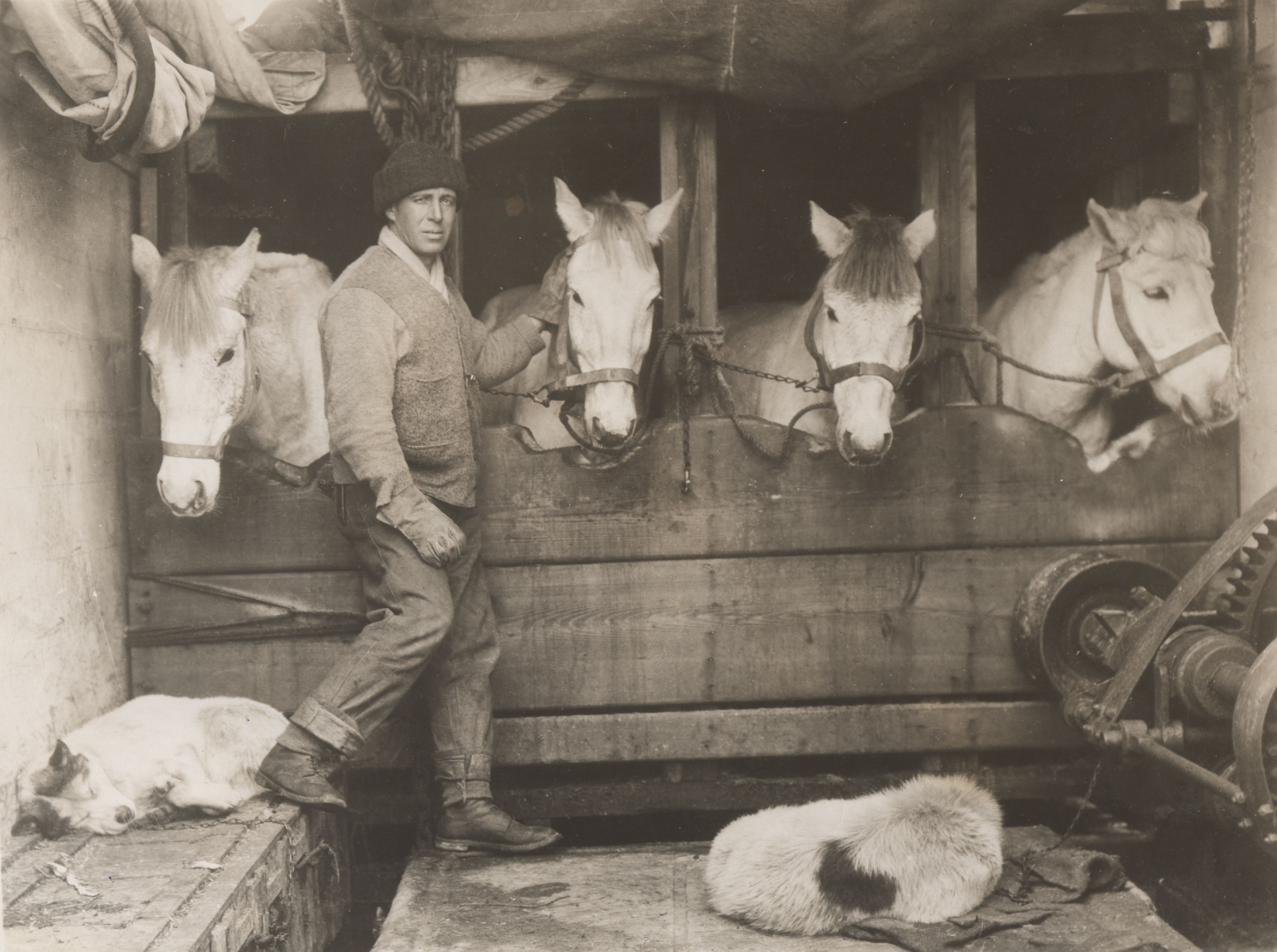
Lawrence Oates tending horses during the Terra Nova Expedition

== Regimental traditions ==
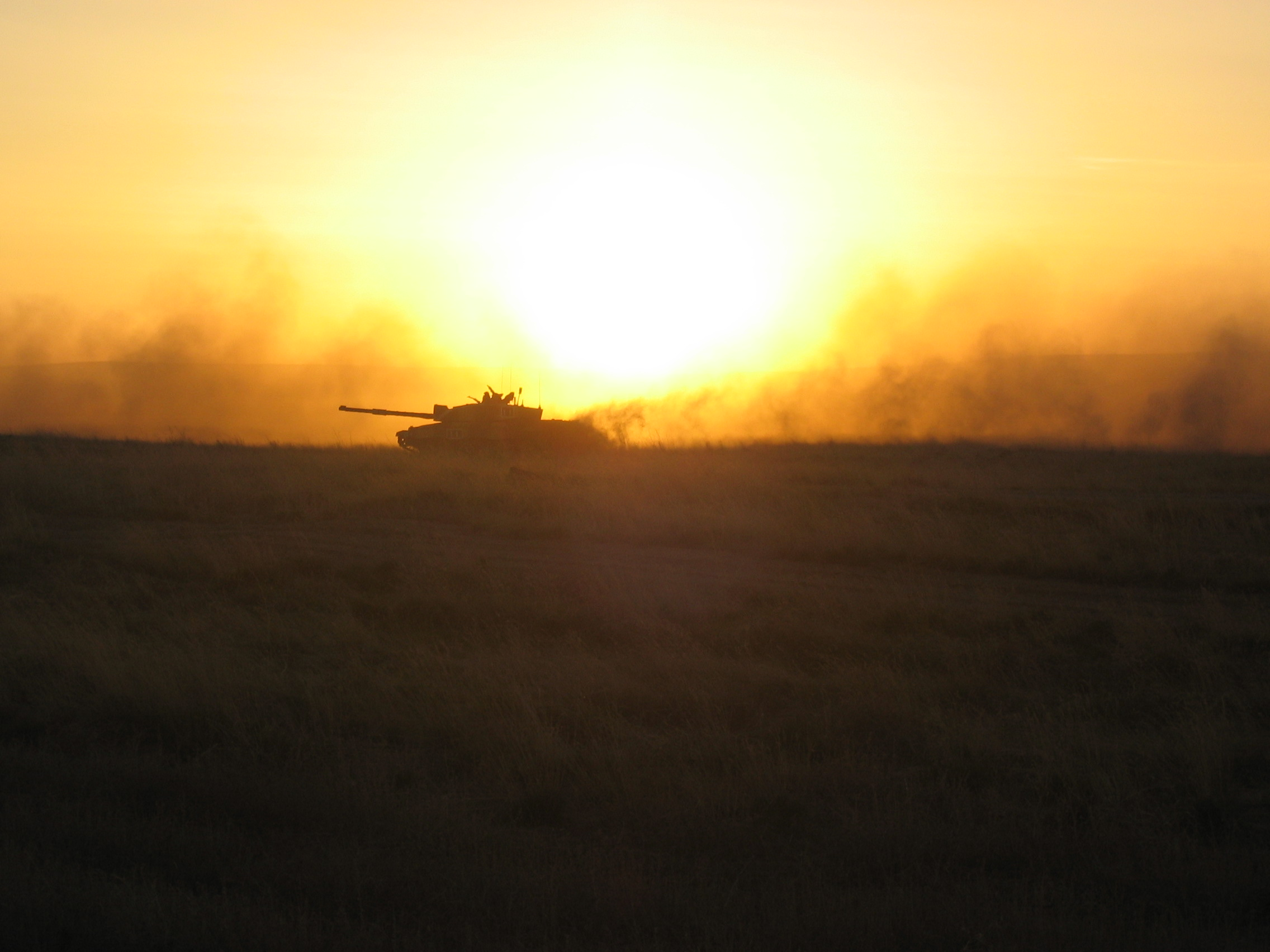
The RDG on exercise in Canada, 2004

Because of its lineage through the 5th Royal Inniskillings and the 4th/7th Royal Dragoon Guards—the 4th had been known as the 4th Royal Irish Dragoon Guards and the 7th also had Irish ancestry—the RDG retains strong links to Northern Ireland.

Dettingen Day

At the Battle of Dettingen, 27 June 1743, Cornet Richardson of Ligonier's Horse, later the 7th Dragoon Guards, received 37 wounds while defending the Regimental Standard. The Regiment remembers the day with dinners in the Messes and a families weekend.

Oates' Sunday

Captain L E G Oates, of the 6th Inniskilling Dragoons, became a legend of self-sacrifice when, as a member of Scott's ill-fated Antarctic Expedition of 1912, he chose to sacrifice himself rather than impede the progress of his comrades. The annual commemoration of Oates' brave action takes place on the Sunday closest to St Patrick's Day – the date of his birthday. It takes the form of a formal parade and church service, where the story of Oates is retold to inspire members of the Regiment.

St Patrick's Day – 17 March

The Regimental Flash

St Patrick's Day is celebrated by the RDG in respect to the Irish traditions it possesses. The Day is a regimental holiday and starts with the Officers and Senior Non-Commissioned Officers waking the men with bagpipes and 'gunfire' (tea laced with whiskey). A Regimental Lunch of Irish Stew is served and every member of the Regiment is presented with shamrock. This latter tradition has been maintained every year regardless of which theatre the Regiment is serving in.

The Regimental Flash

Flashes in Regimental colours were linked to regiments who were involved in the Second World War. The 4/7 DG first wore their flash in 1939 in Northern France in support of the British Expeditionary Force, one of the first armoured units to fight in the desperate but gallant withdrawal to Dunkirk and it is believed to be the first regiment to wear a Tactical Recognition Flash. The worsted material recognition flash came about following an order to remove badges of recognition from battle-dress to conceal regimental identity. The design was copied from the painted diamond flash in Regimental colours on the steel helmets. The order was later rescinded but the cloth badge remained. The 13/18H later followed suit in 1940 with a blue and white flash.

The 4/7 DG Regimental flash was worn by the ranks of Warrant Officer Class 2 and below on BD/SDs upon the left arm 1" below the shoulder seam. (Or 1/8" below the formation badge when one was worn on BDs). The flash is still worn today by the Regiment on Service Dress.

Green trousers

The regiment's practice of wearing green trousers in various orders of dress (other than combat uniform) was inherited from the 5th Royal Inniskilling Dragoon Guards, which had adopted it as a former (eighteenth-century) custom of one of its precursors, 5th (Princess Charlotte of Wales's) Dragoon Guards ('the Green Horse').

Regimental Pipes and Drums

Since the regiment's formation in 1992, a regimental pipes and drums has existed.

== Regimental museum ==
The York Army Museum (for the Royal Dragoon Guards, Prince of Wales's Own Regiment of Yorkshire and the Yorkshire Regiment) is based at the Tower Street drill hall in York.

== Battle honours ==
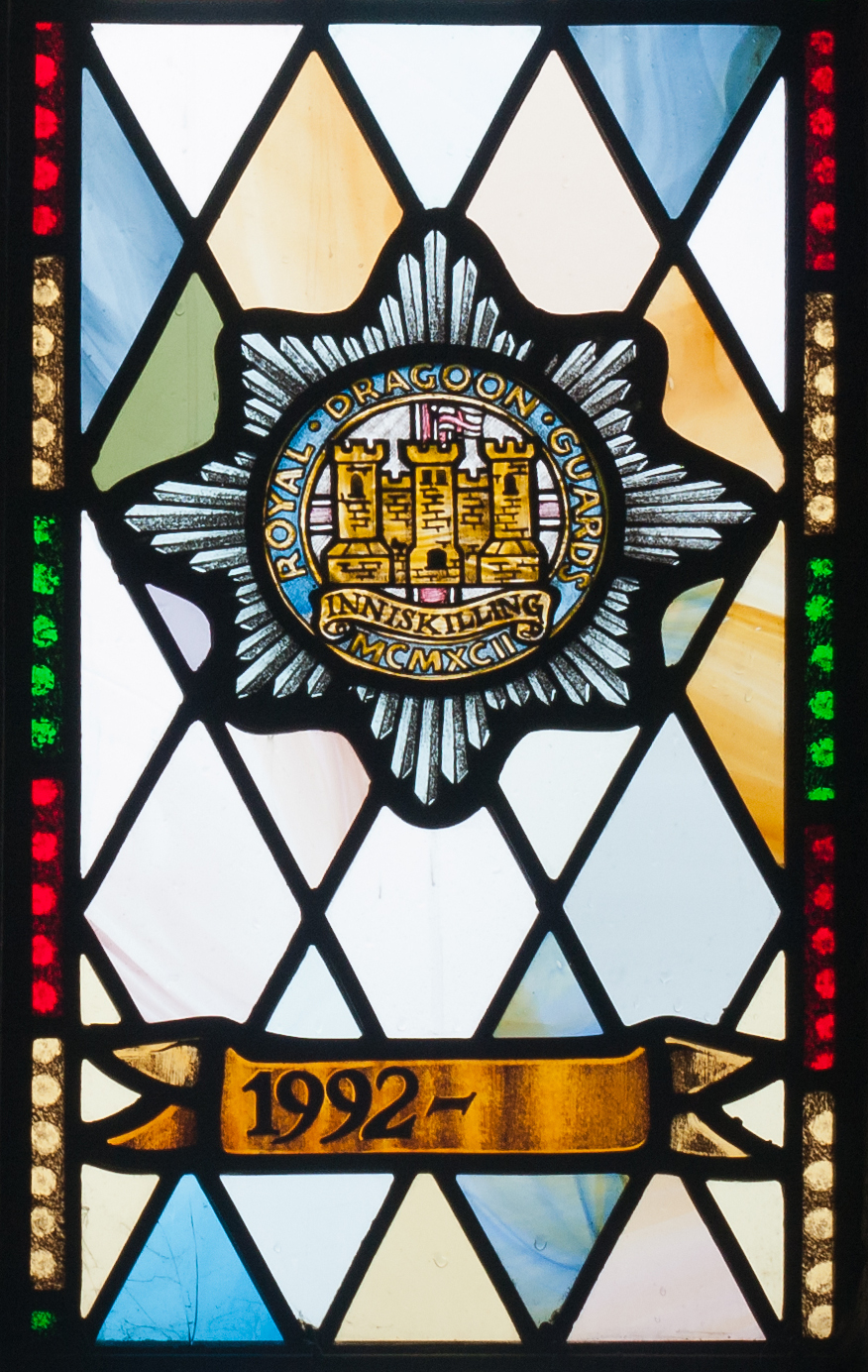
Memorial window at St Macartin's Cathedral, Enniskillen

The regiment and its predecessors have been awarded the following 79 battle honours:

Early Wars – Blenheim, Ramillies, Oudenarde, Malplaquet, Dettingen, Warburg, Beaumont, Willems, Salamanca, Vittoria, Toulouse, Peninsula, Waterloo, South Africa 1846–47, Balaclava, Sevastapol, Tel el-Kebir, Egypt 1882, Defence of Ladysmith, South Africa 1899–1902.

The Great War – Mons le Cateau, Retreat from Mons, Marne 1914, Aisne 1914, La Bassee 1914, Messines 1914, Armentieres 1914, Ypres 1914, Ypres 1915, Givenchy 1914, St Julien, Frezenberg, Bellewaarde, Somme 1916, 1918, Bazentin, Flers-Courcelette, Morval, Arras 1917, Scarpe 1917, Cambrai 1917 1918, St Quentin, Rosieres, Avre, Lys, Hazebrouck, Amiens, Albert 1918, Hindenburg Line, St Quentin Canal, Beaurevoir, Pursuit to Mons, France and Flanders 1914 – 18.

The Second World War – Dyle, Withdrawal to Escaut, St Omer-La Bassée, Dunkirk 1940, Normandy Landings, Odon, Mont Pincon, St Pierre la Vielle, Lisieux, Risle Crossing, Seine 1944, Nederrijn, Lower Maas, Geilenkirchen, Roer, Rhineland, Cleve, Rhine, Ibbenburen, Bremen, North West Europe 1940, 1944 – 45.

The Hook 1952, Korea 1951 – 52.

== Other information ==
The regiment was based in Paderborn, Germany when it was formed in 1992, and was part of 20th Armoured Brigade. In 1996 it returned to the United Kingdom, being based at Tidworth. It returned to Germany in 2000, being based in York Barracks Münster as part of 4th Armoured Brigade (later 4 Mechanized Brigade). In 2008, the Regiment returned to the United Kingdom and moved to Alma Lines Catterick Garrison and in 2014 it resubordinated back to 20th Armoured Brigade. In 2019, it joined 1st Armoured Infantry Brigade in advance of the most recent move to Battlesbury Barracks Warminster in 2020.

=== Colonels-in Chief ===
- 1992–2023: King Charles III
- Since 2023: Prince Edward, Duke of Edinburgh KG KT GCVO CD ADC

=== Deputy Colonel-in-Chief ===
- 1992–2025: The Duchess of Kent GCVO

Regimental Colonels

- 1992–1994: Major General Patrick Guy Brooking, CB, MBE (ex 5th Inniskilling Dragoon Guards)
- 1994–2000: Lieutenant General Sir Anthony Richard Guy Mullens, KCB, OBE
- 2000–2004: Major General Patrick Anthony John Cordingley, DSO
- 2004–2009: Brigadier Clendon Douglas Daukes
- 2009–2014: Brigadier Edward John Torrens-Spence, CBE
- 2014–2019: Brigadier Nicholas Charles Tristram Millen, OBE
- 2019–2024: Major General Timothy D. Hyams, CB, OBE
- Since 2024: Brigadier J. S. A. Carr-Smith

=== Commanding Officers ===
Commanding Officers have included:

- 1992–1994: Lieutenant Colonel E. John Torrens-Spence
- 1994–1996: Lieutenant Colonel Mark W. B. Faulkner
- 1996–1998: Lieutenant Colonel Richard A. P. Cary
- 1998–2001: Lieutenant Colonel Nicholas C. T. Millen
- 2001–2003: Lieutenant Colonel Nicholas C. C. Freeman
- 2003–2005: Lieutenant Colonel Jonathan N. A. Cray
- 2005–2008: Lieutenant Colonel Timothy D. Hyams
- 2008–2010: Lieutenant Colonel James C. A. Carr-Smith
- 2010–2013: Lieutenant Colonel F. A. James Piggott
- 2013–2015: Lieutenant Colonel Thomas J. Bateman
- 2015–2018: Lieutenant Colonel James J. S. Lane
- 2018–2019: Lieutenant Colonel Ben K. Watts
- 2019–2022: Lieutenant Colonel Dominic R. T. Davey
- 2022–2024: Lieutenant Colonel Martin P. Morrissey
- 2024–2026: Lieutenant Colonel David T. Brooks
- 2026–present: Lieutenant Colonel Bryn Williams

=== Freedoms ===
- City of York
- Enniskillen

== Lineage ==
1881 Childers Reforms	1922 Amalgamations	1990 Options for Change – today
4th (Royal Irish) Dragoon Guards	4th/7th Royal Dragoon Guards	Royal Dragoon Guards
7th (Princess Royal's) Dragoon Guards	4th/7th Royal Dragoon Guards	Royal Dragoon Guards
5th (Princess Charlotte of Wales's) Dragoon Guards	5th Royal Inniskilling Dragoon Guards	Royal Dragoon Guards
6th (Inniskilling) Dragoons	5th Royal Inniskilling Dragoon Guards	Royal Dragoon Guards

== Alliances ==
- Australia – 3rd/9th Light Horse (South Australian Mounted Rifles)
- Australia – 4th/19th Prince of Wales's Light Horse
- Canada – The British Columbia Dragoons
- Canada – The Fort Garry Horse
- India – 9th Horse (The Deccan Horse)
- New Zealand – Queen Alexandra's Mounted Rifles
- Pakistan – 15th Lancers (Baloch)
- Royal Navy – HMS Superb
- Royal Navy – HMS Daring
- Belgium – Régiment des Guides
- France – 12e Régiment de Cuirassiers

=== Affiliated Yeomanry ===
- The Cheshire Yeomanry (Earl of Chester's)
- The North Irish Horse
- The Yorkshire Yeomanry

== Order of precedence ==
Preceded by The Royal Scots Dragoon Guards (Carabiniers and Greys)	Cavalry Order of Precedence	Succeeded by The Queen's Royal Hussars (Queen's Own and Royal Irish)

== Sources ==
- Chappell, Mike (1987). The British Army in the 1980s. Osprey. ISBN 978-0850457964.
