= Small Arms School Corps =

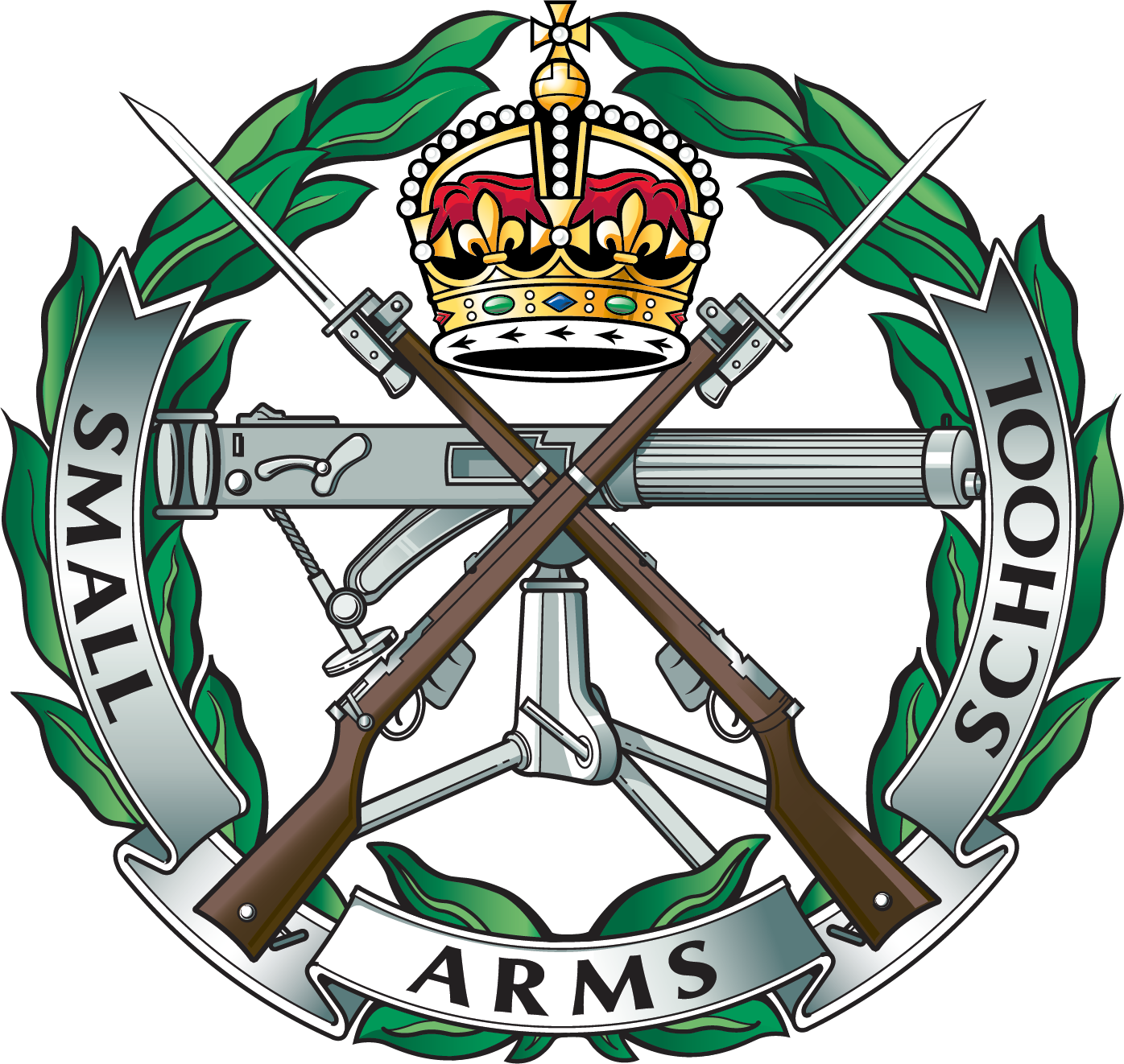
- Small Arms School Corps cap badge
- Active: 1853 – present
- Country: United Kingdom
- Branch: British Army
- Role: Advising, instructing and maintaining the proficiency in the use of small arms
- Garrison/HQ: Waterloo Lines, Warminster
- March: March of the Bowmen from the Robin Hood suite

Commanders
- Commanding Officer: Lt Col S Dunn SASC
- Colonel of the Regiment: Lt Gen C Collins DSO OBE
- Corps Sergeant Major: WO1 (CorpsSM) B Alcorn SASC
- Notable commanders: Sir Harold Ruggles-Brise

Insignia
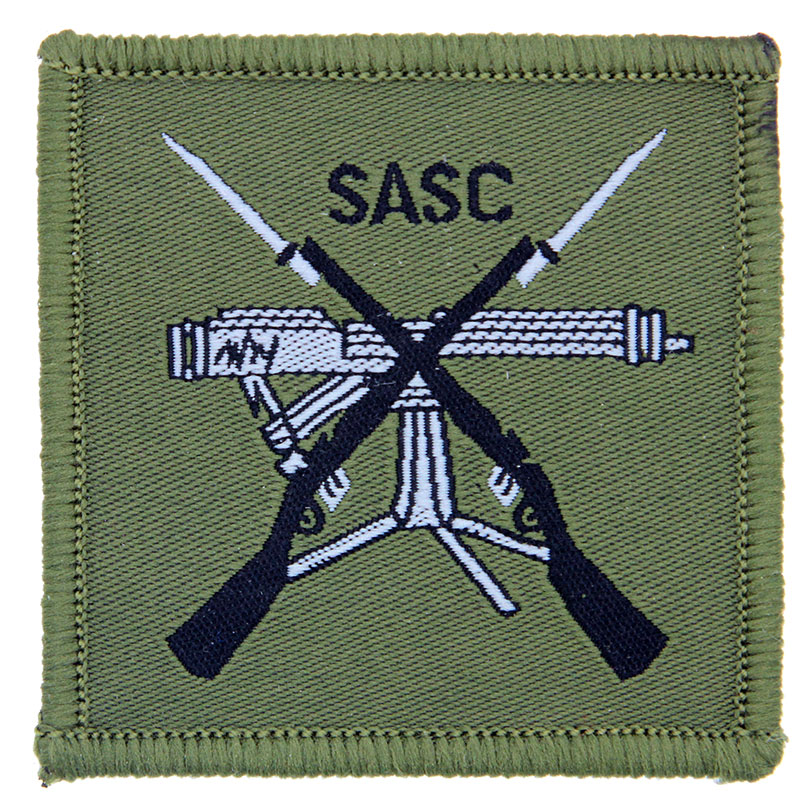
- Tactical Recognition Flash

The Small Arms School Corps (SASC) is a small corps of the British Army, established in 1853 by Lord Hardinge. Its personnel provide advice and instruction to infantry weapon trainers throughout the army, in order to maintain proficiency in the use of small arms and support weapons, and in range management.

== History ==
Prior to 1838, the majority of British soldiers were issued with the "Brown Bess" Land Pattern Musket, a smooth-bore, muzzle loading black powder flintlock musket which had seen service in one form or another since 1722.

In 1849, Claude-Étienne Minié produced the Minié rifle, although still a muzzle loader three important advances were incorporated. Firstly, it has a rifled bore; secondly used an expanding bullet that improved accuracy out to 600 yd (550 m) and greatly reduced reloading time; and thirdly incorporated percussion cap ignition of the black powder charge. Re-equipment of the army with this new firearm, which was adopted in 1851, continued through to 1855.

The consequence of this was that the army now had a weapon that was more accurate, at a longer range, was quicker to load and was marginally safer for the user as to ignition. For the first time since the demise of the bow and arrow, lethal marksmanship was possible. Shooting ceased to be a drill and became an art based on personal skill. Elevation, windage and ballistics now played a part. In order to study these new problems and introduce a shooting doctrine for instruction in rifle shooting it was decided to form a special corps of experts, who would also develop and improve the rifles and those whom use them. In March 1853, the Army Estimates included the sum of £1,000 (about £109,900 today) for Lord Hardinge to form an "Establishment for the instruction of the Army in rifle and target practice."

=== Foundation ===
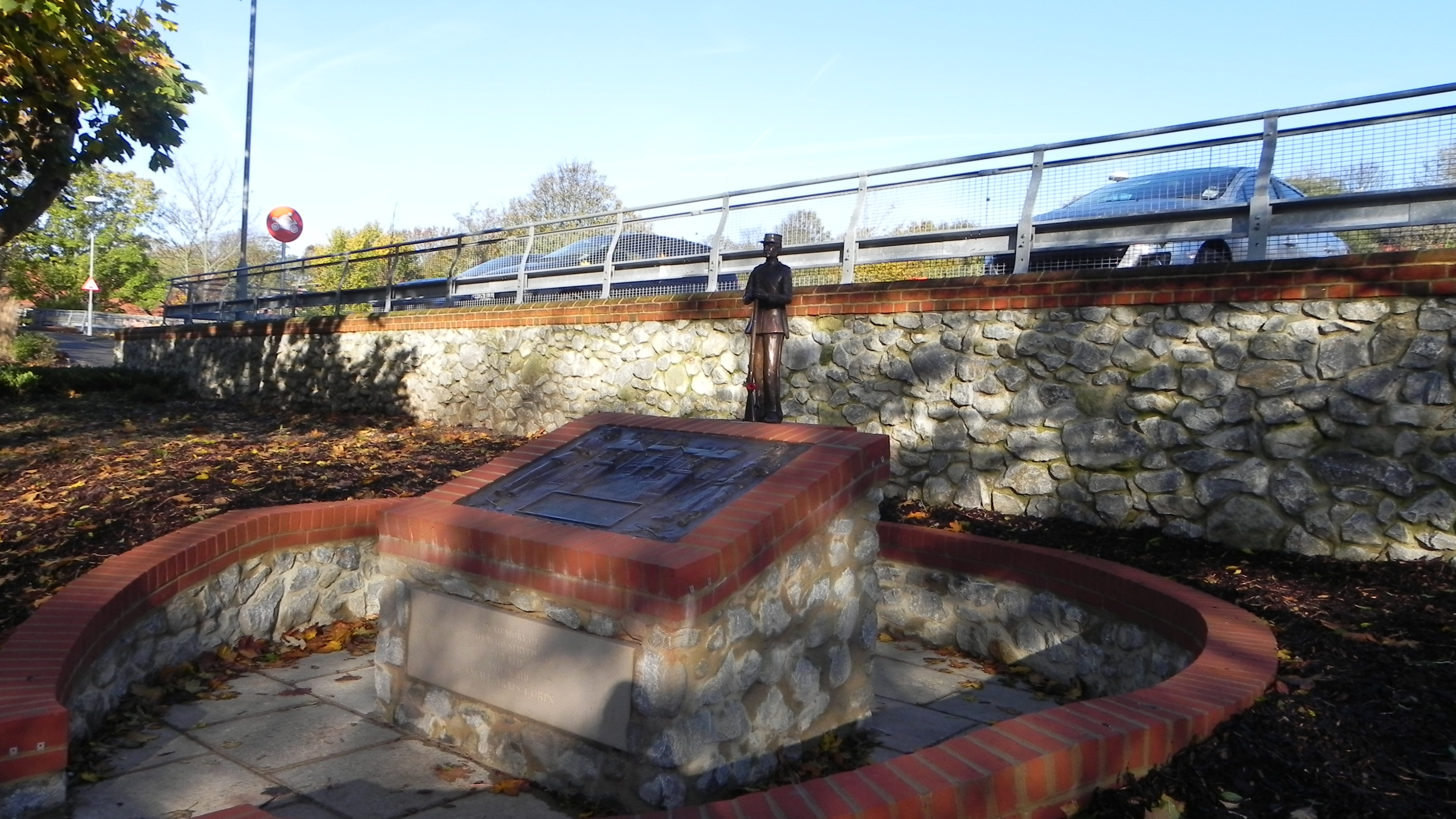
Small Arms School Memorial at Hythe, Kent

In June 1853, Colonel Hay arrived at Hythe, Kent, with a small staff of officers. On 1 August, the first instructor, Colour Sergeant MacKay of the 19th Foot, was appointed. By 15 September, a further three instructors were on strength. They were Sergeant Ruston (3rd Battalion Grenadier Guards), Sergeant Lobes (2nd Battalion Grenadier Guards) and Sergeant Morris (97th Regiment). The first mention of the establishment of the school was in the Army List of 1854 when it was referred to as the School of Musketry.

In September 1855, a corps of Instructors was added to the establishment, consisting of 100 First Class and 100 Second Class Instructors who, as soon as they were sufficiently experienced (except for three who remained at Hythe), were distributed to Depot Battalions and Regiments as required. These men were the Corps of Instructors of Musketry, a misnomer as muskets were being withdrawn from service – yet the art of the use of long arms to this day is sometimes known as musketry.

A separate school of musketry was established at the North Euston Hotel in Fleetwood in 1861, but it closed after just six years.

=== Later developments ===
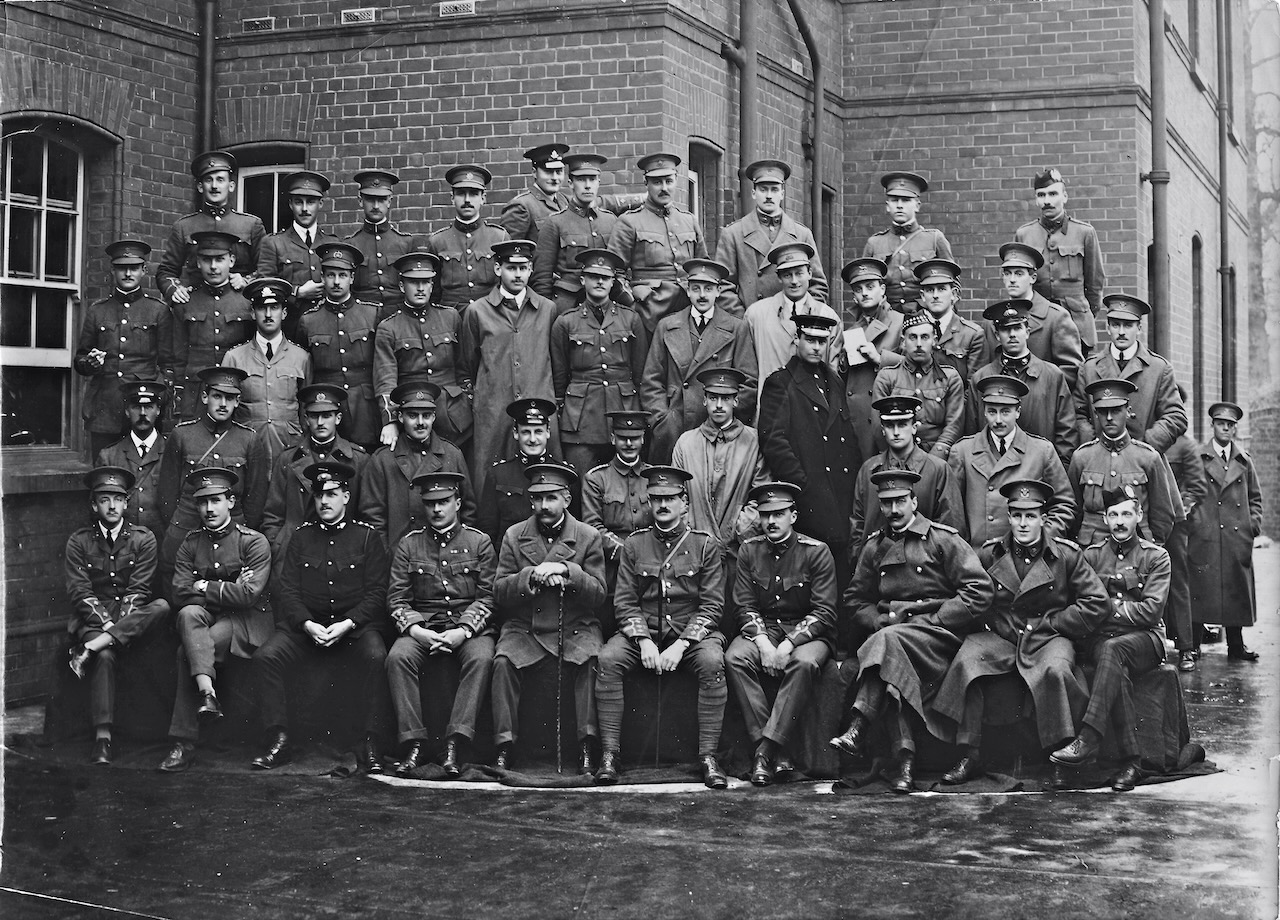
Photo of officers attending the Rifle course at the School of Musketry, Hythe, Kent, 5th November 1912.

Machine Gun Training Centres had been established in 1914 at Grantham and by the BEF in Wisques, France. This was followed on 14 October 1915 by the creation of the Machine Gun Corps (MGC). Originally equipped with the Maxim gun, these were replaced by the Vickers machine gun shortly after formation of the Corps. In 1919, the name of the School of Musketry at Hythe was changed to the Small Arms School.

In 1926, the school expanded to include the Machine Gun School at Netheravon, in 1931 absorbing the Chemical Warfare School at Winterbourne Gunner as the Anti-Gas Wing.

On the occasion of the centenary of the Corps in 1953, March of the Bowmen from the Robin Hood Suite by Frederic Curzon was adopted as the Corps March.

In 1969, the school moved from Hythe to the Army training establishment at Warminster (now Waterloo Lines), and was joined in 1995 by the wing from Netheravon.

The headquarters of the SASC remains at Warminster to this day.

=== Badge ===
The first badge of the school was crossed rifles surmounted by the king's crown. In 1929, the badge merged with that of the Machine Gun Corps, which consisted of two crossed Vickers machine guns, surmounted by the king's crown. This led to the current cap badge being created: a Vickers machine gun, surmounted by a crown and surrounded by a laurel wreath. The title Small Arms School Corps came into being at this time.

== Recruitment ==
The SASC does not directly recruit civilians, and only accepts applications from soldiers who are already qualified Skill at Arms (Weapons) Instructors serving in the British Army. Volunteers transfer to the SASC from all arms and services, although primarily from the Infantry.

== Order of precedence ==
Preceded by Royal Army Veterinary Corps	Order of Precedence	Succeeded by Intelligence Corps
