= Battlesbury Barracks =

Army installation in Wiltshire, England

- Warminster
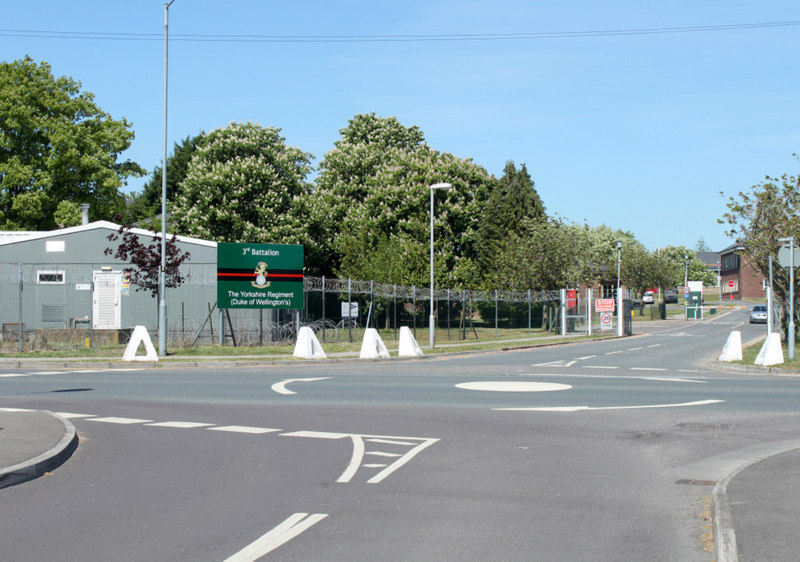
- Entrance to Battlesbury Barracks

Site information
- Type: Barracks
- Owner: Ministry of Defence
- Operator: British Army

Location
- Location within Wiltshire
- Coordinates: 51.2034°N 2.1605°W

Site history
- Built: 1938
- Built for: War Office
- In use: 1938-Present

Garrison information
- Occupants: Royal Dragoon Guards, 2nd Battalion Royal Yorkshire Regiment

Battlesbury Barracks is a British Army installation in Warminster, Wiltshire, England. It is the permanent base of the Royal Dragoon Guards, serving as armoured cavalry.

== History ==
The barracks is on the eastern outskirts of the town, near the ancient Battlesbury Camp hill fort, and was first occupied by the Welch Regiment in 1965.

On 9 December 2005 the barracks was taken over by the Duke of Wellington's Regiment on their return to the UK from Belfast Barracks in Osnabrück, Germany, as their permanent UK base.

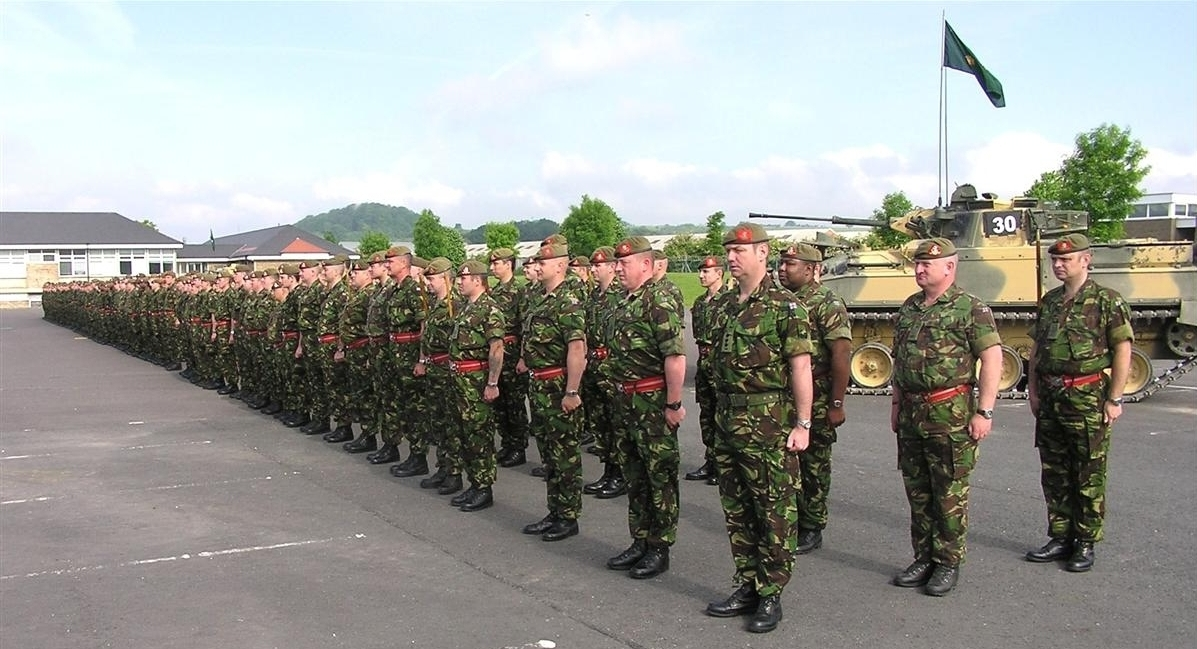
Dukes' final morning parade before re-badging (6 June 2006)

In December 2004, as part of the re-organisation of the infantry, it was announced that the Duke of Wellington's Regiment would be amalgamated with the Prince of Wales's Own Regiment of Yorkshire and the Green Howards, all Yorkshire-based regiments in the King's Division, to form the 1st, 2nd and 3rd Battalion of the new Yorkshire Regiment. The re-badging parade took place on 6 June 2006 and the 'Dukes' formally became the 3rd Battalion Yorkshire Regiment (Duke of Wellington's).

In 2009, the extent of the site was 29 hectares (72 acres).

In 2013, under the Army 2020 changes, the Green Howards Battalion (2nd) in Cyprus was to be disbanded. The soldiers were merged into the 1st (PWO), Battalion in Germany and the 3rd (DWR) Battalion on 25 July 2013. The 3rd Battalion was then renumbered as the new 1st Battalion (1 Yorks), whilst the PWO Battalion took over the Colours of the 2nd Battalion (Green Howards) and renumbered as the new 2nd Battalion (2 Yorks).

In November 2020, as part of the broader Defence level rebasing plan, 1 Yorks moved to Catterick Garrison conducting a straight swap with the Royal Dragoon Guards who moved to Battlesbury Barracks.

In Summer 2024, 2nd Battalion Royal Yorkshire Regiment moved to the camp from Dale Barracks near Chester.

== Current units ==
The following units are currently based at the barracks:

British Army

- Royal Dragoon Guards
- 2nd Battalion, Royal Yorkshire Regiment

Defence Equipment & Support

- Joint Asset Management and Engineering Solutions (JAMES) Delivery Team

== See also ==
- Waterloo Lines – nearby army headquarters and training schools
