= Joseph Brome =

Joseph Brome may refer to:

- Joseph Brome (British Army officer, died 1796) (1713–1796), Master Gunner, St James's Park, the most senior Ceremonial Post in the Royal Artillery after the Sovereign
- Joseph Brome (British Army officer, died 1825), British Royal Artillery officer who served during the Napoleonic Wars
