= Robert Gardiner (British Army officer) =

General Sir Robert Gardiner GCB KCH
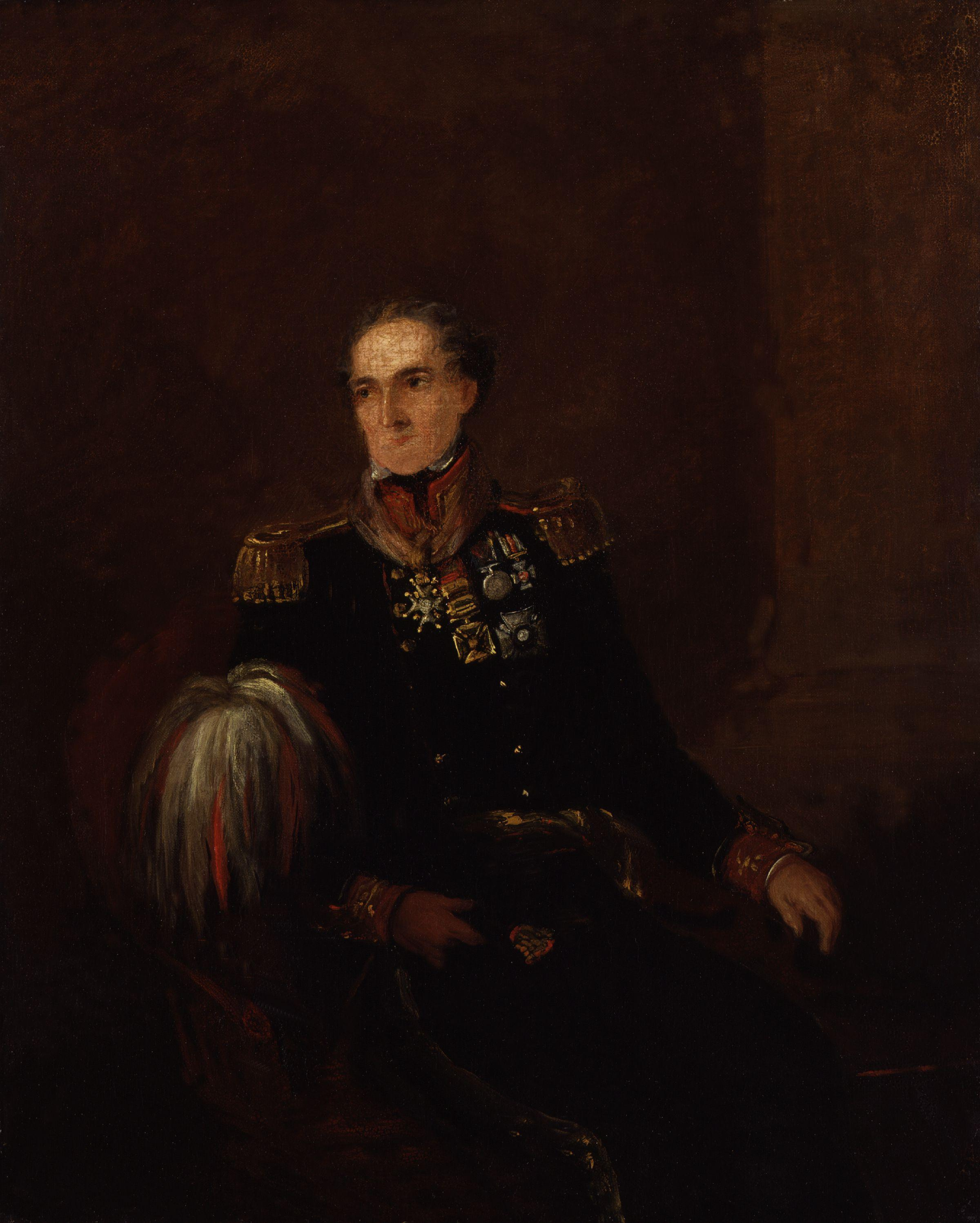
- Born: 2 May 1781
- Died: 26 June 1864 (aged 83); Esher, Surrey
- Burial place: Christ Church, Esher
- Military career
- Allegiance: United Kingdom
- Branch: British Army
- Service years: 1797–1864
- Rank: General
- Unit: Royal Artillery
- Conflicts: French Revolutionary Wars; Capture of Minorca; Napoleonic Wars; Hanover Expedition; Walcheren Expedition; Peninsular War; Battle of Rolica; Battle of Vimeiro; Battle of Corunna; Siege of Cádiz; Battle of Barrossa; Siege of Badajoz; Battle of Salamanca; Siege of Burgos; Battle of Morales; Battle of Vitoria; Battle of the Pyrenees; Battle of Orthes; Battle of Toulouse; Hundred Days; Battle of Quatre Bras; Battle of Waterloo
- Awards: Army Gold Medal; Order of Saint Anna (Russia); Order of Charles III (Spain)

General Sir Robert William Gardiner GCB KCH (2 May 1781 – 26 June 1864) was Master Gunner, St James's Park, the most senior ceremonial position in the Royal Artillery after the Sovereign.

== Military career ==
Educated at the Royal Military Academy, Woolwich, Gardiner was commissioned into the Royal Artillery on 7 April 1797 and that October was sent to Gibraltar, which was under partial blockade by the French fleet.

In November 1798 he was present at the Capture of Minorca under Charles Stuart. The following May he was appointed to the staff of the island's Mosquito Fort, where the French General Duc de Crillon had landed in 1782, and subsequently became aide-de-camp to General Henry Fox.

Following the 1802 Treaty of Amiens he returned to England, was promoted to second-captain in 1804 and the following year commanded 12 guns in an advance corps under Lieutenant-General George Don as part of Cathcart and Count Tolstoy's campaign in North Germany. The force advanced as far as Hanover before the Battle of Austerlitz forced their return home.

He joined the Marquis of Wellington's Army in 1812 and commanded a Field Battery at the Battle of Salamanca, the Capture of Madrid and the Siege of Burgos where with several of his men he volunteered for the trenches.

In 1813 he took command of E Troop Royal Horse Artillery and fought at the Battle of Vitoria, the Battle of Orthez and the Battle of Toulouse.

During the 1815 Corn Law Riots in London his troop helped to restore order then later that year he went to the Southern Netherlands.

At Quatre Bras "His troop was most severely pressed in covering the left of the army on the retreat" then on the 18th he commanded his troop at the Battle of Waterloo.

He became Principal Equerry to Prince Leopold of Saxe-Coburg-Saalfeld in 1816 and remained in that role until 1831. He was also aide-de-camp to the successive monarchs George IV, William IV and Queen Victoria. He held the position of Master Gunner, St James's Park from 1840.

He was appointed Governor of Gibraltar in 1848 and died in Esher, Surrey on 26 June 1864.

== Family ==
He was the youngest son of Captain John Gardiner of the 3rd Buffs and the brother of Lieutenant-General Sir John Gardiner, Colonel-in-Chief of the 61st Foot.

In 1816 Gardiner married Caroline Mary McLeod, eldest daughter of Lieutenant-General John Macleod and they had issue.

Government offices
| Preceded by Sir Robert Wilson | Governor of Gibraltar; 1848–1855 | Succeeded by Sir James Fergusson |
Honorary titles
| Preceded by Sir Alexander Dickson | Master Gunner, St James's Park; 1840–1864 | Succeeded by Sir Hew Dalrymple Ross |
