= James Spens =

James Spens may refer to:

- James Spens (British Army officer) (1853–1934), English cricketer
- James Spens (diplomat) (died 1632), Scottish adventurer and diplomat
