= Percy Drummond =

Major-General Percy Drummond CB (died 1843) was a British Royal Artillery officer during the Napoleonic Wars

== Biography ==
Percy Drummond was the son Duncan Drummond (Note: Duncan Drummond, was a Commanding Officer of the Royal Artillery, and Director General of the Field Train Department, and was buried in the church-yard of Plumstead.)

Drummond entered the Royal Artillery as 2nd Lieutenant on 1 January 1794, and consequently had been 49 years an officer of the corps. He was promoted to be 1st Lieutenant on 14 August 1794; and in 1795 he performed, in addition to his other duties, that of Quartermaster of his battalion. He was gazetted Captain on 7 October 1799; Major on 4 June 1811; Lieutenant Colonel on 12 August 1819; Colonel on 13 October 1827; and retired from connection with a battalion on being promoted to be Major General on 10 January 1837. At that period he was Lieutenant-Governor of the Royal Military Academy, Woolwich, which position be retained until May 1839, when he succeeded, on the death of Sir Alexander Dickson, as Director General of the Royal Artillery.

Drummond was at the Siege of Copenhagen in 1794–1795, He took part in the Walcheren Campaign in 1809 and was present at the capture of the Island of Walcheren, and siege of Flushing. He was also present with his company in Portugal, with Sir John Moore, until the embarkation of the troops after the Battle of Corunna, and was engaged in the Waterloo Campaign of 1815, including the battle of Waterloo.

Drummond died on 1 January 1843 at his residence in the Royal Arsenal, Woolwich.
