= Henry Horne, 1st Baron Horne =

Military officer in the British Army during the First World War

General The Right Honourable The Lord Horne GCB KCMG
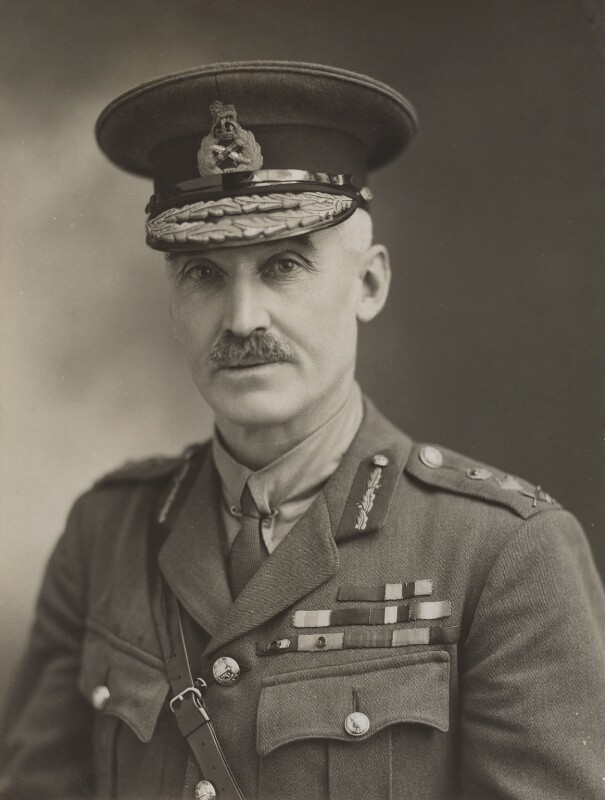
- Horne in 1917
- Born: 19 February 1861; Wick, Caithness, Scotland
- Died: 14 August 1929 (aged 68); Wick, Caithness, Scotland, United Kingdom
- Military career
- Allegiance: United Kingdom
- Branch: British Army
- Service years: 1880–1923
- Rank: General
- Unit: Royal Field Artillery
- Commands: Eastern Command; First Army; XV Corps; 2nd Division
- Conflicts: Second Boer War; First World War
- Awards: Knight Grand Cross of the Order of the Bath; Knight Commander of the Order of St Michael and St George; Mentioned in Despatches; Grand Officer of the Order of Leopold (Belgium); Croix de Guerre (France)

General Henry Sinclair Horne, 1st Baron Horne, GCB, KCMG (19 February 1861 – 14 August 1929) was a British Army officer, most notable for his generalship during the First World War, where he commanded at division, corps, and field army level, rising to command the British First Army in 1916, which he held until the armistice of 11 November 1918. He was the only British artillery officer to command an army in the war.

== Background and education ==
Horne was born on 19 February 1861 in the parish of Wick in Caithness, Scotland, the third son of Major James Horne and Constance Mary Shewell. He was first educated at Harrow, receiving an artillery commission from the Royal Military Academy, Woolwich in May 1880, when he was appointed a lieutenant in the Royal Field Artillery. Promotion to captain followed on 17 August 1888, and to major on 23 February 1898.

== Early military career ==
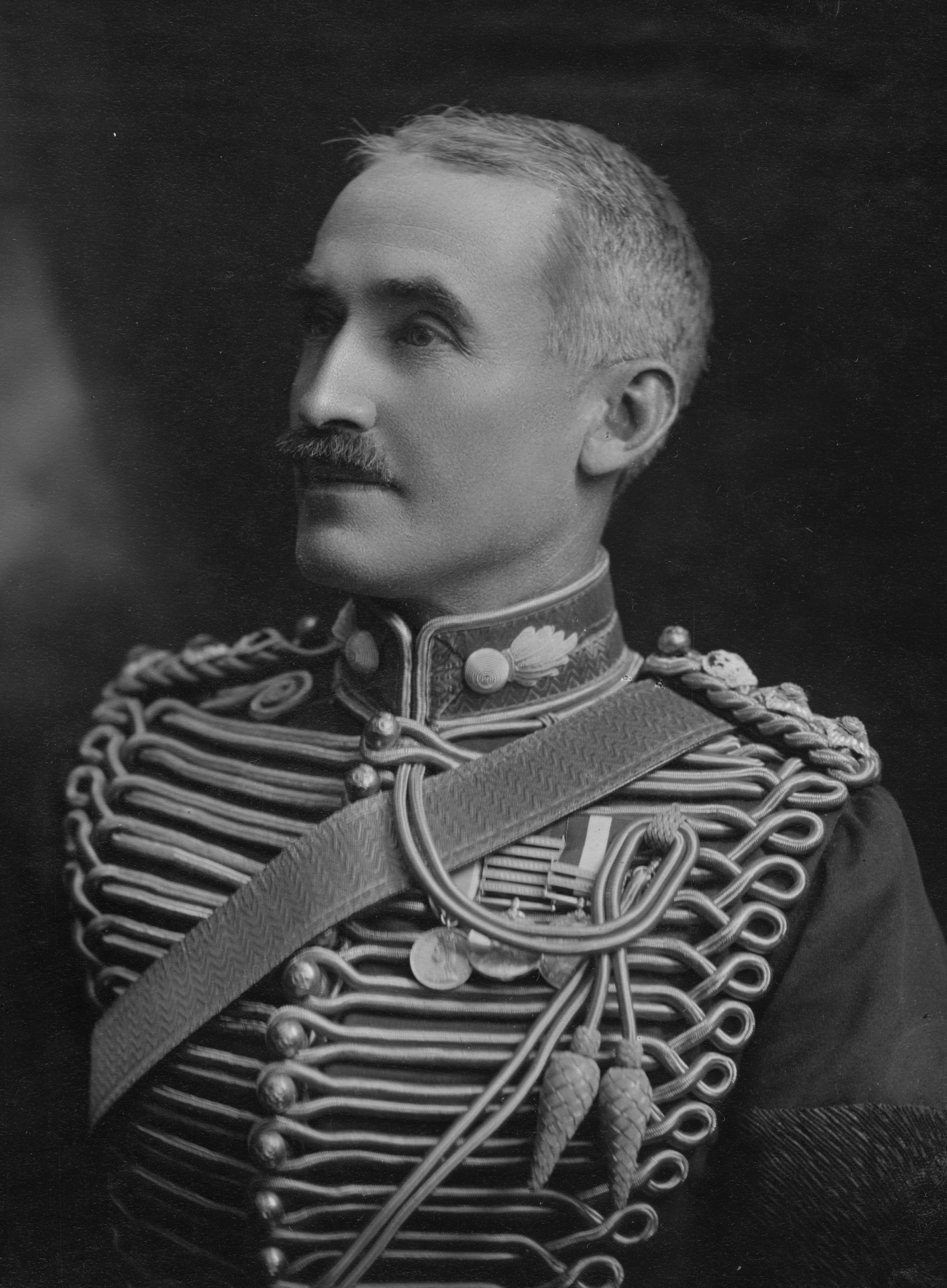
Henry Horne, presumably in the earlier stages of his military career.

From 1899 to 1902 Horne fought with the cavalry in the Second Boer War in South Africa under Sir John French. He received the brevet promotion to lieutenant colonel on 29 November 1900, and in the latter stages of the war served as a remount officer and was mentioned in despatches. Following the end of hostilities in June 1902 he returned to England, leaving Cape Town in the SS Norman which arrived in Southampton in late August that year.

In November 1905 he received a substantive promotion to lieutenant colonel and served with the Royal Horse Artillery (RHA) under Douglas Haig.

He was promoted to colonel and succeeded Frederick Wing as a staff officer for Royal Horse and Field Artillery in September 1910. His military career was unremarkable until May 1912 when he was promoted to temporary brigadier general and appointed inspector of royal horse and royal field artillery. He was made a CB in January 1914 in the 1914 New Year Honours.

== First World War ==
=== Belgium and France ===
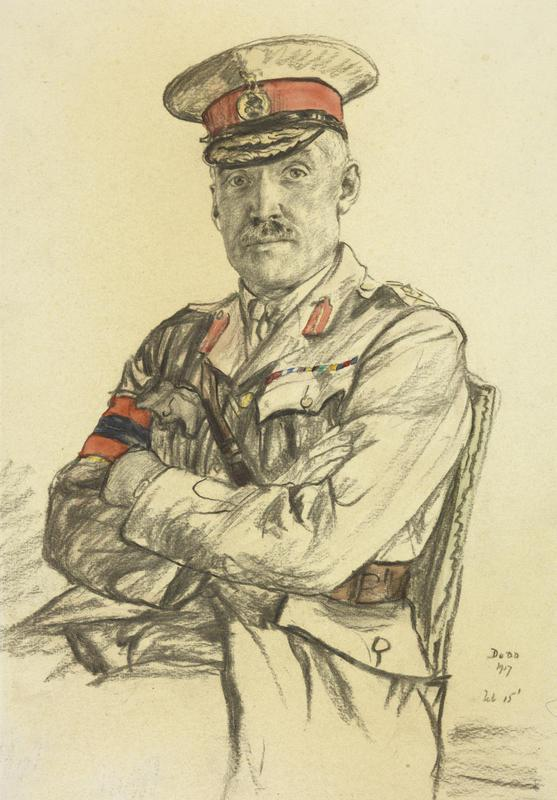
A half length portrait of General Sir Henry Horne in uniform and peaked cap, sitting on a chair with his arms folded.

War broke out in the summer of 1914 and Horne, after departing for service in France with the first wave of the British Expeditionary Force (BEF), "established a reputation as a skilful and experienced commander of artillery" whilst serving as BGRA to Lieutenant General Sir Douglas Haig, who commanded I Corps. At the Battle of Mons, Horne "was given command of the Corps rearguard by Haig and performed with great success".

Horne fought with distinction in the BEF's actions throughout 1914; in October of that year, he was promoted to major general, “for distinguished conduct in the Field”.

A few months later, in January 1915, he was given command of the 2nd Division.

This is very good news, the command of a Division is a great compliment for a gunner.

In May, Horne's division participated in the first British night attack of the war, distinguishing itself at the Battle of Festubert; the attack faltered, partly because the artillery ran out of ammunition. The media launched vicious attacks on the Secretary of State for War, Field Marshal Lord Kitchener; the blame was eventually laid on Field Marshal French who was forced to resign at the year's end. Significantly, the artillery were reorganised after this fiasco at Horne's suggestion. Under his command, the division also saw significant action during the Battle of Loos.

=== Middle East ===
In November 1915, Horne accompanied Lord Kitchener to the Dardanelles, where they organised and executed the evacuation of Gallipoli which took place in December 1915 and January 1916.

For several months after this, Horne was placed in charge of the Suez Canal defences (and given command of the XV Corps).

=== Western Front ===
==== Corps commander ====
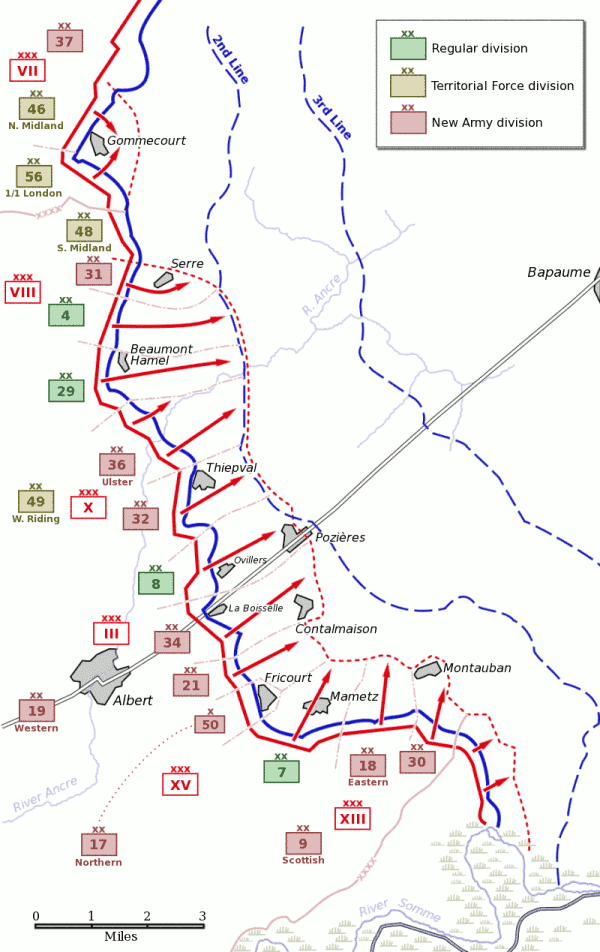
A map of the initial objectives - few of which were attained - of the Battle of the Somme. Horne's forces were located near the right flank of the attacking line.

In March 1916, two months after being promoted to the temporary rank of lieutenant-general, and still GOC XV Corps, he returned to the Western Front. His corps was allotted to General Sir Henry Rawlinson's Fourth Army, which was preparing for an attack in the Somme area. In the pre-battle plans, Horne advocated and became an architect of the "creeping barrage", a tactic that was used for the rest of the war.

On 1 July 1916, the first day on the Somme, Horne's XV Corps participated in the costliest British battle of the First World War. His force, consisting of the 7th and 21st divisions, attacked the villages of Fricourt and Mametz, capturing both on the first day, although suffering 7,500 casualties in the process.

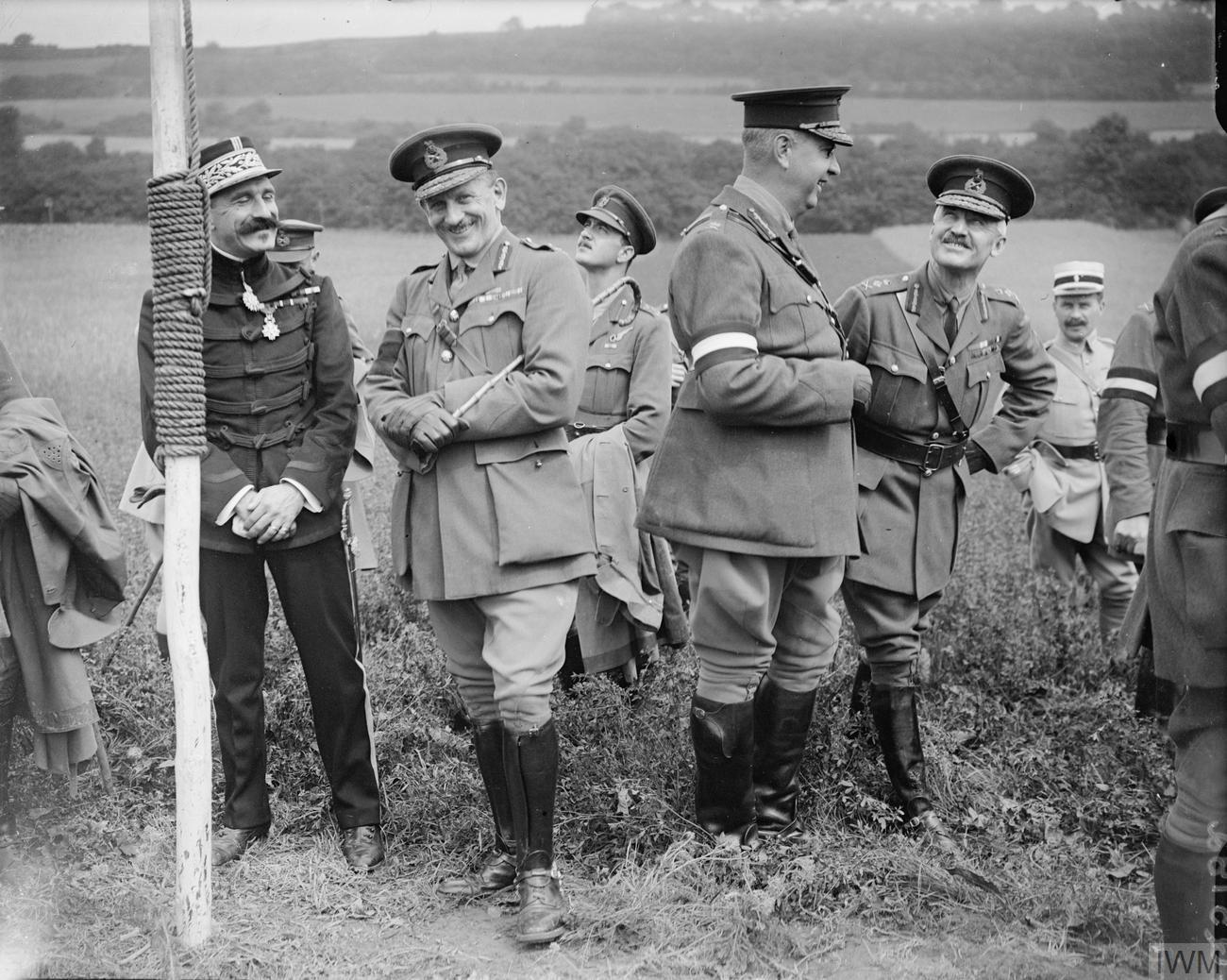
Lieutenant-General Sir Henry Horne, GOC British First Army, and Lieutenant-General Sir Arthur Currie, GOC Canadian Corps, at the First Army Commemoration Service of the beginning of the fourth year of the First World War, Ranchicourt, France, 5 August 1917. French officers are also present.

The divisions bypassed Mametz Wood, a position the Germans had heavily entrenched and needed to be captured to allow Horne's XV Corps to carry on the advance. As the 7th Division had suffered heavy casualties, the 38th (Welsh) Division was assigned to the corps and ordered to take the wood. Horne interfered in the division's efforts to attack the wood, issuing conflicting orders and going as far as to ordering a single platoon into action. Due to the miscommunication between Horne and the division's commander, Major General Ivor Philipps, was fired and replaced by the commander of the 7th Division, Major General Herbert Watts. Horne wrote a "self-serving" account of this event that did no justice to men of the division or the difficulties they had faced. On 9 July the Welsh launched a full-scale attack on the woods and cleared it by the following day. During their 6 days on the Somme, the Welsh division suffered 3,993 casualties. Historian Don Farr wrote that the reputation of the Welsh division suffered due to the repeated interference by Horne in matters best left to the divisional or brigade staff and his "inexperience of battlefield command at this level". With the wood cleared, Horne would lead his corps during the Bazentin Ridge, the Battle of Delville Wood, and the Battle of Flers–Courcelette.

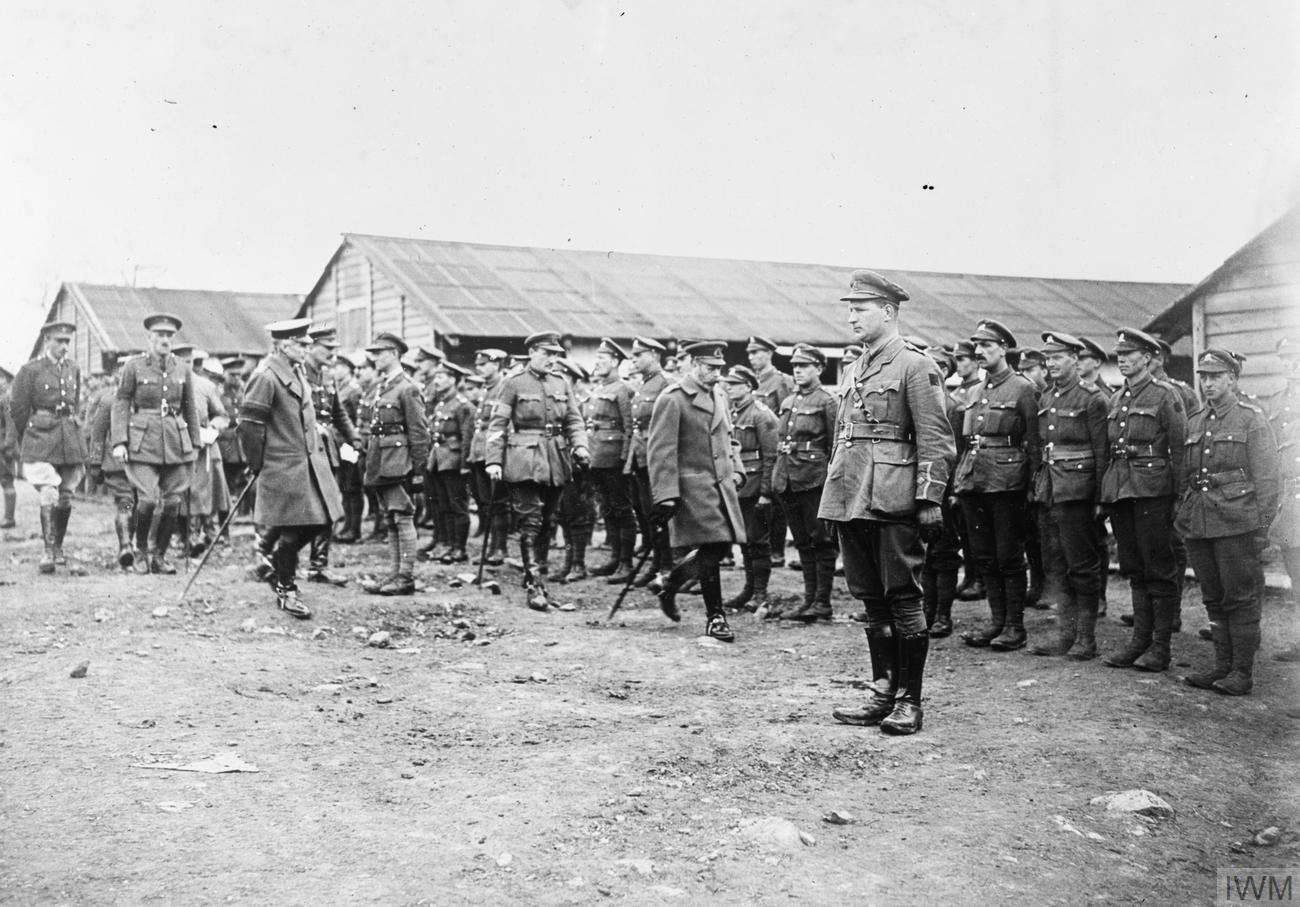
King George V and General Horne inspecting men of the 2/6th Battalion, South Staffordshire Regiment, 59th (2nd North Midland) Division, at Gauchin, 30 March 1918. They are accompanied by Brigadier General T. G. Cope and Major General Cecil Romer, GOC 59th Division.

==== Army commander ====
In September 1916, Horne was created a Knight Commander of the Order of the Bath. After the successful capture of Flers, he was promoted to temporary general and succeeded General Sir Charles Monro (after a brief hiatus between 7 August and 29 September when the command was held by Haig's first choice, Lieutenant General Richard Haking, who was then blocked from receiving the promotion) as commander of the First Army.

On 1 January 1917, he was promoted to the substantive rank of lieutenant general "for distinguished service in the field". His first trial occurred in April 1917, when his troops were sent on a diversionary attack on the fearsome Vimy Ridge, which rose hundreds of feet over the surrounding landscape. French Army commander Robert Nivelle was critical of Horne's plan; Nivelle was the one found incompetent and, after one month of relative failure (and the beginnings of the 1917 French Army mutinies), Nivelle was sacked and replaced with Philippe Pétain.

The attack on Vimy Ridge was spearheaded by the First Army's "shock troops" (the Canadian Corps, under Lieutenant Lieutenant General The Hon. Sir Julian Byng, later replaced by the Canadian Lieutenant General Arthur Currie). The ensuing Battle of Vimy Ridge, the first of a series of actions known as the Battle of Arras was successful: supported by Horne's 1,000-odd artillery pieces, the Canadian forces took the ridge in four days, with approximately 10,000 casualties (against 20,000 German casualties). The capture of Vimy Ridge would prove essential to the British Army: it served as the backbone of the British defence from March 1918 onwards.

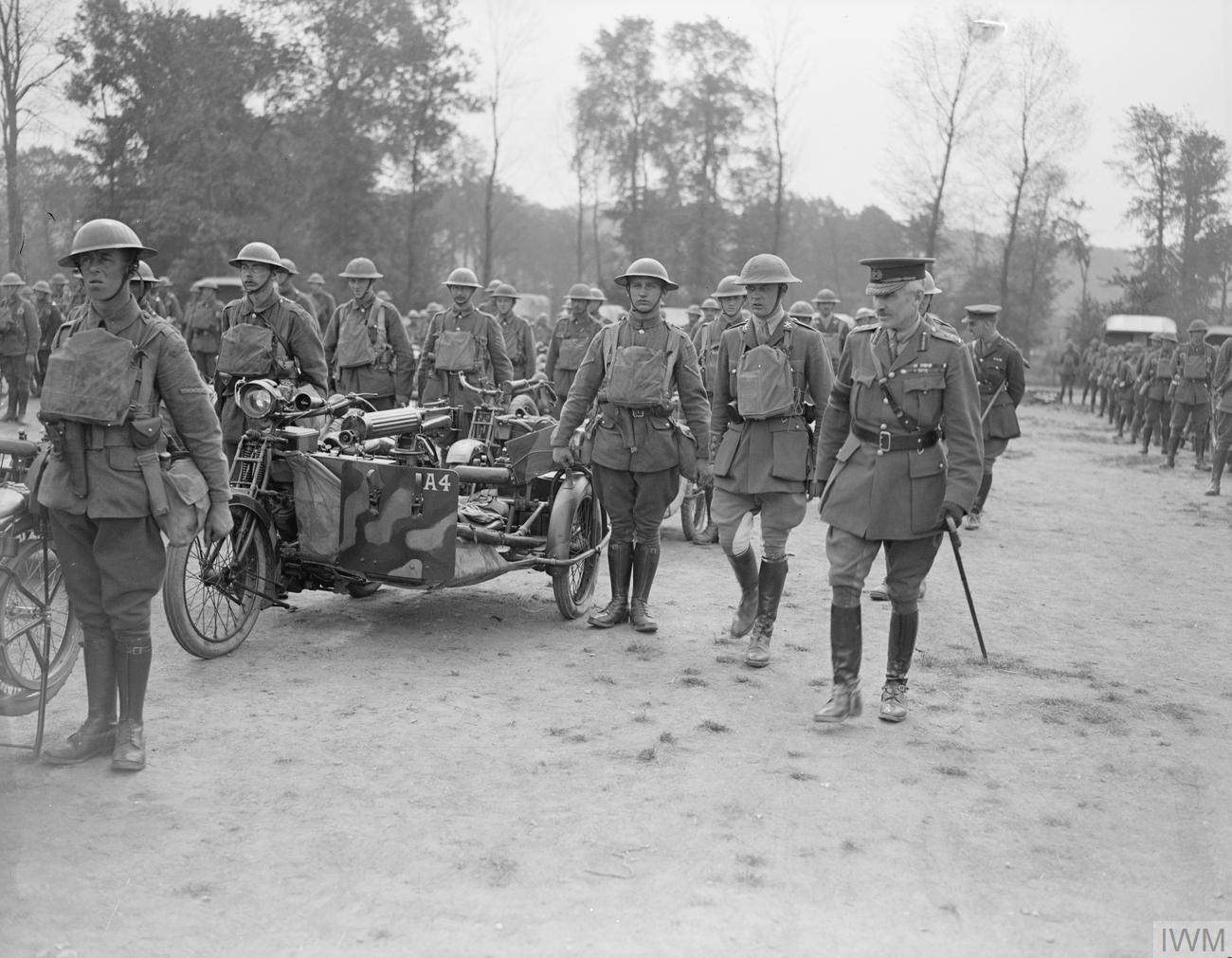
General Horne inspecting the 24th Motor Machine Gun Battalion, 24th Division, at Dieval, 12 June 1918. The motorbikes are Clyno 744 cc twin cylinder machines fitted with a sidecar and Vickers machine-guns.

Nivelle's failure and sacking lengthened the actions around Arras. With success imminent, Haig began siphoning troops northward, where many would participate in the Battles of Messines and Passchendaele. The First Army served mainly as a diversion and a placeholder until April 1918.

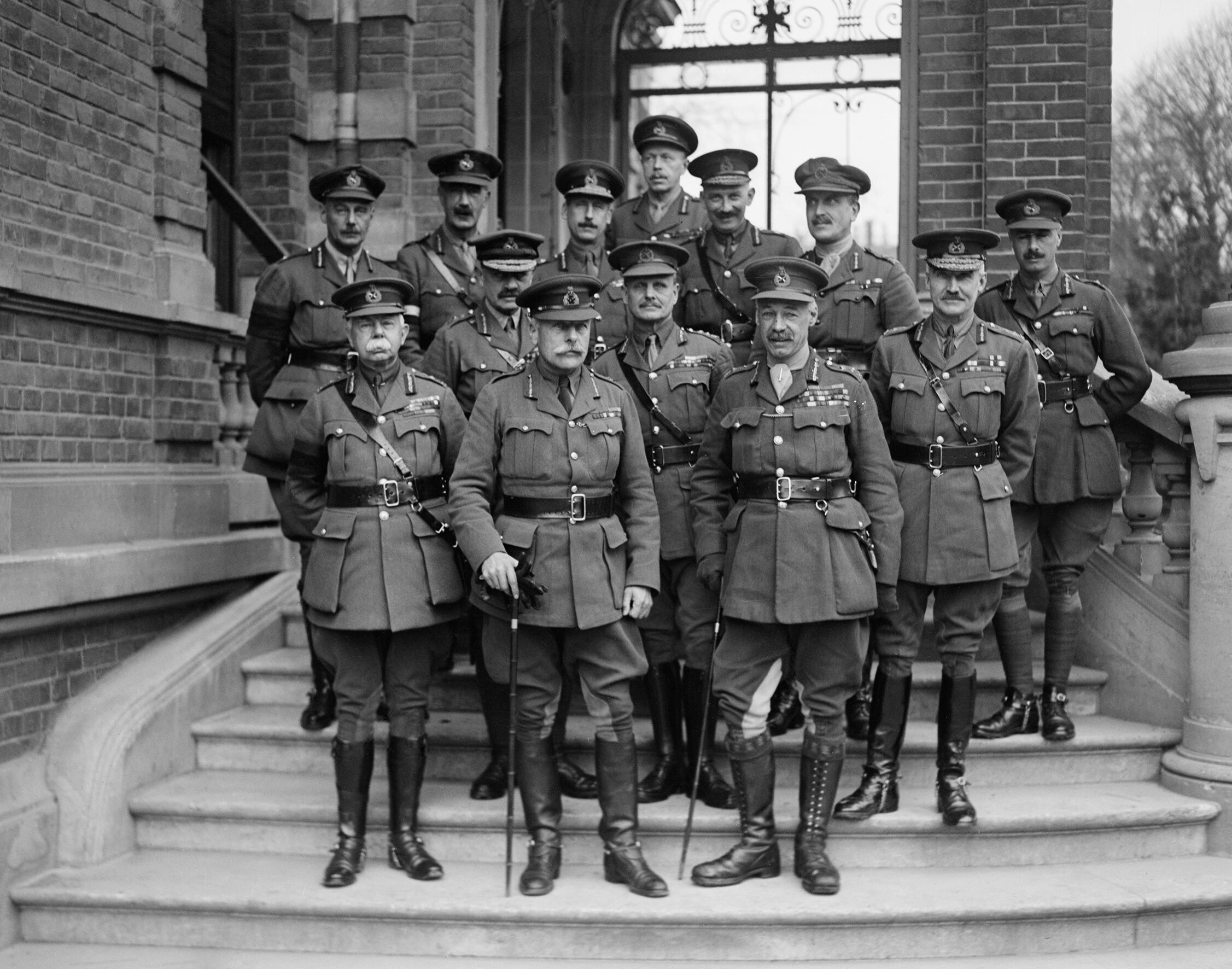
Field Marshal Sir Douglas Haig (centre front) with his senior commanders and staff officers at Cambrai, France, 11 November 1918. Stood in the second row, first on the right, is General Sir Henry Horne.

In April, the Germans embarked on the Spring Offensive which was similar to the Allied Somme Offensive two years previously. At first, the attack was successful. On Horne's front, nine German divisions attacked his weak left flank which was manned by two exhausted Portuguese divisions. The Germans advanced six miles to the banks of the River Lawe, where they were repulsed by the 55th (West Lancashire) and the 51st (Highland) divisions.

After this final German offensive, the British took the initiative permanently. Haig's forces embarked on the Hundred Days Offensive, which ended the war; Horne's troops distinguished themselves in the lengthy offensive.

On the last day of the war Horne wrote to his wife:

At 11 am today hostilities ceased! I think that we may well regard Nov 11 1918 as a red letter day, and it was on Nov 11 1914 that the I Corps, in which I held the appointment of Brigadier General Royal Artillery, defeated the great attack of the Prussian Guard. An attack which was planned to break down the British resistance and to open the road to Calais! Now the mighty German nation is completely humbled and the great German Army, which regarded itself as the most powerful fighting machine in the world, is in retreat to its own frontiers, broken and defeated!

== Post-war ==
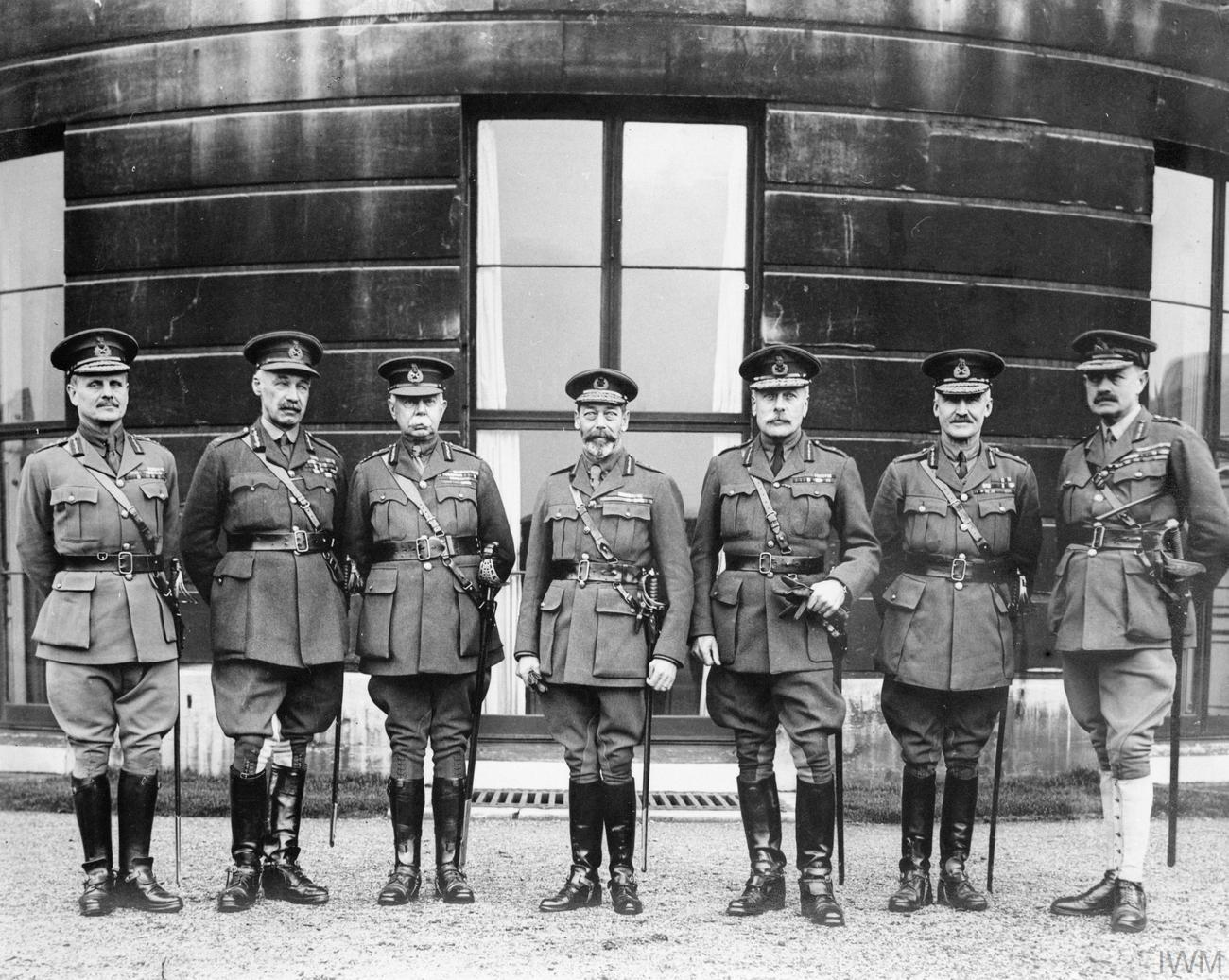
King George V (centre) with his senior commanders at Buckingham Palace, 19 December 1918. From left to right: William Birdwood, Henry Rawlinson, Herbert Plumer, George V, Douglas Haig, Henry Horne, Julian Byng.

At the end of the war, Horne was promoted to the substantive rank of general in January 1919 and created a Knight Commander of the Order of St Michael and St George and a Knight Grand Cross of the Order of the Bath. For his wartime services he received the thanks of Parliament and was raised to the peerage as Baron Horne, of Stirkoke in the County of Caithness. He was promoted to head of the Eastern Command in June 1919, made an aide-de-camp general to King George V in succession to General Sir William Robertson, in April 1920 and retired from the army in June 1926.

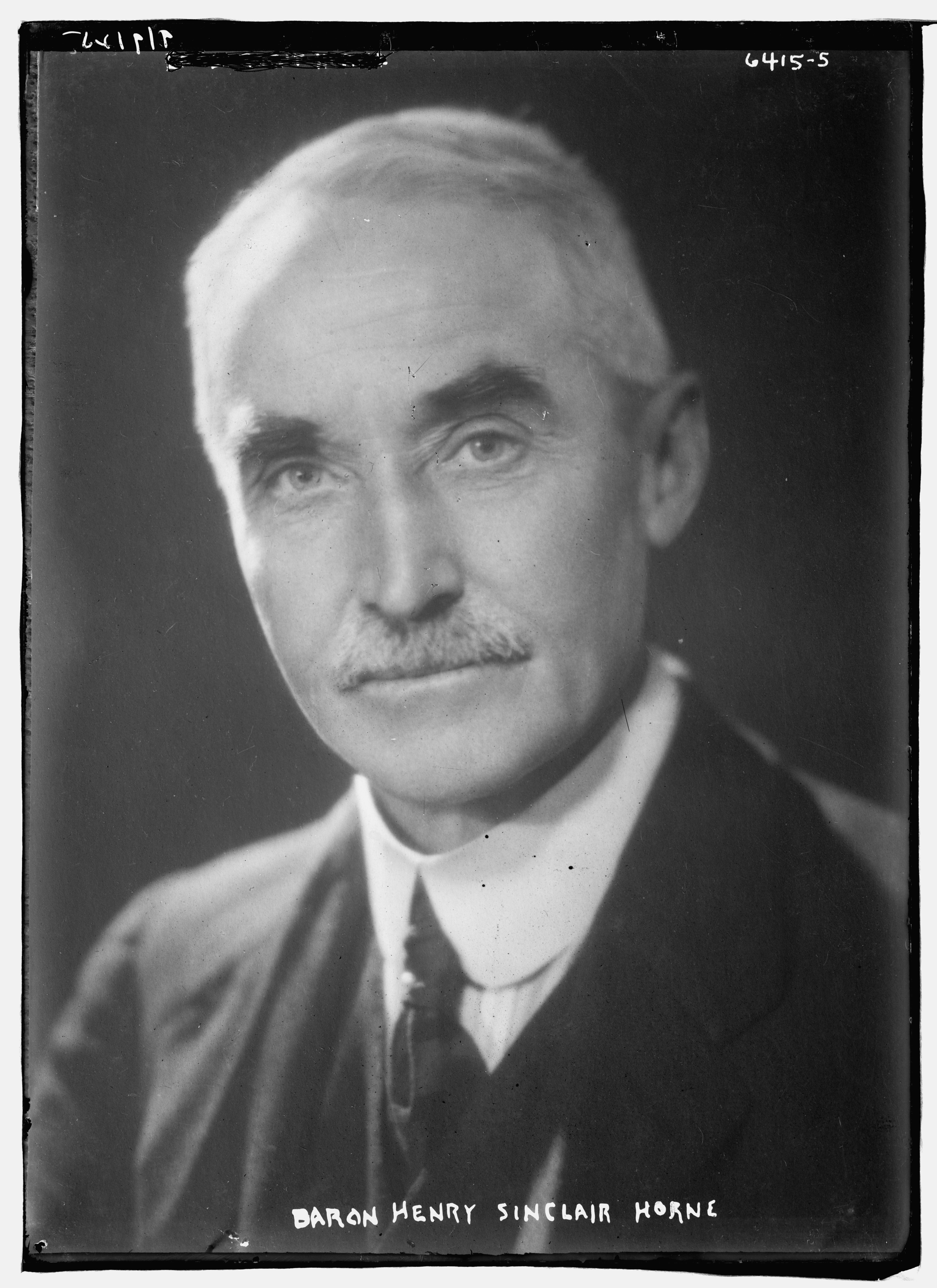
Baron Horne presumably in the 1920s.

On 30 July 1920, Horne was appointed a deputy lieutenant of Caithness. He was appointed Master Gunner of St. James's Park, an honorary position he would hold until his death; he was also appointed colonel of the Highland Light Infantry in May 1929. He was the deputy governor of the Church Lads' Brigade from November 1923 to February 1925, he then became governor and commandant until his death.

== Personal life ==
Lord Horne married Kate (1860-1947), fifth surviving daughter of George McCorquodale (1817-1895), in 1897.

While shooting in his Stirkoke estate in August 1929, he suddenly died of unknown causes, at the age of 68. He was buried on his family plot at Wick. Although by a special remainder his title could be inherited by a male grandchild, his only child, daughter Kate (also known as 'Kitten'), also only had daughters, so the title became extinct.

== Legacy ==
It was believed that he had not kept a diary and that his wife had destroyed all his letters after his death, although, in reality, his papers had been handed down to his granddaughters, who had kept them safe. The donation of his extensive papers, which include his diaries and letters, to the Imperial War Museum by the family has allowed his career to be re-evaluated.

== Bibliography ==
- Hesilrige, Arthur G. M. (1921). Debrett's Peerage and Titles of courtesy. 160A, Fleet street, London, UK: Dean & Son. p. 484.
- Beckett, Ian F. W.; Corvi, Steven J. (2006). Haig's Generals. Barnsley: Pen & Sword Military. ISBN 978-1-84415-169-1.
- Robbins, Simon (2010). British Generalship During the Great War The Military Career of Sir Henry Horne (1861-1929). Ashgate Publishing. ISBN 978-0754661276.
- Robbins, Simon (2009). The First World War Letters of General Lord Horne. History Press for the Army Records Society. ISBN 978-0752454634.
- Farr, Don (2007). The Silent General: Horne of the First Army A Biography of Haig's Trusted Great War Comrade-in-Arms. Helion. ISBN 978-1874622994.
- Neillands, Robin (1999). The Great War Generals on the Western Front 1914–1918. Robinson, 1999. ISBN 1841190632.

Military offices
Preceded by Charles Monro	GOC 2nd Division; 1914–1915	Succeeded by William Walker
New post	GOC XV Corps; 1915–1916	Succeeded by John Du Cane
Preceded by Sir Charles Monro	GOC First Army; 1916–1918	Post disbanded
Preceded by Sir Charles Woollcombe	GOC-in-C Eastern Command; 1919–1923	Succeeded by Sir George Milne
Honorary titles
Preceded by Sir Edward Chapman	Master Gunner, St James's Park; 1926–1929	Succeeded by Sir George Milne
Peerage of the United Kingdom
New creation	Baron Horne; 1919–1929	Extinct
Honorary titles
Preceded by Granville Egerton	Colonel of the Highland Light Infantry; 1929	Succeeded by Alfred Granville Balfour
