= 26th Infantry Brigade (United Kingdom) =

- Active: 1914-1919; 1939–1945
- Country: United Kingdom
- Branch: British Army
- Type: Infantry
- Engagements: Western Front; Burma Campaign

The 26th Infantry Brigade was the name of two British Army formations during the First World War and Second World War.

== First World War ==
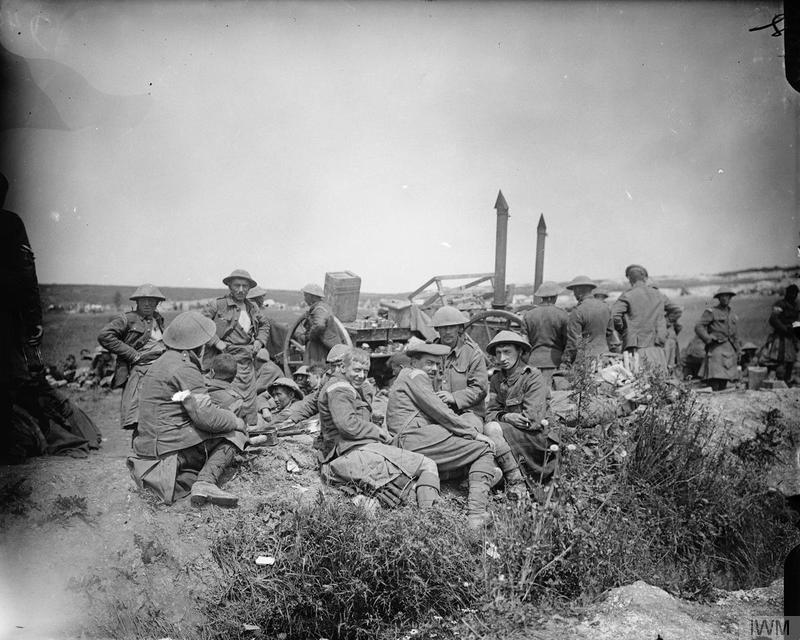
Battle of Bazentin Ridge. Men of the 8th (Service) Battalion, Black Watch back at rest after delivering a counter-attack at Longueval on the morning of 19th July 1916. Carnoy Valley.

The 26th Brigade was formed in 1914 as part of Kitchener's Army of volunteers. It served on the Western Front throughout the war as part of the 9th (Scottish) Division, before being disbanded in 1919.

=== Component units ===
- 8th Battalion, The Black Watch (Royal Highlanders)
- 7th Battalion, Seaforth Highlanders (Ross-shire Buffs, The Duke of Albany's)
- 8th Battalion, the Gordon Highlanders
- 5th Battalion, The Queen's Own Cameron Highlanders
- 10th Battalion, Princess Louise's (Argyll & Sutherland Highlanders)
- 1/5th Territorial Force (T.F.) Loyal North Lancashire Regiment
- 26th Machine Gun Company
- 26th Trench Mortar Battery

=== Commanders ===
The following officers commanded the 26th Infantry Brigade during the First World War:

- Brigadier-General H. R. Kelham (21 September 1914)
- Brigadier-General E. G. Grogan (16 November 1914)
- Brigadier-General A. B. Ritchie (31 May 1915)
- Brigadier-General J. Kennedy (5 December 1916)
- Brigadier-General Hon. A. G. A. Hore-Ruthven (27 July 1918)
- Brigadier-General H. G. Hyslop (5 November 1918)

- Acting: Lieutenant-Colonel R. Campbell (12 November 1918)

- Brigadier-General Hon. A. G. A. Hore-Ruthven (22 November 1918)

== Second World War ==
The brigade was initially formed as an organic part of the 9th (Highland) Infantry Division, itself a duplicate of the 51st (Highland) Infantry Division. When the latter was surrounded and forced to surrender during the Battle of France, the 9th (Highland) Infantry Division was renamed as the 51st (Highland) Infantry Division. As part of these changes the 26th Infantry Brigade was redesignated as the 152nd Infantry Brigade on 7 August 1940.

On 6 April 1945, the 26th Indian Infantry Brigade was reformed as the 26th British Infantry Brigade, part of the 36th Infantry Division which was fighting in the Burma Campaign. This second brigade fought its way to Rangoon. After the reformation of the Territorial Army in 1947 it was active as an independent infantry brigade within Scottish Command for a period.

=== Component units ===
==== In 1939 ====
- 5th Battalion, Queen's Own Cameron Highlanders
- 5th Battalion, Seaforth Highlanders
- 7th Battalion, Seaforth Highlanders

==== In 1945 ====
- 2nd Battalion, Buffs (Royal East Kent Regiment)
- 1st Battalion, Devonshire Regiment
- 1st Battalion, Northamptonshire Regiment

=== Commanders ===
- Brig. I.K. Thomas (CO Original 26th Brigade)
- Brigadier M.B. Jennings
- Brigadier L. Gwydyr-Jones
