= Director of the Royal Artillery =

The Director of the Royal Artillery is the professional head of the Royal Regiment of Artillery the artillery arm of the British Army. The title and the responsibility of the Director of the Royal Artillery have varied over time and at times the title has been abandoned. (Note: Other names of the position have been Director General of the Royal Artillery and Director of Artillery)

== History ==
A post of Director General existed for most of the first half of the 19th century.

A post of Director of Artillery existed over most of the second half of the 19th century and the first half of the 20th. The rank and duties of the Director varied over the decades according to how broadly the term "artillery" was defined by the War Office.

In 1855 a Fortification Branch was established in the War Office. In 1877, an Armaments Division had been established under a Director of Artillery within the Commander-in-Chief's Military Department, but by 1879 there was an Inspector-General of Artillery in the Military Department, and the Armaments Department had become the Ordnance Department including, as one of its senior posts, the Director of Artillery and Stores.

In 1887 Fortification Branch became a division of the Commander-in-Chief's Military Department, having within it both an Inspector-General of Fortifications (a lieutenant-general), and a Director of Artillery (a major-general). In 1895, in the reorganisation of that year, the Branch became an independent department within the War Office, and the post of Director of Artillery lapsed.

In 1904 the Ordnance Department and the Fortifications and Works Department were brought together within the Master-General of the Ordnance's organisation, with Directors of Artillery and Fortifications and Works supporting the Master-General of the Ordnance. The post of Inspector-General of Fortifications was abolished.

In June 1915 the Directorate of Artillery's responsibility for munitions supply, contracts and inspection, and for the Royal Ordnance Factories passed to the Ministry of Munitions, and that for munitions design, pattern and testing followed in March 1916. From October 1917, the Master-General of the Ordnance was an additional member of the Munitions Council. After the war the various functions which had been transferred to the Ministry of Munitions returned gradually.

In October 1924, owing to the increasing range of duties of the Artillery Directorate it was found necessary to sub-divide the existing directorate into two, and a second post of Director of Artillery was created with direct responsibility to the Master-General of the Ordnance.

On 1 October 1927, the distribution of duties between the Quartermaster-General to the Forces and the Master-General of the Ordnance was modified. Thereafter the Master-General of the Ordnance became responsible for all duties relating to military stores (other than building, railway and transport, medical and veterinary stores), while the Quartermaster-General took over from the Master-General of the Ordnance responsibility for all duties in connection with building works. The Directorate of Fortifications and Works became the Directorate of Works, and the second Directorate of Artillery became the Directorate of Mechanization. In October 1935 the Directorate of Works was again styled Directorate of Fortifications and Works.

The post of Director of Artillery continued under the Master-General of the Ordnance until 1938, thence in the Directorate of Munitions Production until 1940 when that Directorate was absorbed by the Ministry of Supply, and the post of Director of Artillery again lapsed.

In 1942 the post of the (by then) Director of Royal Artillery was revived within the War Office, in the department of the Assistant-Chief of the Imperial General Staff. He had responsibility for organisation and weapon policy, co-ordination of progress and development, weapons and controlled equipment at home and overseas, and ammunition at home and overseas. This continued as a general staff post into the post-war period, and thereafter in the unified Ministry of Defence after 1964.

== List of directors of the Royal Artillery ==
- 1827 Lieutenant-General Sir John Macleod
- 1833 Lieutenant-General William Millar
- 1838 Major-General Sir Alexander Dickson
- 1839 Major-General Percy Drummond
- 1843 Major-General Sir Thomas Downman
- 1887–1903, lapsed
- 1927, Edward Willis
- 1938-1940, Edward Montagu Campbell Clarke
- 1940–1941 lapsed
- 1994-1996, Major General Ian Durie
