= Hew Dalrymple Ross =

British Army officer

Field Marshal Sir Hew Dalrymple Ross GCB
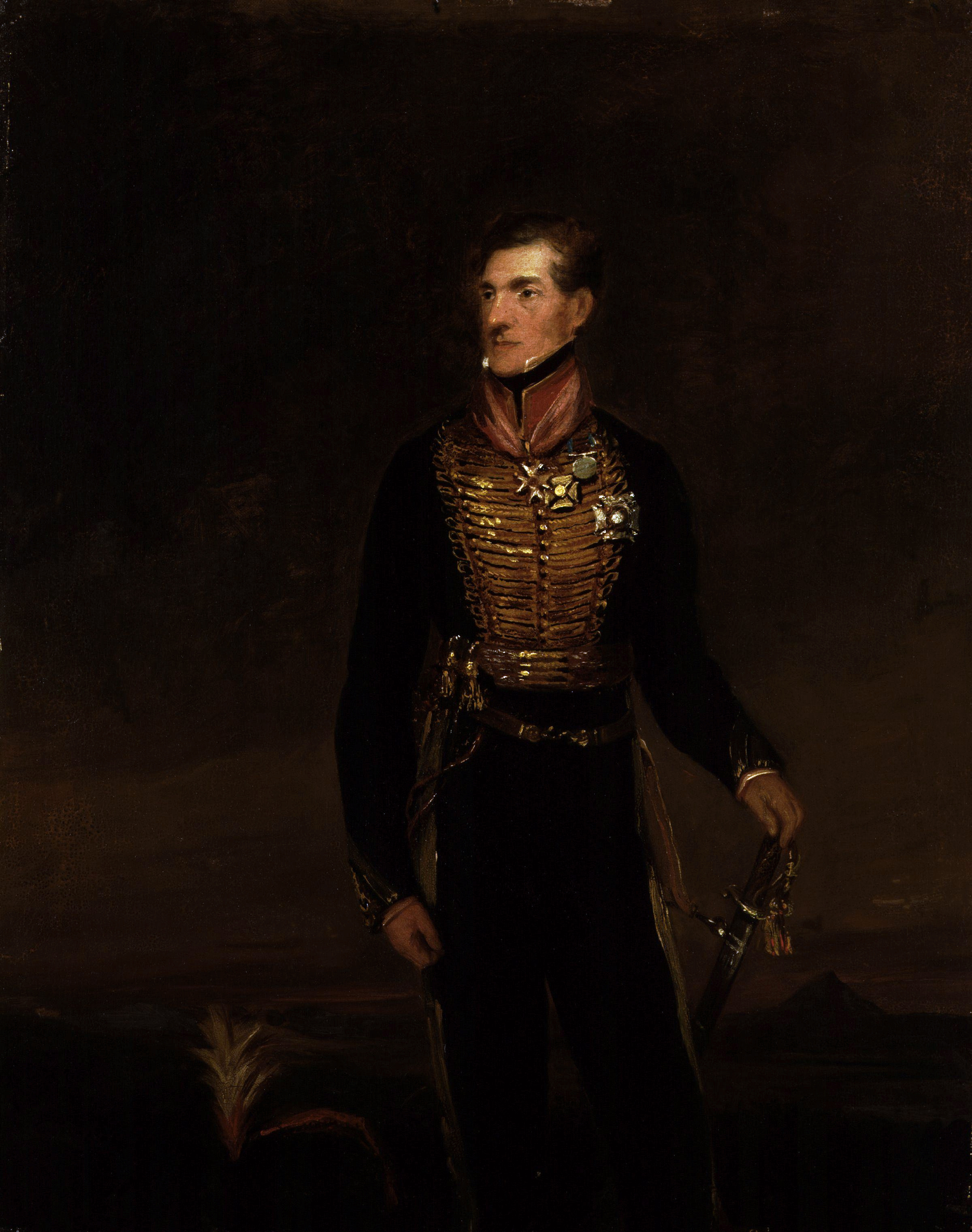
- Portrait by William Salter (oil on canvas, 1834–1840)
- Born: 5 July 1779; Balkail, Kirkcudbrightshire
- Died: 10 December 1868 (aged 89); Knightsbridge, London
- Military career
- Allegiance: United Kingdom
- Branch: British Army
- Service years: 1795–1858
- Rank: Field Marshal
- Commands: The Chestnut Troop
- Conflicts: Irish Rebellion of 1798; Peninsular War; Crimean War
- Awards: Knight Grand Cross of the Order of the Bath

Field Marshal Sir Hew Dalrymple Ross, GCB (5 July 1779 – 10 December 1868) was a British Army officer. After seeing active service during the Irish Rebellion of 1798, he fought as a troop commander in many of the battles of the Peninsular War and the Hundred Days. He went on to become the Artillery Commander, Northern District with delegated command over all the forces of the four northern counties before being promoted to Deputy Adjutant-General, Royal Artillery. Ross was the last person to hold the title of Lieutenant-General of the Ordnance, assuming responsibility for the artillery component sent to take part in the Crimean War under Lord Raglan. After the war he served as Master Gunner, St James's Park, a senior ceremonial post in the Royal Artillery.

== Military career ==
Born the son of Major John Ross and Jane Ross (née Buchan), Ross was educated at the Royal Military Academy, Woolwich and commissioned as a second lieutenant in the Royal Artillery on 6 March 1795. Promoted to lieutenant on 10 May 1796, he saw active service during the Irish Rebellion of 1798 and, following promotion to captain lieutenant on 1 September 1803, was elevated to the role of adjutant on 15 September 1803. He was further promoted to second captain on 26 July 1804 on appointment as adjutant of the 4th Battalion, Royal Artillery at Woolwich Barracks. Promoted to captain on 24 July 1806, he was given command of a troop of the Royal Horse Artillery, which later became famous as the Chestnut Troop.

In 1809, during the Peninsular War, the troop landed at Lisbon and joined Sir Arthur Wellesley's army. Ross's guns were attached to the Light Division and, with Robert Craufurd, took part in several actions during the Battle of the Côa in July 1810 and the Battle of Bussaco in September 1810. When André Masséna began his retreat from the Lines of Torres Vedras, Ross's troop joined the pursuit, seeing action at the Battle of Pombal, the Battle of Redinha and the Battle of Casal Novo in March 1811 as well as at the Battle of Sabugal in April 1811 and the Battle of Fuentes de Oñoro in May 1811. He was rewarded with promotion to major on 31 December 1811.

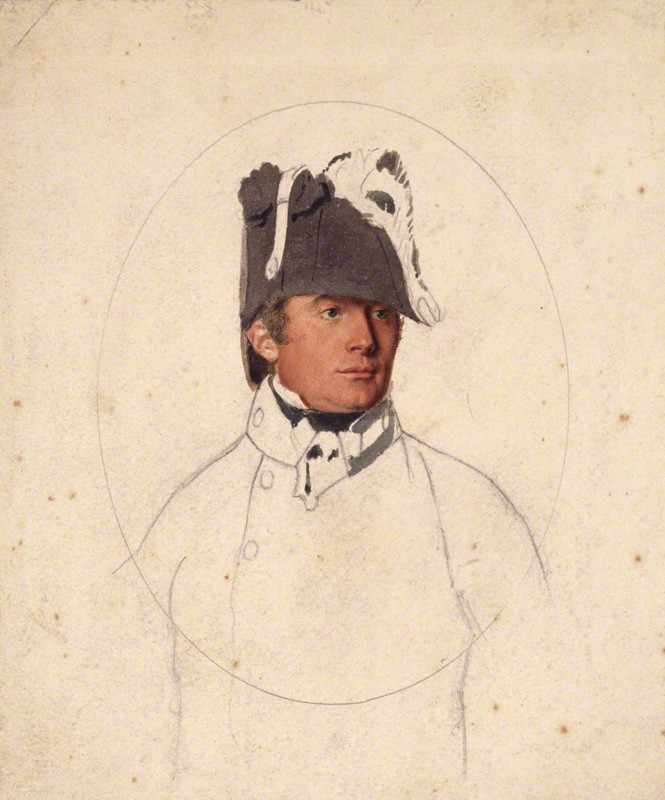
Portrait of Ross by Thomas Heaphy circa 1813

Ross was present at the Siege of Ciudad Rodrigo in January 1812, the Siege of Badajoz in April 1812 and at the Battle of Salamanca in July 1812. After the Battle of Vitoria in June 1813, Ross's guns were continually with the most advanced troops, and they captured the sole remaining piece of artillery held by the French troops. He was rewarded with promotion to lieutenant colonel on 3 July 1813. In July 1813, Ross also took part in the Battle of the Pyrenees, which was followed by actions at Bidassoa in October 1813 and Nivelle in November 1813. During the Battle of the Nive in December 1813, Ross had his horse shot out from under him, but he was unharmed and in April 1814 he fought at the Battle of Bayonne. Following these military successes, he was appointed a Knight Commander of the Order of the Bath on 4 January 1815. During the Hundred Days, Ross was engaged at the Battle of Waterloo in June 1815, and although half his guns were disabled, the remainder took part in the pursuit of the French. He was awarded the Russian Order of St. Anna, 2nd Class on 8 October 1815.

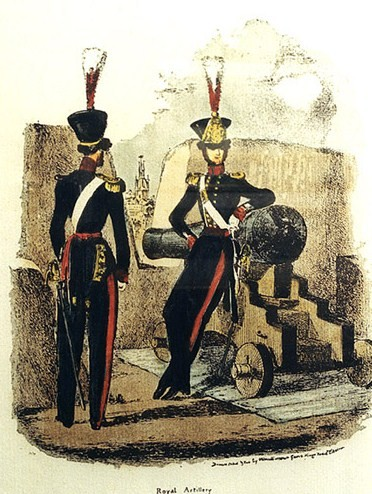
Two gunners and their artillery piece depicted in 1825 at which time Ross was serving as Artillery Commander, Northern District

Ross became the Artillery Commander, Northern District in 1825 with delegated command over all the forces of the four most northern counties in England. Promoted to colonel on 22 July 1830, he became Deputy Adjutant-General, Royal Artillery on 23 April 1840, receiving promotion to major-general on 23 November 1841 and to lieutenant general on 11 November 1851. He became Lieutenant-General of the Ordnance on 2 May 1854 and in that capacity was responsible for checking the artillery component sent to take part in the Crimean War under Lord Raglan personally ensuring that every battery was despatched from the United Kingdom to the front in a high state of efficiency. He also founded the facility that was to become the Royal Artillery Experimental Unit at Shoeburyness. He was promoted to full general on 28 November 1854 and, following the abolition of the Board of Ordnance, became Adjutant-General, Royal Artillery on 22 May 1855. He was advanced to Knight Grand Cross of the Order of the Bath on 5 July 1855 and also served as colonel commandant of the Royal Horse Artillery.

Ross retired in April 1858; he became Master Gunner, St James's Park in 1864 and, having been promoted to field marshal on 1 January 1868, he became lieutenant-governor of the Royal Hospital Chelsea on 3 August 1868. He died a few months later at his home in Knightsbridge in London on 10 December 1868.

== Family ==
In 1816 Ross married Elizabeth Graham; they had two sons, Major Hew Graham Ross (1817-1848) and General Sir John Ross.

== Sources ==
- Duncan, Francis (2008). History of the Royal Regiment of Artillery. BiblioLife. ISBN 978-0559351686.
- Heathcote, Tony (1999). The British Field Marshals, 1736–1997: A Biographical Dictionary. Barnsley: Leo Cooper. ISBN 0-85052-696-5.
- Ross, Hew Dalrymple (1871). Memoir of Field-Marshal Sir Hew Dalrymple Ross: Royal Horse Artillery. Kessinger Publishing. ISBN 978-1166943721.

Military offices
Preceded by Vacant	Lieutenant-General of the Ordnance; 1854–1855	Succeeded by Office abolished
Honorary titles
Preceded by Robert Gardiner	Master Gunner, St James's Park; 1864–1868	Succeeded by William Wylde
