= Collingwood Dickson =

British military officer, VC recipient (1817–1904)

General Sir Collingwood Dickson VC GCB
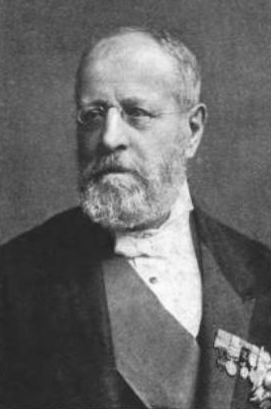
- Born: 20 November 1817; Valenciennes, France
- Died: 28 November 1904 (aged 87); London, England
- Burial place: Kensal Green Cemetery, London
- Relatives: Major General Sir Alexander Dickson (father)
- Military career
- Allegiance: United Kingdom
- Branch: British Army
- Service years: 1835–1877
- Rank: General
- Units: Royal Artillery
- Conflicts: First Carlist War; Crimean War
- Awards: Victoria Cross; Knight Grand Cross of the Order of the Bath; Knight's Cross of the Order of Charles III (Spain); Royal and Military Order of San Fernando (Spain); Knight's Cross of the Order of Isabella the Catholic (Spain); Legion of Honour (France); Order of the Medjidie (Ottoman Empire)

General Sir Collingwood Dickson, VC, GCB (20 November 1817 – 28 November 1904) was a senior British Army officer and a recipient of the Victoria Cross, the highest award for gallantry in the face of the enemy that can be awarded to British and Commonwealth forces.

== Early life and career ==
Collingwood Dickson was a son of Major General Sir Alexander Dickson, a Royal Artillery officer. He was educated at the Royal Military Academy, Woolwich, and followed his father into the Royal Artillery in 1835. He served in the First Carlist War, in which the United Kingdom supported Queen Isabella II. After that war, Queen Isabella awarded him three Spanish decorations: the Order of Charles III, the Royal and Military Order of San Fernando and the Order of Isabella the Catholic.

== Victoria Cross action ==
At the siege of Sebastopol during the Crimean War, Dickson was a lieutenant colonel on the staff of Lord Raglan. Following an incident during the siege, Dickson was awarded the VC:

For having, on the 17th October, 1854, when the batteries of the Right Attack had run short of powder, displayed the greatest coolness and contempt of danger, in directing the unloading of several wagons of the Field-Battery, which were brought up to the trenches to supply the want; and having personally assisted in carrying the powder barrels under a severe fire from the enemy.

Dickson was appointed a Companion of the Order of the Bath in 1855, and in 1856, along with many other British soldiers, he was appointed Chevalier of the French Legion of Honour; shortly before the publication of his VC award in 1857 he was promoted to the next higher rank of the Legion, Officier.

== Later life ==
From September 1855 till the end of the Crimean War Dickson was employed with the Turkish contingent, and the Sultan awarded him the Order of the Medjidie (third class).

Later in his army service Dickson was Inspector-General of Artillery 1870–75. He was made Colonel commandant of the Royal Artillery in 1875, and was promoted to full general in 1877. He officially retired in 1884, but remained Colonel Commandant until his death in 1904. His Victoria Cross and his many other medals are on display at the Royal Artillery Museum.

Honorary titles
Preceded by Sir John St George	Master Gunner, St James's Park; 1891–1904	Succeeded by Earl Roberts
