= Robert Biddulph (British Army officer) =

General Sir Robert Biddulph GCB GCMG
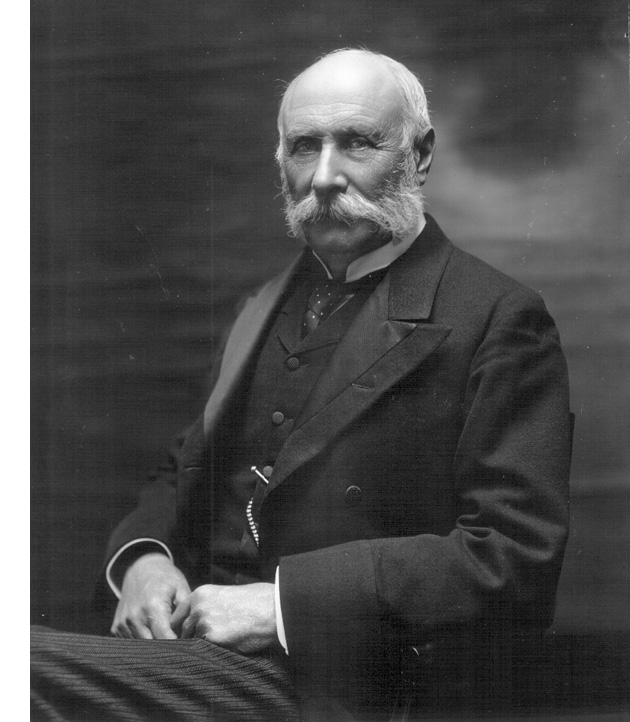
- General Sir Robert Biddulph, photographed 12 June 1906
- Born: 26 August 1835; London, England
- Died: 18 November 1918 (aged 83); Cornwall Gardens, Kensington, England
- Burial place: Charlton cemetery, London
- Military career
- Allegiance: United Kingdom
- Branch: British Army
- Service years: 1850–1904
- Rank: General
- Commands: Gibraltar; Cyprus
- Conflicts: Crimean War; Indian Mutiny; Second Opium War
- Awards: Knight Grand Cross of the Order of the Bath; Knight Grand Cross of the Order of St Michael and St George

General Sir Robert Biddulph, GCB, GCMG (26 August 1835 – 18 November 1918) was a senior British Army officer. He served as Quartermaster-General to the Forces in 1893, and was then Governor of Gibraltar until 1900.

== Military career ==
Educated at Twyford School and the Royal Military Academy, Woolwich, Biddulph was commissioned into the Royal Artillery in 1853. He served in the Crimean War and was present at the Siege of Sevastopol in 1854. He then served in the Indian Mutiny, and was Brigade Major during the Siege of Lucknow in 1857.

In 1871 he was selected to be Assistant Adjutant-General at the War Office and then in 1879 he succeeded Sir Garnet Wolseley as High Commissioner and Commander-in-Chief of Cyprus. In 1886, he returned to London to be Inspector-General of Recruiting and two years later became Director-General of Military Education. In 1893 he was briefly Quartermaster-General to the Forces. Later that year, he became Governor of Gibraltar, serving as such until 1900. He was Colonel Commandant of the Royal Artillery, and was placed on retired pay on 26 August 1902.

His final appointment, in 1904, was as Army Purchase Commissioner: in that capacity he abolished the purchase of commissions.

He was appointed Knight Grand Cross of the Order of the Bath in the 1899 Birthday Honours. Biddulph's Gate in Famagusta in Cyprus is named after him.

== Family ==
Biddulph was the son of Robert Biddulph, MP. In 1864 he married Sophia Lambert and together they went on to have four sons and six daughters.

Military offices
Preceded by Sir Thomas Baker	Quartermaster-General to the Forces; 1893	Succeeded by Sir Evelyn Wood
Government offices
Preceded by Sir Lothian Nicholson	Governor of Gibraltar; 1893–1900	Succeeded by Sir George Stuart White
Honorary titles
Preceded by Lord Roberts	Master Gunner, St James's Park; 1914–1918	Succeeded by Francis Ward
