= 12th (Eastern) Division =

Infantry division of the British Army during World War I

- Insignia of the 12th (Eastern) Division
- Active: 1914–1919
- Country: United Kingdom
- Branch: British Army
- Type: Infantry
- Size: Division
- Engagements: First World War

The 12th (Eastern) Division was an infantry division raised by the British Army during the First World War from men volunteering for Kitchener's New Armies. The division saw service in the trenches of the Western Front from June 1915 to the end of the war.

== Formation and First World War ==
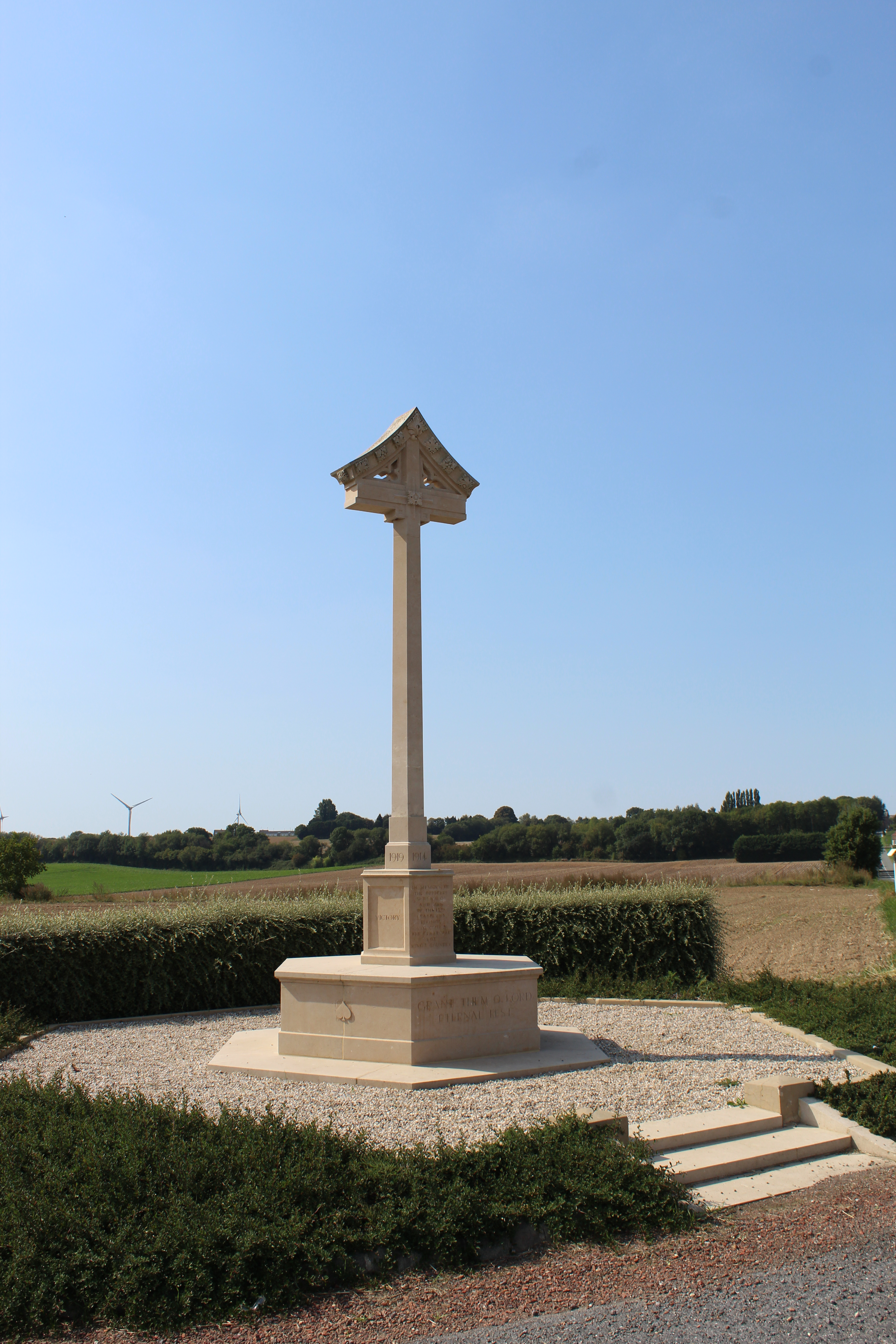
The memorial to the glory of the 12th British Infantry Division to Epehy.

The 12th (Eastern) Division, was one of the first Kitchener's Army divisions raised from volunteers by Lord Kitchener. It was formed within Eastern Command as a result of Army Order No. 324 of 21 August 1914, as part of the K1 wave of divisions.

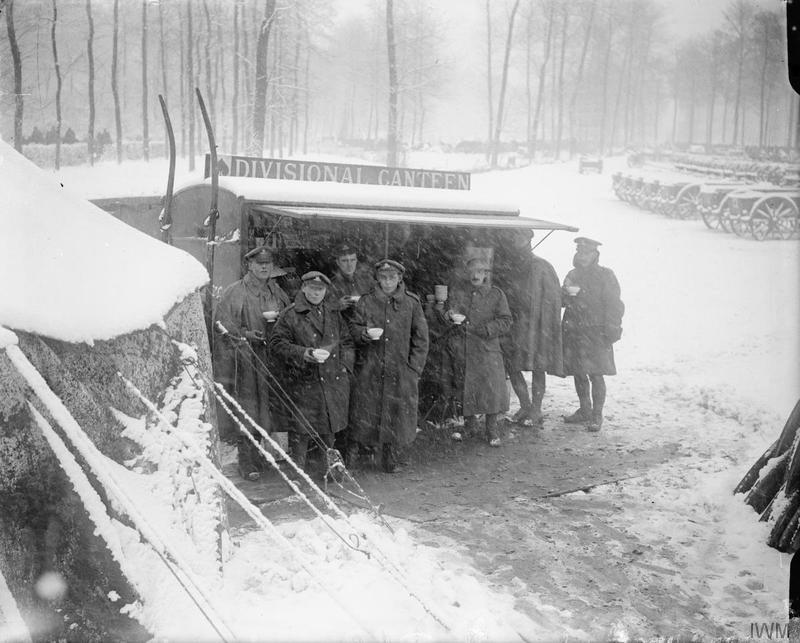
Royal Artillery gunners at the 12th Divisional Canteen on the Arras road near St. Pol, February 1917.

It fought on the Western Front for the duration of the First World War. One of its most notable actions was the Battle of Épehy where there is a memorial cross to the 12th Division.

In the First World War, the division's insignia was the Ace of Spades, which has since been adopted by the present 12th Armoured Infantry Brigade.

=== Order of Battle ===
35th Brigade

- 7th (Service) Battalion, Norfolk Regiment
- 7th (Service) Battalion, Suffolk Regiment (left May 1918)
- 9th (Service) Battalion, Essex Regiment
- 5th (Service) Battalion, Princess Charlotte of Wales's (Royal Berkshire Regiment) (transferred to 36th Brigade February 1918)
- 1/1st Territorial Force (T.F.) Battalion, Cambridgeshire Regiment (joined May 1918)
- 35th Machine Gun Company, Machine Gun Corps (formed 1 February 1916, moved to 12th Battalion, Machine Gun Corps (M.G.C.) 1 March 1918)
- 35th Trench Mortar Battery (formed 25 June 1916)

36th Brigade

- 8th (Service) Battalion, Royal Fusiliers (City of London Regiment) (disbanded February 1918)
- 9th (Service) Battalion, Royal Fusiliers (City of London Regiment)
- 7th (Service) Battalion, Royal Sussex Regiment
- 11th (Service) Battalion, Duke of Cambridge's Own (Middlesex Regiment) (disbanded February 1918)
- 5th (Service) Battalion, Princess Charlotte of Wales's (Royal Berkshire Regiment) (transferred from 35th Brigade February 1918)
- 36th Machine Gun Company, Machine Gun Corps (formed 1 February 1916, moved to 12th Battalion, M.G.C. 1 March 1918)
- 36th Trench Mortar Battery (formed 15 June 1916)

37th Brigade

- 6th (Service) Battalion, Queen's (Royal West Surrey Regiment)
- 6th (Service) Battalion, Buffs (East Kent Regiment)
- 7th (Service) Battalion, East Surrey Regiment (disbanded February 1918)
- 6th (Service) Battalion, Queen's Own (Royal West Kent Regiment)
- 37th Machine Gun Company, Machine Gun Corps (formed 4 February 1916, moved to 12th Battalion, M.G.C. 1 March 1918)
- 37th Trench Mortar Battery (formed 15 June 1916)

Divisional Troops

- 5th (Service) Battalion, Northamptonshire Regiment (division pioneers)
- 9 Motor Machine Gun Battery (joined early 1915, left 20 June 1915)
- 235th Machine Gun Company (joined 16 July 1917, left to move into 12th Battalion M.G. C. 1 March 1918)
- 12th Battalion Machine Gun Corps (formed 1 March 1918, absorbing the brigade MG companies)
- Divisional Mounted Troops
  - A Squadron, King Edward's Horse (joined April 1915, left June 1916)
  - 12th Divisional Cyclist Company, Army Cyclist Corps (left 15 June 1916)
- 12th Divisional Train Army Service Corps
  - 116th, 117th, 118th and 119th Companies
- 23rd Mobile Veterinary Section Army Veterinary Corps
- 214th Divisional Employment Company (joined 16 June 1917)

Royal Artillery

- LXII Brigade, Royal Field Artillery (R.F.A.)
- LXIII Brigade, R.F.A.
- LXIV Brigade, R.F.A. (left 6 January 1917)
- LXV (Howitzer) Brigade, R.F.A. (broken up 30 August 1916)
- 12th Divisional Ammunition Column R.F.A.
- 12th Heavy Battery, Royal Garrison Artillery (left 8 June 1915)
- V.12 Heavy Trench Mortar Battery R.F.A. (joined 31 July 1916, disbanded 12 February 1918)
- X.12, Y.12 and Z.12 Medium Mortar Batteries R.F.A. (formed 1 July 1916; on 16 February 1918, Z broken up distributed among X and Y batteries)

Royal Engineers

- 69th Field Company
- 70th Field Company
- 87th Field Company (joined January 1915)
- 12th Divisional Signals Company

Royal Army Medical Corps

- 36th Field Ambulance
- 37th Field Ambulance
- 38th Field Ambulance
- 23rd Sanitary Section (left 1 April 1917)

== General Officer Commanding ==
- Major-General James Spens 24 August 1914 – 15 March 1915
- Major-General Frederick D.V. Wing 15 March – 2 October 1915
- Brigadier-General W. K. McLeod 2–3 October 1915 (acting)
- Major-General Arthur B. Scott 3 October 1915 – 26 April 1918
- Major-General H. W. Higginson 26 April 1918 –

== See also ==
- List of British divisions in World War I

== Bibliography ==
- Middleton Brumwell, P. (2001) [1923]. Scott, A. B. (ed.). History of the 12th (Eastern) Division in the Great War, 1914–1918 (Naval & Military Press ed.). London: Nisbet. ISBN 1-84342-228-X. OCLC 6069610.
- Ian F.W. Beckett, 'Territorials: A Century of Service,' First Published April 2008 by DRA Printing of 14 Mary Seacole Road, The Millfields, Plymouth PL1 3JY on behalf of TA 100, ISBN 978-0-9557813-1-5.
- Cliff Lord & Graham Watson, Royal Corps of Signals: Unit Histories of the Corps (1920–2001) and its Antecedents, Solihull: Helion, 2003, ISBN 1-874622-92-2.
- Col L.F. Morling, Sussex Sappers: A History of the Sussex Volunteer and Territorial Army Royal Engineer Units from 1890 to 1967, Seaford: 208th Field Co, RE/Christians–W.J. Offord, 1972.
- Graham E. Watson & Richard A. Rinaldi, The Corps of Royal Engineers: Organization and Units 1889–2018, Tiger Lily Books, 2018, ISBN 978-171790180-4.
