= Granville Egerton =

British Army general (1859–1951)

Major-General Granville Egerton CB
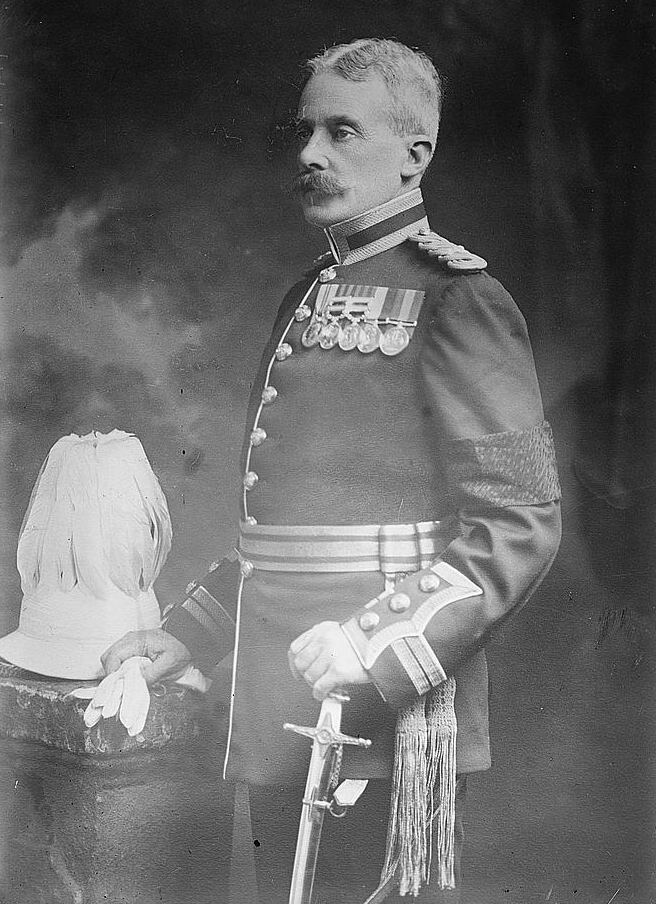
- Egerton in 1915
- Born: 10 May 1859; Mayfair, London, England
- Died: 3 May 1951 (aged 91); Edinburgh, Scotland
- Relatives: Francis Egerton, 1st Earl of Ellesmere (grandfather)
- Military career
- Allegiance: United Kingdom
- Branch: British Army
- Service years: 1879–1919
- Rank: Major-General
- Units: 72nd Regiment of Foot; Seaforth Highlanders
- Commands: Small Arms School; 52nd (Lowland) Division
- Conflicts: Second Afghan War: Battle of Kandahar; Anglo-Egyptian War; Nile Expedition; First World War: Gallipoli campaign
- Awards: Companion of the Order of the Bath

Major-General Granville George Algernon Egerton, CB (10 May 1859 – 3 May 1951) was a British Army officer who commanded the 52nd (Lowland) Division from March 1914 to September 1915, during the First World War. His wartime service included commanding the 52nd Division during the Gallipoli campaign throughout most of 1915.

== Early life ==
Egerton was born at 35 Hertford Street in Mayfair, London, to Colonel the Hon. Arthur Frederick Egerton of the Grenadier Guards and his wife Helen (née Smith), daughter of Martin Tucker Smith of the Smith banking family. His grandfather was the 1st Earl of Ellesmere.

Attending Charterhouse School, he was a member of the house Saunderites between 1872 and 1879. After completing his studies at the Royal Military College, Sandhurst, he was commissioned as a second lieutenant. The commission was dated 13 August 1879.

== Early military career ==
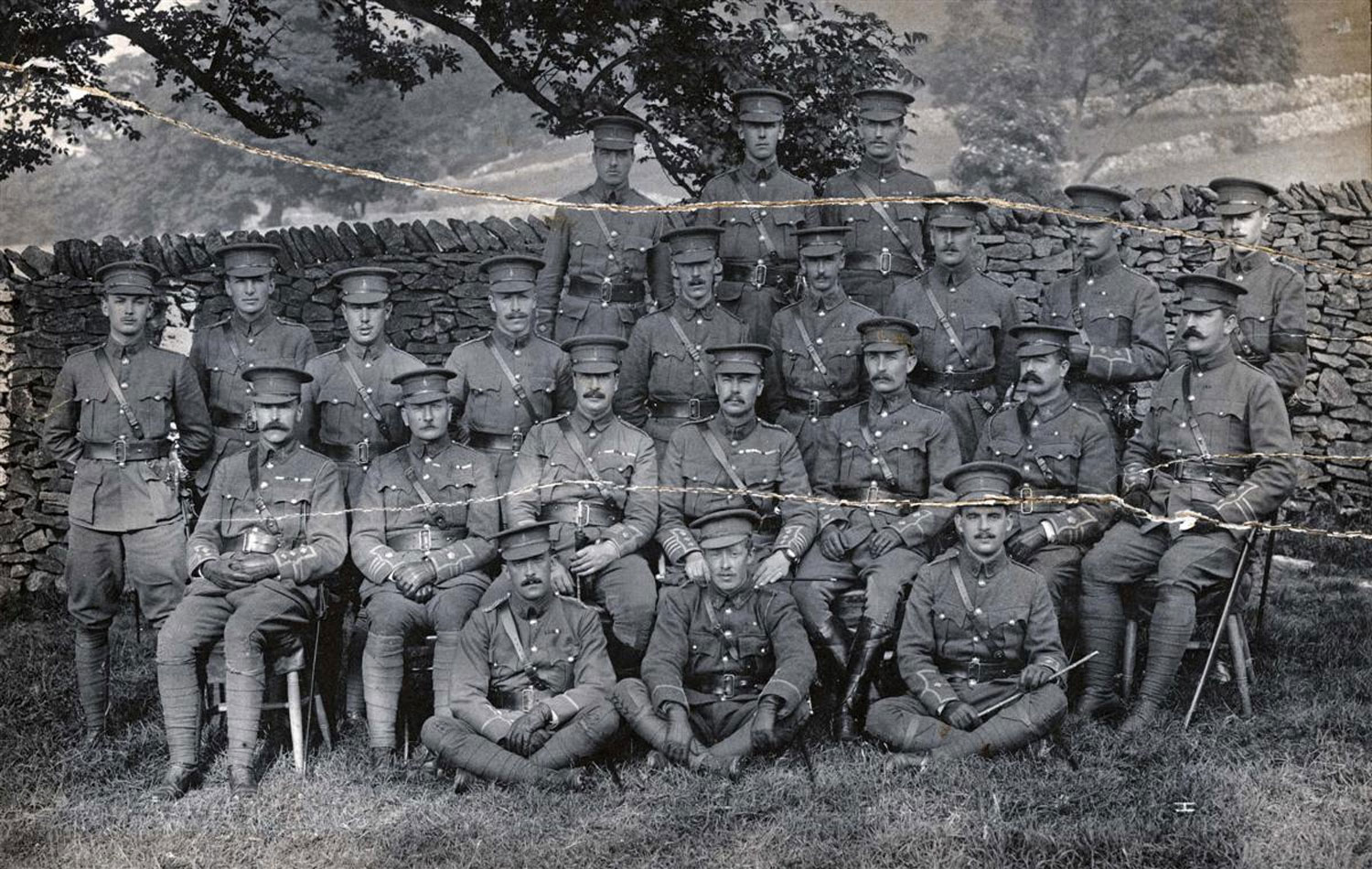
Officers of the 1st Battalion, Yorkshire Regiment, at a training camp in Castleton, Derbyshire, July 1904. Seated in the centre of the second row is Lieutenant Colonel Granville Egerton, the battalion's CO.

Serving with the 72nd Regiment of Foot, Egerton participated in the march from Kabul to Kandahar during the Second Afghan War. The British force defeated an Afghan army under Ayub Khan at the Battle of Kandahar, a battle in which Edgerton received severe wounds. For his service in Afghanistan he was mentioned in dispatches. Of the Kabul to Kandahar march Egerton wrote in 1930,

Afghanistan is a country of high altitudes with extremities of temperature. Shivering at 45deg. Fahrenheit in a thin khaki coat at the start of the day's march, one knew well that before one reached camp the thermometer would have risen to 105deg. We were on the whole well fed on plain soldiers' rations-meat and chupattees; officers and men shared alike.

He was promoted to lieutenant in June 1881. His service continued with the Anglo-Egyptian War of 1882 and the Nile Expedition to Sudan in 1898, where he was mentioned in dispatches twice more. He is recorded in 1893 as being in service as a captain, having been promoted to that rank in May 1889, in the Seaforth Highlanders and was Scottish District Inspector of Musketry. In this capacity Edgerton, who in June 1898 was promoted to major, was responsible for the training of regular, militia and volunteer soldiers in Scotland. When an army camp was established at Barry in Angus the rifle ranges were constructed "in accordance with his ideas and under his supervision".

He transferred from the Seaforths to the Green Howards as a lieutenant colonel in May 1903 and commanded the regiment's 1st Battalion. He was promoted on 12 February 1904 to brevet colonel and to colonel in March 1907 and became commandant of the Small Arms School at Hythe, Kent, taking over from Colonel Charles Monro, a Sandhurst classmate. After relinquishing this assignment, Egerton was then promoted to the temporary rank of brigadier general in September 1909 and became general officer commanding (GOC) of the 1st Malta Infantry Brigade.

He was promoted to major general in December 1912. He then succeeded Major General J. Spens as GOC of the Lowland Division, a Territorial Force (TF) formation based in Scotland, in March 1914, just a few months prior to the outbreak of the First World War.

== First World War ==
He led his division in the Gallipoli campaign where it took part in the landing at Cape Helles in June 1915, eight months after the British entry into World War I, and Egerton received a further two mentions in dispatches during the war.

His experience at Gallipoli would not turn out to be a happy one. His division, which in 1915 was redesignated the 52nd (Lowland) Division, "totally unclimatised and many still wearing their winter serge uniforms", and not even fully up to strength, was nevertheless "pitched piecemeal into a series of costly attacks". Despite protesting the handling of his command by Major General Beauvoir de Lisle, GOC of the nearby 29th Division (which had one of Egerton's brigades under its command only to suffer heavy casualties), to General Sir Ian Hamilton, commander of the Mediterranean Expeditionary Force (MEF), he was instead "reprimanded".

On 30 August Egerton noted,

Oh my God, what a life this is! I shall want a six months' rest cure if I survive it, and please God no more soldiering for me again. A garden and the cultivation of flowers is what I look forward to.

Egerton, removed by Hamilton and replaced in command of the 52nd by Major General Herbert Lawrence, went on to be a base commandant on 22 September and was director of infantry at the War Office in London on 16 April 1916, taking over the role from Major General Vesey John Dawson. He relinquished this position on 3 August 1918.

== Postwar years ==
He then retired with the rank of major general in 1919.

In August 1921 he succeeded Lieutenant General Sir David Henderson as colonel of the Highland Light Infantry.

== Later life ==
After the war he was colonel of the Highland Light Infantry between August 1921 and 1929. In a letter to The Times in 1927 he wrote of his service in the early days of the First World War,

As and old Regular officer, and commander of a Territorial Division in the field, I shall always hold that the men who were Territorial soldiers on August 4, 1914, were, of all those who battled during the four years of conflict, the real true salt of the earth. Few of them remain, and very meagre were the thanks they got.

— Granville Egerton, The Times

He died at 7 Inverleith Place, Edinburgh, on 3 May 1951 with his funeral taking place at Warriston Crematorium.

== Bibliography ==
- Raw, David (2020). Gallipoli, the Egerton Diaries and Papers: The Diaries and Papers of Major-General Granville Egerton CB Commanding 52nd Lowland Division at Gallipoli, June–September, 1915. Helion Limited. ISBN 978-1912390847.

Military offices
Preceded by James Spens	GOC 52nd (Lowland) Infantry Division; 1914–1915	Succeeded by Herbert Lawrence
Honorary titles
Preceded by Sir David Henderson	Colonel of the Highland Light Infantry; 1921–1929	Succeeded by Lord Horne
