= Master Gunner, St James's Park =

Senior officer in the Royal Artillery

Master Gunner, St James' Park
- The Royal Artillery Standard, used as a car flag in miniature by the master gunner, St James' Park

- Incumbent; Mike Elviss since 1 November 2025
- British Army
- Formation: 1678
- First holder: Thomas Silver

The appointment of Master Gunner, St James's Park, goes back to 1678 and has generally been held by a senior officer in the Royal Artillery. The early incumbents (known then as the Master Gunner of Whitehall and St James's Park) were responsible for the artillery defence of the Palace of Whitehall and the Palace of Westminster.

There has always been a connection between the monarch and the regiment. The Master Gunner, whose appointment is approved by the monarch, is the link to the regiment. He presides over regimental affairs by heading a committee comprising serving and recently retired senior officers of the regiment which provides guidance, advice and direction on all matters and affairs concerning the past, present and future of the Royal Regiment. Along with his fellow Masters and Chiefs, he provides a report annually to the Chief of the General Staff on regimental affairs. The Master Gunner also maintains the links to Commonwealth Royal Artilleries.

The appointment of Master Gunner, St James's Park is not related to the rank of Warrant Officer Class 1 (Master Gunner).

== List of Master Gunners ==
Name	Dates of service
Whitehall and St. James's Park
Captain Thomas Silver	1678–1710
Lieutenant Colonel Jonas Watson	1710–1741
St. James's Park
Lieutenant Colonel James Deal	1742–1760
Major-General Joseph Brome	1760–1769
Held by a non-commissioned officer	1770–1783
Major-General Joseph Walton	1783–1808
Lieutenant General Sir John Macleod	1808–1833
Major General Sir Alexander Dickson	1833–1840
General Sir Robert Gardiner	1840–1864
Field Marshal Sir Hew Dalrymple Ross	1864–1868
General William Wylde	1868–1877
General Sir John Bloomfield	1877–1880
General Poole England	1880–1884
General Sir John St George	1884–1891
General Sir Collingwood Dickson	1891–1904
Field Marshal Frederick Roberts, 1st Earl Roberts	1904–1914
General Sir Robert Biddulph	1914–1918
Major General Francis Ward	1918–1919
General Sir Edward Chapman	1919–1926
General Henry Horne, 1st Baron Horne	1926–1929
Field Marshal George Milne, 1st Baron Milne	1929–1946
Field Marshal Alan Brooke, 1st Viscount Alanbrooke	1946–1956
General Sir Cameron Nicholson	1956–1960
General Sir Robert Mansergh	1960–1970
Field Marshal Sir Geoffrey Baker	1970–1976
General Sir Harry Tuzo	1977–1983
General Sir Thomas Morony	1983–1988
General Sir Martin Farndale	1988–1996
Field Marshal Richard Vincent, Baron Vincent of Coleshill	1996–2000
General Sir Alexander Harley	2001–2008
General Sir Timothy Granville-Chapman	2008–2017
Lieutenant General Sir Andrew Gregory	2017–2025
Lieutenant General Michael Elviss	2025–present
