= John Bloomfield (British Army officer) =

British Army general

General Sir John Bloomfield GCB
- Born: c.1793
- Died: 1 August 1880 (aged 87); London
- Burial place: Brompton Cemetery
- Relatives: Benjamin Bloomfield, 1st Baron Bloomfield (cousin)
- Military career
- Allegiance: United Kingdom
- Branch: British Army
- Service years: 1810–1880
- Rank: General
- Unit: Royal Artillery
- Commands: Master Gunner, St James's Park
- Conflicts: Napoleonic Wars; Peninsular War; Battle of Vitoria; Siege of San Sebastián; Battle of the Bidassoa; Battle of Nivelle; Battle of the Nive; Battle of Orthes; Battle of Toulouse; Hundred Days; Battle of Quatre Bras; Battle of Waterloo
- Awards: Military General Service Medal

General Sir John Bloomfield GCB (c. 1793 – 1 August 1880) was Master Gunner, St James's Park, the most senior ceremonial position in the Royal Artillery after the Sovereign.

== Military career ==
Bloomfield was commissioned into the Royal Artillery in 1810 and rose through the officer ranks to become a lieutenant-general in 1866.

He was made colonel commandant of the Royal Artillery in 1866 and promoted to full general in 1876 and then held the position of Master Gunner, St James's Park from 1877. He died in 1880.

Honorary titles
Preceded by William Wylde	Master Gunner, St James's Park; 1877–1880	Succeeded by Poole England
