= Edward Chapman (British Army officer) =

British Army general

General Sir Edward Chapman KCB EsqStJ FRGS
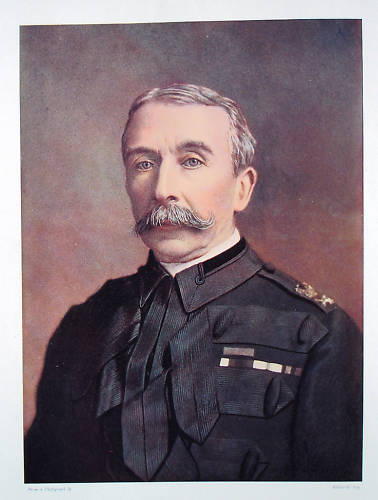
- Sir Edward Chapman
- Born: 14 November 1840; Calcutta, India
- Died: 12 May 1926 (aged 85); Limpsfield, Surrey
- Military career
- Allegiance: United Kingdom
- Branch: British India; United Kingdom
- Service years: 1858–1906
- Rank: General
- Units: Bengal Artillery; Royal Artillery
- Commands: Colonel Commandant Royal Artillery; Scottish District
- Conflicts: British Expedition to Abyssinia; Second Anglo-Afghan War; Third Anglo-Burmese War
- Awards: Knight Commander of the Order of the Bath; Mentioned in Dispatches
- Other work: Geographer

General Sir Edward Francis Chapman KCB EsqStJ FRGS (14 November 1840 – 12 May 1926) was a senior British Army officer who commanded the Army in Scotland and was the ceremonial head of the Royal Regiment of Artillery.

== Military career ==
He was commissioned into the Bengal Artillery in 1858, which was later amalgamated into the Royal Artillery. He quickly caught the attention of Sir Frederick Roberts who predicted that Chapman would "make his mark". He was duly selected to fight in the British Expedition to Abyssinia between 1867 and 1868 as the commander of No. 5 Battery, 21st Brigade. He was present at the action of Arogee and at the fall of Magdala, working as aide-de-camp to Brigadier-General Petrie and being mentioned in dispatches for his services. Chapman was part of a mission to Yarkand in China in 1874. He served in the Second Anglo-Afghan War from 1878 to 1880, and was Sir Frederick Roberts' Chief of Staff during the march from Kabul to Kandahar.

He was appointed Military Secretary to the Commander-in-Chief, India in 1881 and went on the Burma expedition in 1885. He was Quartermaster-General for India from 1885 to 1889, and introduced a system of organised native brothels for British other ranks in the hope of reducing the incidence of venereal diseases. He became the second Director of Military Intelligence at the War Office in 1891. He was aide-de-camp to Queen Victoria in 1891. As an active member of the Royal Geographical Society, he presented several lectures and wrote numerous papers on the effects of physical geography on the tactics and success of military operations. Additionally, he wrote several books about military geography and the history of the British Indian Army. He was promoted to major-general in 1889, lieutenant-general in 1892, and general in March 1896. Chapman was made Commander Scottish District in 1896, a post he held until May 1901. He was made a Knight Commander of the Order of the Bath in 1905 and retired in 1906. He was appointed a Colonel-Commandant of the Royal Regiment of Artillery on 14 January 1903, and was Master Gunner, St James's Park, the ceremonial commander of the Royal Artillery, between 1919 and 1926.

== Personal life ==
On 3 December 1886 he married Georgiana Bayley, daughter of Edward Clive Bayley.

He lived at Limpsfield in Surrey. He was an Esquire of the Venerable Order of Saint John and a member of the Athenaeum Club, London.

The Anglican priest and London County Council member the Rev Hugh Boswell Chapman was a younger brother.

Military offices
| Preceded by Hugh Rowlands | GOC Scottish District; 1896–1901 | Succeeded by Archibald Hunter |
| Preceded by Henry Brackenbury | Director of Military Intelligence; 1891–1896 | Succeeded by John Charles Ardagh |
Honorary titles
| Preceded by Francis Ward | Master Gunner, St James's Park; 1919–1926 | Succeeded by Lord Horne |
