= Poole England =

British Army general

General Poole England
- Born: 1788; New Jersey, United States
- Died: 21 November 1884 (aged 96); Dover, United Kingdom
- Military career
- Allegiance: United Kingdom
- Branch: British Army
- Service years: 1805–1884
- Rank: General
- Unit: Royal Artillery
- Conflicts: Napoleonic Wars; Hanover Expedition; British invasions of the River Plate; Peninsular War; Battle of Vitoria; Siege of San Sebastián
- Awards: Military General Service Medal

General Poole Vallancey England (1788 – 6 November 1884) was Master Gunner, St James's Park, the most senior ceremonial position in the Royal Artillery after the Sovereign.

== Military career ==
England was commissioned into the Royal Artillery in 1805. He served with the British Army Garrison in Malta from 1824 to 1826 and rose through the officer ranks to become a Lieutenant-General in 1866.

He was made Colonel Commandant of the Royal Artillery in 1866. He was promoted to full General in 1873 and retired in 1877, and then held the position of Master Gunner, St James's Park from 1880.

England died at his home at 41 Marine Parade in Dover on 21 November 1884.

== Family ==
He married Mary Lutwyche and together they went on to have a son and two daughters.

Honorary titles
Preceded by Sir John Bloomfield	Master Gunner, St James's Park; 1880–1884	Succeeded by Sir John St. George
