= Joseph Walton (British Army officer) =

Major-General Joseph Walton
- Died: 1808
- Military career
- Allegiance: United Kingdom
- Branch: British Army
- Rank: Major-General
- Conflicts: American Revolutionary War

Major-General Joseph Walton (died 1808) was Master Gunner, St James's Park, the most senior ceremonial position in the Royal Artillery after the Sovereign.

== Military career ==
Walton was commissioned into the Royal Artillery and was sent to North America where he was serving under General Thomas Gage in 1764.

He held the position of Master Gunner, St James's Park from 1783 and of Colonel of the Invalid Battalion from 1793. He was promoted to Major-General in 1802 and died in 1808.

Honorary titles
Preceded by Held by an NCO	Master Gunner, St James's Park; 1783–1808	Succeeded by Sir John Macleod
