= Joseph Brome (British Army officer, died 1825) =

- Died: 4 January 1825; Jamaica
- Military career
- Allegiance: United Kingdom
- Branch: British Army
- Service years: 1794–1868
- Rank: Lieutenant-colonel
- Unit: Royal Artillery
- Commands: HM Bomb Tender Judith; HM Bomb Ship Thunder; No. 3 company 3rd battalion
- Conflicts: Expedition to Ostend (1798); Capture of Minorca (1798); Anglo-Russian invasion of Holland (1799); Raids on Boulogne (1801); Battle of Copenhagen (1807); Walcheren Campaign (1809); Waterloo campaign (1815)

Lieutenant-Colonel Joseph Brome (died 1825) was a British Royal Artillery officer who served during the French Revolutionary and Napoleonic Wars. After attending the Royal Military Academy, Woolwich he was commissioned into the British Army in 1794. Brome was appointed to command HM Bomb Tender Judith in 1797 and saw service with her the following year in the Expedition to Ostend and the Capture of Minorca. In 1799 he participated in the Anglo-Russian invasion of Holland. In 1801 Brome was appointed to command HM Bomb Ship Thunder and served in the Raids on Boulogne, during which he was mentioned in a despatch made by Admiral Nelson. In 1807 he fought during the Battle of Copenhagen and in 1809 in the Walcheren Campaign. During the 1815 Waterloo campaign Brome held a position at Halle, Belgium, covering the British line of retreat, and saw action at the storming of Cambray. He died while serving as commander of the artillery in the West Indies.

== Biography ==
Brome was the adopted son of Joseph Brome (died 1796) a distinguished Royal Artillery officer. (Note: Brome's father had two non-adopted sons, Joseph and Thomas Walton who also served as officers in the Royal Artillery.)

Brome graduated from the Royal Military Academy as second lieutenant in the Royal Artillery (R.A.) on 14 August 1794—the date of the creation of the 5th battalion R.A. to which he was posted at Woolwich. On 22 September the same year he was promoted to first lieutenant and posted to Erith, as second in command of Royal Artillery detachments destined for the East Indies.

On 8 June 1797 Brome returned to England and was appointed to command of H. M. bomb tender, Judith, in the Downs. During 14 May to 25 June 1798 the Judith took part in the expedition to Ostend to destroy the locks of the Bruges Canal under the command of the Duke of York, and later in the year actions on the coast of France. In November of the same year he joined the expedition against Minorca. The next year, in August 1799 he participated in the Anglo-Russian invasion of Holland on the Walcheren.

Brome was promoted to captain-lieutenant of H. M. bomb ship Thunder on 18 April 1801. In August of that year Thunder was part of the fleet that took part in the expedition to Boulogne, and destruction of the French invasion flotilla. In covering the evacuation, he distinguished himself, and was mentioned in a despatch to Admiral Lord Nelson:

Captain Broome, and Lieutenant Beem, of the Royal Artillery, did every thing in their power to annoy the enemy.

— John Conn Captain of HMS Discovery

In January 1802 he was part of the expedition to West Indies where he commanded the bomb ships off Port Royal, Jamaica. In July of the same year he returned to England and was posted to Woolwich for land service in R.A., and joined the 3rd battalion as acting adjutant. On 1 January 1803 he was appointed acting Adjutant of 3rd battalion until his promotion was confirmed on 13 August. On 19 July 1804 his navy rank of captain-lieutenant was converted into second captain in the artillery (captain in the army) and in the same month he was promoted to captain R.A. and placed in command of No. 3 company 3rd battalion (6-pounder field brigade) at Canterbury; and moved to Exeter in December. He returned to Woolwich in 1805.

From December to February 1806 he commanded a light field brigade (6-pr.) on the expedition for defence of Hanover under Sir Arthur Wellesley. The next year (1807) he commanded his 6-pr. light brigade on the Expedition to Copenhagen under the overall command of Sir Arthur Wellesley and Major General Thomas Blomefield in command of the Royal Artillery contingent, and took part in the investment and siege of Copenhagen.

In 1809 he commanded the light brigade of the Royal Artillery on the expedition to Walcheren, and was engaged in both first and second operations of the Scheldt expedition, including actions of Walcheren and South Beleland under the command of Brigadier-General John Macleod, R.A.

On 4 July 1813 he received a promotion to Brevet Major. He took part in the Waterloo Campaign as commander of a brigade of 9-pounder field artillery but did not fight at the Battle of Waterloo because he was stationed at Hal to prevent a possible French attack towards Mons and to protect the British line of retreat to the coast. He did take part in the siege of Cambray and other actions during the advance on Paris.

He returned to Woolwich in 1816 and was posted to Gibraltar in 1819. On 8 August 1821 he was promoted to Regimental Major, R.A., and commandant of R.A. in the West Indies, where in 1823 he was promoted to Regimental Lieutenant-Colonel. He died on 4 January 1825 in Jamaica.

== Notes ==
Citations
