= William Wylde =

British Army general

General William Wylde CB
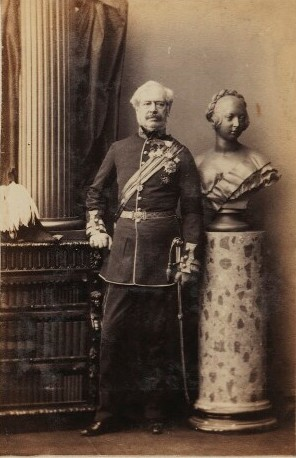
- William Wylde, 1861
- Born: 12 March 1788
- Died: 14 April 1877 (aged 89)
- Military career
- Allegiance: United Kingdom
- Branch: British Army
- Rank: General
- Awards: Companion of the Order of the Bath

General William Wylde CB (12 March 1788 – 14 April 1877) was Master Gunner, St James's Park, the most senior ceremonial position in the Royal Artillery after the Sovereign.

== Military career ==
Wylde was commissioned into the Royal Artillery in 1803 and rose through the officer ranks to become a Lieutenant-General in 1863. In the First Carlist War, he was British Commissioner to the Christinist Army, and played a significant role as artilleryman in relieving the siege of Bilbao by Carlist forces.

He was made Colonel Commandant of the Royal Artillery in 1863 and promoted to full General in 1866, and then held the position of Master Gunner, St James's Park from 1868.

He was also a Groom of the Bedchamber to the Prince Consort.

He died in 1877 and is buried in Brompton Cemetery in London.

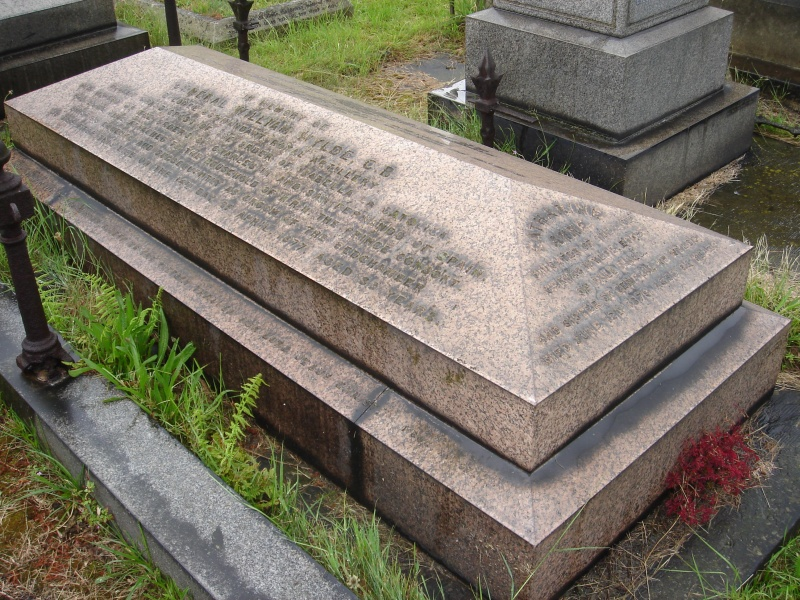
Funerary monument, Brompton Cemetery, London

== Family ==
Wylde was a member of a Nottinghamshire family, the second son of Gervas Wylde and Catherine née Shudall. He married Eleanor MacCutcheon and they had three sons and three daughters. Eldest son William Henry Wylde (1819–1909) of Chiswick distinguished himself in the Foreign Office.

Honorary titles
Preceded by Sir Hew Dalrymple Ross	Master Gunner, St James's Park; 1868–1877	Succeeded by Sir John Bloomfield
