= Francis Ward (British Army officer) =

British Army general

Major-General Francis Ward CB
- Military career
- Allegiance: United Kingdom
- Branch: British Army
- Rank: Major-General
- Awards: Companion of the Order of the Bath

Major-General Francis William Ward CB (1840–1919) was Master Gunner, St James's Park, the most senior ceremonial position in the Royal Artillery after the Sovereign.

== Military career ==
Ward was born in 1840, the son of John Ward. He was educated at the East India Company's Military College at Addiscombe in 1856–7, before entering the Bengal Artillery. He then served during the Indian Mutiny of 1857. He was appointed a Lieutenant in the Royal Bengal Artillery in 1862.

He served on the North West Frontier from 1863 to 1864 and took part in the Second Anglo-Afghan War from 1879 to 1880. He later became a Colonel on the Staff Commanding the Royal Artillery in the Punjab. He rose through the officer ranks and became a major general in 1895.

He was made Colonel Commandant of the Royal Artillery on 1 May 1902 and then held the position of Master Gunner, St James's Park immediately after World War I.

He died in 1919 in London, England.

== Family ==
He married Alice MacMullen, daughter of General S. F. MacMullen of the Bengal Cavalry in 1862.

Honorary titles
Preceded by Sir Robert Biddulph	Master Gunner, St James's Park; 1918–1919	Succeeded by Sir Edward Chapman
