= John St George =

British Army general

General Sir John St George GCB
- Born: 18 January 1812
- Died: 17 March 1891 (aged 79)
- Burial place: Brompton Cemetery, London
- Military career
- Allegiance: United Kingdom
- Branch: British Army
- Rank: General
- Conflicts: Crimean War
- Awards: Knight Grand Cross of the Order of the Bath

General Sir John St George GCB (18 January 1812 – 17 March 1891) was a British Army officer.

== Military career ==
Educated at the Royal Military Academy, Woolwich, John St. George was commissioned into the Royal Regiment of Artillery in 1828. He was decorated for his conduct during the Crimean War, where he commanded the siege train at the fall of Sevastopol in 1855.

From 1859 to 1869 he was successively President of the Ordnance Committee and then Director of Ordnance at the War Office.

He was Master Gunner, St. James's Park, the ceremonial head of the Royal Regiment of Artillery from 1884 to 1891, and was appointed Colonel Commandant of the 21st and 26th (Royal Arsenal) Kent Rifle Volunteer Corps in 1864.

He is buried in Brompton Cemetery, London.

== Ancestry ==
He was born on 18 January 1812, the eldest son of Lieutenant-colonel John St. George of Parkfield, Birkenhead, by Frances, daughter of Archibald Campbell, M.D.

His coat of arms was painted in watercolours and is blazoned as: Lt Gen Sir John St. George KC – Arms: Quarterly of six, 1st Argent a chief Azure overall a lion rampant Gules ducally crowned Or (St. George), 2nd Argent a cross flory Sable (St. George ancient), 3rd Gules three covered cups Or (Argentine), 4th Argent a fess between six annulets Gules (Avenel), 5th Azure a fess dancetty between six escallops Or (Engaine), 6th Argent a sun of sixteen points Gules (Delahay). Crest: A demi lion rampant gules ducally crowned Or armed and langued Azure. Motto: Firmitas in Coelo (Stability in Heaven).

== Family ==
In 1860 he married Elizabeth Marianne Evans (b. 1829, bapt. 5 April 1829 in Selsey, Sussex), daughter of Thomas Evans, esquire (b. about 1795 in Hampreston, Dorset) and his wife Margaret Harris (m. 16 Feb 1819 in St Marylebone Parish, Middlesex).

Their son, Capt. Baldwin John St George KCB (16 Feb 1862 in Knightsbridge, Middlesex – 6 November 1912 in Worcester, Worcestershire), married Susan Sybil Staplehurst (1862 in Maresfield or Uckfield, Sussex – 13 September 1939 in Worcestershire), daughter of George Staplehurst, on 13 July 1894 at Holy Trinity, Brompton, Kensington and Chelsea, England.

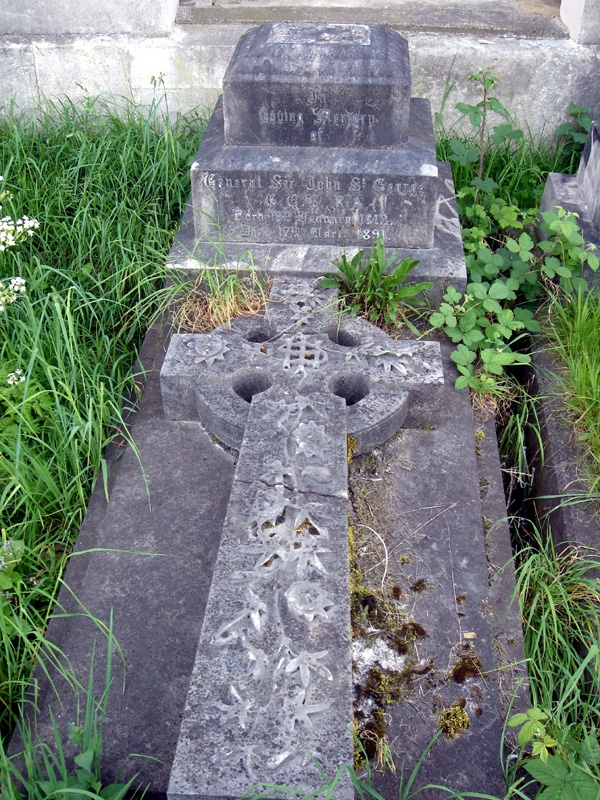
Funerary monument, Brompton Cemetery, London

Honorary titles
Preceded by Poole England	Master Gunner, St. James's Park; 1884–1891	Succeeded by Sir Collingwood Dickson
