= Henry Kelham =

British Army general

Brigadier-General Henry Kelham CB
- Born: 1853
- Died: 4 October 1931 (aged 77–78)
- Military career
- Allegiance: United Kingdom
- Branch: British Army
- Rank: Brigadier-General
- Commands: 3rd Bn Highland Light Infantry; Lowland Division
- Conflicts: Anglo–Egyptian War; Second Boer War
- Awards: Companion of the Order of the Bath

Brigadier-General Henry Robert Kelham CB (1853 – 4 October 1931) was a senior British Army officer.

== Military career ==
Kelham was commissioned into the 74th (Highland) Regiment of Foot as a lieutenant on 28 May 1873. He was promoted to captain on 7 January 1882, and fought at the Battle of Tell El Kebir in September 1882 during the Anglo–Egyptian War. Promoted to major on 31 January 1890, he served with the 1st battalion in the occupation of Crete in 1898.

Kelham was promoted to lieutenant-colonel on 4 November 1899, and appointed in command of the 1st Battalion, Highland Light Infantry, which was sent to South Africa to reinforce British troops during the Second Boer War. For his service in the war, he was mentioned in dispatches, and appointed a Companion of the Order of the Bath (CB). The battalion stayed in South Africa throughout the war, which ended on 31 May 1902, when they were reassigned to Egypt. Kelham was in command of 700 officers and men when they left Durban for Egypt on the SS Plassy in January 1903.

Promoted to colonel in November 1903, he went on to become the first general officer commanding (GOC) of the Lowland Division, part of the newly created Territorial Force (TF), on 1 April 1908.

He relinquished this command and was placed on half-pay and retiring from the army in March 1910. He was promoted to the honorary rank of brigadier general in February 1912.

Military offices
| New title | GOC Lowland Division; 1908–1910 | Succeeded by James Spens |
