= Frederick Wing =

British Army general

Major-General Frederick Wing CB
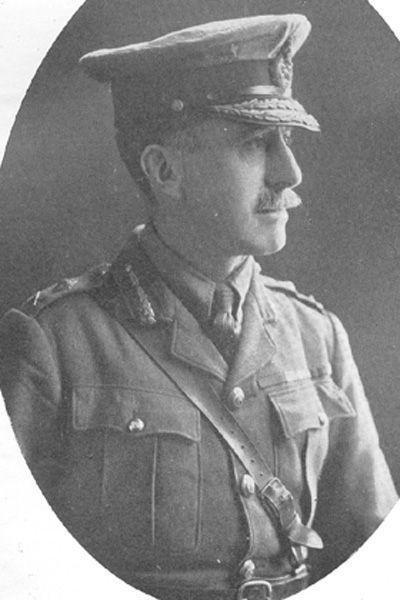
- Born: 29 November 1860; Christchurch, Hampshire, England
- Died: 2 October 1915 (aged 54); Mazingarbe, France
- Military career
- Allegiance: United Kingdom
- Branch: British Army
- Service years: 1880–1915
- Rank: Major-General
- Unit: Royal Artillery
- Commands: 12th (Eastern) Division
- Conflicts: Second Boer War; First World War †
- Awards: Companion of the Order of the Bath; Mentioned in dispatches

Major-General Frederick Drummond Vincent Wing, CB (29 November 1860 – 2 October 1915) was a senior officer of the British Army during the First World War and was one of three British divisional commanders killed in action in the space of a week in the aftermath of the Battle of Loos. Wing had served in the army for over thirty years at the time of his death, having been commissioned into the Royal Artillery in 1880. He had served with distinction in the Second Boer War and been an aide de camp to Lord Roberts in 1903.

== Military career ==
Frederick Wing was born in Christchurch, Hampshire in November 1860, the son of Major Vincent Wing and Gertrude Elizabeth Wing (née Vane). In May 1880 aged nineteen, Wing joined the Royal Horse Artillery after graduating from the Royal Military Academy, Woolwich. Wing rose in prominence in the regiment, and was promoted to captain on 12 September 1888 (or 13 October 1893?), and major on 31 March 1898. He was on 25 April 1892 appointed as an aide-de-camp to Lieutenant General Sir Evelyn Wood.

He served in South Africa for the Second Boer War between 1899 and 1902, where he took part in operations in Natal in late 1899, including engagements at Talana. The following year, he took part in the defence of Ladysmith and was present at the Battle of Lombard's Kop, where he was slightly wounded, and for which he was mentioned in despatches and received a brevet promotion as lieutenant-colonel on 29 November 1900. In early 1902, he was again wounded, but discharged to duty shortly before the end of hostilities, in May 1902. In a despatch dated 23 June 1902, Lord Kitchener wrote that Wing had "high reputation for boldness and dash" and had "rendered good service." He left Cape Town on board the SS Dunvegan Castle in late June 1902, and arrived at Southampton the next month. For his service in the war, he was appointed a Companion of the Order of the Bath (CB) in the October 1902 South Africa Honours list.

Following his return to the United Kingdom, Wing was appointed in command of the Z Battery, Royal Horse Artillery, stationed at Newbridge. He did not stay there long, however, as he was seconded to the staff of Lord Roberts, whom he served as aide-de-camp in 1903.

In 1905, Wing married Mary FitzClarence, sister of Charles FitzClarence VC and a granddaughter of the Earl of Munster and Earl of Clonmell. In November 1905 he was promoted to lieutenant colonel. After serving as a staff officer for the Royal Horse Artillery and the RFA, Wing was promoted to colonel became an assistant adjutant-general at the War Office in September 1910.

In January 1913, Wing was promoted to the temporary rank of brigadier general and given command of the artillery of the 3rd Division and accompanied them to France in 1914 at the outbreak of the First World War. Wing, promoted to major general in October 1914, for “distinguished conduct in the Field”, served at all the major battles of 1914 and was wounded on 22 September 1915 by a shrapnel bullet in the calf, but returned to duty the next day. Wing also had a close escape early in 1915, when a German shell burst directly over his car during a tour of his artillery positions. Wing was unhurt in the blast, but his chauffeur was wounded in the arm. He temporarily commanded the 3rd Division from 29 October to 21 November, when Major General Aylmer Haldane took over as GOC.

Later in 1915, Wing took overall command of the newly raised New Army 12th (Eastern) Division. In the September 1915 Battle of Loos, generals George Thesiger and Thompson Capper were killed, and less than a week later, on 2 October 1915, a shell exploded in the road outside the 12th Division's forward report centre at Mazingarbe and killed Wing and his aide-de-camp, Lieutenant C. C. Tower of the Essex Yeomanry, outright at 3:45pm. Both were buried in the nearby Noeux-les-Mines Communal Cemetery which is now maintained by the Commonwealth War Graves Commission.

== Time for his men ==
In the diaries of Lieut A A de Jongh of the 7th Battalion, Suffolks who fought at Loos under Major General Wing, he described meeting him on 5 June 1915 while marching to Campagne. "On the way we passed Major General Wing our Divisional Commander, a simply topping man. He stopped his car and I had quite a long chat with him." On 8 July 1915, he inspected the trenches just outside Plugstreet (Ploegsteert) where Lieut. de Jongh was based. "He was please with everything and spent a long time with me."

== Bibliography ==
- Davies, Frank (1997). Bloody Red Tabs: General Officer Casualties of the Great War 1914–1918. London: Pen & Sword Books. ISBN 978-0-85052-463-5.

Military offices
Preceded by James Spens	GOC 12th (Eastern) Division; March−October 1915	Succeeded by A. B. Scott
