= Joseph Brome (British Army officer, died 1796) =

British Army general

Major-General Joseph Brome
- Born: c. 1713
- Died: 1796
- Military career
- Allegiance: United Kingdom
- Branch: British Army
- Rank: Major-General
- Conflicts: American Revolutionary War

Major-General Joseph Brome (c. 1713–1796) was Master Gunner, St James's Park, the most senior Ceremonial Post in the Royal Artillery after the Sovereign.

== Biography ==
Joseph Brome was the son of Charles Brome, who enlisted as a boy matross (an apprentice gunner) in 1698 and retired as a captain in the Royal Artillery in 1760.

Brome joined the British Army as a drummer boy aged eight years. He went on to command the 1st Battalion of the Royal Artillery.

He held the position of Master Gunner, St James's Park from 1760 and, later, of Colonel Commandant of the Royal Artillery as well.

He was promoted to Major-General in 1793 and died in 1796, after serving in the Royal Artillery for 75 years.

== Family ==
Broom had two stepsons, Joseph Walton and Thomas Walton both of whom also served in the Royal Artillery. The former from 1753 until 1806 (62 years service) and the latter from 1760 until 1830 (31 years service). He also had an adopted son Joseph Brome (died 1825) who also had a distinguished military career serving in the Royal Artillery for 31 years.

== Notes ==
Honorary titles
Preceded by James Deal	Master Gunner, St James's Park; 1760–1769	Succeeded by Held by an NCO
