= James Spens (British Army officer) =

English cricketer and British Army officer

Major-General James Spens CB CMG
- Born: 30 March 1853; Sabathu, Punjab Province, British India
- Died: 19 June 1934 (aged 81); Folkestone, Kent, England
- Military career
- Allegiance: United Kingdom
- Branch: British Army
- Service years: 1872–1916
- Rank: Major-General
- Commands: 2nd Bn, King's Shropshire Light Infantry; Lowland Division; 12th (Eastern) Division
- Conflicts: Second Anglo-Afghan War; Second Boer War; First World War
- Awards: Order of the Bath; Order of St Michael and St George
- Cricket career

Cricket information
- Batting: Right-handed
- Bowling: Unknown-arm roundarm medium

Domestic team information
- Years: Team
- 1884–1899: Hampshire
- 1886–1888: Marylebone Cricket Club

Career statistics
Competition	First-class
Matches	13
Runs scored	581
Batting average	31.40
100s/50s	1/3
Top score	118*
Balls bowled	15
Wickets	0
Bowling average	–
5 wickets in innings	–
10 wickets in match	–
Best bowling	–
Catches/stumpings	6/–
- Source: James Spens at Cricinfo

Major-General James Spens CB CMG (30 March 1853 — 19 August 1934) was a British Army officer and an English first-class cricketer. Spens began playing cricket whilst at school, and after joining the Army played at first-class level for Hampshire and the Marylebone Cricket Club in the 1880s and 1890s. He served with distinction during the Second Boer War and later commanded a military district in British India and a Territorial division in the United Kingdom. He retired shortly before the outbreak of the First World War, but returned to service to command the 12th (Eastern) Division, then a training depot and a military district in Egypt.

== Early military career and cricket ==
The son of the Royal Engineer James Spens senior, he was born in March 1853 at Sabathu in British India. He was educated in England at Haileybury and Imperial Service College, where he represented the college cricket team from 1868 to 1870. From there, he attended the Royal Military College at Sandhurst, graduating into the 85th Regiment of Foot (Bucks Volunteers) as a sub-lieutenant in May 1872. Two years later in June 1874, he was promoted to lieutenant, antedated to the date of his initial commission. After joining the army, Spens played both cricket and rackets for army teams, including a match at Lord's in 1887. He was a high scorer, at one point in 1882 hitting 386 in a match. In rackets, he competed in the English Amateur Rackets Championships. His cricketing activities for the army were interrupted by military duties in 1879–80, when his regiment served in the Second Anglo-Afghan War. Following the war, he was promoted to captain in July 1883, at which point he was serving with the King's Shropshire Light Infantry. A further promotion to major followed in April 1886, with Spens being appointed an instructor of tactics at Sandhurst in September of the same year.

After his return to England, Spens made his first-class debut for Hampshire against Kent in 1884. On debut, he scored his maiden first-class half century with a score of 60. Two years later, Spens played first-class cricket for the Marylebone Cricket Club, making his debut for the club against Derbyshire and playing two more matches, against Lancashire and Nottinghamshire. In 1897, fourteen years after playing his last first-class match for Hampshire, Spens returned to play for county, with his first return match coming against Cambridge University and a second match in the same season against the Gentlemen of Philadelphia, which gave him his only first-class century with a score of 118 not out. In 1898, Spens played two matches in the County Championship, before making a further five appearances in the 1899 County Championship. In ten first-class matches for Hampshire, he scored 546 runs at an average of 28.73. Wisden described him as "a free hitter, a clever medium paced round-arm bowler and a very smart cover point [fielder]".

== Senior command ==
Following his promotion to lieutenant colonel in February 1898, Spens was sent to South Africa following the outbreak of the Second Boer War in October 1899. He initially commanded the 2nd Battalion, King's Shropshire Light Infantry (KSLI), followed by a promotion to the local rank of colonel and command of an infantry brigade in January 1901. He was lastly placed in command of a mobile column in 1901–1902. He was promoted to the brevet rank of colonel during the war, and mentioned in dispatches several times (including by Major General Lord Kitchener on 23 June 1902).

After the end of the war in May 1902, he returned to the United Kingdom aboard the SS Dunottar Castle, which arrived at Southampton the following month. For his service in the war Spens was appointed a Companion of the Order of the Bath in the April 1901 South Africa Honours list. He received the actual decoration from King Edward VII at Buckingham Palace on 24 October 1902, for whom he also an aide-de-camp to.

He was placed on half-pay in August 1902, but returned to service on 12 August 1903 as commander of the Allahabad District in India and was promoted to substantive colonel and, in addition, was granted the temporary rank of brigadier general whilst so employed in this role. He was then conmander of the 21st Bareilly Brigade in India in March 1906. He was promoted to major general in December 1906.

He was made general officer commanding (GOC) of the Lowland Division in the Territorial Force (TF) in March 1910, taking over from Brigadier General Henry Kelham. He relinquished command and retired from the army in July 1914.

On the outbreak of the First World War just a few weeks later, however, Spens was recalled to service, and given command of the newly raised 12th (Eastern) Division of the New Armies in August 1914. He commanded it through its training in England, relinquishing command to the younger Major General Frederick Wing, who unlike Spens had recent combat experience on the Western Front, in March 1915 before it was sent overseas, and in April was appointed to take over command of the ANZAC Training Depot in Egypt. He remained here until November, when he became GOC Cairo District. Spens left Cairo in April 1916. In the 1916 Birthday Honours, he was appointed a Companion to the Order of St Michael and St George (CMG), "for services rendered in connection with Military Operations in the Field".

In later life, he was politically aligned to the British Fascists.

Spens died at the age of 81 at Folkestone, Kent, on 19 June 1934.

Military offices
Preceded by Henry Kelham	GOC Lowland Division; 1910–1914	Succeeded by Granville Egerton
Preceded by New formation	GOC 12th (Eastern) Division; 1914–1915	Succeeded by Frederick Wing
