= John Macleod (British Army officer) =

Lieutenant-General Sir John Macleod GCH
- Born: 29 January 1752; Isle of Skye
- Died: 26 January 1833 (aged 80); Woolwich, London, England
- Alma mater: Royal Military Academy, Woolwich
- Military career
- Allegiance: United Kingdom
- Branch: British Army
- Service years: 1767–1833
- Rank: Lieutenant-general
- Unit: Royal Artillery
- Conflicts: American Revolutionary War; Napoleonic Wars; Walcheren Expedition
- Awards: Royal Guelphic Order

Lieutenant-General Sir John Angus Macleod GCH (29 January 1752 – 26 January 1833) was Master Gunner, St James's Park, the most senior ceremonial post in the Royal Artillery after the sovereign.

== Military career ==
Educated at the Royal Military Academy, Woolwich, Macleod was commissioned into the Royal Artillery in 1771.

In 1781, he was ordered to join the force under Earl Cornwallis which was sent to North Carolina and which took part in the Battle of Guilford. He was, in 1782, appointed Commander of the Royal Artillery at a time when they had just five battalions. He was appointed Deputy Adjutant-General of the Royal Artillery, an honorary position, in 1795. Under Macleod's direction the Royal Artillery had been expanded to ten battalions by 1808. He also held the position of Master Gunner, St James's Park from 1808.

In 1809, he was involved in the expedition to Walcheren. After the Battle of Waterloo, the Duke of Wellington appointed him Director-General of the Royal Artillery.

In April 1827, he was given command of the Field Train, again an honorary position.

== Personal life ==
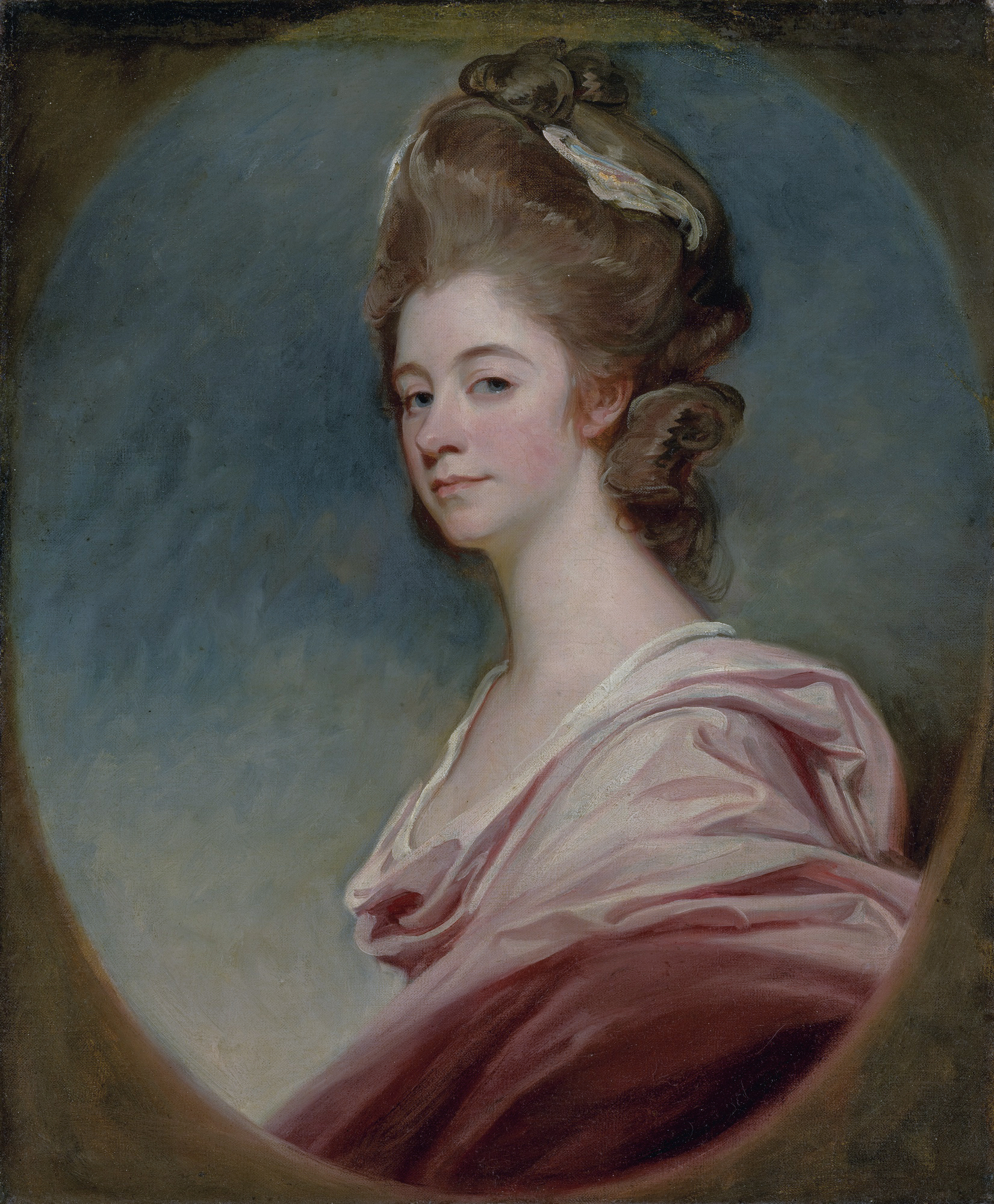
Emilia Kerr (1756–1832), by George Romney

On 2 January 1783, Macleod was married to Lady Wilhelmina Emilia Kerr, the daughter of William Kerr, 4th Marquess of Lothian.

He died in Woolwich in 1833.

Honorary titles
Preceded by Joseph Walton	Master Gunner, St James's Park; 1808–1833	Succeeded by Sir Alexander Dickson
