= Alexander Dickson (British Army officer) =

Army officer during the Napoleonic Wars and the Peninsular War

Major-General Sir Alexander Dickson GCB KCH FRGS
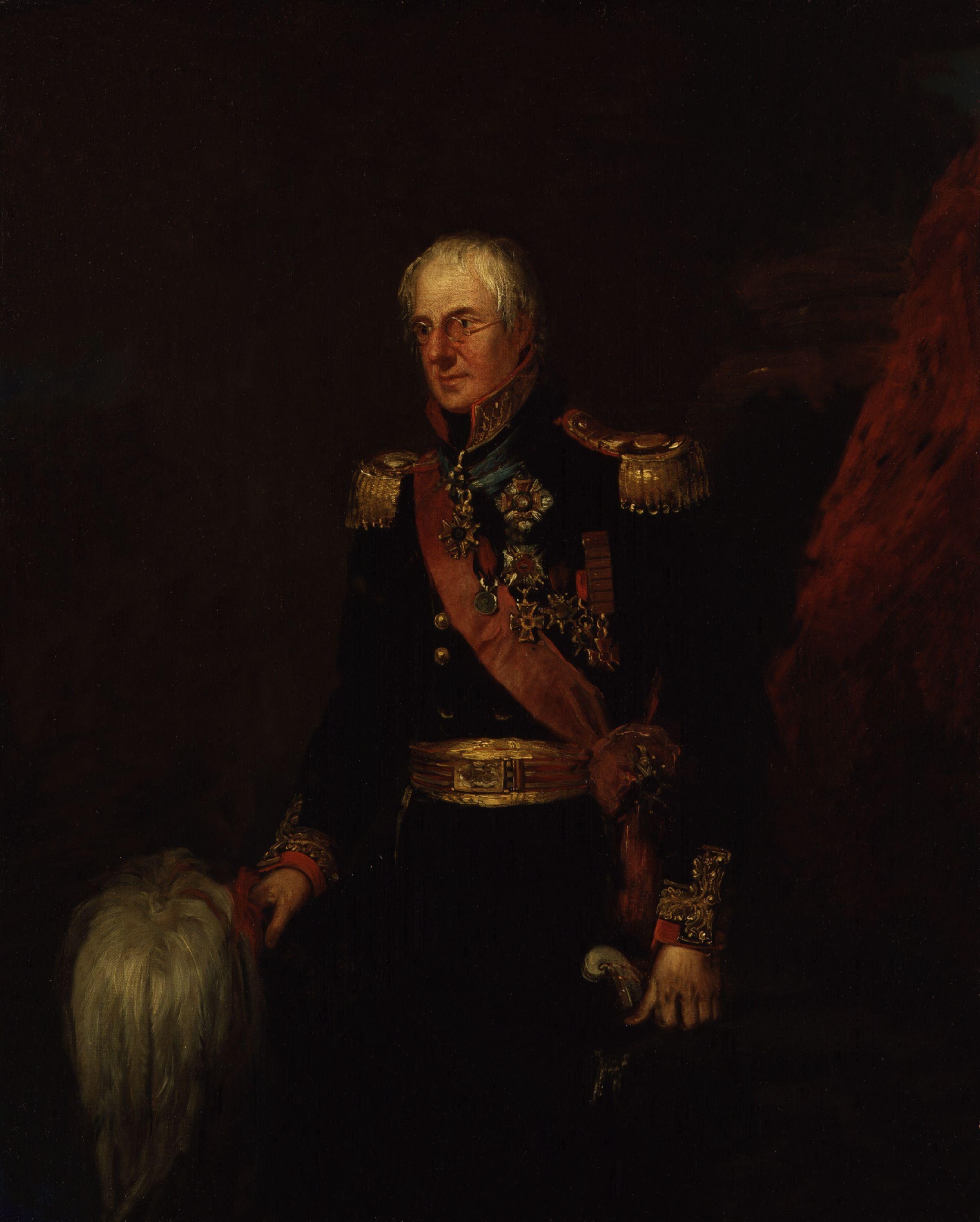
- Born: 3 June 1777; Sydenham House, Roxburghshire
- Died: 22 April 1840 (aged 62); London
- Burial place: Plumstead old churchyard, Plumstead, Middlesex
- Relatives: General Sir Collingwood Dickson (son)
- Military career
- Allegiance: United Kingdom
- Branch: British Army
- Service years: 1793–1840
- Rank: Major-General
- Conflicts: Napoleonic Wars; Peninsular War; War of 1812
- Awards: Knight Grand Cross of the Order of the Bath; Knight Commander of the Royal Guelphic Order

Major-General Sir Alexander Dickson GCB KCH FRGS (3 June 1777 – 22 April 1840) was a British Army officer who served in the artillery. He fought at many battles during the Napoleonic Wars. Arthur Wellesley, 1st Duke of Wellington had the highest opinion of his abilities and made him the effective commander of his army's artillery during the latter part of the Peninsular War.

== Military career ==
Dickson entered the Royal Military Academy in 1793, passing out as second lieutenant in the Royal Artillery in the following year. As a subaltern he saw service in Menorca in 1798 and at Malta in 1800. As a captain he took part in the unfortunate Montevideo Expedition of 1806–07, and in 1809 he accompanied Brigadier General Edward Howorth to Portugal where he served as brigade-major of the artillery.

He soon obtained a command in the Portuguese artillery, and as a lieutenant colonel of the Portuguese service took part in the various battles of 1810–11. At the sieges of Ciudad Rodrigo, Badajoz, the Salamanca forts, and Burgos, he was entrusted by Wellington with most of the detailed artillery work. At the Battle of Salamanca he commanded the reserve artillery. In the end he became commander of the whole of the artillery of the allied army, and though still only a substantive captain in the British service, he had under his orders some 8000 men. He played a key role in the successful conclusion of the Siege of San Sebastián in 1813. At the battles of Vitoria, the Pyrenees and Toulouse he directed the movements of the artillery engaged, and at the end of the war received handsome presents from the officers who had served under him, many of whom were his seniors in the army list.

He was at the disastrous Battle of New Orleans, but returned to Europe in time for the Waterloo campaign. He was present at Quatre Bras and Waterloo on the artillery staff of Wellington's army, and subsequently commanded the British battering train at the sieges of the French fortresses left behind the advancing allies. For the rest of his life he was on home service, principally as a staff officer of artillery with the rank of major general and title of Master Gunner St James's Park.

During the Peninsular War he was present at the battles of Busaco, Albuera, Ciudad Rodrigo, Battle of Badajoz, Salamanca, Vittoria, San Sebastián, Nivelle, Nive, and Toulouse. His Peninsular Gold Medal had six clasps – only the Duke of Wellington, with nine clasps, Sir Dennis Pack and Lord Beresford, with seven each, had more clasps to their medal.

== Later career ==
He died, a major general and Knight Grand Cross of the Order of the Bath, in 1840. A memorial was erected at Woolwich in 1847. Dickson was one of the earliest fellows of the Royal Geographical Society.

His diaries kept in the Peninsula were the main source of information used in Duncan's History of the Royal Artillery.

== Notes ==
Honorary titles
Preceded by Sir John Macleod	Master Gunner, St James's Park; 1833–1840	Succeeded by Sir Robert Gardiner
