= List of British Army full generals =

This is a list of full generals in the British Army since the Acts of Union 1707 when the English Army and the Scots Army were combined.

The rank of general (or full general to distinguish it from the lower general officer ranks) is the highest rank currently achievable by serving officers in the British Army. It ranks above lieutenant-general and below field marshal which is now only awarded as an honorary rank.

The annotation "Held rank in the East Indies." indicates that the officer served in India in the army of the East India Company - the Presidency armies. After the East India Company was replaced by government rule, its armies became the British Indian Army, a separate organisation from the British Army. (Note: The "Army of India" was the Indian Army plus the 'British Army in India' (British units sent to India))

== 1707–1800 ==
Promoted	Name	Born	Died	Notes
19 April 1690	Meinhardt Schomberg, 3rd Duke of Schomberg	1641	1719	Promoted in the English Army before the 1707 Act of Union. Full general rank was general of horse. While Haydn's Book of Dignities gives Schomberg's promotion date as 16 August 1703, this is disputed on the grounds of its inaccuracy.
3 July 1704	Henri de Massue, Earl of Galway	1648	1720	Served in the French Army until the Revocation of the Edict of Nantes when he was granted an English commission. Promoted to full general before the Act of Union.
31 March 1705	Charles Mordaunt, 3rd Earl of Peterborough	1658	1735	Promoted before the Act of Union.
1 January 1707	Charles Churchill	1656	1714	Promoted a few days before the Act of Union.
22 April 1708	Richard Savage, 4th Earl Rivers	c. 1654	1712	Served as Constable of the Tower.
1 January 1709	Daniel Harvey	c. 1665	1732	Pursued a political career as a general. In 1707 he was elected member of parliament for Clitheroe,
31 January 1711	George Hamilton, 1st Earl of Orkney	1666	1737	Full general rank was general of foot. Promoted to field marshal in 1736.
30 January 1711	William Steuart	1643	1726	Full general rank was general of foot. Published in the London Gazette on 6 February.
30 January 1711	Thomas Erle	1650	1720	Served as Lieutenant-General of the Ordnance and Governor of Portsmouth.
30 January 1711	David Colyear, 1st Earl of Portmore	c. 1656	1730	Served under the Duke of Ormonde in Flanders.
30 January 1711	Henry Lumley	c. 1658	1722	Lumley's full general rank was general of horse.
16 June 1712	John Richmond Webb	1667	1724	Served as commander of land forces in Great Britain.
27 September 1714	John Campbell, 2nd Duke of Argyll	1678	1743	Full general rank was general of foot. Promoted to field marshal in 1736.
13 November 1714	Charles O'Hara, 1st Baron Tyrawley	1640	1724	The promotion was gazetted on 19 November 1714.
12 July 1717	William Cadogan, 1st Earl Cadogan	1675	1726	
1 March 1727	George Cholmondeley, 2nd Earl of Cholmondeley	1666	1733	Full general rank was general of horse. His promotion was gazetted on 15 April 1727.
22 June 1728	Charles Ross	1667	1732	Ross's full general rank was general of horse. Haydn's Book of Dignities gives Ross's promotion date as 1 April 1712.
2 July 1730 (Note: promotion was not gazetted until 17 July 1739.)	Sir Charles Wills	1666	1741	Full general rank was general of foot.
2 July 1730	Thomas Whetham	c. 1665	1741	Full general rank was general of foot.
2 July 1730	Joseph Sabine	1661	1739	Full general rank was general of foot.
2 July 1730	William Evans		1740	Full general rank was general of horse.
27 October 1735	Richard Temple, 1st Viscount Cobham	1675	1749	Promoted to field marshal in 1742.
27 October 1735	John Dalrymple, 2nd Earl of Stair	1673	1747	
18 December 1735	François de La Rochefoucauld, marquis de Montandre	1672	1739	Full general rank was general of foot. Promoted to field marshal in 1739.
18 December 1735	Richard Boyle, 2nd Viscount Shannon	1675	1740	Full general rank was general of horse. Promoted to field marshal in 1739
17 July 1739	George Wade	1673	1748	Full general rank was general of horse. Promoted to field marshal on 17 December 1743.
26 February 1743	Sir Philip Honywood	c. 1677	1752	Full general rank was general of horse. Haydn's Book of Dignities gives Honywood's promotion date as 1 February 1743.
26 February 1743	Lord Mark Kerr	1676	1752	Kerr's full general rank was general of foot. Haydn's Book of Dignities gives Kerr's promotion date as 1 February 1743.
6 April 1745	John Murray, 2nd Earl of Dunmore	1685	1752	Full general rank was general of foot.
3 January 1746	Sir John Ligonier	1680	1770	Full general rank was general of horse. Promoted to field marshal in 1757; later Viscount then Earl Ligonier.
24 March 1746	Richard Molesworth, 3rd Viscount Molesworth	1680	1758	Full general rank was general of horse. Promoted to field marshal in 1757.
24 March 1747	Robert Dalzell	1662	1758	Full general rank was general of foot.
24 March 1747	Gervais Parker	1695	1750	Full general rank was general of foot.
26 March 1747	Algernon Seymour, 7th Duke of Somerset	1684	1750	Styled Earl of Hertford until 1748.
28 March 1747	John Montagu, 2nd Duke of Montagu	1690	1749	Full general rank was general of horse.
29 March 1747	Sir Robert Rich, 4th Baronet	1685	1768	Full general rank was general of horse. Promoted to field marshal on 28 November 1757.
30 March 1747	William Stanhope, 1st Earl of Harrington	c. 1690	1756	Full general rank was general of foot.
10 July 1758	David Montolieu, Baron de St Hippolyte	1669	1761	Huguenot officer in British service. The London Gazette gives the notice of his promotion on 14 March 1761.
29 August 1758	Charles Spencer, 3rd Duke of Marlborough	1706	1758	
10 March 1761	The Hon James St Clair	1688	1762	
14 March 1761	James O'Hara, 2nd Baron Tyrawley	1682	1774	Promoted to field marshal on 10 June 1763.
14 March 1761	John Fane, 9th Earl of Westmorland	1728	1774	Baron Burghersh and Earl of Westmorland from November 1771.
14 March 1761	Roger Handasyd	1684	1763	
March 1761	Charles James Otway	1694	1764	
March 1761	Charles Cadogan, 2nd Baron Cadogan	1685	1776	
March 1761	John Guise	1682 or 1683	1765	The Oxford Dictionary of National Biography gives his promotion date as 1762.
22 February 1765 (Note: Promotion gazetted on 26 March 1765.)	John Leslie, 11th Earl of Rothes	1744	1773	Full general rank was general of foot.
22 February 1765	Harry Pulteney	1686	1767	Full general rank was general of foot.
22 February 1765	Sir Charles Howard	1696	1765	Full general rank was general of horse.
22 February 1765	John Campbell, 4th Duke of Argyll	1693	1770	Full general rank was general of horse.
22 February 1765	James Oglethorpe	1696	1785	Full general rank was general of foot.
22 February 1765	John West, 1st Earl De La Warr	1693	1766	Full general rank was general of horse. The Oxford Dictionary of National Biography states that De La Warr was promoted to full general in March 1755.
13 April 1770	Sir John Mordaunt	1697	1780	
13 April 1770	The Honourable James Cholmondeley	1708	1775	
13 April 1770	Peregrine Lascelles	1685	1772	
13 April 1770	Lord John Murray	1711	1787	
13 April 1770	John Campbell, 4th Earl of Loudoun	1705	1782	
13 April 1770	William Maule, 1st Earl Panmure	1700	1782	
13 April 1770	William Kerr, 4th Marquess of Lothian	1710	1775	
13 April 1770	William Stanhope, 2nd Earl of Harrington	1719	1779	
13 April 1770	Hugh Warburton	1695	1771	
26 May 1772	Cuthbert Ellison	1698	1785	
26 May 1772	Peregrine Bertie, 3rd Duke of Ancaster and Kesteven	1714	1778	
26 May 1772	Evelyn Pierrepont, 2nd Duke of Kingston-upon-Hull	1711	1773	
26 May 1772	Hugh Boscawen, 2nd Viscount Falmouth	1707	1782	
26 May 1772	Simon Harcourt, 1st Earl Harcourt	1714	1777	
26 May 1772	Henry Herbert, 1st Earl of Powis	1703	1772	
26 May 1772	Michael O'Brien Dilkes	1698	1775	
26 May 1772	John Montagu, 4th Earl of Sandwich	1718	1792	
26 May 1772	Henry Seymour Conway	1721	1795	promoted to field marshal in 1793
26 May 1772	James Abercrombie	1706	1781	
26 May 1772	George Keppel, 3rd Earl of Albemarle	1724	1772	
26 May 1772	Francis Leighton	1696	1773	
26 May 1772	Lord Robert Manners	c. 1721	1782	
26 May 1772	Mostyn John	c. 1709	1779	
26 May 1772	John Waldegrave, 3rd Earl Waldegrave	1718	1784	
26 May 1772	Prince William Henry, Duke of Gloucester and Edinburgh	1743	1805	Promoted to field marshal in 1793
6 September 1777	Sir George Howard	1718	1796	Promoted to field marshal in 1793
6 September 1777	Joseph Yorke, 1st Baron Dover	1724	1792	
6 September 1777	William Belford	1709	1780	
6 September 1777	Bertie Lord Robert	1721	1782	
6 September 1777	Philip Honywood	c. 1710	1785	
19 March 1778	John Campbell, 5th Duke of Argyll	1723	1806	Promotion to general dated 24 March 1778 in the London Gazette. Promoted to field marshal in 1796.
19 March 1778	John Fitzwilliam	1714	1789	Promotion to general dated 24 March 1778 in the London Gazette.
19 March 1778	William Ashe-à Court	1708	1781	Promotion to general dated 24 March 1778 in the London Gazette.
19 March 1778	Jeffery Amherst, 1st Baron Amherst	1717	1797	Promotion to general dated 24 March 1778 in the London Gazette. Promoted to field marshal in 1796.
2 April 1778	Sir John Griffin Griffin	1719	1797	Promotion to general dated 14 April 1778 in the London Gazette. Later Baron Howard de Walden and then Baron Braybrooke. Promoted to field marshal on 30 July 1796.
2 April 1778	Studholme Hodgson	1708	1798	Promotion to general dated 14 April 1778 in the London Gazette. Promoted to field marshal on 30 July 1796.
2 April 1778	George Augustus Eliott	1717	1790	Promotion to general dated 14 April 1778 in the London Gazette. Later Baron Heathfield.
14 April 1778	Archibald Douglas	1707	1778	
23 February 1782	Sir Guy Carleton	1724	1808	Later Baron Dorchester.
20 November 1782	John Lambton	1710	1794	
20 November 1782	Parslow John	unknown	1786	
20 November 1782	The Honourable Thomas Gage	1719	1787	
20 November 1782	George Townshend, 1st Marquess Townshend	1724	1807	Promoted to field marshal on 30 July 1796.
20 November 1782	Lord Frederick Cavendish	1729	1803	Promoted to field marshal on 30 July 1796.
20 November 1782	Charles Lennox, 3rd Duke of Richmond	1735	1806	Promoted to field marshal in 1796.
20 November 1782	Henry Herbert, 10th Earl of Pembroke	1734	1794	
20 November 1782	John Severn	c. 1699	1787	Surname also given as Severne.
20 November 1782	Sir John Sebright	1725	1794	
20 November 1782	George Cary	1712	1792	
19 February 1783	The Honourable James Murray	1721	1794	
19 February 1783	Cyrus Trapaud	1715	1801	
19 February 1783	Sir William Boothby	1721	1787	
19 February 1783	Benjamin Carpenter	c. 1713-14	1788	
19 February 1783	Bigoe Armstrong	1717	1794	
19 February 1783	William Petty, 2nd Earl of Shelburne	1737	1805	First Marquess of Lansdowne from 1784.
19 February 1783	William Haviland	1718	1784	The Oxford Dictionary of National Biography gives Haviland's promotion date as 17 February 1783.
19 February 1783	The Right Honourable Sir John Irwin	1727 or 1728	1788	
19 February 1783	Charles Vernon	1719	1810	
19 February 1783	David Graeme	1716	1798	
12 April 1793	Prince Frederick Augustus, Duke of York and Albany	1763	1827	Promoted to field marshal in 1795.
25 October 1793 (Note: The London Gazette records his promotion date as 18 October 1793.)	Robert Melvill	1723	1809	
25 October 1793	Marisco Frederick	unknown	1801	
25 October 1793	Robert Dalrymple-Horn-Elphinstone	1718	1794	
25 October 1793	James Johnston	abt 1721	1797	Often known as 'Irish' Johnston to distinguish him from another general of the same name and much the same age.
25 October 1793	James Johnston	1721	1795	Often known as "Johnston of the Blues" to distinguish him from another general of the same name and much the same age.
25 October 1793	Charles Moore, 1st Marquess of Drogheda	1730	1822	Promoted to field marshal in 1821.
25 October 1793	Sir William Pitt	c. 1728	1809	
25 October 1793	Lord Adam Gordon	c. 1726	1801	>
25 October 1793	Sir Alexander Maitland	1728	1820	
25 October 1793	Archibald Montgomerie, 11th Earl of Eglinton	1726	1796	
25 October 1793	Hunt Walsh	1720	1795	
25 October 1793	Guy Carleton, 1st Baron Dorchester	1724	1808	
25 October 1793	Sir Charles Hotham-Thompson	1729	1794	
25 October 1793	Robert Clerk	c. 1720	1797	
25 October 1793	Robert Cuninghame, 1st Baron Rossmore	1726	1801	Lord Rossmore from 1796 onwards.
25 October 1793	William Howe, 5th Viscount Howe	1729	1814	Lord Howe from 1799 onwards.
25 October 1793	Lord George Henry Lennox	1737	1805	
25 October 1793	Henry Fletcher	unknown	1803	
25 October 1793	John Hale	1728	1806	
25 October 1793	Sir Robert Boyd	c. 1710	1794	
25 October 1793	Sir Henry Clinton	1730	1795	
25 October 1793	Charles FitzRoy, 1st Baron Southampton	1737	1797	
25 October 1793	Bernard Hale	1725?	1798	
25 October 1793	Francis Craig	unknown	1811	
25 October 1793	Hugh Percy, 2nd Duke of Northumberland	1742	1817	
25 October 1793	William Taylor	unknown	1793	
25 October 1793	Charles Cornwallis, 1st Marquess Cornwallis	1738	1805	
3 May 1796 (Note: The London Gazette records his promotion date as 14 May 1796.)	Sir David Lindsay	unknown	1797	
3 May 1796	Edward Maxwell Brown	unknown	1803	
3 May 1796	James Robinson	unknown	unknown	
3 May 1796	Eyre Massey, 1st Baron Clarina	1719	1804	
3 May 1796	George Warde	1725	1803	
3 May 1796	Flower Mocher	abt 1729	1801	
3 May 1796	Sir Robert Sloper	1729	1802	
3 May 1796	Staats Long Morris	1728	1800	
3 May 1796	Ralph Gore, 1st Earl of Ross	1725	1802	
3 May 1796	Sir John Dalling, 1st Baronet	1731	1798	
3 May 1796	Russell Manners	1736	1800	
3 May 1796	Thomas Hall	unknown	1809	
3 May 1796	James Grant	1720	1806	
3 May 1796	Sir William Fawcett	1727	1804	
3 May 1796	William Kerr, 5th Marquess of Lothian	1737	1815	
3 May 1796	Charles Grey, 1st Earl Grey	1729	1807	
3 May 1796	Sir Thomas Spencer Wilson	1727	1798	
3 May 1796	George Morrison	1703	1799	
3 May 1796	Thomas Clarke	unknown	1799	
3 May 1796	Charles Rainsford	1728	1809	
14 May 1796	Sir Robert Pigot, 2nd Baronet	1720	1796	
26 January 1797	Edward Mathew	1729	1805	
26 January 1797	James Pattison	1723	1805	
26 January 1797	The Honourable Henry St John	1738	1818	
26 January 1797	John Campbell	unknown	1807	
26 January 1797	Sir George Osborn, 4th Baronet	1742	1818	
1 January 1798	Sir Thomas Shirley, 1st Baronet	1727	1800	
1 January 1798	Patrick Tonyn	1725	1804	
1 January 1798	Gabriel Christie	1722	1799	
1 January 1798	John Reid	1721	1807	
1 January 1798	Sir William Green	1725	1811	
1 January 1798	George Scott	unknown	1811	
1 January 1798	Charles O'Hara	1740	1802	
1 January 1798	Loftus Anthony Tottenham	unknown	1810	
1 January 1798	William Rowley	unknown	1807	
1 January 1798	Peter Bathurst	1723		
1 January 1798	William Gordon	1736	1815	
1 January 1798	Robert Prescott	c. 1726	1815	
1 January 1798	William Harcourt, 3rd Earl Harcourt	1743	1830	Promoted to field marshal on 19 July 1821.
1 January 1798	Henry Luttrell, 2nd Earl of Carhampton	1743	1821	
1 January 1798	William Dalrymple	1736	1807	
1 January 1798	William Picton	c. 1728	1811	
1 January 1798	Sir Hector Munro	1726	1805	
1 January 1798	The Honourable William Hervey	1732	1815	
1 January 1798	J Fletcher Campbell	1727	1806	
1 January 1798	Francis Lascelles	1744	1799	
1 January 1798	Sir William Medows	1738	1813	
10 May 1799	Prince Edward Augustus, Duke of Kent and Strathearn	1767	1820	Promoted to field marshal in 1805.

== 1801–1821 ==
Promoted	Name	Born	Died	Notes
1 January 1801	Edward Smith	unknown	1808	
1 January 1801	Thomas Bland	unknown	1816	
1 January 1801	Felix Buckley	1724	1823	
1 January 1801	George Ainslie	unknown	1804	
1 January 1801	Benjamin Gordon	unknown	1803	
1 January 1801	James Adeane	1740	1802	
1 January 1801	Henry Watson Powell	1733	1814	
1 January 1801	Sir Thomas Stirling	1733	1808	
1 January 1801	George Garth	1733	1819	
1 January 1801	Richard Grenville	1742	1823	
29 April 1802 (Note: Promotion gazetted on 11 May 1802.)	John Leland	unknown	1808	
29 April 1802	James Inglis Hamilton	before 1742	1803	
29 April 1802	John Stratton	unknown	1803	
29 April 1802	James Rooke	1742	1805	
29 April 1802	Charles Crosbie	unknown	1807	
29 April 1802	John Howard, 15th Earl of Suffolk	1739	1820	
29 April 1802	Chapple Norton	1746	1818	
29 April 1802	George Hotham	1741	1806	
29 April 1802	Sir David Dundas	1735	1820	
29 April 1802	Sir Robert Abercromby of Airthrey	1740	1827	
29 April 1802	Gerard Lake, 1st Viscount Lake	1744	1808	
29 April 1802	Sir Thomas Musgrave	1737	1812	
29 April 1802	James Coates	1740	1822	
29 April 1802	Ralph Dundas	unknown	1814	
29 April 1802	Richard Whyte	unknown	1807	
29 April 1802	Sir Alured Clarke	1744	1832	Promoted to field marshal on 22 July 1830.
25 September 1803	William Shirreff	unknown	1804	
25 September 1803	Sir Samuel Hulse	1746	1837	Promoted to field marshal on 22 July 1830.
25 September 1803	Albemarle Bertie	1744	1818	Earl of Lindsey from 1809.
25 September 1803	Charles Vallancey	1731	1812	
25 September 1803	John de Burgh, 13th Earl of Clanricarde	1744	1808	
25 September 1803	Sir James Steuart Denham	1744	1839	
25 September 1803	Thomas Carleton	c. 1735	1817	
25 September 1803	James Marsh	unknown	1804	
25 September 1803	William Grinfield	c. 1743	1803	Died on 9 November 1803 of yellow fever.
25 September 1803	Cavendish Lister	unknown	1823	
25 September 1803	Charles Leigh	unknown	1815	
25 September 1803	James Ogilvie	c. 1740	1813	
25 September 1803	Sir Robert Laurie	c. 1738	1804	
25 September 1803	William Edmeston	unknown	1804	
25 September 1803	David Home	1732	1809	
25 September 1803	Hugh Debbeig	c. 1728	1808	
25 September 1803	Montgomery Agnew	c. 1735	1813	
25 September 1803	Alexander Lindsay, 6th Earl of Balcarres	1752	1825	
25 September 1803	Cornelius Cuyler	1741	1819	Sir Cornelius Cuyler from 1814 when created a baronet.
25 September 1803	Charles Stanhope, 3rd Earl of Harrington	1753	1829	
25 September 1803	The Honorable Richard FitzPatrick	1748	1813	
25 September 1803	Nisbet Balfour	1743	1823	
25 September 1803	Edmund Stevens	unknown	1825	
25 September 1803	Sir Thomas Trigge	c. 1742	1814	
25 September 1803	Francis Rawdon-Hastings, 2nd Earl of Moira	1754	1826	Marquess of Hastings from 1816.
25 September 1803	Peter Craig	unknown	1810	
25 September 1803	Prince Ernest Augustus, Duke of Cumberland and Teviotdale	1771	1851	Promoted to field marshal in 1813; became King of Hanover in 1837.
25 September 1803	Prince Adolphus Frederick, Duke of Cambridge	1774	1850	Promoted to field marshal in 1813.
25 April 1808	Edmund Fanning	1739	1818	
25 April 1808	Henry Johnson	1748	1835	Created baronet on 1 December 1818.
25 April 1808	The Hon. Henry Fox	1755	1811	
25 April 1808	John Watson	1748	1826	
25 April 1808	Lowther Pennington	1745	1818	Later Baron Muncaster.
25 April 1808	Francis Edward Gwyn	1748	1821	
25 April 1808	Robert Morse	c. 1743	1818	
25 April 1808	Francis Augustus Eliott, 2nd Baron Heathfield	1750	1813	
25 April 1808	Thomas Slaughter Stanwix	unknown	1815	
25 April 1808	Sir James Pulteney	c. 1755	1811	
25 April 1808	Prince William Frederick, Duke of Gloucester and Edinburgh	1776	1834	Promoted to field marshal in 1816.
25 October 1809	James Balfour	1743	1823	
25 October 1809	Robert Donkin	1727	1821	
25 October 1809	Sir James Duff	1752	1839	
25 October 1809	Henry Phipps, 3rd Baron Mulgrave	1755	1831	Created Earl of Mulgrave in 1812.
25 October 1809	Grice Blakeney	1741	1816	
31 July 1811	Arthur Wellesley, 1st Marquess of Wellington	1769	1852	Local rank in Spain and Portugal. Promoted field marshal in 1813. Later Duke of Wellington.
1 January 1812	Sir Paulus Irving	1751	1828	
1 January 1812	Sir George Harris	1746	1829	Later created Baron Harris.
1 January 1812	Richard Vyse	1746	1825	
1 January 1812	William Cathcart, 1st Viscount Cathcart	1755	1843	Later created Earl Cathcart.
1 January 1812	Sir Banastre Tarleton	1754	1833	
1 January 1812	Sir Hew Dalrymple	1750	1830	
1 January 1812	Gordon Forbes	1738	1828	
1 January 1812	Sir John Floyd	1748	1818	
1 January 1812	Oliver De Lancey	c. 1749	1822	
1 January 1812	Sir James Craig	1748	1812	Died 11 days after being promoted.
1 January 1812	Anthony Farrington	1742	1823	Created a baronet in 1818.
1 January 1812	James Stuart	1741	1815	
1 January 1812	John White	unknown	unknown	
1 January 1812	Andrew Drummond	1758	1814	Recognized as de jure 7th Viscount Strathallan after his death.
1 January 1812	John Egerton, 7th Earl of Bridgewater	1753	1823	
1 January 1812	Ellis Walker	unknown	unknown	
1 January 1812	Sir William Maxwell	1754	1837	
1 January 1812	George Herbert, 11th Earl of Pembroke	1759	1827	
1 January 1812	John Pitt, 2nd Earl of Chatham	1756	1835	
1 January 1812	Alexander Campbell	1751	1832	
1 January 1812	William Morshead	1748	1822	
1 January 1812	Francis Dundas	c. 1759	1824	
1 January 1812	Alexander Ross	1742	1827	
1 January 1812	The Hon Francis Needham	1748	1832	Viscount Kilmorey from 1818, Earl of Kilmorey from 1822.
1 January 1812	Sir Henry Pigot	1750	1840	
4 June 1813	George Bernard	unknown	1820	
4 June 1813	Sir George Nugent	1757	1849	Promoted to field marshal in 1846.
4 June 1813	John Barclay	1741	1823	Royal Marines officer holding rank in the Army.
4 June 1813	William Macarmick	c. 1742	1815	
4 June 1813	Robert Stuart	1744	1834	
4 June 1813	Sir William Keppel	1752	1834	
4 June 1813	John Hely-Hutchinson, Baron Hutchinson	1757	1832	Viscount Hutchinson and Earl of Donoughmore from 1825.
4 June 1813	John Hamilton	unknown	1835	
4 June 1813	Alexander Leith Hay	1758	1838	
4 June 1813	James Stewart	unknown	1815	Not to be confused with General James Stuart, promoted to full general in 1812 and died 1815.
4 June 1813	Sir Charles Hastings	1752	1823	
4 June 1813	Robert Manners	1758	1823	
4 June 1813	William Loftus	1752	1831	
4 June 1813	Oliver Nicolls	c. 1740	1829	
4 June 1813	Alexander Mercer	unknown	1816	
4 June 1813	Sir George Hewett	1750	1840	
4 June 1814	Philip Martin	unknown	1821	
4 June 1814	Sir Eyre Coote	1762	1823	Governor of Jamaica from 1806 to 1808. Stripped of his rank and title in 1816 for conduct unbecoming an officer and a gentleman
4 June 1814	Charles Lennox, 4th Duke of Richmond	1764	1819	
4 June 1814	John Adolphus Harris	c. 1745	1827	
4 June 1814	William John Arabin	1750	1828	
4 June 1814	Sir George Don	1756	1832	
4 June 1814	Sir John Cradock	1759	1839	Created Baron Howden in 1819.
4 June 1814	Lord Charles FitzRoy	1764	1829	
4 June 1814	Napier Christie Burton	1758	1835	
4 June 1814	Richard Rich Wilford	c. 1754	1822	
4 June 1814	Edward Morrison	c. 1759	1843	
4 June 1814	Sir Charles Asgill, 2nd Baronet	1762	1823	
4 June 1814	Thomas Garth	1744	1829	
4 June 1814	Vaughan Lloyd	c. 1738	1817	
4 June 1814	James St Clair-Erskine, 2nd Earl of Rosslyn	1762	1837	
4 June 1814	Andrew Cowell	c. 1762	1821	
4 June 1814	Joseph Dussaux	c. 1748	1823	
4 June 1814	Colin Mackenzie	c. 1735	1815	
4 June 1814	John Dickson	c. 1740	1816	
4 June 1814	John Money	c. 1730	1817	
4 June 1814	Sir George Beckwith	1753	1823	
4 June 1814	Thomas Murray	unknown	1816	
4 June 1814	Thomas Roberts	c. 1750	1824	
4 June 1814	George Ludlow, 3rd Earl Ludlow	1758	1842	
4 June 1814	Richard Lambart, 7th Earl of Cavan	1763	1837	
4 June 1814	Sir David Baird, 1st Baronet	1757	1829	
4 June 1814	Frederick St John	1765	1844	
4 June 1814	Lord Charles Somerset	1767	1831	
4 June 1814	John Despard	1745	1829	
4 June 1814	William Wemyss	1760	1822	
25 July 1814	His Royal Highness The Hereditary Prince of Orange	1792	1849	Promoted to field marshal on 28 July 1845.
2 May 1816	Prince Leopold of Saxe-Coburg	1790	1865	Son-in-law of George, the Prince Regent. Promoted to field marshal later in 1816; elected King of the Belgians in 1831.
12 August 1819	The Honourable Robert Taylor	1760	1839	
12 August 1819	George Milner	1760	1836	
12 August 1819	George Gordon, styled Marquess of Huntly	1770	1836	Became Duke of Gordon in 1827.
12 August 1819	The Honorable Edward Finch	1756	1843	
12 August 1819	Isaac Gascoyne	1763	1841	
12 August 1819	David Douglas Wemyss	1760	1839	
12 August 1819	John Cumming	1759	1824	
12 August 1819	Henry Wynyard	1761	1838	
12 August 1819	Duncan Campbell	1763	1837	
12 August 1819	Thomas Grosvenor	1764	1851	Promoted to field marshal on 9 November 1846.
12 August 1819	John Calcraft	unknown	1829	
12 August 1819	John Hope, 4th Earl of Hopetoun	1765	1823	
12 August 1819	James Forbes, 17th Lord Forbes	1765	1843	
12 August 1819	Henry Paget, 1st Marquess of Anglesey	1768	1854	Promoted to field marshal in 1846.
12 August 1819	Sir John Doyle	1756	1834	
12 August 1819	Sir Robert Brownrigg	1759	1833	
12 August 1819	William Knollys	c. 1763	1834	
12 August 1819	The Honorable Edmund Phipps	1760	1837	
12 August 1819	William Cartwright	c. 1754	1827	
12 August 1819	Ferdinand von Hompesch	1766	1831	Count Hompesch
12 August 1819	Sir Baldwin Leighton	1747	1828	
12 August 1819	John Coffin	c. 1751	1838	
12 August 1819	John Murray	c. 1739	1824	
12 August 1819	Sir Charles Green	c. 1751	1831	
12 August 1819	Thomas Hartcup	unknown	1820	
19 July 1821	Sir Thomas Blomefield	1744	1822	
19 July 1821	Gother Mann	c. 1746	1830	
19 July 1821	John Pratt	unknown	1825	
19 July 1821	Sir Josiah Champagné	1775	1840	
19 July 1821	Sir Harry Calvert	1763	1826	
19 July 1821	Sir George Cockburn	1763	1847	
19 July 1821	Edward Dunne	c. 1762	1844	
19 July 1821	James Drummond	c. 1758	1831	
19 July 1821	William Dowdeswell	1760	1828	
19 July 1821	Sir Alexander Mackenzie	c. 1771	1853	
19 July 1821	George Moncrieff	ca.1760	1830	
19 July 1821	Thomas Meyrick	unknown	1830	
19 July 1821	Thomas Graham, 1st Baron Lynedoch	1748	1843	
19 July 1821	George Henry Vansittart	1768	1824	
19 July 1821	Charles FitzRoy	1762	1831	
19 July 1821	Francis Hugonin	1750	1836	

== 1825–1849 ==
Promoted	Name	Born	Died	Notes
27 May 1825	William Scott	unknown	1836	
27 May 1825	Francis Fuller	1763	1841	
27 May 1825	Sir James Affleck	1759	1833	
27 May 1825	George Vaughan Hart	1752	1832	
27 May 1825	George Warde	1760	1830	
27 May 1825	Mervyn Archdall	1763	1839	
27 May 1825	Sir John Coape Sherbrooke	1764	1830	
27 May 1825	Sir Gordon Drummond	1772	1854	
27 May 1825	James Wharton	unknown	1841	
27 May 1825	Sir William Payne	1759	1831	Later Sir William Payne-Gallwey
27 May 1825	The Honourable Edward Bligh	1769	1840	
27 May 1825	Lord William Bentinck	1774	1839	
27 May 1825	Edmund Boyle, 8th Earl of Cork	1767	1856	
27 May 1825	The Honorable Henry Grey	1766	1845	
27 May 1825	Sir Edward Paget	1775	1849	
27 May 1825	Sir Brent Spencer	1760	1828	
27 May 1825	Stapleton Cotton, 1st Baron Combermere	1773	1865	Viscount Combermere from 1827. Promoted to field marshal on 2 October 1855.
27 May 1825	Samuel Dalrymple	1760	1832	
27 May 1825	The Honorable William Stapleton	unknown	1826	
27 May 1825	Denzil Onslow	1770	1838	
27 May 1825	Sir John Murray	c. 1768	1827	
27 May 1825	William Twiss	1745	1827	
27 May 1825	The Honorable Charles Hope	1768	1828	
27 May 1825	Sir George Pigot	1766	1841	
27 May 1825	Rowland Hill, 1st Viscount Hill	1772	1842	
27 May 1825	Frederick Maitland	1763	1848	
27 May 1825	Sir Martin Hunter	1757	1846	
27 May 1825	William Beresford, 1st Viscount Beresford	1768	1856	
22 June 1830	George Ramsay, 9th Earl of Dalhousie	1770	1838	
22 June 1830	Thomas Baker	unknown	1849	
22 June 1830	Henry Williams	c. 1765	1845	
22 June 1830	Henry Conyngham, 1st Marquess Conyngham	1766	1832	
22 June 1830	The Honorable Sir Alexander Hope	1769	1837	
22 June 1830	Sir John Fraser	1760	1843	
22 June 1830	Peter Heron	1770	1848	
22 June 1830	John Ramsay	1768	1845	
22 June 1830	Sir John Broughton	1769	1847	
22 June 1830	William Dyott	1761	1847	
22 June 1830	Sir Ronald Ferguson	1773	1841	
22 June 1830	Sir Robert MacFarlane	1771	1843	
22 June 1830	Sir John Gustavus Crosbie	unknown	1843	
22 June 1830	Edward Stack	1750	1843	
22 June 1830	The Honorable John Brodrick	1765	1842	
22 June 1830	Sir Henry Warde	1766	1834	
22 June 1830	James Durham	1754	1840	
22 June 1830	The Honorable David Leslie	c. 1754	1838	
22 June 1830	John Manners Ker	1767	1843	
22 June 1830	Thomas Scott	1745	1842	
22 June 1830	Sir Hilgrove Turner	1764	1843	
22 June 1830	Christopher Chowne	1771	1834	
22 June 1830	The Honorable William Maitland	1764	1841	
22 June 1830	John Crewe, 2nd Baron Crewe	1772	1835	
22 June 1830	The Honorable Sir Galbraith Lowry Cole	1772	1842	
22 June 1830	Quin John Freeman	1750	1834	
22 June 1830	George Forbes, 6th Earl of Granard	1760	1837	
22 June 1830	Francis Moore	1768	1861	
22 June 1830	Robert King, 1st Viscount Lorton	1773	1854	
22 June 1830	Sir William Clinton	1769	1846	
7 June 1831	Sir Edward Barnes	1776	1838	Local rank in the East Indies.
10 January 1837	Sir Francis Hammond	unknown	1850	
10 January 1837	Robert Dudley Blake	unknown	1850	
10 January 1837	The Honorable Robert Meade	1772	1852	
10 January 1837	Sir William Houstoun, 1st Baronet	1766	1842	
10 January 1837	George Michell	c. 1757	1846	
10 January 1837	Sir Thomas Hislop, 1st Baronet	1764	1843	
10 January 1837	Thomas Bruce, 7th Earl of Elgin	1766	1841	
10 January 1837	David Hunter	unknown	1846	
10 January 1837	Sir John Slade, 1st Baronet	1762	1859	
10 January 1837	Sir Frederick Augustus Wetherall	1754	1842	
10 January 1837	John Daniell Arabin	unknown	1838	
10 January 1837	Sir William Lumley	1769	1850	
10 January 1837	Sir Moore Disney	1766	1846	
10 January 1837	John Mackenzie	c. 1764	1860	
10 January 1837	Alexander Graham Stirling	unknown	1849	
10 January 1837	John Michel	1765	1844	
10 January 1837	Sir William Wilkinson	unknown	1840	
10 January 1837	Sir Henry Tucker Montresor	1767	1837	
10 January 1837	John Hodgson	1757	1846	
10 January 1837	Richard Thomas Nelson	unknown	1842	
10 January 1837	Sir James Hay	unknown	1837	
10 January 1837	James Robertson	c. 1762	1845	
10 January 1837	Edward William Leybourne Popham	1764	1843	
10 January 1837	Sir Fitzroy Jeffreys Grafton Maclean, 8th Baronet	c. 1770	1847	
10 January 1837	Sir Henry Frederick Campbell	1769	1856	
10 January 1837	William Burnet	unknown	1839	
10 January 1837	Charles William Vane, 3rd Marquess of Londonderry	1778	1854	
10 January 1837	Sir John Smith	1754	1837	
10 January 1837	Lewis Bayly Wallis	1775	1848	
10 January 1837	John Sulivan Wood	1766	1851	
10 January 1837	Sir Charles Colville	1770	1843	
10 January 1837	Frederick Charles White	unknown	1859	
10 January 1837	Gore Browne	unknown	1843	
10 January 1837	Sir Henry Fane	1778	1840	
10 January 1837	Sir George Anson	1769	1849	
10 January 1837	Kenneth Howard, 1st Earl of Effingham	1767	1845	
10 January 1837	Thomas Knightly Charleton	unknown	1849	
10 January 1837	William Thomas Dilkes	unknown	1841	
10 January 1837	Sir John Oswald	1771	1840	
10 January 1837	Pinson Bonham	1762	1855	
10 January 1837	Sir William Anson, 1st Baronet	1772	1847	
10 January 1837	Charles Terrot	unknown	1839	
10 January 1837	William Kinsey	c. 1752	1837	Local rank in East Indies.
10 January 1837	Robert Phillips			local rank in East Indies
10 January 1837	Sir Robert Blair	1755	1837	Local rank in East Indies.
10 January 1837	Robert Bell			local rank in East Indies
28 June 1838	John Mackclean			Royal Engineers
28 June 1838	Sir Thomas Saumarez	1760	1845	
28 June 1838	Campbell Callendar	c. 1757	1845	
28 June 1838	Robert Hill Farmar	1775	1839	
28 June 1838	John Stratford Saunders	unknown	1846	
28 June 1838	George Wilson	c. 1748	1841	Royal Artillery
28 June 1838	Sir Warren Marmaduke Peacocke	c. 1765	1849	
28 June 1838	John Pare	unknown	1839	
28 June 1838	Charles Wale	1765	1845	
28 June 1838	Sir John Vandeleur	1763	1849	
28 June 1838	Charles Pye Douglas	1767	1844	
28 June 1838	Robert Browne-Clayton	c. 1770	1845	
28 June 1838	Alexander John Goldie	c. 1774	1848	
28 June 1838	Sir Roger Sheaffe	1763	1851	
28 June 1838	The Honorable Sir Alexander Duff	1777	1851	
28 June 1838	Sir Rufane Donkin	1772	1841	
28 June 1838	William Hassall Eden	c. 1768	1851	
28 June 1838	Sir George Walker	1764	1842	
28 June 1838	Sir John Dalrymple	1771	1853	Earl of Stair from 1840.
28 June 1838	Samuel Hawker	1763	1838	
28 June 1838	Bennet Marley	1753	1842	Local rank in East Indies
28 June 1838	Samuel Bradshaw	c. 1759	1840	Local rank in East Indies
28 June 1838	Sir Hector M'Lean			Local rank in East Indies
23 November 1841	Sir George Murray	1772	1846	
23 November 1841	Sir James Kempt	1765	1854	
23 November 1841	Sir Evan Lloyd	unknown	1846	
23 November 1841	Matthew Sharpe	1773	1845	
23 November 1841	Richard Blunt	1770	1859	
23 November 1841	Sir Henry Bayly	unknown	1846	
23 November 1841	Francis Rebow	1770	1845	
23 November 1841	Gerard Gosselin	1769	1859	
23 November 1841	Sir Frederick Robinson	1763	1852	
23 November 1841	Sir Arthur Dillon	c. 1772	1845	
23 November 1841	Duncan Darroch	c. 1776	1847	
23 November 1841	Sir Phineas Riall	1775	1850	
23 November 1841	William Brooke	c. 1770	1843	
23 November 1841	Sir Thomas Molyneux	1767	1841	Died 26 November 1841, three days after his promotion.
23 November 1841	John Vincent	1764	1848	
23 November 1841	Joseph Walker	unknown	1848	
23 November 1841	Sir William Hutchinson	unknown	1845	
23 November 1841	John Byng, 1st Baron Strafford	1772	1860	Created Earl of Strafford in 1847. Promoted to field marshal on 2 October 1855.
23 November 1841	Sir Thomas Brisbane	1773	1860	
23 November 1841	Sir Alexander Halkett	1773	1851	
23 November 1841	Sir William Grant	1772	1852	
23 November 1841	Lord Edward Somerset	1776	1842	
23 November 1841	The Honorable Arthur Grove Annesley	1774	1849	
23 November 1841	Boyle Travers	c. 1772	1853	
23 November 1841	Sir Thomas Bradford	1777	1853	
23 November 1841	John Granby Clay	1766	1846	
23 November 1841	Gage John Hall	unknown	1854	
23 November 1841	The Honorable William de Blaquiere	1778	1851	Baron de Blaquiere from 1844.
23 November 1841	Sir Thomas Browne	c. 1771	1843	
23 November 1841	Sir John Lambert	1772	1847	
23 November 1841	Sir J Willoughby Gordon	1772	1851	
23 November 1841	Sir Thomas Montresor	1774	1853	
23 November 1841	Sir Ralph Darling	1772	1858	Joined the Army as a private soldier.
28 November 1841	Sir Robert Wilson	1777	1849	
23 November 1841	Matthew Whitworth-Aylmer, 5th Baron Aylmer	1775	1850	
23 November 1841	Alexander Cuppage		1847	local rank in East Indies
23 November 1841	Charles Rumley	1764	1845	local rank in East Indies
23 November 1841	Tredway Clarke	1764	1858	local rank in East Indies
9 November 1846	Sir Charles Imhoff	1767	1853	
9 November 1846	Gabriel Gordon	1763	1855	
9 November 1846	Charles Craven	1769	1850	
9 November 1846	James Orde	unknown	1850	
9 November 1846	Sir Charles Egerton	1774	1857	
9 November 1846	Sir Henry Cumming	1772	1856	
9 November 1846	Thomas Birch Reynardson	1773	1847	
9 November 1846	John Proby, 2nd Earl of Carysfort	1780	1855	
9 November 1846	Sir Peregrine Maitland	1777	1854	
9 November 1846	Thomas Edward Capel	1770	1855	
9 November 1846	Godfrey Basil Mundy	c. 1780	1848	
9 November 1846	Sir Colin Halkett	1774	1856	
9 November 1846	The Right Honorable Sir Frederick Adam	1781	1853	
6 March 1849	Sir Charles Napier	1782	1853	Granted the local rank of general in the Army in the East Indies.

== 1851–1869 ==
Promoted	Name	Born	Died	Notes
11 November 1851	Sir Lewis Grant	1778	1852	
11 November 1851	Peter Carey	1774	1852	
11 November 1851	Sir John Wallace	1775	1857	
11 November 1851	Hastings Fraser	c. 1771	1852	
11 November 1851	Sir George Adams	1779	1856	
11 November 1851	Sir Loftus Otway	1775	1854	
11 November 1851	Sir Edward Kerrison	1776	1853	
11 November 1851	Sir Robert Barton	1770	1853	
11 November 1851	Sir John Guise	1777	1865	
11 November 1851	Paul Anderson	1767	1851	
11 November 1851	Sir Andrew Barnard	1773	1855	
11 November 1851	Richard Pigot	1774	1868	
11 November 1851	Sir James Watson	1772	1862	
11 November 1851	Sir Augustus De Butts	1766	1853	
11 November 1851	Sir Richard Bourke	1777	1855	
11 November 1851	The Honorable Sir Patrick Stuart	1777	1855	
11 November 1851	Henry Trevor, 21st Baron Dacre	1777	1853	
11 November 1851	Sir Howard Douglas	1776	1861	
11 November 1851	The Honorable Arthur Upton	1777	1855	
11 November 1851	Samuel Huskisson	c. 1774	1854	
11 November 1851	Henry Monckton	1780	1854	
11 November 1851	John Maister	1778	1852	
20 June 1854 (Note: The 1890 edition of Haydn's Book of Dignities gives the promotion date as 11 November 1851, which is at variance with the contemporaneous London Gazette reference.)	Samuel Brown	unknown	1855	
20 June 1854	Dennis Herbert	c. 1771	1861	
20 June 1854	John Bruce Richard O'Neill, 3rd Viscount O'Neill	1780	1855	
20 June 1854	Alexander Armstrong		1861	
20 June 1854	Sir Edward Blakeney	1778	1868	Blakeney was promoted to field marshal on 9 November 1862.
20 June 1854	Sir Thomas Hawker	1777	1858	
20 June 1854	Sir John Wilson	1780	1856	
20 June 1854	John Colborne, 1st Baron Seaton	1778	1863	
20 June 1854	Sir Thomas McMahon	1779	1860	
20 June 1854	Sir Alexander Woodford	1782	1870	Woodford was promoted to field marshal on 1 January 1868.
20 June 1854	John Fane, 11th Earl of Westmorland	1784	1859	
20 June 1854	FitzRoy Somerset, 1st Baron Raglan	1788	1855	Temporary promotion 21 February 1854; substantive 20 June 1854. Master-General of the Ordnance from 1852 Raglan was promoted to field marshal on 5 November 1854.
20 June 1854	Lord Charles Manners	1780	1855	
20 June 1854	Robert Ellice	1784	1856	
20 June 1854	Cosmo Gordon	c. 1777	1867	
20 June 1854	Hugh Gough, 1st Viscount Gough	1779	1869	Promoted to field marshal on 9 November 1862.
20 June 1854	Sir James Macdonell	1781	1857	
20 June 1854	James Wallace Sleigh	1775	1865	
20 June 1854	Sir William Davy	1780	1856	
20 June 1854	Jonathan Yates	1780	1854	
20 June 1854	Sir John FitzGerald	c. 1785	1877	Promoted to field marshal on 29 May 1875.
20 June 1854	Sir Arthur Clifton	1771	1869	
20 June 1854	William Eustace	1783	1855	
20 June 1854	Charles Cathcart, 2nd Earl Cathcart	1783	1859	
20 June 1854	Sir Alexander Leith	1774	1859	
20 June 1854	Sir John Brown	c. 1776	1856	
20 June 1854	Sir Hugh Arbuthnot	1780	1868	
20 June 1854	James Dawes Douglas	1785	1862	
20 June 1854	Sir William MacBean	c. 1782	1855	
20 June 1854	Henry Hardinge, 1st Viscount Hardinge	1785	1856	Promoted to field marshal on 2 October 1855.
20 June 1854	Sir Willoughby Cotton	1783	1860	
20 June 1854	Sir John Hanbury	1782	1863	
20 June 1854	Henry Lygon, 4th Earl Beauchamp	1784	1863	
20 June 1854	Edward Pyndar Lygon	1786	1860	
20 June 1854	Sir George Whitmore	1775	1862	
20 June 1854	Henry Shadforth	c. 1779	1866	
20 June 1854	John Millet Hamerton	1778	1855	
20 June 1854	Sir William Tuyll	unknown	1864	
20 June 1854	Sir George Berkeley	1785	1857	
20 June 1854	Sackville Hamilton Berkeley	1780	1863	
20 June 1854	Helier Touzel	c. 1779	1865	
20 June 1854	Sir Henry King	c. 1777	1854	
20 June 1854	Sir George Napier	1784	1855	
20 June 1854	Sir George Scovell	1774	1861	
20 June 1854	Ulysses Burgh, 2nd Baron Downes	1788	1864	
20 June 1854	George Hay, 8th Marquess of Tweeddale	1787	1876	Promoted to field marshal on 29 May 1875.
20 June 1854	Sir Frederick Trench	1775	1859	
20 June 1854	Sir Henry Wyndham	1790	1860	
20 June 1854	Frederick Rennell Thackeray	1775	1860	
20 June 1854	John Francis Birch	c. 1778	1856	
20 June 1854	Gustavus Nicolls	1779	1860	
20 June 1854	Henry Evelegh	c. 1773	1859	
20 June 1854	The Honorable William Henry Gardner	1774	1856	
20 June 1854	George Wright	c. 1777	1857	
20 June 1854	Frederick Walker	unknown	1857	
20 June 1854	Sir Edward Bowater	1787	1861	
20 June 1854	Joseph Webbe Tobin	1776	1863	
20 June 1854	Sir William Gomm	1784	1875	Promoted to field marshal on 1 January 1868.
20 June 1854	Hugh Stacey Osborne		1855	Rank held in the East Indies.
20 June 1854	James Lillyman Caldwell	1770	1863	Rank held in the East Indies.
20 June 1854	George Carpenter	c. 1765	1855	Rank held in the East Indies.
20 June 1854	Sir David Leighton	1774	1860	Rank held in the East Indies.
20 June 1854	James Welsh	1775	1861	Rank held in the East Indies. Madras Army
20 June 1854	Sir James Russell	1781	1859	Rank held in the East Indies.
20 June 1854	Martin White	c. 1768	1856	Rank held in the East Indies.
20 June 1854	Richard Podmore	c. 1780	1870	Rank held in the East Indies.
20 June 1854	Sir Robert Houston	1780	1862	Rank held in the East Indies.
20 June 1854	John Greenstreet	1781	1856	Rank held in the East Indies.
20 June 1854	George Rees Kemp	1780	1861	Rank held in the East Indies.
20 June 1854	John Munro	1778	1858	Rank held in the East Indies.
20 June 1854	John Alexander Paul Macgregor	1780	1868	Rank held in the East Indies. Bengal Army
20 June 1854	Sir Jeffery Prendergast	1769	1856	Rank held in the East Indies.
20 June 1854	Sir William Richards	c. 1779	1861	Rank held in the East Indies.
20 June 1854	Alexander Duncan	1780	1859	Rank held in the East Indies.
20 June 1854	Robert James Latter	1783	1855	Rank held in the East Indies.
20 June 1854	Jerry Francis Dyson	1779	1861	Rank held in the East Indies.
20 June 1854	Sir John Doveton	1783	1857	Rank held in the East Indies. Madras Army
20 June 1854	Alexander Fair	c. 1775	1861	Rank held in the East Indies.
20 June 1854	Sir James Lushington	1779	1859	Rank held in the East Indies.
20 June 1854	William Charles Fraser	unknown	1859	Rank held in the East Indies.
20 June 1854	William Gilbert	unknown	1867	Rank held in the East Indies.
28 November 1854	Sir Hew Ross	1779	1868	Promoted to field marshal on 1 January 1868.
28 November 1854	Sir Robert Gardiner	1781	1864	
30 January 1855	Henry D'Oyly	c. 1780	1855	
16 February 1855	The Honorable Henry Murray	1784	1860	
20 February 1855	Sir John Grey	1780 (?)	1856	
16 March 1855	Augustus Andrews	c. 1780	1858	Rank held in the East Indies.
18 May 1855	Thomas Evans	1776	1863	
5 June 1855	Sir Archibald Maclaine	c. 1772	1861	
31 August 1855	Sir William Wood	c. 1782	1870	
5 September 1855	Sir John Burgoyne	1782	1871	Promoted to field marshal on 1 January 1868.
7 September 1855	Sir George Brown	1790	1865	Brevet promotion to general on 7 September 1855. On 4 April 1856 Brown was granted a regular promotion to general, backdated to 7 September 1855. Haydn's Book of Dignities gives Brown's promotion date as 7 September 1856.
8 September 1855	Sir James Simpson	1792	1868	
15 September 1855	James Ahmuty	unknown	1861	Held rank by brevet in the East Indies.
28 November 1855	Brackley Kennett	1770	1857	Held rank by brevet in the East Indies. Assassinated during the Indian Mutiny.
20 February 1856	Charles Ashe à Court-Repington	1785	1861	
9 April 1856	Mossem Boyd		1865	
4 July 1856	John M'Innes	unknown	1858	Held rank in the East Indies.
15 July 1856	Prince George, Duke of Cambridge	1819	1904	promoted to field marshal in 1862
18 July 1856	James Fallowfield Salter	unknown	1857	Held rank in the East Indies.
25 September 1856	Thomas Brabazon Aylmer	c. 1783	1858	
16 December 1856	Richard Uniacke	unknown	1867	
16 December 1856	George Irving	c. 1773	1865	
16 December 1856	Richard Secker Brough	c. 1774	1859	
4 February 1857	James Irving	unknown	unknown	
4 February 1857	Sir William Greenshields Power	1781	1863	
23 September 1857	Sir Henry Taylor	c. 1784	1876	Held rank in the East Indies.
26 September 1857	Sir Henry Riddell	unknown	1861	
13 October 1857	Brook Bridges Parlby	c. 1783	1873	Held rank in the East Indies.
13 October 1857	Sir Robert Cunliffe	1785	1859	Held rank in the East Indies.
27 January 1858	John Truscott	1778	1865	
4 March 1858	Edward Showers	c. 1785	1869	Held rank in the East Indies.
14 May 1858	Colin Campbell, 1st Baron Clyde	1792	1863	Local rank in Turkey, 28 December 1855, and in the East Indies, 11 July 1857. Promoted supernumerary general for distinguished service, 14 May 1858, and placed on the fixed establishment of generals, 20 July 1858. Promoted to field marshal, 9 November 1862.
24 October 1858	Patrick Cameron	c. 1784	1871	Held rank in the East Indies.
16 January 1859	Thomas John Forbes	unknown	1868	
5 March 1859	John Carfrae	unknown	1860	Held rank in the East Indies.
13 March 1859	George Jackson	c. 1782	1866	Held rank in the East Indies.
2 April 1859	Henry Vernon	1779	1861	
15 May 1859	George Swiney	1786	1868	Held rank in the East Indies.
17 May 1859	Sir George Pollock, 1st Baronet	1786	1872	Held rank in the East Indies. Promoted to Field Marshal on 24 May 1870.
30 May 1859	Samuel Goodfellow	c. 1774	1860	Held rank in the East Indies.
12 June 1859	Sir James Archibald Hope	1785	1871	
17 July 1859	Sir Robert Harvey	1785	1860	
14 August 1859	Sir Frederick Stovin	1783	1865	
11 September 1859	Sir Alexander Lindsay	1785	1872	Held rank in the East Indies.
25 September 1859	Frederick Campbell	1780	1866	
25 September 1859	Robert Douglas			
17 October 1859	Sir William Napier	1785	1860	
7 December 1859	John Reeve			
26 December 1859	Thomas Kenah	c. 1782	1868	
28 January 1860	Edward Buckley Wynyard	1788	1864	
13 February 1860	Sir James Fergusson	1787	1865	
1 April 1860	Sir Thomas William Brotherton	1785	1868	
11 April 1860	Sir Adolphus Dalrymple	1784	1866	
5 May 1860	Sir James Reynett	1786	1864	
2 June 1860	James Stuart Fraser	1783	1869	Held rank in the East Indies.
15 June 1860	Sir John Bell	1782	1876	
16 June 1860	Peter Delamotte	1782	1861	Held rank in the East Indies. Surname also given as de la Motte.
19 June 1860	Sir Samuel Benjamin Auchmuty	1780	1868	
26 June 1860	Edward Frederick			
30 July 1860	Sir John Aitchison	1779	1875	
3 August 1860	William Jervois	1782	1862	
30 August 1860	George Benjamin Brooks		1862	Held rank in the East Indies.
20 September 1860	Sir Charles William Pasley	1780	1861	FRS
12 November 1860	Sir Francis Cockburn	1780	1868	
18 January 1861	Sir Richard Lluellyn	1781	1867	
25 January 1861	Peter Lodwick			Bombay Infantry. Surname also given as Lodevick.
30 January 1861	Suetonius Henry Todd	1780	1861	Bengal Infantry
6 February 1861	John Briggs	1785	1875	Madras Infantry, FRS
21 February 1861	Harry Thomson	1780	1878	Bengal Cavalry
9 March 1861	Peter Augustus Latour	1788	1866	
10 March 1861	Sir De Lacy Evans	1787	1870	
23 March 1861	William Henry Scott	1789	1868	
20 April 1861	Sir Charles Grene Ellicombe	1783	1871	
20 April 1861	Sir Thomas Willshire, Bt	1789	1862	
24 August 1861	Sir Philip Bainbrigge	1786	1862	
2 September 1861	Charles William Hamilton	1784	1866	Bengal Infantry
17 September 1861	Edmund Frederick Waters	1785	1866	
20 September 1861	Sir Thomas Erskine Napier	1790	1863	
2 November 1861	Richard Collyer Andrée	1785	1865	Bengal Infantry
10 November 1861	William Henry Sewell	c.1786	1862	
15 December 1861	William Lindsay Darling	c. 1788	1863	
7 March 1862	Sir John McDonald	1790	1866	
14 March 1862	Sir George William Paty	1788	1868	
3 April 1862	William Douglas			
3 April 1862	John Oldfield	1789	1863	
6 April 1862	Thomas Shubrick	1781	1863	Bengal Cavalry
1 June 1862	Lord James Hay		1862	
13 August 1862	Sir William Rowan	1789	1879	Promoted to field marshal on 2 June 1877.
19 August 1862	Sir James Shaw Kennedy	1788	1865	
5 October 1862	David Barr	unknown	1862	Died one month and 16 days after promotion. Served in the Bombay Infantry.
6 November 1862	Sir George Leigh Goldie	1791	1863	Name also given as George Lee Goldie.
9 November 1862	George Powell Higginson	1788	1866	
9 November 1862	Sir George Bowles	1787	1876	
9 November 1862	Henry Frederick Compton Cavendish	1789	1873	
9 November 1862	Thomas William Robbins		1864	
9 November 1862	Prince Albert Edward, Prince of Wales	1841	1910	promoted to field marshal in 1875; succeeded as King Edward VII in 1901
22 November 1862	Thomas Henry Paul	1785	1866	Bengal Infantry.
21 December 1862	Roderick Macneil		1863	<! -- Wrongly listed in Haydn's Book of Dignities as promoted on 21 December 1863, two months after his death. -->
6 January 1863	Francis Farquharson	1787	1872	Bombay Infantry.
24 January 1863	Sir George Turner	1780	1864	Royal Artillery
12 February 1863	Sir Charles Gore	1793	1869	
13 February 1863	William Lovelace Walton	1788	1865	
22 February 1863	Peter Margetson Wallace	1780	1864	A result of the death of General Joseph Webbe Tobin, Colonel-Commandant Royal Artillery, on 21 February 1863
6 March 1863	Charles Richard Fox	1796	1873	
6 March 1863	Charles Augustus Shawe	1792	1876	
27 March 1863	Mildmay Fane	1795	1868	
8 June 1863	Sir James Maxwell Wallace	1785	1867	
29 June 1863	Samuel Swinhoe	1787	1866	
6 July 1863	Sir Richard England	1793	1883	Retired 1 October 1877.
27 July 1863	William Codrington	1804	1884	Sir William Codrington from 1865. Retired 1 October 1877.
3 August 1863	Sir John Smith	1790	1874	
9 September 1863	George Petre Wymer	1789	1868	
9 October 1863	William Pattle	1783	1875	
23 October 1863	Henry Vane, 2nd Duke of Cleveland	1788	1864	
23 October 1863	Sir George Wetherall	1788	1868	
13 January 1864	John Anderson	unknown	1866	Bengal Infantry.
27 June 1864	Sir John Michell	1781	1866	Royal Artillery
10 August 1864	Sir Frederick Love	1789	1866	
3 October 1864	Abraham Roberts	1784	1873	Held rank in the East Indies. Sir Abraham Roberts from 1865.
28 October 1864	Sir Duncan MacGregor	1787	1881	Retired 1 October 1877.
25 November 1864	Charles George James Arbuthnot	1801	1870	
10 December 1864	Sir Edward Charles Whinyates	1782	1865	Royal Artillery
15 December 1864	George Cobbe	1782	1865	Royal Artillery
27 December 1864	Alexander Fisher Macintosh	1795	1868	
12 January 1865	William Robert Clayton	1786	1866	
12 January 1865	Beaumont Hotham, 3rd Baron Hotham	1794	1870	
12 January 1865	John Spink	1783	1877	
6 February 1865	Sir James Jackson	1790	1871	
9 February 1865	Cavalié Mercer	1783	1868	
10 February 1865	John Drummond	1790	1875	
9 March 1865	Sir James Freeth	1786	1867	
28 March 1865	Frederick Young	1786	1874	Held rank in the East Indies.
2 April 1865	Sir Charles O'Donnell	1794	1870	
9 April 1865	Sir Thomas Monteath Douglas	1787	1868	Held rank in the East Indies.
31 May 1865	Robert Bartlett Coles	1785	1869	
13 June 1865	William Robert Clayton Costley	1778	1866	Held rank in the East Indies.
17 August 1865	Edward Pery Buckley	1796	1873	
28 August 1865	George Bingham, 3rd Earl of Lucan	1800	1888	Promoted to Field Marshal on 21 June 1887.
5 September 1865	Sir Charles Yorke	1790	1880	Promoted to Field Marshal on 2 June 1877.
26 December 1865	Sir William MacBean George Colebrooke	1787	1870	
12 January 1866	John Henry Richardson	unknown	1867	
12 January 1866	Sir Edward Cust, 1st Baronet	1794	1878	Retired 1 October 1877.
14 January 1866	William Chamberlayne	unknown	1869	
14 January 1866	Francis John Davies	1791	1874	
4 March 1866	Marcus Beresford	1800	1876	
31 March 1866	Sir James Chatterton	1794	1874	
5 April 1866	Sir William Cator	c. 1784	1866	Died 11 May 1866, just over a month after his promotion.
20 April 1866	James St Clair-Erskine, 3rd Earl of Rosslyn	1802	1866	
26 April 1866	Charles Herbert	unknown	1867	Madras Infantry.
3 May 1866	Alexander Dick	1786	1875	Bengal Infantry.
12 May 1866	Henry Alexander Scott	c. 1779	1868	
27 May 1866	John Morgan	c. 1785	1869	Madras Infantry.
12 June 1866	Charles Arthur Grenado Wallington	1785	1867	Bengal Infantry.
17 June 1866	William Thomas Knollys	1797	1883	Retired 1 October 1877.
19 June 1866	Thomas Oliver	1789	1872	Bengal Infantry.
25 June 1866	Henry Robert Ferguson Davie	1797	1885	
23 July 1866	Henry Hall	1789	1874	Bengal Infantry.
24 August 1866	William Wylde	1788	1877	
17 September 1866	Julius George Griffith	1792	1872	
6 November 1866	Charles Butler James	1784	1870	Bombay Infantry. Haydn's Book of Dignities gives a promotion date of 6 December 1866.
18 January 1867	Sir John Low	1788	1880	Held rank in the East Indies.
20 January 1867	Ernest Frederick Gascoigne	1797	1876	
4 February 1867	Hugh Rose, 1st Baron Strathnairn	1801	1885	Promoted to field marshal on 2 June 1877.
8 March 1867	St John Augustus Clerke	1796	1870	
8 December 1867	Sir Henry John William Bentinck	1796	1878	Retired 1 October 1877.
1 January 1868	Sir Thomas Reed	1796	1883	Retired 1 October 1877.
1 January 1868	Henry Dundas, 3rd Viscount Melville	1801	1876	
1 January 1868	Sherburne Williams	1789	1874	
1 January 1868	Robert Sloper Piper	1791	1874	
1 January 1868	William Redman Ord	1792	1872	
1 January 1868	Joseph Darby	c. 1787	1869	
1 January 1868	Francis Rawdon Chesney	1789	1872	
21 January 1868	Patrick Edmonstone Craigie	1794	1873	
2 February 1868	Sir Richard Dacres	1799	1886	Promoted to field marshal on 27 March 1886.
6 March 1868	John Wheeler Cleveland	c. 1792	1883	Madras Infantry.
6 March 1868	Matthew Sappett	unknown	unknown	Bombay Infantry.
6 March 1868	Alexander Tulloch	1788	1878	Madras Infantry.
13 March 1868	Edmund Finucane Morris	1792	1871	
27 March 1868	Henry Colvile	c. 1796	1875	
9 April 1868	Everard William Bouverie	1789	1871	
19 April 1868	The Honorable Thomas Ashburnham	1816	1872	
1 May 1868	Sir John Scott	1797	1873	
9 May 1868	Sir John Pennefather	1798	1872	
12 July 1868	Edward Wells Bell	1789	1870	
12 July 1868	Thomas Perronet Thompson	1783	1869	
2 August 1868	Sir William Williams, 1st Baronet, of Kars	1800	1883	
13 August 1868	David Capon	1793	1869	
25 August 1868	John Eden	1789	1874	
29 August 1868	Sir Charles Grey	1804	1870	
19 October 1868	George Moore	c. 1791	1869	Bombay Infantry.
10 November 1868	William FitzGerald-de Ros, 23rd Baron de Ros	1797	1874	
22 November 1868	Philip Spencer Stanhope	1799	1880	
11 December 1868	Frederick Schuler	unknown	1874	
14 December 1868	George Conran	c. 1793	1869	
8 March 1869	Henry Montagu, 6th Baron Rokeby	1798	1883	
30 March 1869	Henry Lechmere Worrall	1798	1872	Bengal Cavalry.
19 August 1869	Donald Macleod	1796	1870	Madras Cavalry.
23 August 1869	George Warren	c. 1801	1884	Bengal Infantry.
5 September 1869	Henry Edward Porter	unknown	1871	
28 October 1869	William Beckwith	1795	1871	
18 December 1869	Henry William Breton	1799	1889	

== 1870–1881 ==
Promoted	Name	Born	Died	Notes
10 January 1870	Thomas Gerrard Ball	1791	1881	
18 January 1870	Charles Montauban Carmichael	1790	1870	
7 February 1870	Edward Sabine	1788	1883	
7 February 1870	Peter Faddy	1787	1879	
8 February 1870	Thomas Matthew Taylor	c. 1792	1871	Bengal Cavalry.
9 February 1870	Robert Napier, 1st Baron Napier of Magdala	1810	1890	Promoted to the local rank of full general in the East Indies on 9 February 1870. Promoted to the substantive rank of full general on 1 April 1874. Promoted to field marshal in 1883.
22 February 1870	Joseph Garnault	1794	1872	Madras Infantry.
1 April 1870	George Dixon	1802	1874	
24 May 1870	Sir George Brooke	c. 1793	1883	
25 June 1870	Robert Hawkes	c. 1790	1876	Bengal Cavalry.
25 June 1870	James Bell	unknown	1887	Madras Infantry.
25 June 1870	Christopher Dixon Wilkinson	1795	1879	Bengal Infantry.
25 June 1870	James Edwin Williams	1803	1885	Madras Infantry.
25 June 1870	Robert Alexander	c. 1799	1879	Madras Infantry.
25 June 1870	John Kynaston Luard	1803	1880	Madras Infantry.
25 June 1870	Adolphus Derville	1801	1874	Madras Infantry.
25 June 1870	Thomas Littleton Green	1805	1895	Madras Infantry.
25 June 1870	George Tomkyns	unknown	1873	Bengal Infantry.
25 June 1870	William Cavaye	1802	1896	Bombay Infantry.
25 June 1870	Francis Straton	1793	1882	Madras Cavalry.
25 June 1870	Charles Richard William Lane		1872	Bengal Infantry.
25 June 1870	John Whitehead Yaldwyn	1803	1879	Madras Infantry.
25 July 1870	Sir Watkin Williams	c. 1800	1877	Madras Infantry.
9 August 1870	Frederick Maunsell	1793	1875	
10 October 1870	John Hall	1799	1872	
22 October 1870	George Henry Lockwood	1804	1884	
19 November 1870	Sir Patrick Grant	1804	1895	Promoted to field marshal on 24 June 1883.
22 November 1870	Sir Robert Vivian	1802	1887	
24 February 1871	Sir William Wyllie	1802	1891	Haydn's Book of Dignities gives Wyllie's promotion date as 24 February 1870.
9 April 1871	Richard Airey, 1st Baron Airey	1803	1881	
8 June 1871	Thomas Foster	1796	1872	Brevet promotion.
8 June 1871	Crighton Grierson	1790	1871	
8 June 1871	Thomas Coryndon Luxmoore	c. 1796	1879	Haydn's Book of Dignities gives the promotion date as 8 July 1871.
8 June 1871	William Faris	unknown	unknown	Haydn's Book of Dignities gives the promotion date as 8 July 1871.
14 July 1871	Henry Goodwyn	unknown	1886	Bengal Engineers.
3 September 1871	Eyre Evans Bruce	1792	1874	Madras Army.
25 October 1871	Sir James Yorke Scarlett	1799	1871	
25 October 1871	Sir George Buller	1802	1884	
25 October 1871	Sir John Bloomfield Gough	1804	1891	
25 October 1871	Hon. Arthur Upton	1807	1883	
25 October 1871	William Crokat	1791	1879	
25 October 1871	Robert Martin Leake	1782	1873	
25 October 1871	Sir Abraham Josias Cloëté	1794	1886	
25 October 1871	George Macdonald	1784	1883	
25 October 1871	James Robertson Craufurd	1804	1888	
25 October 1871	Richard Greaves	1793	1872	
25 October 1871	Sir William Henry Elliott	1792	1874	
19 November 1871	William Cartwright	1797	1873	
19 November 1871	Pringle Taylor	1796	1884	
5 December 1871	Peter Edwards	c. 1790	1874	Haydn's Book of Dignities gives Edwards's promotion date as 19 November 1871.
5 December 1871	George Whichcote	1794	1891	
5 December 1871	James Arthur Butler	1800	1881	
5 December 1871	Thomas Henry Johnston		1891	
7 December 1871	Henry Aitchison Hankey	1805	1886	
9 December 1871	Henry Chambers Murray Cox	1789	1876	Held rank in the East Indies.
31 December 1871	Henry Dive Townshend	1796	1882	
1 January 1872	Thomas Wood		1872	
21 January 1872	Francis Frankland Whinyates	1797	1887	
31 January 1872	Sir William Bell	1788	1873	
19 February 1872	George Huyshe	c. 1804	1881	Bengal Infantry.
4 March 1872	William Hassall Eden	1800	1882	
21 March 1872	Sir John Campbell	1802	1877	Madras Infantry.
12 April 1872	Montgomery Williams	1796	1872	
23 April 1872	Augustus Clarke	c. 1801	1878	Madras Infantry.
23 April 1872	Sir James Grant	1808	1875	Grant's promotion date was originally gazetted as 6 May 1872 but was amended in accordance with the provisions of the 27th Clause of the Royal Warrant of 27 December 1870.
6 May 1872	Sir John Le Marchant	1803	1874	Le Marchant's promotion date was originally gazetted as 10 May 1872 but was amended in accordance with the provisions of the 27th Clause of the Royal Warrant of 27 December 1870.
16 May 1872	Charles Hamilton	1801	1889	Bengal Infantry.
10 May 1872	Charles Gascoyne	1806	1881	Gascoyne's promotion date was originally gazetted as 23 May 1872 but was amended in accordance with the provisions of the 27th Clause of the Royal Warrant of 27 December 1870.
23 May 1872	William Mansfield, 1st Baron Sandhurst	1819	1876	
19 June 1872	Richard Stotherd	1796	1879	
1 August 1872	Sir James Alexander	unknown	1888	Bengal Artillery.
27 August 1872	Henry Servante	1795	1876	
6 October 1872	John Theophilus Lane	1803	1895	
24 October 1872	Sir Edward Lugard	1810	1898	
9 December 1872	Edward Armstrong	c. 1803	1888	Madras Infantry.
19 January 1873	George Henry MacKinnon	1806	1899	
8 March 1873	Sir Maurice Stack	unknown	1880	Bombay Cavalry.
29 March 1873	Poole England	1787	1884	
29 March 1873	The Honorable William Arbuthnot	unknown	1876	
29 March 1873	Robert Franck Romer	1788	1878	
6 April 1873	George Upton, 3rd Viscount Templetown	1802	1890	
14 April 1873	Arthur Alexander Dalzell, 9th Earl of Carnwath	1799	1875	
26 May 1873	Sir Thomas Pratt	1797	1879	
29 May 1873	William Nelson Hutchinson	1803	1895	
29 August 1873	Walter John Browne	1799	1881	Bombay Infantry.
17 November 1873	Philip Francis Story	c. 1809	1885	Bengal Cavalry.
14 December 1873	Arthur Simcoe Baynes	1797	1875	
29 December 1873	Montague Cholmondley Johnstone	1804	1874	
6 January 1874	William Frederick Forster	1798	1879	
7 January 1874	Frederick Johnstone			
7 February 1874	George Thomas Colomb	1787	1874	
7 February 1874	George Keppel, 6th Earl of Albemarle	1799	1891	
21 March 1874	Francis Nathaniel Conyngham, 2nd Marquess Conyngham	1797	1876	
21 March 1874	Maurice Barlow	1795	1875	
28 March 1874	Sir John Michel	1804	1886	Promoted to field marshal on 27 March 1886.
28 March 1874	Henry Cracklow	c. 1803	1886	Bombay Infantry.
10 April 1874	William Prescott	c. 1801	1876	Madras Infantry.
14 April 1874	Robert Percy Douglas	1804	1891	
16 May 1874	George Alexander Malcolm	1810	1888	
23 May 1874	Henry Lawrence	c. 1790	1887	Bengal Infantry.
8 July 1874	Richard Budd	c. 1795	1885	Madras Infantry.
21 July 1874	George Campbell of Inverneill	1803	1882	Served in the East India Company.
23 September 1874	Henry Eyre	1805	1889	
7 October 1874	Lord William Paulet	1804	1893	Promoted to field marshal on 10 July 1886.
10 October 1874	John Patton	unknown	unknown	Retired 1 October 1877.
21 November 1874	Edward Charles Frome	1802	1890	Retired 1 October 1877.
5 December 1874	Sir Duncan Cameron	1808	1888	
8 March 1875	Sir George Bell	1794	1877	
31 March 1875	Walter Scott	unknown	1876	Bombay Engineers
13 April 1875	Robert Richardson Robertson	1809	1883	
16 April 1875	Samuel Braybrooke	unknown	unknown	Ceylon Rifle Regiment
28 April 1875	Hope Dick	1792	1885	Bengal Infantry
29 April 1875	Sir Charles van Straubenzee	1812	1892	
13 May 1875	Edward Forestier-Walker	1812	1881	
29 May 1875	Thomas Armstrong Drought	c. 1796	1877	
29 May 1875	Charles Stuart	1810	1892	
22 July 1875	Henry Carr Tate	c. 1811	1901	
23 August 1875	David Downing	1802	1888	Bengal Infantry
14 September 1875	Sir Augustus Almeric Spencer	1807	1893	
19 October 1875	Charles Ashmore	c. 1794	1881	
2 November 1875	John Lawrenson	1802	1883	
26 November 1875	Sir John Bloomfield	c. 1793	1880	
26 November 1875	Walter Smee	unknown	1877	Bombay Infantry
2 February 1876	Studholme John Hodgson	1805	1890	
10 February 1876	Francis Seymour, 5th Marquess of Hertford	1812	1884	
15 February 1876	Thomas Chase Parr	1802	1883	Bombay Infantry
27 February 1876	William Turnbull Renwick	1802	1890	
17 March 1876	William Anson McCleverty	1806	1897	
20 March 1876	Sir Arthur Cotton	1803	1899	Held rank in the East Indies.
5 April 1876	Charles Algernon Lewis	1808	1904	
22 May 1876	William Hampton Parlby	1801	1881	
27 May 1876	Prince George, Duke of Cumberland and Teviotdale	1819	1878	Former King George V of Hanover (kingdom annexed by Prussia).
24 June 1876	John Thomas Hill	1811	1902	
19 July 1876	John Longfield	1805	1889	
23 July 1876	David Birrell	1801	1878	Bengal Army
21 November 1876	Sir Frederick Hamilton	1815	1890	
13 December 1876	Thomas Polwhele	1797	1885	Bengal Infantry
19 December 1876	John Fowler Bradford	1805	1889	Bengal Cavalry
1 January 1877	Jayajirao Scindia, Maharaja of Gwalior	1835	1886	
1 January 1877	Ranbir Singh, Maharaja of Jammu and Kashmir	1830	1885	
8 February 1877	Edward Messiter	c.1803	1878	Madras Infantry.
15 March 1877	Charles Hastings Doyle	1804	1883	
15 April 1877	Sir Francis Warde	1790	1879	
24 May 1877	Henry Macan	c.1805	1885	Bombay Infantry.
2 June 1877	Frederick Horn	1805	1894	
2 June 1877	Edward Green	1810	1891	Bombay staff Corps
2 June 1877	Arthur Mitford Becher	1816	1887	Bombay staff Corps
11 July 1877	John Hobson	unknown	1879	Promoted on the retired list. Late of the Bombay Staff Corps.
23 August 1877	John ffolliott Crofton	1800	1885	
1 October 1877	Sir William Ingilby	1791	1879	Late Royal Artillery. Promoted while on the retired list.
1 October 1877	Robert Burn		1878	Royal Artillery. Promoted while on the retired list.
1 October 1877	Charles Grant	1803	1882	Indian Army. Royal (Bengal) Artillery. Promoted while on the retired list.
1 October 1877	George Horton Hyde	1798	1879	honorary
1 October 1877	Thomas Peters Flude	1799	1885	Royal Artillery. Promoted while on the retired list.
1 October 1877	George Twemlow	1795	1877	Royal (Bengal) Artillery. Promoted while on the retired list.
1 October 1877	Thomas Assheton Duke	1805	1887	
1 October 1877	James Clarke Charnock Gray	1794	1891	
1 October 1877	Charlton Thomas Holl	1805	1878	
1 October 1877	Morden Carthew	1805	1888	Commanding Officer 21st Madras Native Infantry, Divisional Commander, Pegu Province, Burma
1 October 1877	Claud Douglas	1800	1883	
1 October 1877	William George White	c. 1799	1878	Late Madras Army.
1 October 1877	Frederick Brooke Corfield	1804	1884	
1 October 1877	William Robert Corfield	1805	1882	
1 October 1877	Sir Francis Wheler, 10th Baronet	1801	1878	
1 October 1877	Hugh Troup	1803	1879	
1 October 1877	Sir Arthur Augustus Thurlow Cunynghame	1812	1884	
1 October 1877	Joshua Simmons Smith	c. 1801	1879	Late 14th Light Dragoons. Promoted while on the retired list.
1 October 1877	Richard Parker	1804	1885	Promoted while on the retired list.
1 October 1877	Sir Charles Trollope	1809	1888	
1 October 1877	Lord George Paget	1818	1880	
1 October 1877	Brook John Taylor	1810	1881	Retired 29 April 1880.
1 October 1877	Edward Rowley Hill	1795	1878	Promoted while on the retired list.
1 October 1877	Richard Albert Bayly	1803	1887	
1 October 1877	William Barclay Goodfellow	1808	1891	
1 October 1877	George William Key	1812	1883	
1 October 1877	David Simpson			
1 October 1877	Thomas Ackers Shone	1800	1886	honorary
1 October 1877	John Macdonald			
1 October 1877	Edward Pole		1879	Promoted while on the retired list.
1 October 1877	Sir Arthur Johnstone Lawrence	1810	1892	
1 October 1877	Sir George Cadogan	1814	1880	
1 October 1877	John Charles Hope Gibsone	1810	1884	
1 October 1877	Charles Philip de Ainslie	1808	1889	
1 October 1877	Freeman Murray	1803	1885	Promoted while on the retired list.
1 October 1877	Alexander Hood, 1st Viscount Bridport	1814	1904	
1 October 1877	Sir David Russell	1809	1884	
1 October 1877	Sir Horatio Shirley	1805	1879	Promoted while on the retired list.
1 October 1877	William Samuel Newton	1816	1889	
1 October 1877	Randal Rumley	1811	1884	Promoted while on the retired list.
1 October 1877	George Weld-Forester, 3rd Baron Forester	1807	1886	Promoted from the retired list.
1 October 1877	Sir Edward Cooper Hodge	1810	1894	
1 October 1877	Thomas Crombie	c. 1806	1877	Promoted while on the retired list.
1 October 1877	Henry Edward Doherty	1817	1885	
1 October 1877	Sir Charles Shepherd Stuart	1805	1879	
1 October 1877	Augustus Halifax Ferryman	1816	1897	
1 October 1877	William Raikes Faber	1806	1879	
1 October 1877	Thomas James Galloway	c. 1806	1881	Promoted while on the retired list.
1 October 1877	Sir John Garvock	1817	1878	
1 October 1877	Sir William Jones	1808	1890	
1 October 1877	Sir Alexander Hamilton-Gordon	1817	1890	
1 October 1877	Corbet Cotton	1809	1885	
1 October 1877	Charles Herrick Burnaby	1801	1885	honorary
1 October 1877	Robert Fitzgerald Copland-Crawford	1810	1895	
1 October 1877	William Couperus McLeod	1806	1880	
1 October 1877	Henry Bates	1813	1893	
1 October 1877	Sir Frederick Edmund Chapman			
1 October 1877	Thomas Maitland Wilson	1806	1889	Promoted while on the retired list.
1 October 1877	George Alexander Baillie			
1 October 1877	George Staunton	1809	1880	
1 October 1877	Charles Crutchley	1810	1898	
1 October 1877	Sir Neville Chamberlain	1820	1902	Promoted to field marshal on 25 April 1900.
1 October 1877	Mark Kerr Atherley	1804	1884	Promoted while on the retired list.
1 October 1877	Sir Trevor Chute	1816	1886	
1 October 1877	William Gustavus Brown	1808	1883	
1 October 1877	William Edward Delves Broughton	1803	1880	Royal Engineers. Promoted while on the retired list.
1 October 1877	Andrew Rowland	1801	1878	Royal (Bombay) Artillery. Promoted while on the retired list.
1 October 1877	Sir Lintorn Simmons	1821	1903	Promoted to field marshal on 21 May 1890.
1 October 1877	Sir William Marcus Coghlan	1803	1885	Royal (Bombay) Artillery. Promoted while on the retired list.
1 October 1877	Henry Jervis			Promoted while on the retired list.
1 October 1877	John Edmondstoune Landers	1803	1885	
1 October 1877	Michael William Smith	1810	1891	
1 October 1877	James Travers	1820	1884	
1 October 1877	John Maxwell Perceval	1814	1900	
1 October 1877	John Liptrap	1794	1878	
1 October 1877	Sir John St George	1812	1891	
1 October 1877	Sir Philip Melmoth Nelson Guy	1804	1878	Promoted while on the retired list.
1 October 1877	Sir Francis Seymour, 1st Baronet	1813	1890	
1 October 1877	Hubert Marshall			Indian Army
1 October 1877	John Leslie Dennis	1810	1889	
1 October 1877	Sir Frederick Haines	1819	1909	Local rank in the East Indies from 22 March 1876. Promoted to field marshal on 21 May 1890.
1 October 1877	John Arthur Lambert	1817	1887	
1 October 1877	Sir William O'Grady Haly	1811	1878	
1 October 1877	Henry Phipps Raymond	1808	1897	
1 October 1877	Lord Henry Percy	1817	1877	
1 October 1877	William Craig Emilius Napier	1818	1903	
1 October 1877	Sir Charles Ellice	1823	1888	
1 October 1877	Peter Thomas Cherry	1809	1888	
1 October 1877	Henry Richmond Jones	1808	1880	
1 October 1877	Auchmuty Tucker	1804	1891	Bengal staff Corps. Promoted while on the retired list.
1 October 1877	Sir Thomas Myddelton Biddulph	1809	1878	
1 October 1877	Charles Hagart	1814	1879	
1 October 1877	Sir Thomas Steele	1820	1890	
1 October 1877	James Pattoun Sparks	1801	1881	Promoted while on the retired list.
1 October 1877	Edward Darvall	1806	1885	Bengal staff Corps. Promoted while on the retired list.
1 October 1877	Sir Richard Wilbraham	1811	1900	
1 October 1877	Henry Palmer	1807	1892	Bengal staff Corps. Promoted while on the retired list.
1 October 1877	Sir William Erskine Baker	1808	1881	Bengal Engineers.
1 October 1877	Edward William Durnford	1804	1889	Royal Engineers. Promoted while on the retired list.
1 October 1877	David Pott			
1 October 1877	William Irwin			
1 October 1877	Henry Darby Griffith	1810	1887	
1 October 1877	Richard Cornwallis Moore	1807	1879	Royal (Madras) Artillery. Promoted while on the retired list.
1 October 1877	James Webber Smith			
1 October 1877	Frederick Darley George	1808	1888	
1 October 1877	Sir George Balfour	1809	1894	
1 October 1877	John Yorke	1814	1890	
1 October 1877	Prince Christian of Schleswig-Holstein	1831	1917	
1 October 1877	Philip Kearney McGregor Skinner	1806	1880	Bombay staff corps. Promoted while on the retired list.
1 October 1877	William Edward Mulcaster	1820	1887	
1 October 1877	Orfeur Cavenagh	1820	1891	
1 October 1877	John Hamilton Elphinstone Dalrymple	1819	1888	
1 October 1877	John Stafford Paton	1821	1889	
1 October 1877	Henry Joseph Pelly	1818	1891	
1 October 1877	James Macleod Bannatyne Fraser-Tytler		1821	1914
1 October 1877	Robert Romer Younghusband	1819	1905	
1 October 1877	Richard Shubrick	1820	1888	
1 October 1877	Henry Hope Graham			
1 October 1877	Henry Renny	1815	1900	
1 October 1877	William Binfield Wemyss	1810	1890	
1 October 1877	John Jarvis Bisset	1819	1894	
1 October 1877	Sir Charles Reid	1818	1901	Indian Army
1 October 1877	Sir Edward Alan Holdich	1822	1909	
1 October 1877	Sir Charles Staveley	1817	1896	
1 October 1877	Robert Newton Phillips		1889	
1 October 1877	George Palmer Whish	1814	1902	
1 October 1877	Sir George Malcolm	1818	1897	
1 October 1877	Sir Alfred Hastings Horsford	1818	1885	
1 October 1877	Sir Edward Lechmere Russell	1818	1904	
1 October 1877	Walter Douglas Phillips Patton-Bethune	1822	1901	
1 October 1877	Sir Edward Charles Warde	1811	1884	
1 October 1877	Henry Frederick Dunsford			
1 October 1877	Christopher Birdwood	1807	1882	
1 October 1877	George Wynne			Royal Engineers. Promoted while on the retired list.
1 October 1877	George William Bishop			
1 October 1877	Sir Collingwood Dickson	1817	1904	
1 October 1877	Sir David Edward Wood	1812	1894	
1 October 1877	James Abbott	1807	1896	Indian Army. Royal (Bengal) Artillery. Promoted while on the retired list.
1 October 1877	Sir James William Fitzmayer	1813	1895	
1 October 1877	Frank Turner			
1 October 1877	Sir Henry Drury Harness	1804	1883	Royal Engineer. Promoted while on the retired list.
1 October 1877	Sir James Brind	1808	1888	
1 October 1877	Alfred Huyshe	1812	1880	
1 October 1877	Thomas Kensington Whistler	1805	1885	Royal (Madras) Artillery. Promoted while on the retired list.
1 October 1877	George William Young Simpson			
1 October 1877	Charles Erskine Ford	1812	1884	
1 October 1877	George Ramsay			
1 October 1877	John Hankey Bainbrigge	1791	1881	
1 October 1877	Lewis Alexander During	unknown	unknown	
1 October 1877	Thomas Charlton Smith	c. 1795	1883	
1 October 1877	The Honourable Arthur Legge	1800	1890	
1 October 1877	Melville Dalyell	1801	1887	
1 October 1877	Henry Sykes Stephens	1796	1878	
1 October 1877	James McQueen	c. 1797	1883	
1 October 1877	Rawdon Vassall	1804	1884	78th Highlanders
4 December 1877	Sir Arthur Borton	1814	1893	
21 December 1877	Henry Blois Turner	1808		
18 March 1878	David Elliot Mackirdy		1894	
20 March 1878	John Studholme Brownrigg	1815	1889	
20 May 1878	Sir William McMurdo	1819	1894	
25 June 1878	William Munro	1818	1880	
10 August 1878	Arnold Charles Errington	1806	1890	
16 September 1878	William Mark Wood	1817	1883	
29 September 1878	Henry Smyth	1816	1891	
3 November 1878	Thomas Augustus Carey	1827	1892	
11 November 1878	Lord Mark Ralph George Kerr	1817	1900	
31 December 1878	John Archibald Ballard	1829	1880	
1879	William Sherbrooke Ramsay Norcott	1804	1886	
1 January 1879	Sir Henry de Bathe, 4th Baronet	1823	1907	
27 January 1879	Richard Waddy	1814	1881	
27 April 1879	Thomas Brooke	1816	1880	
27 May 1879	Henry Dalrymple White	1821	1886	
4 June 1879	Penrose Charles Penrose	1823	1902	
11 June 1879	George Wade Guy Green	1825	1891	
25 June 1879	Henry James Stannus		1898	
27 June 1879	William Harrison Askwith	1811	1897	
10 July 1879	Henry Alexander Carleton	1814	1900	
14 July 1879	Sir Daniel Lysons	1816	1898	
18 July 1879	Henry William Blake	1815	1908	
14 November 1879	Prince Edward of Saxe-Weimar	1823	1902	promoted to field marshal in 1897
1 January 1880	Crawford Trotter Chamberlain	1821	1902	
30 January 1880	Sir John Douglas	1817	1888	
15 February 1880	William Frost Nuthall	1808	1902	
15 February 1880	Sir Arnold Burrowes Kemball	1820	1908	
4 March 1880	Sir Henry Charles Barnston Daubeney	1810	1903	
16 March 1880	Richard Curzon-Howe, 3rd Earl Howe	1822	1900	
12 April 1880	Sir Thomas Westropp McMahon, Bt	1814	1892	
19 April 1880	Alexander Maxwell	1816		
29 April 1880	Sir Richard Thomas Farren	1817	1909	
8 May 1880	Robert Wardlow	1817	1885	
21 May 1880	John Thornton Grant	1811	1886	
22 May 1880	Alexander Low	1817	1904	
1 July 1880	Edward Harris Greathed	1812	1881	
7 September 1880	William Neville Custance	1811	1886	
5 November 1880	Sir Richard Denis Kelly	1815	1897	
15 December 1880	Reynell George Taylor	1822	1886	
19 December 1880	Sir Robert Rollo	1814	1907	
26 December 1880	Sir Henry James Warre	1819	1898	
12 April 1881	Alfred Thomas Heyland	1813	1897	
10 May 1881	Sir Michael Kavanagh Kennedy	1824	1898	
18 June 1881	George Vaughan Maxwell	1819	1892	
1 July 1881	Edmund Richard Jeffreys	1809	1889	
1 July 1881	Julius Augustus Robert Raines	1827	1909	
1 July 1881	John William Sidney Smith	1815	1900	
1 July 1881	Edward Stopford Claremont	1819	1890	
1 July 1881	Charles Cameron Shute	1816	1904	
1 July 1881	Thomas Sydenham Conway	1810	1885	
1 July 1881	Lord Alfred Paget	1816	1888	
1 July 1881	William James Smythe	1816	1887	
1 July 1881	Robert Gorges Hamilton		1899	
1 July 1881	William Charles Hadden	1813	1902	
1 July 1881	Henry Errington Longden	1819	1890	
1 July 1881	Henry Roxby Benson	1818	1892	
1 July 1881	Sir James Talbot Airey	1812	1898	
1 July 1881	Wilmot Henry Bradford	1815	1914	
1 July 1881	William Twisleton Layard	1814	1891	
1 July 1881	Joseph Henry Laye	1817	1895	
1 July 1881	William Charles Forrest	1819	1902	
1 July 1881	James William Bosville Macdonald	1810	1882	
1 July 1881	Robert Julian Baumgartner	1814	1895	
1 July 1881	George Calvert Clarke	1814	1900	
1 July 1881	Charles Francis Fordyce	1820	1887	
1 July 1881	Robert William Disney Leith	1819	1892	
1 July 1881	William Richard Preston	1807	1892	
1 July 1881	Sir Edward Stanton	1827	1907	
1 July 1881	Thomas Conyngham Kelly	1809	1887	
1 July 1881	Sir Henry Frederick Ponsonby	1825	1895	
1 July 1881	Edmund Ogle			
1 July 1881	George Erskine		1897	
1 July 1881	Edward George Wynyard	1818	1889	
1 July 1881	Thomas Pattle	1812	1881	
1 July 1881	William Lenox Ingall	1823	1888	
1 July 1881	James Colborne, 2nd Baron Seaton	1816	1888	
1 July 1881	Sir John Summerfield Hawkins	1817	1895	
1 July 1881	Horace William Montagu	1823	1916	
1 July 1881	Charles Douglas			
1 July 1881	Robert Pratt			
1 July 1881	Charles James Conway Mills	1817	1894	
1 July 1881	Charles Fanshawe	1816	1901	
1 July 1881	Sir John Josiah Hort	1824	1882	
1 July 1881	Albert Fytche	1820	1892	
1 July 1881	Sir Donald Stewart, 1st Baronet	1824	1900	Promoted to field marshal on 26 May 1894.
1 July 1881	Henry Garner Rainey	1813	1887	
1 July 1881	Richard Walter Lacy			
1 July 1881	Ralph Budd			
1 July 1881	John Amber Cole	1811	1890	
1 July 1881	Edward Herbert Maxwell			
1 July 1881	John McNeill Walter	1819	1898	
1 July 1881	Joseph Edwin Thackwell	1813	1900	
1 July 1881	Joseph Edward Addison	1821	1890	
1 July 1881	Edmund Roche		1897	
1 July 1881	William Inglis	1823	1888	
1 July 1881	Lawrence Shadwell	1823	1887	
1 July 1881	Sir Henry Edward Landor Thuillier	1835	1906	
1 July 1881	George Frederick Stevenson Call	1820	1895	
1 July 1881	Robert Bruce			
1 July 1881	John Elias Collings	1821	1886	
1 July 1881	George Selby			
1 July 1881	Thomas Addison		1890	Honorary General
1 July 1881	Frederick Robert Elrington	1820	1904	
1 July 1881	Charles Lavallin Nugent	1816	1884	
1 July 1881	Percy Archer Butler			
1 July 1881	William Sankey			
1 July 1881	Edmund Wodehouse	1818	1898	
1 July 1881	Fowler Burton	1822	1904	
1 July 1881	William Gordon			
1 July 1881	John Hope Wingfield			
1 July 1881	Augustus Charles Lennox Fitzroy, 7th Duke of Grafton	1821	1918	
1 July 1881	James Daubeny			
1 July 1881	Edward Price			
1 July 1881	Robert Warden			
1 July 1881	Charles Henry Morris			
1 July 1881	Charles William Thompson			
1 July 1881	Michael Bruce			
1 July 1881	Robert Walter Macleod Fraser		1896	
1 July 1881	George William Powlett Bingham	1817	1899	
1 July 1881	Sir William Hope, 14th Baronet	1819	1898	
1 July 1881	Thomas Edmond Knox	1820	1898	
1 July 1881	William James Loftus			
1 July 1881	Augustus Francis Ansell	1803	1887	Honorary general
1 July 1881	Thomas Hooke Pearson	1806	1892	Honorary general
1 July 1881	Sir James Edward Alexander	1803	1885	Honorary general.
1 July 1881	William Clarke		1881	Honorary general
1 July 1881	Samuel Wells			Honorary general
1 July 1881	Colin McIntyre	1806	1887	Honorary general
1 July 1881	John Roche			Honorary general
10 July 1881	Sir St George Gerald Foley	1814	1897	
13 July 1881	Henry Poole Hepburn	1822	1888	
18 July 1881	William Frederick Curtis	1810	1882	Honorary general
13 August 1881	Spencer Westmacott	1817	1890	
1 October 1881	Henry Meade Hamilton	1819	1895	Honorary general
19 October 1881	William Collier Menzies	1818		

== 1882–1899 ==
Promoted	Name	Born	Died	Notes
15 January 1882	William John Chamberlayne	1821	1910	
18 January 1882	Henry St Clair Wilkins	1828	1896	
9 March 1882	Edward Selby Smyth	1819	1896	
1 April 1882	Sir Alexander Macdonell	1820	1891	Honorary general
1 April 1882	Sir William Parke	1822	1897	Honorary general
1 April 1882	Hon. Sir Francis Colborne	1817	1895	
1 April 1882	Sir Henry Norman	1826	1904	Promoted to Field Marshal on 26 June 1902.
26 April 1882	John Bayly	1821	1905	
12 May 1882	William Sparkes Hatch	1824	1914	
1 October 1882	Henry Lynedoch Gardiner	1820	1897	
1 November 1882	Samuel Enderby Gordon	1824	1883	
18 November 1882	Garnet Wolseley, 1st Baron Wolseley	1833	1913	Granted local (in South Africa) and temporary promotion to full general from 4 June 1879. Promoted to the substantive rank of general on 18 November 1882. Promoted to field marshal on 26 May 1894; later Viscount Wolseley.
31 March 1883	Sir William Olpherts VC	1822	1902	
31 March 1883	Henry Hamilton Maxwell	1824	1892	
31 March 1883	William David Aitken		1897	
31 March 1883	Charles Bowdler Fuller	1822	1904	
31 March 1883	Andrew William Macintire		1885	
31 March 1883	Henry Price de Teissier	1820	1895	
31 March 1883	Sir Robert Cadell	1825	1897	
1 April 1883	Sir Richard Chambré Hayes Taylor	1819	1904	
1 April 1883	Arthur Edward Hardinge	1828	1892	
1 June 1883	John Augustus Fuller	1828	1902	
31 December 1883	William Francis Clarke Gosling			
12 January 1884	James Thomas Walker	1826	1896	
13 January 1884	Sir John Alexander Ewart	1821	1904	
1 April 1884	Sir Charles Laurence D'Aguilar	1821	1912	
23 August 1884	Alexander Robert Manson	1823	1900	Bombay Infantry
23 August 1884	Sir William Templer Hughes	1822	1897	
7 October 1884	Charles Pyndar Beauchamp Walker	1817	1894	
20 November 1884	John Miller Adye	1819	1900	
1 December 1884	Charles Lennox Brownlow Maitland	1823	1891	
1 January 1885	Sir William Henry Seymour	1829	1921	
19 March 1885	Sir Arthur Herbert	1820	1897	
1 May 1885	Henry Peel Yates		1896	
1 July 1885	David Macdowall Fraser	1825	1906	
8 July 1885	Henry Ralph Browne	1828	1917	
30 September 1885	Francis Peyton	1823	1905	
5 November 1885	Sir Frederick Francis Maude	1821	1897	
28 November 1885	George Warren Walker			
28 November 1885	Francis Hornblow Rundall	1823	1908	
28 November 1885	Charles Waterloo Hutchinson	1824	1890	
4 January 1886	James Farrell Pennycuick	1829	1888	
12 January 1886	Sir Frederick Arthur Charles Stephenson	1821	1911	
1 February 1886	Peregrine Henry Fellowes	1821	1891	
3 February 1886	Sir John Forbes	1817	1906	
3 February 1886	George Samuel Montgomery	1820	1898	
1 April 1886	Philip Gosset Pipon	1824	1905	
7 April 1886	Lord Alexander Russell	1821	1907	
5 July 1886	Sir Frederick Alexander Campbell			
18 July 1886	Sir Charles Adair	1822	1897	
16 September 1886	Alexander Fraser	1824	1898	
1 October 1886	Sir Julius Richard Glyn	1824	1910	
1 November 1886	Michael Anthony Shrapnel Biddulph	1823	1904	
27 January 1887	John Frederick Fischer	1828	1913	
21 February 1887	Frederick Richard Maunsell	1828	1916	
21 February 1887	Charles James Merriman	1831	1906	
22 February 1887	Harry North Dalrymple Prendergast	1834	1913	
1 April 1887	Sir Robert Onesiphorus Bright	1823	1896	
1 April 1887	Edward Westby Donovan	1821	1897	
1 April 1887	Sir William Pollexfen Radcliffe	1822	1897	
15 April 1887	Charles M'Arthur			
11 May 1887	Sir George Willis	1823	1900	
22 June 1887	Edward Laws Pym			
1 October 1887	Francis William Hastings	1825	1914	
12 February 1888	James Frankfort Manners Browne	1823	1910	
15 February 1888	Frederic Thesiger, 2nd Baron Chelmsford	1827	1905	London Gazette says made General 16 December 1888
21 May 1888	John William Collman Williams	1824	1911	
21 May 1888	Edmund Henry Cox		1893	
17 July 1888	David Anderson	1821	1909	
12 August 1888	Sir William Payn	1823	1893	
1 December 1888	Sir Henry Dominick Daly			
1 December 1888	Sir John Luther Vaughan	1820	1911	
1 December 1888	Sir Sam Browne VC	1824	1901	creator of the eponymous belt
1 December 1888	Charles Cureton	1826	1891	
1 December 1888	Sir Dighton Macnaghten Probyn	1833	1924	
1 December 1888	Brooke Boyd			
1 December 1888	John Liptrott			
1 December 1888	Robert John Hawthorne			
1 December 1888	Stephen Francis Macmullen			
1 December 1888	William Vine			
1 December 1888	William George Owen			
1 December 1888	Samuel Brougham Faddy	1817	1890	
1 December 1888	Richard Andrew Doria	1815	1892	
1 December 1888	Gordon Caulfield			
1 December 1888	David Scott Dodgson	1821	1898	
1 December 1888	Alexander Crombie Silver	1822	1891	
1 December 1888	John Penrose Coode	1822	1895	
1 December 1888	Edward Dayot Watson	1816	1900	
1 December 1888	John William Schneider	1824	1903	
1 December 1888	Douglas Hamilton	1818	1892	
1 December 1888	David Brown			
1 December 1888	Arthur Newbolt Rich	1821	1912	
1 December 1888	Henry Augustus Adams	1814	1898	
1 December 1888	William Warden Anderson			
1 December 1888	Sir John Field	1821	1899	
1 December 1888	John Gustavus Halliday	1822	1917	
1 December 1888	John Gordon			
1 December 1888	William Thomas Williams			
1 December 1888	Francis Walker Drummond			
1 December 1888	William Wilkinson Taylor			
1 December 1888	George Strangways	1821	1904	
1 December 1888	Frederick Charles Maisey	1825	1892	
1 December 1888	Henry Borlase Stevens	1824	1904	
1 December 1888	James Buchanan			
1 December 1888	William Henry Watts			
1 December 1888	George Travis Radcliffe	1825	1904	
22 January 1889	Robert Napier Raikes	1813	1909	
22 January 1889	Sir Henry Ramsay	1816	1893	
22 January 1889	Richard Charles Lawrence	1817	1896	
22 January 1889	Henry Nicoll	1816	1907	
22 January 1889	Crawford Cooke			
22 January 1889	John Wilson			
22 January 1889	Septimus Harding Becher	1817	1908	
22 January 1889	John Samuel Drury Tulloch	1815	1899	
22 January 1889	Molyneux Capel Spottiswoode	1816	1890	
22 January 1889	Henry Man			
22 January 1889	Charles Lionel Showers			
22 January 1889	Augustus Turner	1816		
22 January 1889	William Charles Robertson Macdonald			
22 January 1889	Anthony Robert Thornhill			
22 January 1889	John Cheap Brooke	1819	1899	
22 January 1889	Robert Woolley			
22 January 1889	Charles Robert West Hervey			
22 January 1889	James Eardley Gastrell	1819	1894	
22 January 1889	Thomas Thompson			
22 January 1889	Stephen James Keate Whitehill	1820	1893	
22 January 1889	George Alexander Leckie	1821	1894	
22 January 1889	Henry Dyett Abbott	1816	1892	
22 January 1889	Edward William Boudier	1819	1890	
22 January 1889	Solomon Richards			
22 January 1889	Montague James Turnbull	1820	1894	
22 January 1889	Sir Robert Phayre	1820	1897	
22 January 1889	Charles Campbell M'Callum			
22 January 1889	Thomas Greenaway			
22 January 1889	Daniel Boyd			
22 January 1889	Francis Young			
22 January 1889	Sir Alfred William Lucas	1822	1896	
22 January 1889	Henry Hastings Affleck Wood			
22 January 1889	Francis Adams Ellis Loch	1827	1891	
22 January 1889	Henry Hopkinson			
22 January 1889	Rowland Rees Mainwaring			
22 January 1889	Alfred Fox Place		1902	
22 January 1889	Henry Knightley Burne			
22 January 1889	Charles Terrington Aitchison			
22 January 1889	Sir Richard John Meade	1821	1894	
22 January 1889	John Murray Macgregor			
22 January 1889	George Holroyd			
22 January 1889	John Robert M'Mullin			
22 January 1889	Frederic J. B. Priestley	1820	1894	
22 January 1889	Frederick Peter Layard			
22 January 1889	Alfred Cooper			
22 January 1889	Arthur Howlett			
22 January 1889	Sir Charles Brownlow	1831	1916	Promoted to field marshal on 20 June 1908.
20 February 1889	Sir Archibald Alison, 2nd Baronet	1826	1907	
31 July 1890	Sir Charles George Arbuthnot	1824	1899	
11 October 1890	Sir George Wentworth Alexander Higginson	1826	1927	
11 November 1890	Sir Robert White	1827	1902	
28 November 1890	Frederick Roberts, 1st Earl Roberts VC	1832	1914	Promoted supernumerary general in 1890 and substantive general in 1891. Promoted to field marshal 25 May 1895. Commander-in-Chief, India , Commander-in-Chief of the Forces
28 January 1891	Eyre Challoner Henry Massey, 4th Baron Clarina	1830	1897	
1 March 1891	Jonathan Augustus Spry Faulknor			
1 March 1891	Sir John Watson	1829	1919	
1 March 1891	Edward James Lawder	1822	1900	
1 March 1891	William Coursmaker Anderson	1823	1893	
1 March 1891	Edmond Francis Burton			
1 March 1891	George Uvedale Price			
1 March 1891	Robson Benson	1822	1894	
1 March 1891	John Matthew Cripps	1823	1892	
1 March 1891	Julius Bentall Dennys	1822	1907	
1 March 1891	John Cockburn Hood			
1 March 1891	George Baldock			
1 March 1891	William Legh Cahusac	1823	1905	
1 March 1891	Charles Curtis Drury			
1 March 1891	Edward Thomas Fasken	1823	1900	
1 March 1891	Richard Drapes Ardagh			
1 March 1891	James Nowell Young			
1 March 1891	John Loudon			
1 March 1891	Hugh Heefke O'Connell			
1 March 1891	William Alexander Riach	1823	1898	
1 March 1891	Augustus Ritherdon	1823	1899	
1 March 1891	John Irvine Murray	1826	1902	
1 March 1891	Percy Fortescue Gardiner	1822	1896	
1 April 1891	Sir John Ross	1829	1905	
1 April 1891	Sir Percy Robert Basil Feilding	1827	1904	
19 May 1891	Sir Henry Smyth	1825	1906	
1 April 1892	Sir Edward Gascoigne Bulwer	1829	1910	
16 July 1892	Sir Martin Andrew Dillon	1826	1913	
25 November 1892	Sir Robert Biddulph	1835	1918	
21 January 1893	Sir William Gordon Cameron	1827	1913	
15 February 1893	Sir Mark Walker	1827	1902	
13 March 1893	Charles John Foster	1817	1896	Honorary general
1 April 1893	Prince Arthur, Duke of Connaught and Strathearn	1850	1942	Promoted to field marshal 26 June 1902.
7 June 1893	Sir John Hart Dunne	1835	1924	
21 June 1893	Thomas Casey Lyons	1829	1897	
28 June 1893	Sir Wilbraham Oates Lennox	1830	1897	
1 April 1894	James Gathorne Cookson			
1 April 1894	Patrick George Scot			
1 April 1894	Henry Alexander Cockburn			
1 April 1894	William Martin Cafe	1826	1906	
1 April 1894	William Gordon			
1 April 1894	Charles Lyons-Montgomery			
1 April 1894	Edmund Frederick Waterman	1825	1901	
1 April 1894	John March Earle			
1 April 1894	Edward Samuel Jackson		1902	
1 April 1894	Frederick Schneider			
1 April 1894	Charles Hight			
1 April 1894	George Pringle			
1 April 1894	Richard Harte Keatinge	1825	1904	
1 April 1894	Sir John Doran	1824	1903	
1 April 1894	Hugh Rose			
1 April 1894	John Gray Touch	1824	1902	
1 April 1894	Charles Thompson			
1 April 1894	Alexander Carnegy	1829	1900	
1 April 1894	George Smart			
1 April 1894	James Cadogan Parkinson Baillie			
1 April 1894	Horace Albert Browne			
1 April 1894	William Butler Butler-Shawe	1829	1905	
1 April 1894	Charles Renny Blair	1834	1912	
1 April 1894	William Robert Houghton			
1 April 1894	Lewis William Buck	1824	1912	
1 April 1894	Augustus Becher Marsack	1825	1898	
1 April 1894	Charles Scott Elliot			
1 April 1894	Harry Cortlandt Anderson	1826	1921	
1 April 1894	Herbert Henderson James			
1 April 1894	William Fraser Stephens			
1 April 1894	James Blair	1828	1905	
1 April 1894	John Alexander Matthew Macdonald	1824	1900	
1 April 1894	Arthur Drury			
1 April 1894	George Scougall Macbean	1825	1903	
1 April 1894	William George Mainwaring	1823	1905	
1 April 1894	William Anthony Gib	1827	1915	
1 April 1894	George William Fraser	1822	1904	
1 April 1894	Hungerford Meyer Boddam	1825	1904	
1 April 1894	William Chase Parr	1827	1895	
1 April 1894	Sir Charles Cooper Johnson	1827	1905	
1 April 1894	George Crommelin Hankin	1826	1902	
1 April 1894	Abraham Charles Bunbury			
1 April 1894	Francis Dawson			
1 April 1894	George Forbes Hogg	1832	1896	
1 April 1894	Sir Mowbray Thomson	1832	1917	
1 April 1894	Sir Charles John Stanley Gough	1832	1912	
1 April 1894	Frederick Roome	1828	1907	
1 April 1894	Thomas Gilbert Kennedy	1832	1896	Bunjab Frontier Force
1 April 1894	Howard Codrington Dowker	1829	1912	
1 April 1894	Mangles James Brander	1828	1903	
1 April 1894	James Michael			
1 April 1894	Andrew Robert Clephane			Indian staff Corps
1 April 1894	Charles Henry Hall			
1 April 1894	Edward Owen Leggatt	1827	1902	
1 April 1894	Richard Alexander Moore	1827	1898	
1 April 1894	Charles Edward Bates			
1 April 1894	John Miles			
1 April 1894	William Charles Robert Mylne	1827	1910	
1 April 1894	John Wood Rideout	1827	1904	
1 April 1894	Walter Theodore Chitty	1826	1904	
1 April 1894	Thomas Mowbray Baumgartner	1825	1915	
1 April 1894	James Kempt Couper	1827	1901	
1 April 1894	William James Pratt Barlow	1837	1910	
1 April 1894	Reginald Quintin Mainwaring	1828	1903	
1 April 1894	Augustus Kirkwood Comber	1828	1895	
1 April 1894	Frederick Cortlandt Anderson			
1 April 1894	Montgomery Hunter	1827	1901	
1 April 1894	Edward Dandridge	1829	1911	
1 April 1894	Sir Thomas Edward Gordon	1832	1914	
1 April 1894	William Bannerman			
1 April 1894	Thomas Spence Hawks			
1 April 1894	Isaac Forsyth MacAndrew	1827	1901	
1 April 1894	Sir John James Hood Gordon	1832	1908	
16 May 1894	Sir Hugh Henry Gough	1833	1909	
26 May 1894	Sir Reginald Gipps	1831	1908	
16 October 1894	Sir Hugh Rowlands	1828	1909	
26 March 1895	Sir Evelyn Wood	1838	1919	Promoted to field marshal on 8 April 1903.
1 April 1895	Æneas Perkins	1834	1901	
8 May 1895	Sir Richard Harrison	1837	1931	
25 May 1895	George Godfrey Pearse	1827	1905	
25 May 1895	Abingdon Augustus Bayly			
25 May 1895	James Edward Cordner	1829	1901	
25 May 1895	Elliot Minto Playfair	1828	1899	
25 May 1895	Walter D'Oyly Kerrich	1834	1908	
25 May 1895	Duncan John McGrigor	1834	1909	
25 May 1895	Sir William Stirling-Hamilton, 10th Baronet	1830	1913	
25 May 1895	Thomas Nicholl			
25 May 1895	Harry McLeod			
18 March 1896	Sir Arthur Lyon Fremantle	1835	1901	
15 March 1896	Edward Francis Chapman	1840	1926	
6 May 1896	Sir George Richards Greaves	1831	1922	
24 June 1896	Sir Redvers Buller VC	1839	1908	Commander-in-Chief of British Forces in South Africa
4 July 1895	Alexander George Montgomery Moore	1833	1919	
9 November 1896	Sir William Lockhart	1841	1900	
9 November 1896	Horace Searle Anderson	1833	1907	
20 March 1898	Sir Charles Nairne	1836	1899	Promoted to local rank of general (East Indies) on 20 March 1898.
14 December 1898	Prince Ernest Augustus, Duke of Cumberland and Teviotdale	1845	1923	Crown Prince of Hannover. Removed in 1915, and deprived of his British titles in 1919 for "bearing arms against Great Britain.".
1899	Sir Arthur Palmer	1840	1904	
1899	George Nicholas Channer	1843	1905	

== 1900–1939 ==
Promoted	Name	Born	Died	Notes
19 March 1900	Sir Richard Campbell Stewart			Madras Cavalry, Indian Army
6 April 1900	Sir George Barker	1833	1914	
9 October 1900	Sir George Stuart White	1835	1912	Promoted Field Marshal, 8 April 1903
26 September 1901	Sir Henry Brackenbury	1837	1914	Temporary rank 6 February 1899 while serving as Inspector-General of Ordnance; substantive rank 26 September 1901. Colonel Commandant Royal Artillery
9 November 1901	Sir Horace Moule Evans	1841	1923	Indian staff Corps
5 January 1902	Sir William Stirling	1835	1906	Lieutenant of the Tower, Governor of the Royal Military Academy.
1 June 1902	Herbert Kitchener, 1st Viscount Kitchener	1850	1916	Promoted to local rank of general (in South Africa) before 12 December 1900. Promoted to substantive general on 1 June 1902. Promoted to field marshal on 10 September 1909; later Earl Kitchener
26 June 1902	Prince George, Prince of Wales	1866	1936	In the 1902 Coronation Honours list; Assumed the rank of field marshal on 7 May 1910 the day after his accession as King George V.
6 July 1902	Sir Frederick Forestier-Walker	1844	1910	later Governor of Gibraltar
5 August 1902	Sir Charles Mansfield Clarke, 3rd Baronet	1839	1932	Quartermaster-General to the Forces, later Governor of Malta
27 August 1902	Sir Cecil James East	1837	1908	
25 October 1902	Lord William Frederick Ernest Seymour	1838	1915	Lieutenant of the Tower of London
1903	King Christian IX of Denmark	1818	1906	
1903	Sir Baker Russell	1837	1911	
16 March 1904	Francis Grenfell, 1st Baron Grenfell	1841	1925	Promoted to field marshal on 11 April 1908.
26 May 1904	Paul Methuen, 3rd Baron Methuen	1845	1932	Promoted to field marshal on 19 June 1911.
1904	Sir Charles Warren	1840	1927	
17 May 1905	King Alfonso XIII of Spain	1886	1941	promoted to field marshal on 3 June 1928.
8 December 1905	Sir Archibald Hunter	1856	1936	
23 May 1906	Sir George Luck	1840	1916	
23 October 1906	Sir William Nicholson	1845	1918	Promoted to field marshal on 19 June 1911; later Baron Nicholson.
28 October 1906	Sir Charles Egerton	1848	1921	Indian Army. Promoted to field marshal on 16 March 1917.
1906	Sir Bindon Blood	1842	1940	
1906	}}Sir Alfred Gaselee	1844	1918	Indian Army.
1906	}}Sir Neville Lyttelton	1845	1931	
1906	}}Sir Donald James Sim McLeod	1845	1922	Indian Army.
12 February 1907	}}Sir John French	1852	1925	Promoted to field marshal 3 June 1913; later Earl of Ypres.
14 October 1907	}}Sir Ian Standish Monteith Hamilton	1853	1947	
11 December 1907	}}Sir O'Moore Creagh	1848	1923	
27 July 1909	}}Sir Edmund Barrow	1852	1934	
1909	}}Sir Charles Burnett	1842	1915	
10 September 1909	}}Sir Leslie Rundle	1856	1934	
1 October 1910	Sir Charles Douglas	1850	1914	Died while serving as the Chief of the Imperial General Staff.
3 June 1911	Sir Beauchamp Duff	1855	1918	Indian Army.
	Arthur Singleton Wynne	1846	1936	
6 August 1912	Louis Botha	1862	1919	honorary. Prime Minister of Union of South Africa
10 August 1912	Sir Horace Smith-Dorrien	1858	1930	
4 September 1912	Sir Henry Grant	1848	1919	
5 March 1913	Sir Arthur Paget	1851	1928	
3 June 1913	Sir Bruce Hamilton	1857	1936	
6 October 1913	Sir Henry Mackinnon	1852	1929	
5 November 1913	Sir Reginald Wingate	1861	1953	
1914	Douglas Haig, 1st Earl Haig	1861	1928	Promoted to field marshal in 1917.
4 May 1915	Sir James Willcocks	1857	1926	
11 June 1915	Herbert Plumer, 1st Viscount Plumer	1857	1932	Promoted to field marshal on 31 July 1919.
1915	Sir Charles Monro, 1st Baronet	1860	1929	
6 October 1915	King Vajiravudh of Siam	1880	1925	honorary
1916	Sir William Robertson	1860	1933	Promoted to field marshal in 1920.
1917	Sir Henry Wilson, 1st Baronet	1864	1922	Temporary promotion to full general in 1917, substantive promotion to full general in 1918. Promoted to field marshal in 1919.
1917	Sir Edmund Allenby	1861	1936	Promoted to field marshal in 1919; later Viscount Allenby.
1917	Sir Arthur Barrett	1857	1926	Indian Army. Promoted to field marshal in 1921.
23 October 1917	William Birdwood, 1st Baron Birdwood	1865	1951	Promoted to field marshal on 20 March 1925.
1917	Julian Byng, 1st Viscount Byng of Vimy	1862	1935	Later promoted to field marshal.
1917	Henry Horne, 1st Baron Horne	1861	1929	
1917	Henry Rawlinson, 1st Baron Rawlinson	1864	1925	
1918	Sir Nevil Macready	1862	1946	
1919	Sir John Grenfell Maxwell	1859	1929	
1 January 1919	Sir John Cowans	1862	1921	
1919	Sir Archibald Murray	1860	1945	
22 December 1919	Sir Chandra Shamsher Jang Bahadur Rana	1863	1929	honorary. Prime minister of Nepal
28 January 1921	Sir Havelock Hudson	1862	1944	
1920	Sir Herbert Cox	1860	1923	
26 April 1920	Sir George Milne	1866	1948	Promoted to field marshal on 30 January 1928; later Baron Milne.
31 May 1920	Sir Claud Jacob	1863	1948	Promoted to field marshal on 30 November 1926.
1920	Sir Thomas Morland	1865	1925	Temporary promotion 1920. November 1922, substantive promotion to full general.
9 May 1921	Emperor Hirohito of Japan	1901	1989	honorary; promoted to field marshal on 26 June 1930.
2 November 1921	Rudolph Lambart, 10th Earl of Cavan	1865	1946	Promoted to field marshal on 31 October 1932.
26 July 1921	Sir Bryan Mahon	1862	1930	
26 July 1921	Sir Francis Davies	1864	1948	
26 July 1921	Sir Charles Fergusson, 7th Baronet	1865	1951	
26 October 1922	Sir Hubert Gough	1870	1963	Granted the honorary rank of general on retirement.
25 November 1922	Sir Walter Congreve	1862	1927	
17 February 1923	Sir Alexander Godley	1867	1957	
1923	Sir Ivor Maxse	1862	1958	
1924	Sir Alexander Cobbe	1870	1931	
1924	Sir Joseph John Asser	1867	1949	
4 May 1925	Sir Edward Bulfin	1862	1939	
22 May 1925	Sir Richard Haking	1862	1945	
1926	Sir Noel Birch	1865	1939	Master-General of the Ordnance
1 June 1926	Philip Chetwode, 1st Baron Chetwode	1869	1950	Promoted to field marshal on 13 February 1933.
1926	Sir Walter Braithwaite	1865	1945	
19 February 1926	Sir John Du Cane	1865	1947	
1927	Sir Charles Harington	1872	1940	
11 June 1927	Sir William Peyton	1866	1931	
15 June 1927	Sir George Kirkpatrick	1866	1950	
30 January 1928	Sir Robert Whigham	1865	1950	
9 June 1929	Sir Andrew Skeen	1873	1935	Indian Army.
15 October 1929	Sir Robert Cassels	1876	1959	
1930	Sir David Campbell	1869	1936	
1931	Cyril Norman MacMullen	1877	1944	
1 October 1930	Sir Archibald Montgomery-Massingberd	1871	1947	Promoted to field marshal on 7 June 1935.
1 March 1931	Sir William Heneker	1867	1939	
1 March 1931	Sir Cameron Shute	1866	1936	
15 May 1931	Sir Peter Strickland	1869	1951	
22 May 1931	Sir William Thwaites	1868	1947	
30 June 1931	Sir Webb Gillman	1870	1933	
1932	Sir Kenneth Wigram	1875	1949	
1932	Sir Cecil Romer	1869	1962	
21 April 1933	Sir Cyril Deverell	1874	1947	Promoted to field marshal on 15 May 1936.
1933	Sir Alexander Wardrop	1872	1961	
2 July 1934	Sir Torquhil Matheson	1871	1963	
16 July 1934	Sir Felix Ready	1872	1940	
1934	Sir John Burnett-Stuart	1875	1958	
1 January 1935	Edward, Prince of Wales	1894	1972	Field marshal 21 January 1936 as King Edward VIII; later Duke of Windsor
1935	George Jeffreys, 1st Baron Jeffreys	1878	1960	
30 June 1935	Edmund Ironside, 1st Baron Ironside	1880	1959	Promoted to field marshal in 1940.
1936	Sir Archibald Rice Cameron	1870	1944	
1936	Sir Arthur Grenfell Wauchope	1874	1947	
21 January 1936	Prince Albert, Duke of York	1895	1952	Assumed the rank of field marshal on accession as King George VI, 11 December 1936.
1 April 1936	Sir Henry ap Rhys Pryce	1874	1950	Indian Army.
20 April 1936	Sir Walter Kirke	1877	1949	
15 May 1936	Sir Harry Knox	1873	1971	
6 June 1936	Sir John Coleridge	1878	1951	
19 February 1937	Sir William Bartholomew	1877	1962	
1937	Sir Robert Gordon-Finlayson	1881	1956	
1937	Sir George Weir	1876	1951	
15 May 1937	Sir Douglas Baird	1877	1963	
12 October 1937	Sir Charles Bonham-Carter	1876	1955	
5 December 1937	Sir Ivo Vesey	1876	1975	
5 December 1937	Sir Walter Pitt-Taylor	1878	1950	
5 December 1937	Sir Reginald Hildyard	1876	1965	
5 December 1937	Sir Reginald May	1879	1958	
6 December 1937	John Vereker, 6th Viscount Gort	1886	1946	Promoted to field marshal on 1 January 1943.
4 April 1938	Sir Sydney Muspratt	1878	1972	
28 July 1939	Sir Archibald Wavell	1883	1950	Promoted to the local rank of full general (in the Middle East) on 28 July 1939. Promoted to field marshal on 1 January 1943. Became Viscount Wavell in 1942 and Earl Wavell in 1947.
1 October 1939	Sir John Dill	1881	1944	Promoted to full general on 1 October 1939 with seniority backdated to 5 December 1937. Promoted to field marshal on 18 November 1941.

== 1940 to present ==
Promoted	Name	Born	Died	Notes
1940	Sir Roger Wilson	1882	1966	Indian Army
1 July 1940	Sir Walter Venning	1882	1964	
1940	Sir Clement Armitage	1881	1973	
26 December 1940	Sir Claude Auchinleck	1884	1981	Indian Army, promoted to field marshal in 1946
20 July 1940	Sir Alan Brooke	1883	1963	Promoted to acting general on 20 July 1940. Substantive promotion to general on 7 May 1941. Chief of the Imperial General Staff December 1941. Promoted to field marshal on 1 January 1944. Later Viscount Alanbrooke.
27 January 1941	Sir Alan Hartley	1882	1954	Indian Army.
31 May 1941	Sir Henry Wilson	1881	1964	Promoted to full general on 31 May 1941, with seniority backdated to 6 May 1941. Promoted to field marshal on 29 December 1944. later Baron Wilson.
4 July 1941	Sir Mir Usman Ali Khan, Nizam of Hyderabad and Berar	1886	1967	honorary
12 December 1941	Sir George Giffard	1886	1964	
12 April 1942	Sir Ronald Forbes Adam, 2nd Baronet	1885	1982	
1942	Sir Harold Alexander	1891	1969	Promoted to field marshal in 1944; later Viscount then Earl Alexander of Tunis
1942	Sir Bernard Montgomery	1887	1976	promoted to field marshal in 1944; later Viscount Montgomery of Alamein
16 August 1942	Sir Edward Quinan	1885	1960	Indian Army
1 November 1942	Sir Thomas Riddell-Webster	1886	1974	
1943	Sir William Platt	1885	1975	
5 May 1943	Sir Bernard Paget	1887	1961	Acting rank from December 1941. Substantive general from July 1943.
23 July 1943	Harold Franklyn	1885	1963	
1 April 1944	Hastings Ismay, 1st Baron Ismay	1887	1965	Indian Army officer.
1 April 1944	Sir Mosley Mayne	1889	1955	Indian Army
1 April 1944	Sir Henry Finnis	1890	1945	Indian Army
27 October 1944	Prince Henry, Duke of Gloucester	1900	1974	promoted to field marshal in 1955
2 January 1945	Sir Andrew Thorne	1885	1970	
17 April 1945	Sir Richard O'Connor	1889	1981	
15 October 1945	Sir Colville Wemyss	1891	1959	
1 July 1945	William Slim, 1st Viscount Slim	1891	1970	Indian Army. Retired in 1948. Recalled to service and promoted to field marshal in 1949.
30 October 1945	Sir Alan Cunningham	1887	1983	
12 February 1946	Sir Charles Loyd	1891	1973	
17 August 1946	Sir Daril Watson	1888	1967	
1946	[[Sir William Morgan|William Morgan]]	1891	1977	
1946	Sir John Crocker	1896	1963	promoted 6 March 1947 with seniority 2 October 1946
1946	Sir Evelyn Barker	1894	1983	promoted 15 November 1948 with seniority 3 October 1946
23 April 1947	Sir Neil Ritchie	1897	1983	Seniority backdated to 9 October 1946.
19 August 1947	Sir Philip Christison	1893	1993	Promoted to full general on 19 August 1947 with seniority backdated to 29 September 1946.
1947	Sir Sidney Kirkman	1895	1982	
1947	Sir James Steele	1894	1975	
1947	Sir Rob Lockhart	1893	1981	Indian Army. First Commander-in-Chief of the Indian Army after partition
1947	Brian Robertson, 1st Baron Robertson of Oakridge	1896	1974	
1947	Sir Frank Messervy	1893	1974	Indian Army. Commander-in-Chief of the Pakistan Army with rank of Acting General 15 August 1947. Honorary General 1948
6 July 1949	Sir Ivor Thomas	1893	1972	
1949	[[MacCreery, Richard Sir Richard McCreery]]	1898	1967	
1949	John Harding, 1st Baron Harding of Petherton	1896	1989	Promoted to field marshal in 1953.
1949	Roy	1895	1980	honorary (ex-Indian Army)
1949	Sir Kenneth Anderson	1891	1959	
12 March 1950	King Farouk of Egypt	1920	1965	honorary
1950	Sir Gerald Templer	1898	1979	promoted to field marshal in 1956
20 October 1950	Sir Ouvry Roberts	1898	1986	
29 April 1951	Sir Douglas Gracey	1894	1964	Indian Army. C-in-C Pakistan Army 1948-1951. Promoted to honorary full general on retirement.
1951	Sir Charles Keightley	1901	1974	
5 February 1952	Sir Kenneth Crawford	1895	1961	
1952	Sir Cameron Nicholson	1898	1979	
5 June 1952	Sir Richard Gale	1896	1982	
1 July 1952	King Tribhuvan of Nepal	1906	1955	honorary
1953	Sir Robert Mansergh	1900	1970	temporary rank, 1 April 1953; substantive, 29 September 1953
1953	Sir Nevil Brownjohn	1897	1973	
1 January 1954	Sir Gordon Holmes Alexander MacMillan	1897	1986	
16 April 1954	Sir Charles Loewen	1900	1986	
1955	Sir Lashmer Whistler	1898	1963	
23 September 1955	King Mahendra of Nepal	1920	1972	honorary; promoted to field marshal on 17 October 1960.
23 November 1956	Princess Mary, Princess Royal	1897	1965	honorary
1956	Sir Francis Festing	1902	1976	Promoted to field marshal in 1960.
1957	Sir Dudley Ward	1905	1991	
1957	Geoffrey Bourne, Baron Bourne	1902	1982	
1957	Sir Hugh Stockwell	1903	1986	
1957	Sir John Whiteley	1896	1970	
29 November 1958	Sir Cecil Sugden	1903	1963	Master-General of the Ordnance
29 November 1958	Sir James Cassels	1907	1996	Later promoted to field marshal.
1959	Sir Richard Hull	1907	1989	Promoted to field marshal in 1965.
10 November 1959	Sir Horatius Murray	1903	1989	
29 April 1960	Sir Gerald Lathbury	1906	1978	
22 September 1960	Sir Richard Goodbody	1903	1981	
1963	Sir William Stirling	1907	1973	local rank 1 April and substantive rank 29 June 1963
26 October 1964	Sir Reginald Hewetson	1908	1993	Promoted to the local rank (Ministry of Defence) of full general on 26 October 1964.
1965	Sir John D'Arcy Anderson	1908	1988	
1965	Sir Charles Richardson	1908	1994	
1965	Sir Robert Bray	1908	1983	
1965	Sir John Hackett	1910	1997	
9 January 1967	Sir Alan Jolly	1910	1977	
1967	Sir Kenneth Darling	1909	1998	
1967	Sir Geoffrey Baker	1912	1980	promoted to field marshal in 1971
1968	Sir Geoffrey Musson	1910	2008	local rank, 30 October 1967; substantive, 9 March 1968
29 March 1968	Sir Michael Carver	1915	2001	Promoted to field marshal on 18 July 1973.
1968	Sir Charles Harington	1910	2007	
1968	Sir Desmond Fitzpatrick	1912	2002	
1969	Sir Walter Walker	1912	2001	
29 September 1969	Sir Antony Read	1913	2000	Promoted to general (local rank) on 29 September 1969. Substantive rank 11 November 1969.
27 October 1969	Sir John Mogg	1913	2001	
1970	Sir Peter Hunt	1916	1988	
22 February 1971	Sir Basil Eugster	1914	1984	Appointed General Officer Commanding-in-Chief Southern Command with the local rank of general on 22 February 1971. Then promoted to general on 6 April 1971 with seniority backdated to 22 February 1971.
9 March 1971	Sir Noel Thomas	1915	1983	Promoted to the local rank of general (at the Ministry of Defence) 9 March 1971. Master-General of the Ordnance
1972	Sir Thomas Pearson	1914	2019	
14 January 1972	Sir Mervyn Butler	1913	1976	
19 January 1973	Sir William Jackson	1917	1999	Promoted to general (local rank at the Ministry of Defence) on 19 January 1973.
1973	Sir Cecil Blacker	1916	2002	local rank, 18 June 1973; substantive, 19 June, with seniority 18 April 1973
1973	Sir Harry Tuzo	1917	1998	C-in-C British Army of the Rhine with local rank as general, 20 April 1973, before promotion to substantive general on 31 July 1973.
28 August 1973	King Birendra of Nepal	1945	2001	honorary; promoted to honorary field marshal on 18 November 1980.
1973	Sir John Sharp	1917	1977	promoted 18 September 1974 with seniority 24 April 1973
18 March 1974	Sir John Gibbon	1917	1997	Seniority backdated to 10 August 1973. Master-General of the Ordnance
1 April 1974	Sir Roland Gibbs	1921	2004	Promoted to field marshal on 13 July 1979.
30 October 1975	Sir David Fraser	1920	2012	
1976	Sir Frank King	1919	1998	
1976	Sir Jack Harman	1920	2009	
25 June 1976	Sir Edwin Bramall	1923	2019	Substantive promotion to general on 25 June 1976 with seniority backdated to 15 May 1976. Promoted to field marshal on 1 January 1982. Later Baron Bramall.
31 January 1977	Sir Patrick Howard-Dobson	1921	2009	Promoted to full general on 31 January 1977 with seniority backdated to 1 April 1976.
1977	Sir Hugh Beach	1923	2019	Master-General of the Ordnance
1978	Sir John Archer	1924	1999	
1978	Sir William Scotter	1922	1981	
1 September 1978	Sir Robert Ford	1923	2015	Promoted to the local rank of general (Ministry of Defence) on 1 September 1978. Promoted to the substantive rank of general on 2 November 1978 with seniority backdated to 1 May 1978.
1 March 1979	Sir Richard Worsley	1923	2013	Promoted to full general (local rank at the Ministry of Defence) on 1 March 1979. Permanent promotion on 13 July 1979 with seniority backdated to 1 March 1979.
1979	Sir Anthony Farrar-Hockley	1924	2006	
1980	Sir Timothy Creasey	1923	1986	
1981	Sir Michael Gow	1924	2013	local rank, 25 October 1980; substantive 6 February 1981
1 January 1981	Sir John Stanier	1925	2007	Promoted to field marshal on 10 July 1985.
1981	Sir Peter Leng	1925	2009	promoted 21 March 1981 with seniority 1 February 1981 Master-General of the Ordnance
1981	Sir George Cooper	1925	2020	
1982	Sir Richard Lawson	1927	2023	
1982	Sir Frank Kitson	1926	2024	
1982	Sir Nigel Bagnall	1927	2002	promoted to field marshal in 1988
5 September 1983	Sir Richard Trant	1928	2007	Promoted to the local rank of general (at the Ministry of Defence) on 5 September 1983.
1983	Sir Thomas Morony	1927	1989	
28 April 1984	Sir Roland Guy	1928	2005	Seniority backdated to 1 September 1983.
1983	Sir Edward Burgess	1927	2015	promoted 16 July 1984 with seniority 15 September 1983
23 February 1984	Sultan Hassanal Bolkiah of Brunei	1946		honorary
1 June 1985	Sir James Glover	1929	2000	Granted local rank (United Kingdom) of full general on 1 June 1985. Substantive promotion on 29 June 1985.
26 July 1985	Sir Martin Farndale	1929	2000	
10 February 1986	Sir Geoffrey Howlett	1930	2022	
3 November 1986	Sir Richard Vincent	1931	2018	Promoted to field marshal on 2 April 1991. Later Baron Vincent of Coleshill.
1986	Sir David Mostyn	1928	2007	local rank, 13 December 1986; substantive rank 10 January 1987, with seniority 8 February 1986
1987	Sir John Akehurst	1930	2007	
29 June 1987	Sir John Chapple	1931	2022	Promoted to field marshal on 14 February 1992.
22 October 1987	Sir Charles Huxtable	1931	2018	
2 November 1987	Sir Brian Kenny	1934	2017	
1988	Sir Robert Pascoe	1932		
9 September 1988	Sir John Stibbon	1935	2014	Master-General of the Ordnance
Template:Dts	Template:SortSir Patrick Palmer	1933	1999	Promotion to full general on 24 April 1989 with seniority backdated to 15 August 1988.
Template:Dts	Template:SortSir Peter Inge	1935	2022	Promoted to the local rank of full general (in Germany) on 27 November 1989. Promoted to substantive full general on 3 January 1990. Promoted to field marshal on 15 March 1994. Later Baron Inge.
Template:Dts	Template:SortSir John Waters	1935	2025	
1990	Template:SortDavid Ramsbotham, Baron Ramsbotham	1934	2022	Local rank awarded in 1990. Substantively promoted 1991 with seniority backdated to 1990.
1991	Template:SortSir Peter de la Billière	1934		
1992	Template:SortSir John Learmont	1934		local rank 2 December 1991; substantive rank 14 January with seniority 13 January 1992
1992	Template:SortCharles Guthrie, Baron Guthrie of Craigiebank	1938	2025	promoted to field marshal in 2012
1992	Template:SortSir Garry Johnson	1937		acting rank 14 April 1992; substantive rank 27 July with seniority 1 June 1992
1992	Template:SortSir Edward Jones	1936	2007	
Template:Dts	Template:SortSir John Wilsey,	1939	2019	active rank, 1 March 1993, substantive 11 July 1993 with seniority from the earlier date
Template:Dts	Template:SortSir Michael John Wilkes	1940	2013	active rank, 17 May 1993, substantive 13 July 1993 with seniority from the earlier date
1994	Template:SortSir Jeremy Blacker	1939	2005	local rank, 18 April 1994; substantive, 13 June 1994
Template:Dts	Template:SortKing Harald V of Norway	1937	2026	honorary
1994	Template:SortSir Jeremy Mackenzie	1941		acting rank, 8 December 1994; substantive 22 March 1995 with seniority 8 December 1994
Template:Dts	Template:SortGrand Duke Jean of Luxembourg	1921	2019	honorary
Template:Dts	Template:SortSir Michael Rose	1940		
1996	Template:SortSir Roger Wheeler	1941		
1997	Template:Sortname	1944		
Template:Dts	Template:SortSir Alexander Harley	1941		Acting promotion on 2 June 1997. Substantive promotion on 1 September 1997 with seniority of the same date.
Template:Dts	Template:SortSir Samuel Cowan	1941		
Template:Dts	Template:SortSir Rupert Smith	1943		Acting general from 1998. Substantive general from 1 January 1999.
Template:Dts	Template:SortSir Mike Jackson	1944	2024	
Template:Dts	Template:SortSir Timothy Granville-Chapman	1947		
Template:Dts	Template:SortSir John Reith	1948		Substantive promotion to general on 1 October 2004.
Template:Dts	Template:SortSir Kevin O'Donoghue	1947		Previously local general (date unknown)
2005	Template:SortRichard Dannatt, Baron Dannatt	1950		
2006	Template:SortPrince Charles, Prince of Wales	1948		promoted to field marshal in 2012
Template:Dts	Template:SortSir Redmond Watt	1950		
2008	Template:SortSir David Richards	1952		promoted to field marshal in 2025
2009	Template:SortSir Nick Houghton	1954		promoted to field marshal in 2025
2009	Template:Sortname	1955		
Template:Dts	Template:SortSir Nick Parker	1954		
Template:Dts	Template:SortSir Richard Shirreff	1955		
Template:Dts	Template:Sortname	1958		
Template:Dts	Template:Sortname	1959		
Template:Dts	Template:Sortname	1960		
Template:Dts	Template:Sortname	1962		
Template:Dts	Sir Mark Carleton-Smith	1964		
Template:Dts	Sir Patrick Sanders	1966		
Template:Dts	Template:SortSir Timothy Buchan Radford	1963		
Template:Dts	Template:SortPrincess Anne, Princess Royal	1950		
Template:Dts	Template:SortSir James Hockenhull	1964		
Template:Dts	Template:SortDame Sharon Nesmith	1970		First female serving officer to be promoted to general
Template:Dts	Template:SortSir Roland Walker	1970		
Template:Dts	Template:SortNick Perry	1972		

== See also ==
- List of British generals and brigadiers (covers all ranks from brigadier (and brigadier-general) to field marshal)
- List of Royal Marines full generals (the equivalent ranked officers in the Royal Marines)
- List of field marshals of the British Army
- List of Royal Air Force air chief marshals (the equivalent ranked officers in the RAF)
- List of Royal Navy admirals (the equivalent ranked officers in the RN)

== Notes ==
Template:Notelist
