= Whinyates =

Whinyates is a surname. Notable people with the surname include:

- General Sir Edward Charles Whinyates (1782–1865), British Army artillery officer
- General Francis Frankland Whinyates (1796–1887), British Army officer who served in India
- Seymour Whinyates (1895–1978), British violinist, leader of the Whinyates String Quartet
