= George Whichcote =

General George Whichcote (1794 – 26 August 1891) was a senior officer in the British Army.

He was born the fourth son of Thomas Whichcote, 5th Baronet of Aswarby Park, Lincolnshire. After attending Rugby School he enlisted as a volunteer in the 52nd (Oxfordshire) Regiment of Foot and received a commission as an ensign in 1811.

That same year he sailed on HMS Pompee to join the British army in the Spanish peninsula, where his regiment, together with the 43rd and the 95th regiments, formed the Light Division. After taking part in the Battle of Sabugal in April and in the Battle of El Bodón in September he assisted in the siege of Ciudad Rodrigo and the Battle of Badajoz in 1812. Made a lieutenant in July he was present at the battles of Battle of Salamanca and Vittoria, where the 52nd carried the village of Magarita. He took part with his regiment in the combats in the Pyrenees in July and August, the Battle of Vera in October, the Battle of Nivelle in November, the Battle of the Nive in December, the Battle of Orthes in February, 1814 and the fighting at Tarbes in March. At the final Battle of Toulouse in April, he was the first man in the British army to enter the town when, having observed the French retreat when in command of an advanced picket, he pressed on to take possession of the town. At the end of the war the regiment was put on garrison duty at Castelsarrasin on the Garonne, and afterwards was sent to Ireland.

Whichcote then took part in the Battle of Waterloo, where the 52nd completed the rout of the Imperial Guard. When the 52nd was afterwards ordered to Botany Bay, Whichcote exchanged into the Buffs. In 1818 he was promoted captain, and in 1822 exchanged into the 4th Dragoon Guards, where was made major in 1825, lieutenant-colonel in 1838, and colonel in 1851. In 1825 he was placed on half-pay and made major-general, promoted to lieutenant-general in 1864, and full general on 5 December 1871.

He died on 26 August 1891 at Meriden, near Coventry, where he had resided since retiring from active service, and was buried in St Laurence's churchyard there on 31 August, one of the two surviving officers of the English army who had been present at Waterloo. In 1842 he had married Charlotte Sophia, the daughter of Philip Monckton. They had no children.

== See also ==
- List of British Army full generals
