= Mangles James Brander =

- Born: 1828
- Died: 11 January 1903 (aged 74–75); Tunbridge Wells
- Military career
- Allegiance: United Kingdom
- Branch: British Indian Army
- Rank: General
- Unit: Bengal Army

General Mangles James Brander (1828– 11 January 1903) was a senior officer in the British Indian Army.

== Biography ==
Brander was born in 1828, the son of Dr. James Mainwaring Brander and Constantia (nee Dickinson).

He joined the Bengal Army, and served in the Second Anglo-Burmese War 1852–53, where he was present in operations which resulted in the capture of Rangoon. As a captain, he served during the Indian Rebellion of 1857, taking part in the recapture of Goruckpore, the capture of the Fort of Julapore, and the siege and capture of Lucknow. For his service in this campaign, he was twice mentioned in despatches, and received a brevet promotion to the rank of major. He also served in the Second Anglo-Afghan War 1878–1880.

Macbean was promoted full general on 1 April 1894, one of a large group of Indian Staff officers so promoted on the supernumerary list.

He died at Tunbridge Wells on 11 January 1903.

== Family ==
Brander married, in 1848, Ellen Eteson, daughter of Rev. R. Eteson. She died in 1901.
