= David Montolieu, Baron de St Hippolyte =

General David (de) Montolieu, Baron de St Hippolyte (1669 – 9 June 1761) was a French Huguenot officer in the British service. He came to England as refugee with William, Prince of Orange in 1688, and entered the army. For his services in Piedmont against France, Montolieu de Saint-Hippolyte was created a Baron of the Holy Roman Empire (Reichsfreiherr) by Emperor Joseph I, by letters patent dated at Vienna, 14 February 1706.

His male issue became extinct on the death s.p.m.s. of his grandson Louis Montolieu, seigneur de Saint-Hippolyte, 3rd Baron, 20 May 1817. The heir of the line of the Barons de St Hippolyte was in 1910 his great-granddaughter Constance Maria, née Hammersley, widow of Lieut.-Colonel Henry Edward Stopford (though Lord Elibank was often erroneously stated to be the heir).
