= William Robert Houghton =

William Robert Houghton was an American writer, best known for Two Boys in the Civil War and After (1912), which he co-wrote with his younger brother, Mitchell Bennett Houghton.

== Biography ==
William Robert Houghton was born in 1842 in Heard County, Georgia. His father, William Henry Houghton, practiced law, but moved to Alabama in the run-up to the American Civil War. Houghton enlisted in the Confederate Army; he joined the Columbus Guards and served with the Second Georgia Regiment. He saw combat in Virginia and Tennessee and was wounded during the Battle of Malvern Hill, and again at the Second Battle of Bull Run. After the war was over, he studied law, passed the bar in 1866, and started a practice in Hayneville, Alabama. He married Anna Streety in 1875; they had a son, Harry. His wife died in 1882, and five years later he moved to Birmingham, where he died in 1906.

His younger brother, Mitchell Bennett, was born in 1844 or 1845, attended Dover Academy, and signed up with the Glenville Guards of Barbour County, which became attached to the Fifteenth Alabama regiment. He also fought at the Second Battle of Bull Run and was in Stonewall Jackson's Shenandoah Valley campaign. He moved to Montgomery and started a career in business and banking after the war ended.

The brothers wrote their war memoirs together: Two Boys in the Civil War and After was published in 1911 by a Montgomery publisher, after William's death. Much of the content is William's, including many recollections and reflections of the war, and of life in the South after the war.

== Bibliography ==
- Two Boys in the Civil War and After (Montgomery: Paragon Press, 1912)
