= Spencer Westmacott =

New Zealand farmer and memoirist (1885–1960)

Herbert Horatio Spencer Westmacott (10 November 1885 – 26 January 1960) was a notable New Zealand farmer, soldier and memoirist. He was born in Christchurch, New Zealand in 1885.
