= Æneas Perkins =

British military person (1834–1901)

Sir Æneas Perkins, KCB (19 May 1834 – 22 December 1901) was a Bengal Army and British Army officer.

== Biography ==
Born at Lewisham, Kent, on 19 May 1834, Perkins was sixth son in a family of thirteen children of Charles Perkins, merchant, of London, by his wife Jane Homby, daughter of Charles William Barkley (b. 1759), after whom Barkley Sound and Barkley Island in the Pacific are named. His grandfather was John Perkins of Camberwell, a partner in Barclay & Perkins's Brewery. A brother George, in the Bengal artillery, was killed at the battle of the Hindun before Delhi in 1857.

Educated at Dr. Prendergast's school at Lewisham and at Stoton and Mayor's school at Wimbledon, where Frederick (afterwards Earl) Roberts, his lifelong friend, was his schoolfellow, Æneas entered the Addiscombe Military Seminary of the East India Company on 1 February 1850, in the same batch as Roberts. At Addiscombe he showed ability in mathematics, and was a leader in all sports. Obtaining a commission as second lieutenant in the Bengal Engineers on 12 December 1851, he, after professional instruction at Chatham, arrived at Fort William, Calcutta, on 16 January 1854.

As assistant engineer in the public works department Perkins was soon employed on irrigation work on the Bari Doab Canal in the Punjab. Promoted first lieutenant on 17 August 1856, he was transferred in November to the Arabala division, and in the following May, when the Indian Mutiny began, joined the force under General George Anson, commander-in-chief in India, which marched to the relief of Delhi. Perkins was present at the Battle of Badli-ki-Serai on 8 June, and at the subsequent seizure of the Delhi Ridge. He did much good work during the early part of the siege. On 11-12 June he was employed in the construction of a mortar battery, known as 'Perkins's Battery'; on the 17th he took part in the destruction of a rebel battery and the capture of its guns; and on 14 July in the repulse of the sortie; but, wounded a few days later near the walls of Delhi, he was sent to Ambala. Although he soon recovered from the actual wound, he was forced by broken health to remain there until March 1858, when he was invalided home. For his services in the Mutiny campaign he received the medal and clasp.

On returning to India in 1859, Perkins held various offices in Bengal, including those of assistant principal of the Civil Engineering College at Calcutta, assistant consulting engineer for the railways, and executive engineer of the Berhampur Division. On 12 March 1862 he was promoted second captain and in the autumn of 1864 took part as field engineer in the Bhutan Expedition, during which he was three times mentioned in despatches for gallant conduct, and was recommended for a brevet majority. Towards the end of the expedition he was appointed chief engineer of the force. A strong recommendation for the Victoria Cross for conspicuous gallantry in storming a stockade at the summit of the Baru Pass was rejected on account of the delay in sending it in. For his services in Bhutan, Perkins received the medal and a brevet majority on 30 June 1865.

Perkins was next stationed at Morshedabad as executive engineer, and in 1866 was transferred to the Darjeeling division in the same grade. Promoted first captain in his corps on 31 Oct. 1868, two years later he was sent to the North West provinces his superintending engineer, and in April 1872 he was transferred in the same grade to the military works branch. He became regimental major on 5 July 1872, brevet lieutenant-colonel 29 December 1874, and regimental lieutenant-colonel on 1 October 1877.

=== Second Anglo-Afghan War ===
A year later Perkins was selected for active service in Afghanistan at the request of Major-General (afterwards Field-marshal Earl) Roberts, commanding the Kuram field force. He was appointed commanding royal engineer of that force. During the operations in front of the Peiwar Kotal he skilfully reconnoitred the enemy's position, and selected a site from which the mountain battery could shell the Afghan camp.

The works carried on under his control in the Kuram Valley greatly facilitated the subsequent advance on Kabvd. He was mentioned in despatches, and was created a C.B. in 1879. On the conclusion of peace with Sirdar Yakub Khan, Perkins remained in the Kuram Valley, laying out a cantonment proposed to be formed at Shalofzan, but on the news of the massacre of Sir Louis Cavagnari and his escort at Kabul an immediate advance was made by the Kuram column, and Perkins was present at the victory of Charasiab and the entry into Kabul on 8 Oct. 1879. He was again mentioned in despatches.

The work which then devolved upon the engineers was extremely heavy. The Sherpur cantonment and Bala Hissar had to be repaired, and a new line of communication with India via Jalalabad had to be opened out. The Sherpur cantonment was rendered defensible by the beginning of December and none too soon. A few days later the Afghans assembled in such overwhelming numbers that Sir Frederick Roberts had to assemble the whole of his force within the walls of Sherpur. Under Perkins's direction emplacements and abattis were rapidly constructed, block-houses were built on the Bimaru heights, walls and villages dangerously near the cantonment were blown down and levelled, and a second line of defence within the enclosure was improvised. On 23 Dec. the enemy delivered their assault in great numbers. It was repulsed, and a counter attack dispersed the Afghans to their homes. Perkins was mentioned in despatches and promoted brevet colonel on 29 December 1879.

Steps were now taken by Perkins to render the position at Kabul absolutely secure. A fort and blockhouse were erected on Siah Sang, the Bala Hissar and the Asmai Heights were fortified, Sherpur was converted into a strongly entrenched camp, bridges were thrown across the Kabul river, the main roads were made passable for artillery, and many new roads were laid out. The works completed during the next seven months, chiefly by means of unskilled Afghan labour, comprised ten forts, fifteen detached posts, three large and several small bridges, 4000 yards of loopholed parapet, 45 miles of road, and quarters for 8000 men. At the end of July 1880 the news of the Maiwand disaster reached Kabul, and Perkins accompanied Sir Frederick Roberts as commanding royal engineer with the picked force of 10,000 men in the famous march to Kandahar. He was present at the battle of Kandahar on 1 September 1880 and soon afterwards returned to India. He received the medal with four clasps and bronze decoration, and was made an aide-de-camp to the Queen.

=== Later life and career ===
Rejoining the military works department, Perkins was appointed superintending engineer at Rawalpindi, and from April to July 1881 he officiated as inspector-general of military works. After a furlough lasting two years, Perkins was appointed chief engineer of the Central Provinces, was transferred in the same capacity in April 1886 to the Punjab, and on 10 March 1887 was promoted major-general. In May 1889 he vacated his appointment in the military works department on attaining the age of fifty-five years, and in 1890 was selected by Lord Roberts, then commander-in-chief in India, to command the Oudh division; but this command was cut short by his promotion to lieutenant-general on 1 April 1891, and he returned to England. Promoted to be general on 1 April 1895, and made a colonel commandant, Royal Engineers on the same date, he was two years later created K.C.B. He died in London on 22 December 1901, and was buried at Brookwood cemetery. Lord Roberts wrote of him with admiring affection, crediting him with 'quick perception, unflagging energy, sound judgment, tenacity of purpose and indomitable pluck.'

== Family ==
Perkins married in 1863 Janette Wilhelmina (who survived him), daughter of Werner Cathray, formerly 13th light dragoons, by whom he left two sons—Major Arthur Ernest John Perkins, R.A., and Major Æneas Charles Perkins, 40th Pathans, and three daughters.
