= Francis Frankland Whinyates =

British army general

General Francis Frankland Whinyates (30 June 1796 – 22 January 1887) was a British Army general of the 19th century.

Whinyates entered the East India Company's service at the age of sixteen, and was gazetted as lieutenant-fireworker in the Madras artillery in July 1813. After serving in Ceylon and against the Pindáris, he took part in the Mahratta war of 1817–19 as a subaltern in A troop horse artillery, and received the medal with clasp for Maheidpoor (21 Dec. 1817). Promoted captain on 24 Oct. 1824, he served at the siege of Kittoor at the end of that year. He was principal commissary of ordnance from 1845 to 1850, and then had command of the horse artillery, and of the Madras artillery as brigadier. He left India in 1854, having ‘filled, with the highest credit to himself, every appointment and command connected with his corps’ (general order, 10 Feb. 1854). He became major-general on 28 Nov. 1854, lieutenant-general on 14 July 1867, and general on 21 Jan. 1872. He died without issue at Bath on 22 January 1887. On 7 Aug. 1826 he had married Elizabeth, daughter of John Campbell of Ormidale, Argyllshire.

He had five brothers, of whom four served with distinction in the army and navy.
