= Charles Rochfort Scott =

British Army general

Major-General Charles Rochfort Scott
- Born: 8 February 1797; Newcastle upon Tyne, England
- Died: 4 July 1872 (aged 75); Cheltenham, Gloucestershire, England
- Military career
- Allegiance: United Kingdom
- Branch: British Army
- Rank: Major-General

Major-General Charles Rochfort Scott (8 February 1797 – 4 July 1872) was a British Army officer who became Lieutenant Governor of Guernsey.

== Military career ==
Rochfort Scott was commissioned into the Royal Staff Corps where he remained until 1834 when he transferred to the 81st Regiment of Foot. It was in that year that he visited the Labyrinth of Messara at Gortyn in Crete and recorded his impressions. He spent most of 1840 and 1841 surveying parts of Syria; in January 1842 he was transferred to Gibraltar and in 1845 to Wales but throughout that time was still completing his maps of Syria. He was appointed Assistant Quartermaster-General in Dublin in 1849 but by 1854 he was Assistant Quartermaster-General for the Northern District and in 1857 he was appointed Lieutenant Governor of the Royal Military College, Sandhurst.

He was appointed Lieutenant Governor of Guernsey in 1864. He was also Colonel of the 100th Regiment of Foot.

== Works ==
- C. Rochfort Scott, Rambles in Egypt and Candia, Henry Colburn, London 1837
- C. Rochfort Scott, Excursions in the Mountains of Ronda And Granada, London 1838
- C. Rochfort Scott and Basil Jackson, The Military Life of Field Marshal, the Duke of Wellington, KG, Longman, Orme, Brown, Green and Longmans, London 1840
- C. Rochfort Scott, Map of Syria, constructed from the surveys and sketches of the under mentioned officers in that country in 1840 and 1841 by Major C. Rochfort Scott, Royal Staff Corps, under whose general direction the work was undertaken, Major F. H. Robe, 87th Fusiliers and R. Wilbraham, 7th Fusiliers, and Lieut. J. F. A. Symonds Royal Engineers, London 1846

Military offices
Preceded by George Walter Prosser	Lieutenant-Governor of the Royal Military College; 1857–1864	Succeeded by Edward Gilling Hallewell (as Commandant)
Government offices
Preceded by Marcus Slade	Lieutenant Governor of Guernsey; 1864–1869	Succeeded by Edward Frome
