= Mike Griffiths (British Army officer) =

Brigadier Mike Griffiths CBE QPM
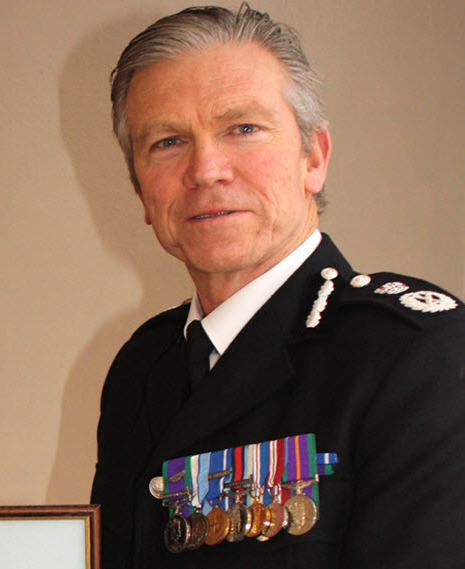
- Occupation: Police Officer
- Known for
- Military career
- Allegiance: United Kingdom
- Branch: British Army
- Service years: 1979 – 2012
- Rank: Brigadier
- Unit: King's Own Royal Border Regiment
- Commands: 42nd (North West) Brigade; King's Own Royal Border Regiment
- Conflicts: Northern Ireland; War In Afghanistan
- Awards: Commander of the Order of the British Empire

Michael Trevor Griffiths CBE QPM is a retired British police officer who served as Chief Constable and Chief Executive of the Civil Nuclear Constabulary from 2013 until 2019; prior to this, he was an officer of the British Army who retired as a Brigadier.

== Early life and education ==
Griffiths spent part of his childhood in Carlisle and started his military career as a cadet in the Keswick detachment of Cumbria Army Cadet Force. He studied at the University of Southampton and graduated in politics and international studies.

== Military career ==
Having attended the Royal Military Academy Sandhurst, Griffiths was commissioned into the General List of the British Army as a second lieutenant on 5 August 1978. He transferred to the King's Own Royal Border Regiment on 3 March 1979, He was promoted to captain on 5 February 1985, to major on 30 September 1991, and to lieutenant colonel on 30 June 1998. He eventually rose to become commanding officer of the King's Own Royal Border Regiment.

Griffiths was Commander of the 42 North West Brigade from 2006 to 2008. He was promoted to brigadier on 30 June 2007. He then served in staff roles such as Director Personal Services (Army), Director Infantry and Director Personnel Operations. Having seen deployments to Northern Ireland, Cyprus, Bosnia and Afghanistan, he retired from the British Army in 2012.

== Civil Nuclear Constabulary ==
In October 2012, he succeeded John Sampson, who was the acting chief constable, as Chief Constable and Chief Executive of the Civil Nuclear Constabulary. He was appointed by the chairman of the Civil Nuclear Police Authority, Philip Trousdell.

== Honours and awards ==

In November 1995, Griffiths was awarded the Queen's Commendation for Valuable Service "in recognition of gallant and distinguished service in Northern Ireland during the period 1st October 1994 to 31st March 1995". He was appointed Commander of the Order of the British Empire (CBE) in the 2011 New Year Honours for his work as Director Personal Services (Army).

Griffiths was awarded the Queen's Police Medal (QPM) in the 2019 Birthday Honours in recognition of his work as Chief Constable of the Civil Nuclear Constabulary.

Police appointments
| Preceded by John Sampson (acting) | Chief Constable of the Civil Nuclear Constabulary; 2013–2019 | Succeeded by Simon Chesterman QPM |
