= List of nuclear fuel carrier ships =

The maritime transportation of spent nuclear fuel and other high-level radioactive wastes requires the use of purpose-built vessels which meet the International Maritime Organization's INF classification standards. These standards were introduced in 1993 and made mandatory in 2001. As of 2020, the list below is limited to active vessels and may not be exhaustive.

Vessels in service
| Vessel | Flag | Owner | Year built | Gross tonnage | Flask capacity | Length overall (m) | Breadth extreme (m) | Draft (m) | Speed in knots (Max) | Speed in knots (Average) | References |
|---|---|---|---|---|---|---|---|---|---|---|---|
| Imandra | (Russia) Russian Federation | Rosatomflot | 1980 | 5806 | | 130.5 | 17.3 | 6.8 | 10.4 | 7.5 | |
| Kaiei Maru | Japan | Nuclear Fuel Transport Co. Ltd. | 2006 | 4924 | | 100 | 16.5 | 5.1 | 14.7 | 14.1 | |
| Oceanic Pintail | United Kingdom | Nuclear Decommissioning | 1987 | 5271 | | 103.92 | 16.62 | 5 | 9.7 | 8.1 | |
| Pacific Egret | United Kingdom | Pacific Nuclear Transport Ltd. | 2010 | 6776 | 20-24 | 104 | 17.3 | 5.5 | 12.6 | 8 | |
| Pacific Grebe | United Kingdom | Pacific Nuclear Transport Ltd. | 2010 | 6840 | 20-24 | 104 | 17.3 | 6 | 12.3 | 8.3 | |
| Pacific Heron | United Kingdom | Pacific Nuclear Transport Ltd. | 2008 | 6776 | 20-24 | 104 | 17.3 | 5.5 | 10.9 | 8.5 | |
| Rokuei Maru | Japan | Nuclear Fuel Transport Co. Ltd. | 1996 | 4913 | | 100 | 16.5 | 5.5 | 14 | 12.8 | |
| Rossita | (Russia) Russian Federation | Rosatomflot | 2011 | 2557 | | 84 | 14 | 4.1 | 10 | 8.1 | |
| Seiei Maru | Japan | Nuclear Fuel Transport Co. Ltd. | 2019 | 4568 | | 99.9 | 16 | 4.2 | 12.3 | 10.6 | |
| Serebryanka | (Russia) Russian Federation | Rosatomflot | 1974 | 2925 | | 102 | 15.03 | 3.9 | 8.2 | 7.4 | |
| Sigrid | Sweden | SKB | 2013 | 6694 | 12 | 99.5 | 18.6 | 4.4 | 13.4 | 9.1 | |
| Tien Kuang No.1 | Taiwan / People's Republic of China | Taiwan Power Co. | 1991 | 834 | | 53 | 10.74 | | | | |
| Xin An Ji Xiang | People's Republic of China | China National Nuclear Corporation | 2020 | | | 96 | 19 | 4 | 6.8 | 5.8 | Speeds are based on early voyage data from MarineTraffic.com |
