= General Ritchie (disambiguation) =

Neil Ritchie (1897–1983) was a British Army general. General Ritchie may also refer to:

- Andrew Ritchie (British Army officer) (born 1953), British Army major general
- Archibald Ritchie (British Army officer) (1869–1955), British Army major general
- Richard Stephen Ritchie (born 1942), U.S. Air Force brigadier general
