= PNTL =

PNTL may refer to:

- Policia Nacional de Timor-Leste (PNTL), the National Police of Timor-Leste
- PNTL FC, a police football club come from Dili, Timor-Leste
- Pacific Nuclear Transport Limited, a shipping company specialising in the transport of nuclear material between Europe and Japan
- Playing Not To Lose (PNTL)
