= Heddlu =

Heddlu is the Welsh-language word for police and may refer to:

== Wales ==
- Dyfed–Powys Police (Heddlu Dyfed Powys)
- Gwent Police (Heddlu Gwent)
- North Wales Police (Heddlu Gogledd Cymru)
- South Wales Police (Heddlu De Cymru)

== United Kingdom ==
- British Transport Police (Heddlu Trafnidiaeth Prydeinig)
- Civil Nuclear Constabulary (Heddlu Sifil Niwclear), responsible for providing security at nuclear sites and during transportation of nuclear materials in the UK
