= George Prosser =

George Prosser may refer to:

- George Henry Prosser (1867–1941), businessman and politician in South Australia
- George Walter Prosser, British Army officer
