= General Butler =

General Butler may refer to:

- Arthur H. Butler (1903–1972), U.S. Marine Corps major general
- Benjamin Butler (1818-1893), American lawyer, major general during the American Civil War and later politician
- Benjamin Franklin Butler (lawyer) (1795-1858), lawyer, legislator and Attorney General of the United States
- Charles Butler, 1st Earl of Arran (1671-1758), Irish lieutenant general
- David Butler (general) (1928–2020), Australian Army major general
- Frederic B. Butler (1896–1987), U.S. Army brigadier general
- General Butler (ship), a sailing canal schooner that sank in Burlington Bay, Vermont, in 1876
- George Lee Butler (born 1939), commander in chief, United States Strategic Command, and the last commander of Strategic Air Command
- Hew Butler (1922–2007), British Army major general
- James Butler (British Army officer) (died 1836), British Army lieutenant general
- James Butler, 1st Duke of Ormond (1610–1688), Confederate Irish lieutenant general
- James Butler, 2nd Duke of Ormonde (1665–1745), British Army general
- John Butler (general) (c. 1728–1786), North Carolina Militia brigadier general during the American Revolutionary War
- John G. Butler (inventor) (1842–1914), U.S. Army brigadier general
- Lesley James Probyn Butler (1876–1955), British Army brigadier general
- Matthew Calbraith Butler (1836-1909) Confederate States Army general in the American Civil War U.S. Army general in the Spanish–American War
- Mervyn Butler (1913–1976), British Army general
- Pierce Butler, 4th Viscount Ikerrin (c.1677–1711), Irish soldier who became a brigadier general under Queen Anne
- Richard Butler (general) (1743-1791), American general during the Revolutionary War
- Richard Butler (British Army officer) (1870-1935), British Lieutenant-General during the First World War
- Richard Butler, 3rd Viscount Mountgarret (1578–1651), Confederate Irish general
- Robert Butler (Virginia politician) (1784–1853), Adjutant General of Virginia in the War of 1812
- Smedley Butler (1881-1940), major general in the U.S. Marine Corps
- Stephen Butler (British Army officer) (1880–1964), British Army major general
- William Butler (British Army officer) (1838–1910), British Army lieutenant general
- William Butler (1759–1821) (1759–1821), South Carolina Militia major general
- William Orlando Butler (1791-1880), American General during the Mexican War, U.S. Congressman and vice-presidential nominee

== See also ==
- Attorney General Butler (disambiguation)
