= Stuart Peter Rolt =

British Army general (1862–1933)

Brigadier-General Stuart Peter Rolt CB
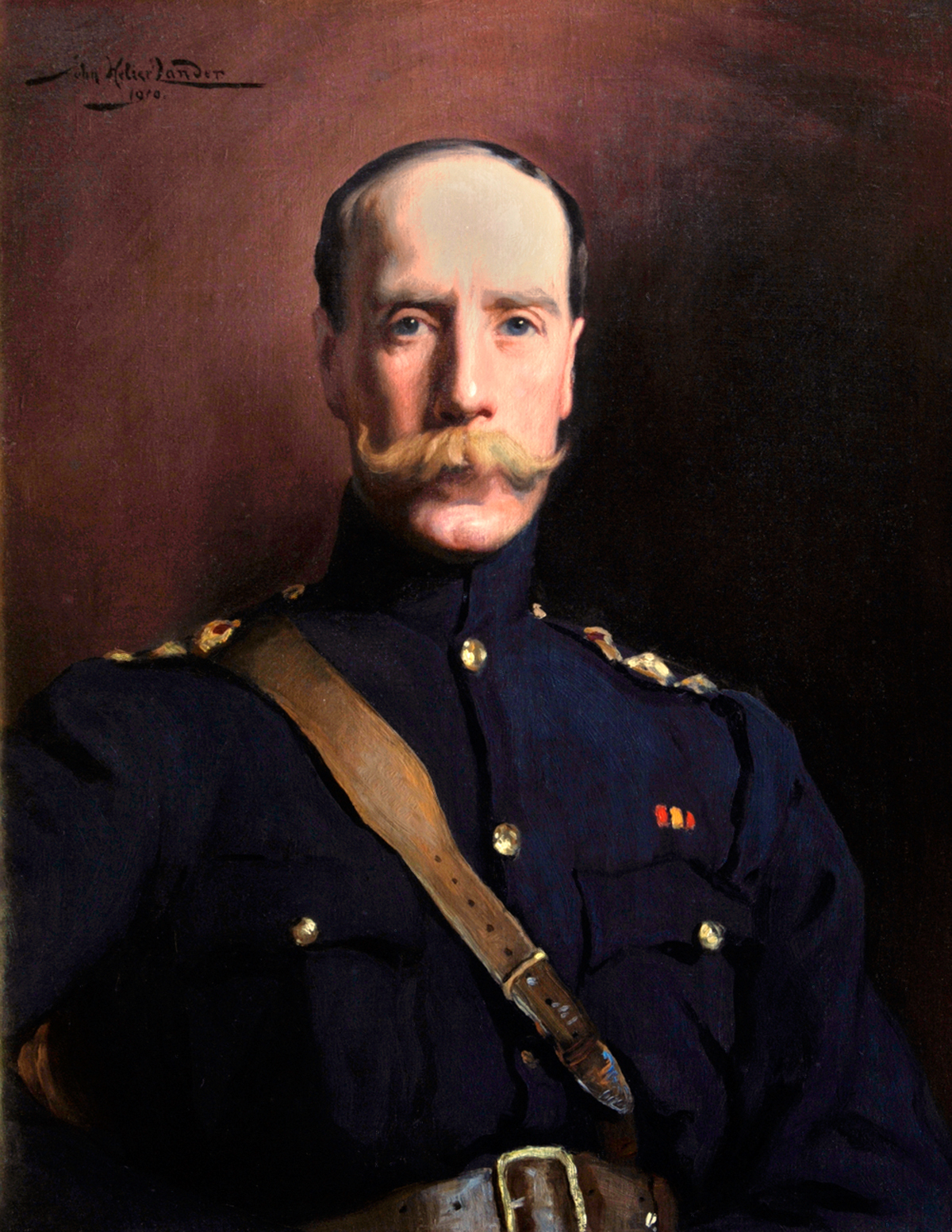
- Portrait by John St Helier Lander, 1905
- Born: 29 July 1862; Marylebone, Middlesex, England
- Died: 8 May 1933 (aged 70); St Asaph, Denbighshire, Wales
- Military career
- Allegiance: United Kingdom
- Branch: British Army
- Service years: 1884–1918
- Rank: Brigadier-General
- Commands: 14th Infantry Brigade; RMC Sandhurst; 170th Brigade
- Conflicts: Second Boer War; First World War
- Awards: Companion of the Order of the Bath

Brigadier-General Stuart Peter Rolt CB (29 July 1862 – 8 May 1933) was a British Army officer who became Commandant of the Royal Military College, Sandhurst.

== Early life and military career ==
Stuart Peter Rolt was the son of Peter Rolt, a Conservative Member of Parliament.

His military career began when he was commissioned as a second lieutenant into the 3rd (Militia) Battalion, Essex Regiment in May 1881. He transferred to the Regular Army when he was commissioned as a lieutenant into the York and Lancaster Regiment as a lieutenant on 30 January 1884, He was promoted to captain on 28 April 1890, and in November 1898 was seconded for service on the staff.

He saw service in the Second Boer War, commanding the Rhodesia Regiment, where he was wounded in action. Promotion to major came while in South Africa, on 21 February 1900, followed by promotion to the brevet rank of lieutenant-colonel on 29 November 1900.

After his return to the United Kingdom, he was appointed an Assistant Inspector of Gymnasia at Aldershot on 5 February 1901. On 31 March 1905 he was promoted to brevet colonel and in September he was appointed an inspector of gymnasia and promoted to colonel.

After serving on the staff he was placed on half-pay in April 1910 only to be made assistant director of remounts in South Africa the next day. He served in this position until November 1912 when he returned to Britain and succeeded Major General William Douglas as general officer commanding (GOC) of the 14th Infantry Brigade and which also saw him promoted to temporary brigadier general while holding the appointment.

== First World War ==
When the First World War broke out in July 1914, he took the brigade, which formed part of the 5th Division, to France as part of the British Expeditionary Force (BEF).

The 14th Brigade saw heavy action in the early stages of the war, being almost constantly engaged in combat for two months. In October, he was recalled from command on the grounds of exhaustion – though the corps commander, General Sir Horace Smith-Dorrien, was at pains to note that no stigma was to be placed on this move, and that he had in no way failed. He was replaced by Brigadier General Frederick Stanley Maude. He did not receive a new field command, but instead became commandant of the Royal Military College, Sandhurst, taking over from Brigadier General Lionel Stopford and still managing to retain his temporary brigadier's rank while still remaining a full colonel.

He held this post until August 1916, when he was appointed to command the 170th Brigade in the 57th Division, a position he held until it was sent overseas. He relinquished his temporary rank in November 1918.

== Post-war and final years ==
In December 1918, and by now unemployed, he was placed on half-pay and retired from the army in September 1919, being granted the honorary rank of brigadier general.

== Personal life and family ==
Stuart Peter Rolt married Evelyn Roylance Court, daughter of William Roylance Court and Mary Carlaw Walker, in 1912. They had four children, Pamela Rolt, Suzanne Phyllis Rolt, Sybil Mary Rolt and Tony Rolt, later a racing driver.

Military offices
| Preceded by Lionel Stopford | Commandant of the Royal Military College Sandhurst; 1914–1916 | Succeeded by Lionel Stopford |
