= William Capper =

British Army officer (1856–1934)

Colonel William Capper CVO
- Born: 6 February 1856; Bath, Somerset, England
- Died: 15 January 1934 (aged 77); Bath, Somerset, England
- Military career
- Allegiance: United Kingdom
- Branch: British Army
- Service years: 1876–1913
- Rank: Colonel
- Commands: Royal Military College, Sandhurst
- Conflicts: World War I
- Awards: Commander of the Royal Victorian Order

Colonel William Baume Capper CVO (6 February 1856 – 15 January 1934) was a British Army officer who became Commandant of the Royal Military College Sandhurst.

== Military career ==
Capper was born on 6 February 1856 at Newbridge Hill, Bath, Somerset, his father William Copeland Capper having been in the Bengal Civil Service. Educated at Haileybury, Capper was commissioned into the 85th Regiment of Foot in 1876 and subsequently played cricket for Shropshire in 1882-83 and for Staffordshire.

He became adjutant of the King's Shropshire Light Infantry in 1886. He served in the Second Anglo-Afghan War, in the 1882 Anglo-Egyptian War and in the Mahdist War in Sudan from 1884 to 1885.

He attended the Staff College, Camberley, from 1893 to 1894.

He was promoted to colonel and appointed as an assistant adjutant general in India on 15 June 1901. He was director of military education in India in December 1902. He was commandant of the Royal Military College, Sandhurst from January 1907 until 15 January 1911 when he relinquished command and was placed on half-pay.

He then served in World War I, following which he was made a CVO in 1919.

== Family ==
In 1888 he married Helen Margaret Parry; they had two daughters. He died aged 77 in January 1934 at Newbridge Hill, Bath.

He had three brothers all who served in the Army, one was Major-General Sir Thompson Capper KCMG, CB, DSO who was killed in World War I, and another was Major-General Sir John Edward Capper.

Military offices
Preceded by Gerald Kitson	Commandant of the Royal Military College Sandhurst; 1907−1911	Succeeded by Lionel Stopford
