= Reginald Stephens =

British Army general (1869–1955)

General Sir Reginald Stephens KCB CMG DL JP
- Born: 10 October 1869; Hampshire, England
- Died: 6 April 1955 (aged 85)
- Military career
- Allegiance: United Kingdom
- Branch: British Army
- Service years: 1890–1931
- Rank: General
- Unit: Rifle Brigade (The Prince Consort's Own)
- Commands: Territorial Army; 4th Division; Royal Military College, Sandhurst; X Corps; 5th Division; 25th Infantry Brigade
- Conflicts: Second Matabele War; Second Boer War; First World War
- Awards: Knight Commander of the Order of the Bath; Companion of the Order of St Michael and St George; Mentioned in Despatches (6)
- Other work: Deputy lieutenant, Gloucestershire

General Sir Reginald Byng Stephens, KCB, CMG, DL, JP (10 October 1869 – 6 April 1955) was a British Army general of the First World War and later Commandant of the Royal Military College, Sandhurst, from 1919 to 1923, Major-General commanding the 4th Division, 1923 to 1926, and Director-General of the Territorial Army, 1927 to 1931.

== Early life ==
The son of Captain Frederick Stephens, late the 2nd Regiment of Life Guards, of Bentworth Lodge, Alton, Hampshire, by his marriage on 13 January 1869 to Cecilia Mary, daughter of Captain H. Byng, of Quendon Hall, Essex, Stephens was educated at Winchester College. His sister, Mabel, was born and died in 1870, and he also had five younger brothers, Berkeley, Lionel, Gerald Edmund, Evelyn Edward, and Frederick Geoffrey, and a second sister, Cicely Mary.

== Military career ==
Stephens trained at the Royal Military College, Sandhurst, from where he was commissioned into the Rifle Brigade (The Prince Consort's Own) as a second lieutenant on 9 April 1890. He was promoted lieutenant on 13 February 1892 and captain on 28 July 1897, later antedated to 26 July. He served in Matabeleland in the Second Matabele War from 1896 to 1897 and in the Nile Expedition of 1898.

From late 1899 he served in South Africa in the Second Boer War of 1899 to 1902, during which he was severely wounded, was three times mentioned in dispatches (including on 25 April 1902 "for his conduct of a successful attack on a Boer laager of 25 January 1901, and for general good service"), promoted brevet major on 29 November 1900, and received the Queen's South Africa Medal with three clasps and the King's Medal with two clasps.

Following the end of the war, he left Port Natal on the SS Malta in late September 1902, together with other officers and men of the 2nd Battalion, Rifle Brigade, who were transferred to Egypt.

Stephens, who in December 1905 had been promoted to major, was in January 1907 made commander of a company of gentlemen cadets, in succession to Major Louis Bols.

He served in the First World War of 1914 to 1918, when he was three more times mentioned in dispatches. He began the war, having been promoted to lieutenant colonel in March 1914, as commanding officer (CO) of the 2nd Battalion, Rifle Brigade (1914–15), was promoted brevet colonel, appointed a Companion of the Order of St Michael and St George in June 1916 and of the Order of the Bath and promoted temporary brigadier general in May 1915 and then temporary major general in April 1916, which in January 1917 was made substantive. On 1 April 1916 he succeeded Charles Kavanagh as general officer commanding (GOC ) of the 5th Division. In December 1917, he led the 5th Division to Italy as part of the British participation in the Italian campaign. The stay only lasted until March 1918 when Stephens and his division returned to the Western Front to try and stem the German spring offensive. Stephens was then Major General Sir William Peyton's successor as GOC of X Corps from July 1918 to the end of the war and was granted the temporary rank of lieutenant general while holding this position.

He continued as GOC X Corps until 1919, when he was appointed a Knight Commander of the Order of the Bath, then was commandant of the Royal Military College, Sandhurst, from July 1919, taking over from Major General Lionel Stopford, to 1923; GOC the 4th Division, 1923 to 1926; and director general of the Territorial Army, 1927 to 1931. He was promoted to lieutenant general in January 1926 and, after succeeding Lieutenant General Sir Henry F. M. Wilson as colonel commandant of the 2nd Battalion, Rifle Brigade, in February 1929, he became a general in August 1930, before retiring from the service in 1931.

He settled in Gloucestershire, where he was appointed a justice of the peace and a deputy lieutenant for the county.

== Marriage ==
On 10 August 1905, Stephens married Eleanore Dorothea, the younger daughter of Edmund William Cripps, of Ampney Park, Cirencester, and they had one son and two daughters.

Their son, Frederick Stephens, CBE DSO, was born on 19 June 1906. He followed his father into the Rifle Brigade, during the Second World War commanded its 1st Battalion in the Western Desert and Tunisia, and retired as a brigadier in 1959, when he was appointed a Commander of the Order of the British Empire.

Their daughter, Air Commandant Dame Anne Stephens (4 November 1912 – 26 July 2000), was Director of the Women's Royal Air Force from 1960 until her retirement in 1963.

== Honours ==
- Companion of the Order of St Michael and St George, 1916
- Croix de Guerre, Belgium
- Croix de guerre and Legion of Honour, France, 1919
- Order of St Maurice and St Lazarus, Italy
- Companion of the Order of the Bath, 1918
- Knight Commander of the Order of the Bath, 1919

== Arms ==
- Or, on a chevron engrailed azure between two demi-lions in chief and a griffin segreant in base gules, three cross-crosslets of the field.

Military offices
Preceded by Charles Kavanagh	GOC 5th Division; 1916–1918	Succeeded by John Ponsonby
Preceded by William Peyton	GOC X Corps; 1918–1919	Post disbanded
Preceded by Lionel Stopford	Commandant of the Royal Military College Sandhurst; 1919–1923	Succeeded by Herbert Shoubridge
Preceded by Cameron Shute	GOC 4th Division; 1923–1926	Succeeded by Percy Radcliffe
Preceded by Sir Hugh Jeudwine	Director-General Territorial Army; 1927–1931	Succeeded by Sir William Thwaites
