= Andrew Ritchie (British Army officer) =

British Army general (born 1953)

Major General Andrew Ritchie CBE
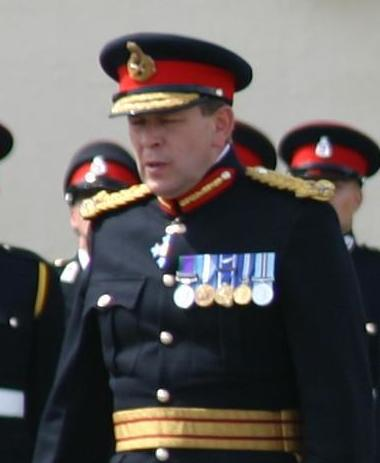
- Ritchie in 2005
- Born: 30 July 1953 (age 73)
- Military career
- Allegiance: United Kingdom
- Branch: British Army
- Service years: 1973–2006
- Rank: Major General
- Service number: 495574
- Commands: Royal Military Academy Sandhurst; 4th Division; 1st Royal Horse Artillery
- Awards: Commander of the Order of the British Empire; Queen's Commendation for Valuable Service

Major General Andrew Stephenson Ritchie, CBE (born 30 July 1953) is a retired British Army officer and former Commandant of the Royal Military Academy, Sandhurst. He was Director of Goodenough College, London.

== Early life ==
Ritchie was born on 30 July 1953 in London, England. He is the son of Dilys (née Stephenson) and Canon David Caldwell Ritchie. He was educated at Harrow County Boys' School until 1971. While serving in the British Army, he was able to attend the University of Durham between 1975 and 1978, where he gained a third-class degree in Law and Politics.

== Military career ==
Ritchie was commissioned into the Royal Artillery on 10 March 1973 as a second lieutenant. He was promoted to lieutenant on 10 March 1975, and to captain on 10 September 1979. He saw service in Belize, Rhodesia, Northern Ireland and West Germany from 1974 to 1984. Having attended the Staff College, Camberley, he was promoted to major on 30 September 1985. He then was posted to the Ministry of Defence in 1986–1987 before joining the 3rd Regiment Royal Horse Artillery, with which he served in Germany, Cyprus, and the United Kingdom from 1988 to 1990.

Ritchie was promoted to lieutenant colonel on 30 June 1990. He was Director of Army Plans from 1990 to 1992, then commanded the 1st Regiment Royal Horse Artillery from 1992 to 1995. He was promoted to colonel on 30 June 1995. He saw service in Bosnia from 1995 to 1996. He was promoted to brigadier on 31 December 1996 with seniority from 30 June 1996, before taking the Higher Command and Staff Course in 1997. He was Director of Personal Services (Army) from 1998 to 2000 and was at the Royal College of Defence Studies in 2001, then was Director of Corporate Communications (Army) in 2001–2002. On 1 April 2002, he was promoted to major general and appointed General Officer Commanding the 4th Division. He served as Commandant of the Royal Military Academy Sandhurst from 5 January 2003 to 2006. He retired on 1 August 2006.

=== Commandant of Sandhurst ===
Ritchie's tenure as Commandant of Sandhurst coincided with the attendance of Princes William and Harry at the academy, but was marred by a series of high-profile security breaches by journalists. In June 2005, a tabloid reporter successfully smuggled a fake bomb into the academy, and also claimed to have filmed Prince Harry in the supposedly secure military compound. The incident prompted a full security review by Defence Secretary John Reid. In August 2005, a journalist for another tabloid was successfully offered a job at Sandhurst despite using obviously fake credentials. A further security incident occurred in January 2006, when the entire camp went into alert over a bomb; it later turned out to be a false alarm caused by a fake bomb made for cadet exercises, which had fallen off a vehicle and then been found by Ritchie, who then raised the alarm. It was reported in The Daily Telegraph in January 2006 that in the ensuing controversy, Ritchie was saved from being sacked by a personal intervention from Prince Charles, with the Prince of Wales reported to have made "'high-level' phone calls of support" to government ministers and senior officials, and issuing "a hand-written letter" of support for Ritchie. Ritchie resigned as Commandant of Sandhurst in April 2006, resigning from the army shortly thereafter.

Ritchie also had a controversial interview with The Daily Telegraph during his Sandhurst tenure, in which he discussed suitable placements for army officers with the words, "Clearly, if say a regiment plays a lot of polo and you are a rugby player, you probably won't want to go to the polo-playing regiment", before conceding in the same interview, "I rather regret using that example", and stressed that the army was far more accessible today than when he first joined in the 1970s.

After leaving Sandhurst, Ritchie instructed media law firm Harbottle & Lewis, who successfully sued the Daily Mirror on his behalf over a front-page story (subsequently repeated in the Daily Express and The Times) headlined, "Harry's Army Chief quits 'over stress'", and "Fall Out! Exclusive: Sandhurst chief quits job after stress of looking after Princes". The Mirror offered a full retraction, paid an undisclosed sum in damages (Ritchie's writ had been for £100,000 in damages), plus legal costs, and accepted that as an army officer, Ritchie, "has been trained to deal with stress." In an interview with Ritchie after his retirement, The Daily Telegraph noted, "There were conflicting reports that 52-year-old Gen Ritchie had either been forced out, or so stressed by the security scare that he opted for early retirement", which Ritchie dismissed as "complete rubbish".

== Later life ==
After retiring from the service, Ritchie was appointed as Director of Goodenough College in London, a residential college for postgraduate students, taking his post in July 2006.

== Private life ==
In 1981, Ritchie married Camilla Trollope, and they have one son and two daughters. His Who's Who entry lists his hobbies as hunting, opera, tennis and golf.

Ritchie has been a Trustee of the British Forces Foundation since 2003, President of the Royal Artillery Hunt, a Member of the Council of Marlborough College, and a Governor of Princess Helena College since 2006, and a director of Larkhill Racecourse since 2008.

== Honours and decorations ==
Ritchie was awarded a Queen's Commendation for Valuable Service on 8 November 1996 "for gallant and distinguished services in the former Republic of Yugoslavia during the period 21st December 1995 to 20th June 1996". In the 1999 Queen's Birthday Honours, he was appointed a Commander of the Order of the British Empire.

Ritchie was appointed Honorary Colonel of the 100 (Yeomanry) Regiment Royal Artillery (Volunteers) on 17 February 2001. He was Deputy Colonel Commandant of the Adjutant General's Corps from 3 November 2005 to 2 July 2006. He was appointed Colonel Commandant of the Royal Regiment of Artillery on 1 March 2006, and relinquished the position on 1 March 2011.

Military offices
Preceded by John Holmes	General Officer Commanding 4th Division; 2002–2003	Succeeded by David Judd
Preceded by Philip Trousdell	Commandant of the Royal Military Academy Sandhurst; 2003–2006	Succeeded by Peter Pearson
Academic offices
Preceded by Timothy Toyne Sewell	Director of Goodenough College; 2006–present	Incumbent
