= Peter Pearson (British Army officer) =

British Army general

Lieutenant General Peter Pearson CB CBE
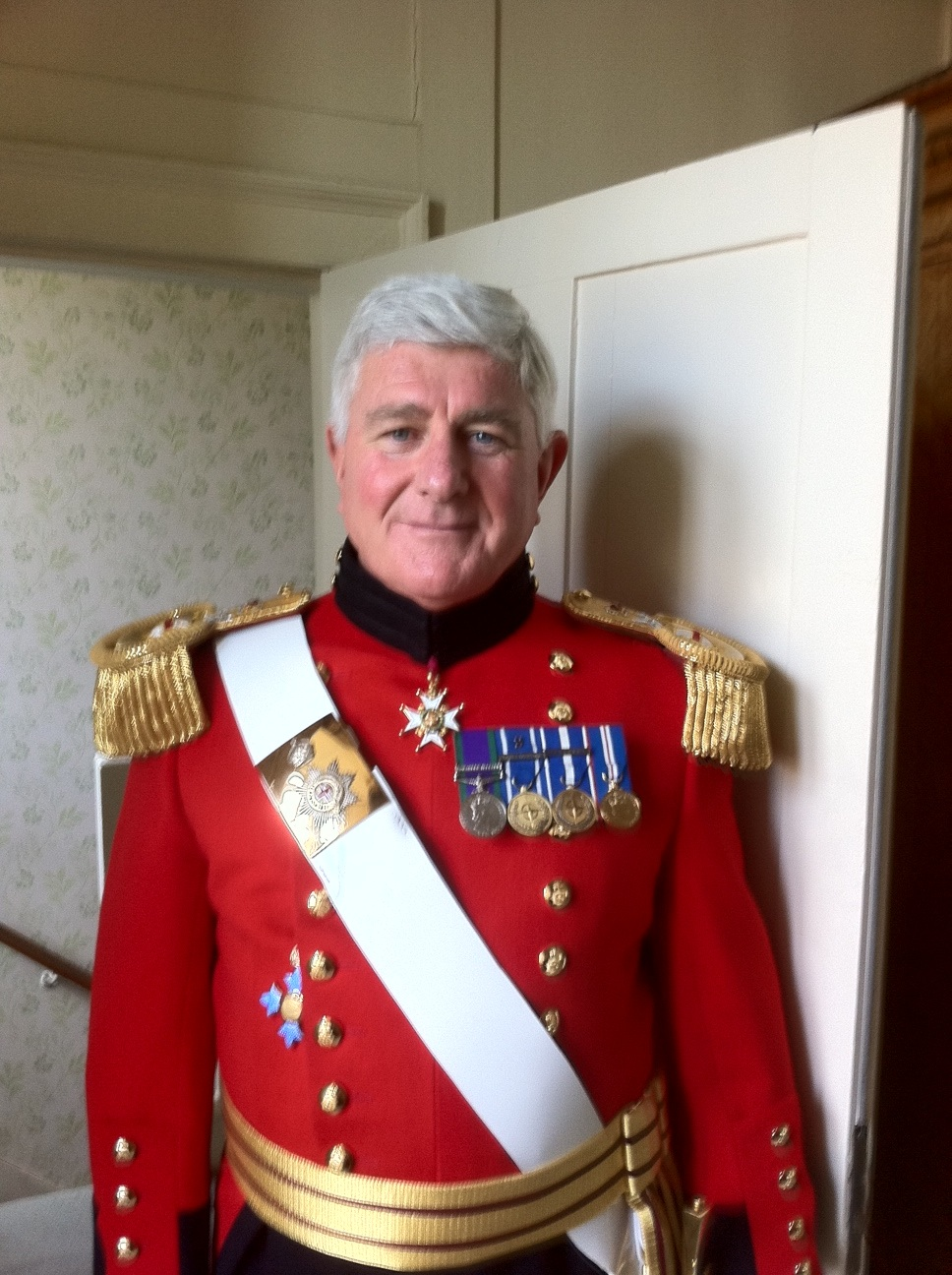
- Born: 1954 (age 71–72)
- Military career
- Allegiance: United Kingdom
- Branch: British Army
- Service years: 1975–2010
- Rank: Lieutenant General
- Service number: 501055
- Commands: Royal Military Academy Sandhurst; British Forces Cyprus; 19th Mechanized Brigade; 3rd Battalion The Royal Gurkha Rifles
- Conflicts: The Troubles; Bosnian War; Kosovo War
- Awards: Companion of the Order of the Bath; Commander of the Order of the British Empire

Lieutenant General Peter Thomas Clayton Pearson, CB, CBE (born 1954) is a former British Army officer who served as commandant of the Royal Military Academy Sandhurst from 2006 to 2007.

== Early life ==
Pearson was born in 1954.

== Military career ==
Pearson was commissioned on 8 November 1975 as a second lieutenant, having attended the Royal Military Academy Sandhurst. He transferred to the 10th Princess Mary's Own Gurkha Rifles on 29 May 1976, and joined the unit in Hong Kong. He was promoted to lieutenant on 8 November 1977. He was attached to the Argyll and Sutherland Highlanders in 1977 and 1978, with whom he served in West Germany and Northern Ireland. He returned to the 10th Princess Mary's Own Gurkha Rifles in 1979 and served as an Intelligence Officer during a tour of Brunei. He returned to England in 1980, as an instructor of the School of Infantry, Warminster.

Pearson was promoted to captain on 8 May 1982, to major on 30 September 1986—becoming chief of staff to the 20th Armoured Brigade on leaving Staff College—and to lieutenant colonel on 30 June 1991, taking up the appointment of military assistant to the commander-in-chief, United Kingdom Land Forces. He was appointed commanding officer of the 10th Gurkha Rifles in May 1993 and, when the Gurkha rifle regiments were amalgamated, became commanding officer of 3rd Battalion, The Royal Gurkha Rifles from July 1994 to December 1995. He was promoted to colonel on 31 December 1995, with seniority from 30 June. He then attended the Higher Command and Staff Course at the Staff College, Camberley. He became assistant chief of staff (land) at Permanent Joint Headquarters at Northwood in April 1996. He was promoted to brigadier on 31 December 1997 with seniority from 30 June 1997, and was appointed commander of the 19th Mechanized Brigade. In that capacity, he was deployed to Bosnia and then to Kosovo. He was appointed to the honorary position of colonel of The Royal Gurkha Rifles on 1 July 1999, succeeding Lieutenant General Sir Peter Duffell, and was appointed a Commander of the Order of the British Empire (CBE) on 3 November 2000 "in recognition of gallant and distinguished services in the former Yugoslavia and Albania during the period 1st October 1999 to 31st March 2000".

Pearson went on to be assistant chief of staff, training, in May 2000, chief of staff, Field Army in September 2001 and, on promotion to major general in July 2002, became deputy commander for operations in Bosnia before becoming commander of British Forces Cyprus and Administrator of the Sovereign Base Areas in September 2003. His last appointments were as commandant of the Royal Military Academy Sandhurst in 2006, and deputy commander, Allied Joint Force Command Naples in 2007. He was appointed a Companion of the Order of the Bath (CB) in the 2010 New Year Honours, before retiring in March 2010.

== Later life ==
In retirement, Pearson became executive director of The British Schools Exploring Society from March 2010. He succeeded Lieutenant General Sir Cedric Delves as lieutenant of the Tower of London on 4 May 2010. In 2012 Pearson was made Governor of the Military Knights of Windsor.

== Personal life ==
Pearson is married to Francesca. Together they have two sons and a daughter.

Military offices
Preceded by Thomas Rimmer	Commander British Forces Cyprus; 2003–2006	Succeeded by Richard Lacey
Preceded by Andrew Ritchie	Commandant of the Royal Military Academy Sandhurst; 2006–2007	Succeeded by David Rutherford-Jones
Honorary titles
Preceded by Sir Michael Hobbs	Governor of the Military Knights of Windsor; 2012 – present	Incumbent
