= Joseph Edward Addison =

British Army officer

General Joseph Edward Addison
- Military career
- Allegiance: United Kingdom
- Branch: British Army
- Rank: General

General Joseph Edward Addison (8 July 1821 – 17 November 1890) was a British Army officer who became Director of Studies of the Royal Military College, Sandhurst.

== Military career ==
Addison was commissioned as an ensign in the 70th Regiment of Foot on 31 January 1840. Promoted to lieutenant on 15 July 1843, he became secretary and adjutant of the Duke of York's Royal Military School in May 1849. He was promoted to captain on 9 August 1850 and to major on 16 February 1855. He became Assistant Quartermaster-General at Headquarters on 15 July 1855 and a member of the Council of Military Education on 1 June 1857. Promoted to colonel on 6 August 1861, he became Director of Studies of the Royal Military College, Sandhurst in December 1864. He was promoted to lieutenant-general on 1 January 1879 and to full general on retirement on 1 July 1881.
