= James Butler (British Army officer) =

Lieutenant-General James Butler (died 18 August 1836) was an officer of the British Army.

== Biography ==
James Butler was appointed a cadet in October 1772 and was commissioned as a second lieutenant in the Royal Artillery in January 1776. He was promoted to first lieutenant in July 1779 and to captain on 19 July 1785. He served at Gibraltar from September 1785 to September 1787, and from 1791 to 1793 was employed by the Master-General of the Ordnance, the Duke of Richmond, in teaching the improved system of tactics, and during part of the latter year in training and forming the Sussex Militia. He was granted the brevet rank of major in the Army on 6 May 1795, and of lieutenant-colonel on 1 January 1800. On 18 April 1801 he was promoted to the substantive rank of major in the Royal Artillery, and on 11 February 1802 was appointed lieutenant-colonel of the Invalid Battalion of that corps. He was promoted to brevet colonel on 25 July 1810 and on 20 August 1811 succeeded Major-General Le Marchant as Lieutenant-Governor of the Royal Military College. He retired in 1829 and was retroactively granted the ranks of major-general from 4 June 1813 and lieutenant-general from 27 May 1825. He died on 18 August 1836 at Holt Lodge, Berkshire.

Military offices
Preceded by John Gaspard Le Marchant	Lieutenant-Governor of the Royal Military College; 1811–1829	Succeeded by Sir George Scovell
