= Lionel Stopford =

British Army officer (1860–1942)

Major-General Sir Lionel Stopford KCVO CB DL
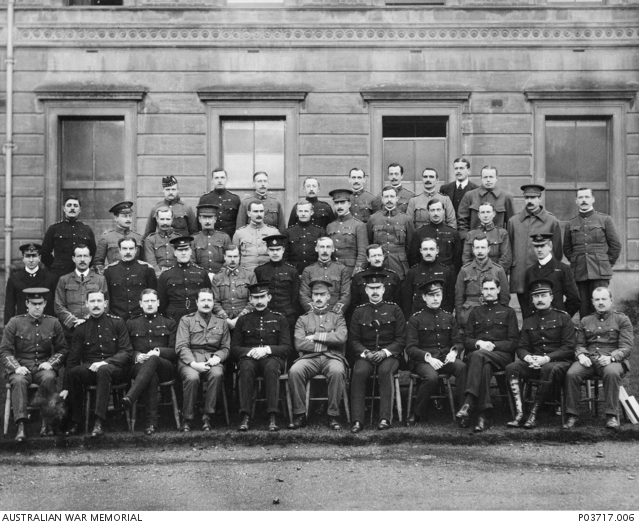
- Group portrait of officers at the British Staff College at Camberley, England, 1906; Colonel Lionel Stopford is in the front row, fifth from the right
- Born: 10 May 1860; Torquay, Devon, England
- Died: 13 September 1942 (aged 82); Lower Bourne, Surrey, England
- Burial place: St Michael's Church, Camberley, Surrey, England
- Children: 2, including Montagu
- Military career
- Allegiance: United Kingdom
- Branch: British Army
- Rank: Major-General
- Nickname: "Stoppy"
- Commands: Royal Military College, Sandhurst
- Conflicts: 1882 Anglo-Egyptian War; Sikkim Expedition; World War I
- Awards: Knight Commander of the Royal Victorian Order; Companion of the Order of the Bath

Major-General Sir Lionel Arthur Montagu Stopford KCVO CB DL (10 May 1860 – 13 September 1942) was a British Army officer who became Commandant of the Royal Military College Sandhurst.

== Military career ==
Son of Vice-Admiral The Hon. Sir Montagu Stopford, Lionel Stopford was commissioned into the Clare Militia and then transferred to the Sherwood Foresters. He fought in the 1882 Anglo-Egyptian War and, appointed an adjutant in February 1887, took part in the Sikkim Expedition in 1888.

He was promoted to captain in January 1890 and vacated his appointment as adjutant in February 1891. He was seconded for service on the staff in April 1892 and was promoted from supernumerary captain to captain in December 1893. He attended the Staff College, Camberley, from 1896 to 1897, and was again seconded for staff service in August 1898 and appointed a deputy assistant adjutant general in Ireland.

After transferring as a major to the newly created Irish Guards in October 1900, DAAG at army headquarters in April 1901. He was then a DAAG at the Staff College, Camberley in 1905. Made a brevet lieutenant colonel in January 1904, he was in September appointed a deputy assistant quartermaster general at the War Office, before becoming a deputy assistant adjutant general, on augmentation, at the Staff College in May 1905. He was raised to brevet colonel in September 1907, while still in this position. He was then appointed as a GSO1 at the Staff College in May 1908. He went on half-pay after relinquishing this assignment in January 1909 before going on to be an AAG at the War Office in 1909 and being raised to colonel soon after taking up this position, in February 1909.

He succeeded Colonel William Capper as commandant of the Royal Military College, Sandhurst in January 1911. He was promoted to the temporary rank of brigadier general in January 1913 while serving in this position.

He served in World War I as a brigade commander until June 1916 when he was raided again to temporary brigadier general and became a deputy adjutant and quartermaster general. In August he returned to his post as commandant at Sandhurst, taking over from Brigadier General Stuart Peter Rolt. He was appointed a Companion of the Order of the Bath in January 1916 and a Knight Commander of the Royal Victorian Order in January 1919.

In retirement he was deputy lieutenant of Kent.

== Family ==
In 1891 he married Mabel Georgina Emily Mackenzie; they had two sons (one of which was General Sir Montagu Stopford).

Military offices
Preceded by William Capper	Commandant of the Royal Military College Sandhurst; 1911–1914	Succeeded by Stuart Rolt
Preceded by Stuart Rolt	Commandant of the Royal Military College Sandhurst; 1916–1919	Succeeded by Reginald Stephens
