= Cavalry Staff Corps =

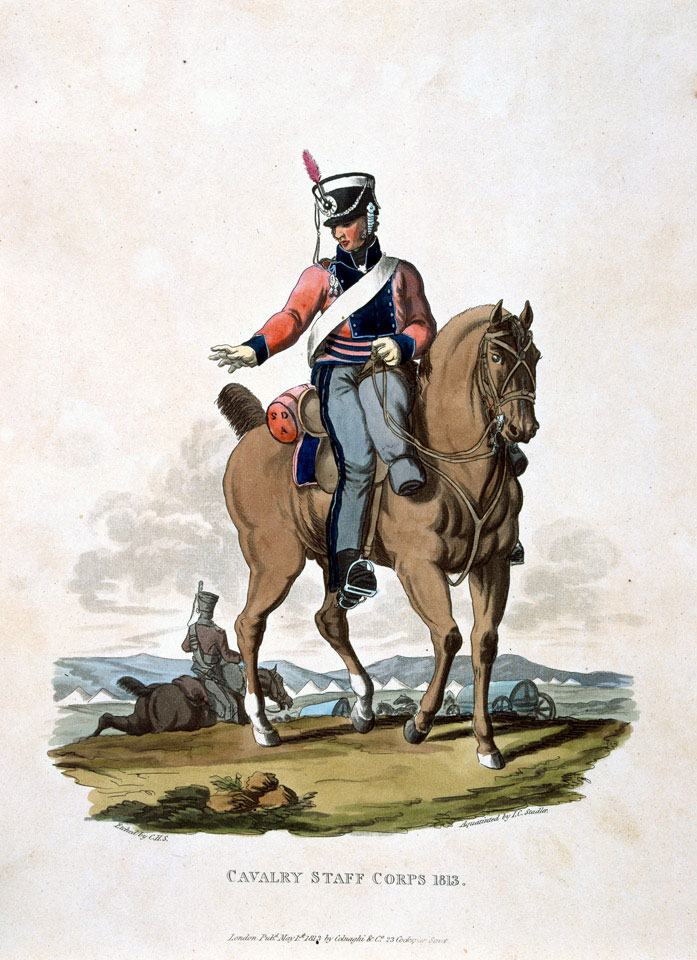
- 1813 engraving of a regimental private
- Active: 1813–1814; 1815–1818
- Country: United Kingdom
- Branch: British Army
- Type: Cavalry
- Role: Military police
- Size: 4 troops (312 men)

Commanders
- Major Commandant: Sir George Scovell

The Cavalry Staff Corps (also known as the Staff Corps of Cavalry, Staff Dragoons, or Corps of Gendarmerie) was a military police regiment of the British Army raised during the Napoleonic Wars. Consisting of four cavalry troops, the regiment was first raised in 1813 during the Peninsular War to suppress criminal behaviour and desertion among the Duke of Wellington's Anglo-Portuguese Army. It was disbanded following the end of the Peninsular War in 1814 but was reformed in 1815 and served in the Hundred Days. The regiment was stationed in France during the Seventh Coalition's occupation of France from 1815 to 1818. The regiment was Britain's first standing military police unit. A successor regiment was raised for service in the Crimean War and the first permanent British military police unit was established in 1877.

== Background ==
By 1813 the Duke of Wellington's Anglo-Portuguese Army had been fighting in the Iberian Peninsula for more than five years and was noted to be suffering from higher levels of desertion and criminality than the rest of the British Army. In January 1813 the Duke of York, the Commander-in-Chief of the Forces, wrote to the Secretary of State for War and the Colonies Lord Bathurst to propose the formation of a new regiment to help maintain discipline among Wellington's troops. This proposal was accepted and a new cavalry regiment, known variously as the Cavalry Staff Corps, Staff Corps of Cavalry, Staff Dragoons or Corps of Gendarmerie, was formally constituted by the Prince Regent in April 1813. The regiment is regarded as Britain's first standing military police unit and is acknowledged as the forerunner to the modern-day Royal Military Police.

== Formation and service in Spain ==
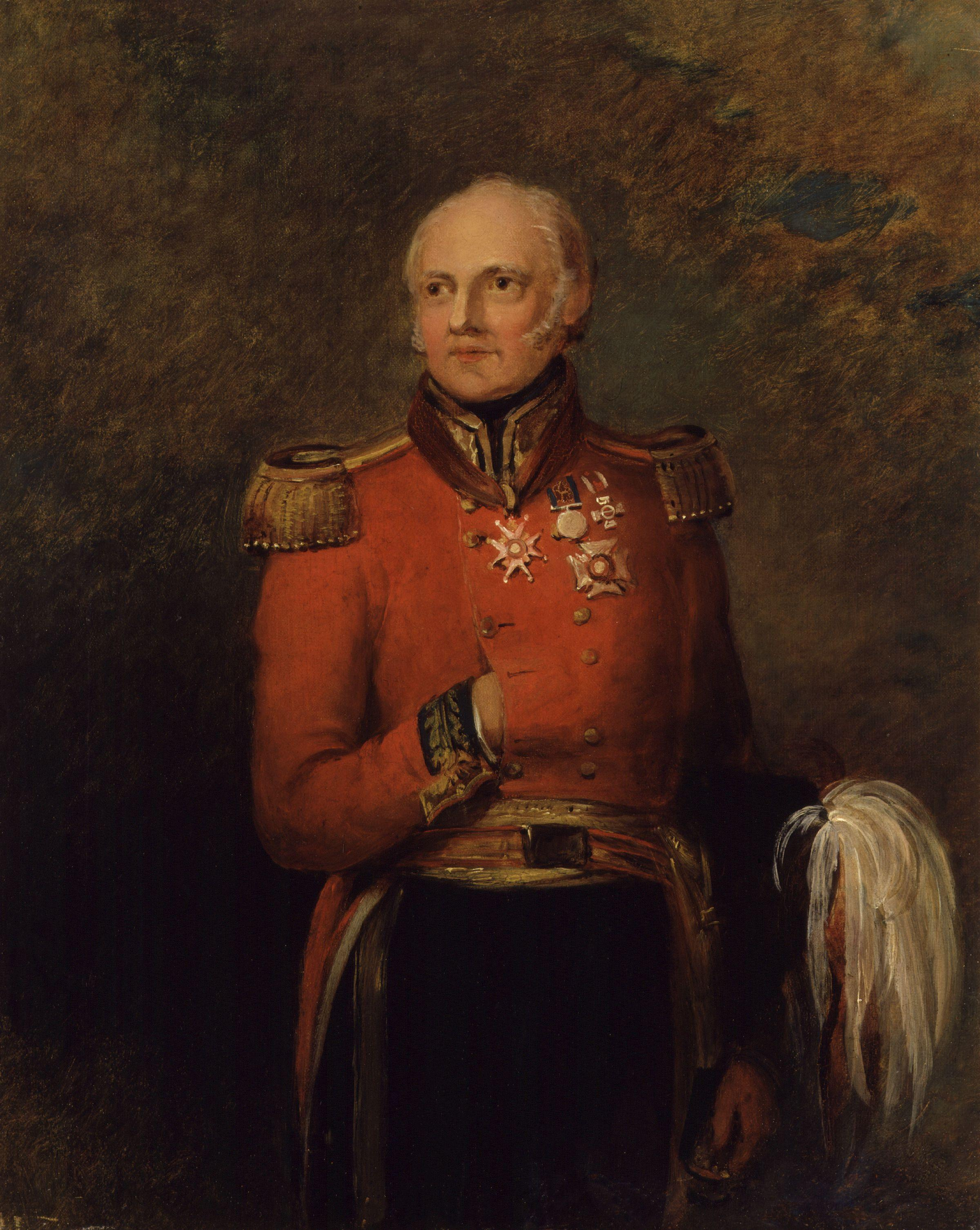
Sir George Scovell, the regiment's commanding officer

One regimental troop was raised in Great Britain, one in Ireland and two from the British troops in Spain. The regiment's members were drawn from volunteers from several regiments and were chosen on the basis of their previous good character. The troop raised in Great Britain comprised 76 men from the 2nd and 7th Dragoon Guards, 2nd Dragoons and 7th Hussars, while the troop raised in Ireland consisted of 68 men from the 1st and 6th Dragoon Guards, 6th Dragoons and 13th Light Dragoons. The two troops formed in Spain comprised four captains, four lieutenants, two cornets, six sergeants, six corporals and 120 privates recruited from cavalry units in the theatre. The regiment's other ranks received extra pay: sergeants got an extra shilling (12 pence) a day, corporals 8 pence and privates 6 pence. (Note: During this period cavalry privates were paid 2 shillings (18 pence) a day, corporals 2 shillings 4.5 pence (28.5 pence) and sergeants 2 shillings 11 pence (35 pence). This pay included an allowance for the feeding of their horse.) The regiment ranked in precedence after the rest of the Army's cavalry regiments but before the Foot Guards. Being formed under the Duke of York's authority, the Cavalry Staff Corps only had jurisdiction over infantry and cavalry units, as responsibility for the discipline of engineer and artillery units lay with the Master-General of the Ordnance.

The regeiment in Spain was formed at Fresneda de la Sierra Tirón and placed under the command of a "major commandant", Lieutenant-colonel Sir George Scovell of the 57th Regiment of Foot. The Cavalry Staff Corps's men were initially mounted on their own horses from their previous regiment until the regiment received new horses shipped from England. Scovell's orders stated that the regiment was to be employed for duties similar to those carried out by the French Maréchaussée (a gendarme unit) and to carry out "the duties of the police of the army, and in others of a confidential nature". The regiment also provided orderlies to Wellington's staff, (Note: Orderlies had previously been taken from the army's regular cavalry regiments, reducing their fighting strength.) patrolled the line of march, guarded supply depots and prevented soldiers from entering towns and cities. Detachments of the Cavalry Staff Corps were allocated to each British division in Spain.

Despite its intended purpose, the Cavalry Staff Corps were employed on reconnaissance duties in the lead up to the Battle of Vitoria, which was fought on 21 June 1813 and resulted in a decisive British victory. Following the Anglo-Spanish capture of Pamplona in October 1813 Wellington sent the regiment to scour nearby villages to search for 12,500 of his men who had failed to report for duty after the storming of the town and were presumed to have deserted. The regiment was disbanded on 25 September 1814, following the French defeat in the Peninsular War and wider War of the Sixth Coalition.

== Uniform ==
When first formed no official uniform was available and regimental troops instead wore their previous uniforms with a red scarf tied around their right shoulder as a distinguishing mark. It had originally been proposed that the corps should wear the uniform of the Royal Staff Corps (a similarly organised engineering unit) but with bearskin hats, a feature that would make them easily distinguishable from the British Army's other cavalry units. However, the regiments was eventually issued its own uniform which drew elements from other cavalry units. The jackets were red – similar to those worn by Dragoon Guards; whilst the blue plastron, striped girdle and overalls, with double stripes on the legs, were similar to those worn by Light Dragoons. The corps wore the shako worn by Light Dragoons with a unique all-red plume. All piping and cords were in white which was meant to reflect the non-combatant nature of the force. The saddle roll was marked with SD (for "Staff Dragoons") and with the letter of the man's troop. The enlisted men were armed with cavalry carbines.

== Waterloo campaign ==
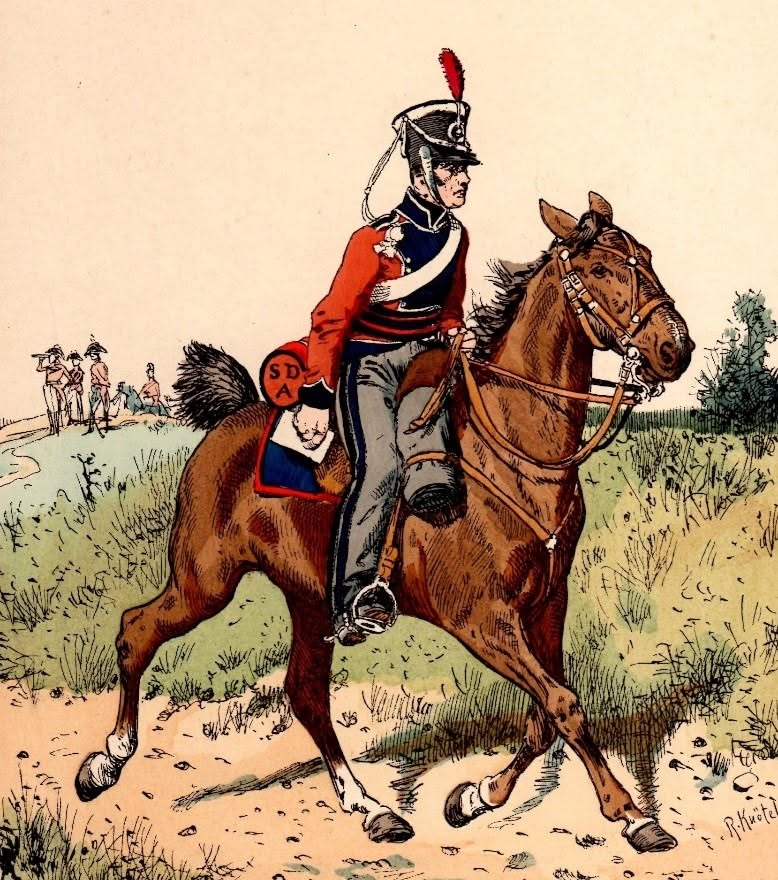
A regimental trooper on patrol

Wellington reformed the corps following the beginning of the Hundred Days and it served with his army in the Waterloo campaign. Three men were taken from each cavalry regiment, including those of Britain's allies, that were under Wellington's command and combined into a unit of two troops. The men were granted additional pay of one franc per day. Scovell commanded the unit and was requested to bring former officers of the corps over from Britain. These officer's commissions were dated 10 August 1815, though the campaign had ended the previous month with the restoration of Louis XVIII to his throne in Paris.

The two troops accompanied Wellington's army on the march to Paris and a further two troops were raised to serve during the Seventh Coalition's occupation of France. As well as policing duties the corps was responsible for making compensation payments to French citizens affected by the army of occupation. They distributed 19,000 francs to the inhabitants of Fontaine-Notre-Dame after a fire originating in a British Army forge destroyed 20 houses on 25 April 1816. The Cavalry Staff Corps acted as part of the "enemy" force during wargames of the allied armies near Valenciennes in the autumn of 1818. The allied occupation forces were withdrawn from October 1818 and the British element returned to France by the end of November. The Cavalry Staff Corps was disbanded for the second time on 24 December 1818.

== Legacy ==
During the Crimean War the concept of a mounted staff corps to maintain discipline, on a similar basis to the Cavalry Staff Corps, was revived. The Mounted Staff Corps was formed in 1854 and served with the British Army in that theatre until disbanded in October 1855. The men were recruited largely from the Irish Constabulary and were used to protect supplies being unloaded at dockyards, among other duties. The members of the corps wore a uniform reminiscent of the Cavalry Staff Corps: red tunics with hussar braid and blue facings; double striped black overalls and a plumed, police-style helmet.

Following the end of the Crimean War the British Army continued to use mounted troops as police, but on an ad-hoc basis. A formal unit, the Military Mounted Police was established in 1877 and supplemented by the Military Foot Police in 1882. These units are the direct antecedents of the modern Royal Military Police.
