= List of governors and commandants of Sandhurst =

This is a list of the governors and commandants of the Royal Military College, first at Great Marlow (1802–1812), then at Sandhurst (1813–1939), and of its successor on the same site, the Royal Military Academy Sandhurst (1947 to date).

The Commandant of the Academy, as of the former Royal Military College, is its commanding officer and is always a senior officer of field rank. Most Commandants serve for between two and three years and many go on to further significant promotions.

== History of the role ==
The Royal Military College Sandhurst was originally led by a Governor (a figurehead), a Lieutenant Governor (in command of the college) and a Commandant (responsible for the cadets). In 1812 the posts of Lieutenant Governor and Commandant were merged into the role of Commandant. In 1888 the posts of Governor and Commandant were merged into the role of Governor and Commandant and in 1902 that single role was retitled Commandant.

With the creation of the merged Royal Military Academy in 1947, the commanding officer continued to be called the Commandant.

== List of governors ==
- 1802–1811: General Sir William Harcourt (from 1809 3rd Earl Harcourt)
- 1811–1819: General Sir Alexander Hope
- 1819–1824: Major-General Sir George Murray
- 1824–1826: General Sir Alexander Hope
- 1826–1837: General Sir Edward Paget
- 1837–1856: General Sir George Scovell
- 1856–1866: General Sir Harry Jones
- 1866–1868: General Sir George Wetherall
- 1868–1875: Major-General Sir Duncan Cameron
- 1875–1882: Major-General William Napier
- 1883–1886: General Richard Taylor
- 1886–1888: General David Anderson

== List of lieutenant-governors ==
- 1801–1811: Major-General John Le Marchant
- 1811–1829: Colonel James Butler
- 1829–1837: Major-General Sir George Scovell
- 1837–1854: Major-General Thomas William Taylor
- 1854–1857: Colonel George Walter Prosser
- 1857–1864: Colonel Charles Rochfort Scott

== List of commandants ==
The Commandants include:

=== Royal Military College, Sandhurst ===
- 1864–1869: Colonel Edmund Gilling Hallewell
  - 1865–1874: Colonel Joseph Edward Addison (Superintendent of Studies)
  - 1874–1879: Colonel Frederick Dobson Middleton (Assistant to the Governor)
- 1879–1884: Colonel Frederick Middleton (Commandant reporting to the Governor)
- 1884–1886: Colonel Frederick Solly-Flood (Commandant reporting to the Governor)
- 1886–1888: Colonel Aylmer Cameron (Commandant reporting to the Governor)
- 1888–1893: Lieutenant-General Edward Clive (Governor and Commandant)
- 1893–1898: Lieutenant-General Sir Cecil East (Governor and Commandant)
- 1898–1902: Lieutenant-General Sir Edwin Markham (Governor and Commandant)
- 1902–1907: Major-General Gerald Kitson
- 1907–1911: Colonel William Capper
- 1911–1914: Major-General Lionel Stopford
- 1914–1916: Brigadier-General Stuart Rolt
- 1916–1919: Major-General Lionel Stopford
- 1919–1923: Major-General Sir Reginald Stephens
- 1923–1923: Major-General Herbert Shoubridge
- 1923–1927: Major-General Charles Corkran
- 1927–1930: Major-General Eric Girdwood
- 1931–1934: Major-General Reginald May
- 1934–1937: Major-General Bertie Fisher
- 1938–1939: Major-General Ralph Eastwood

=== Royal Military Academy, Sandhurst, 1947 to present ===
- 1947–1948: Major-General Francis Matthews
- 1948–1950: Major-General Hugh Stockwell
- 1951–1954: Major-General David Dawnay
- 1954–1956: Major-General Reginald Hobbs
- 1956–1960: Major-General Ronald Urquhart
- 1960–1963: Major-General George Gordon-Lennox
- 1963–1966: Major-General John Mogg
- 1966–1968: Major-General Peter Hunt
- 1968–1972: Major-General Philip Tower
- 1972–1973: Major-General Jack Harman
- 1973–1976: Major-General Robert Ford
- 1976–1979: Major-General Philip Ward
- 1979–1982: Major-General Richard Vickers
- 1982–1983: Major-General Geoffrey Howlett
- 1983–1987: Major-General Richard Keightley
- 1987–1989: Major-General Simon Cooper
- 1989–1991: Major-General Peter Graham
- 1991–1994: Major-General Timothy Toyne Sewell
- 1994–1995: Major-General Hew Pike
- 1995–1997: Major-General Jack Deverell
- 1997–2000: Major-General Arthur Denaro
- 2001–2002: Major-General Philip Trousdell
- 2002–2006: Major-General Andrew Ritchie
- 2006–2007: Major-General Peter Pearson
- 2007–2009: Major-General David Rutherford-Jones
- 2009–2012: Major-General Patrick Marriott
- 2012–2013: Major-General Timothy Evans
- 2013–2015 Major-General Stuart Skeates
- 2015–2020 Major-General Paul Nanson
- 2020–2022 Major-General Duncan Capps
- 2022–2024 Major-General Zachary Stenning
- 2024 – Present Major-General Nicholas Cowley

== See also ==
Royal Military College, Sandhurst
