= Goodenough College =

Postgraduate residence in Bloomsbury, London, England

Coordinates: 51°31′28″N 0°7′5″W

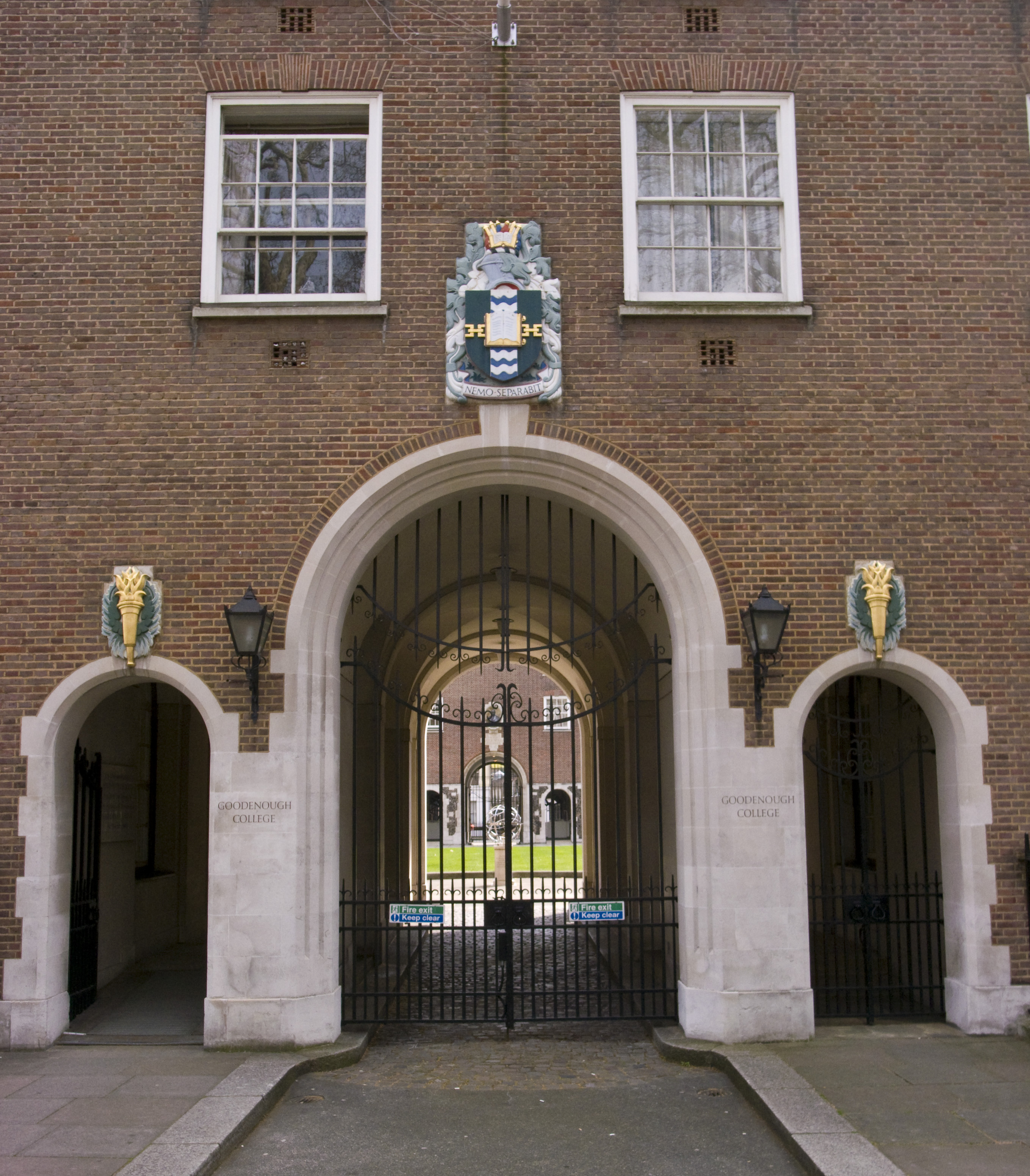
The entrance to London House, with the coat of arms on display

Goodenough College is a postgraduate residence and educational trust located on Mecklenburgh Square in the Bloomsbury district of London, England. Other names under which it has been known are London House, William Goodenough House, and the London Goodenough Trust.

== Profile ==
Goodenough College is an educational charity that provides residential accommodation for British and international postgraduates (and their families) studying in London. The College has residential and study facilities, and it also provides a programme of activities whose goal is to enhance students' personal, social and intellectual development. In a typical year, the College is home to approximately 700 postgraduate students and their families, from approximately 80 different nations.

The College is situated on Mecklenburgh Square in central London. Director of the College since April 2021 has been Alice Walpole.

== History ==
=== Founding ===
Goodenough College, originally known as the Dominion Students’ Hall Trust, was set up in 1930 by a group of prominent Londoners, including the chairman of Barclays Bank and founder of Barclays Bank DCO (Dominion, Colonial, and Overseas) Frederick Craufurd Goodenough and his wife Maeve Goodenough (nee Macnamara). Goodenough and his friends wanted to provide collegiate life along Oxbridge lines to young men coming to London from the British dominions and colonies, who could be seen as prospective leaders of what was then a large empire. The College aimed to serve as a moot hall for its residents, and a place where they could form lasting friendships in a spirit of tolerance and understanding.

The search for a site for the new college was centred on Bloomsbury, to which the University of London was preparing a move from South Kensington. A property for sale as freehold was found between Guilford Street and Mecklenburgh Square, and this was purchased in 1930.

=== London House ===
The Dominion Students’ Hall Trust was established on 25 March 1930 to provide a hall of residence, to be known as London House, for students from the Dominions. London House first opened its doors in October 1931, in Nos. 4–7 Caroline Place (now Mecklenburgh Place) on the west side of the site. The accommodation was soon full, with a long waiting list, and by the start of World War II, the Trust occupied all the properties in Caroline Place.

A new London House for 300 single students was built between 1935 and 1963 to the designs of the architect Herbert Baker, his partner Alexander Scott, and their successor Vernon Helbing. It was completed in three stages:

Stage 1 (1935–37). The southeast corner includes the Great Hall, Charles Parsons Library, common rooms, and the Guilford Street entrance. This was the only part to be completed in Herbert Baker's lifetime.

Stage 2 (1948–53). The rest of the south wing, the west wing, and the northwest corner. Alexander Scott continued in Baker's style, with some simplification of detail.

Stage 3 (1961–63). The north wing, including the northeast corner. It was built to a lower cost than the other stages, without flint-work. At the same time, architect Vernon Helbing created the College's chapel out of former offices.

=== William Goodenough House ===
During the 1940s, at the instigation of the Chairman of the College Governors, William Goodenough, the Lord Mayor of London launched a Thanksgiving Fund to raise money in the UK in gratitude to the people of Commonwealth countries and the United States for their gifts, including food parcels, during and after World War II. The money raised was made available, through the ‘Sister Trust’, to build William Goodenough House, a residence for female Commonwealth and US postgraduates, as well as married students with families. This building replaced houses that had been destroyed or badly damaged during the war on the northeast side of Mecklenburgh Square. At the same time, the bombed houses in adjacent Heathcote Street were rebuilt as an annex, and the building was completed in 1957. Later wings – Julian Crossley Court (1974) and Ashley Ponsonby Court (1991) – brought the capacity of William Goodenough House up to 120 rooms for single students and 60 flats for married couples and families. The ground floor of Jubilee Wing was later repurposed as a range of accessible accommodation for residents with physical disabilities.

=== Renamed as Goodenough College ===
In 1965, the Dominion Students’ Hall Trust and the Sister Trust merged to form London House for Overseas Graduates. Although accommodation had initially been reserved for students from the Commonwealth, students from the United States were admitted starting in 1950 and from mainland Europe starting in 1974, following the United Kingdom’s accession to the European Community. In 1991, both London House and William Goodenough House started to offer mixed accommodation. The two merged in 2001 to form Goodenough College, a community open to students of any nationality.

== Royal patronage ==
The British monarchy’s association with Goodenough College began with Queen Mary’s visit in 1937. In March 1950, the 23-year-old Princess Elizabeth (later Queen Elizabeth II) spoke at the launch of the Lord Mayor’s Thanksgiving Fund appeal, which raised funds for the construction of William Goodenough House. Queen Elizabeth II served as the College’s Patron until her death in 2022. King Charles III became the College’s second royal Patron in 2024.

== The Goodenough Hotel ==
Nos. 22–25 Mecklenburgh Square survived the Blitz and were used as a nursing home until 1989, when they were handed back in a dilapidated state. Initially, the houses were repaired and used as inexpensive accommodation for short-stay visitors, mostly returning alumni and other academics in London to attend conferences and seminars. By 1997, however, it was apparent that the buildings required modernisation if they were to meet the standards which would be required in the 21st century.

The houses were closed, and plans were made to add No. 21 to the overall project in order to upgrade the property to an income-generating hotel. There were delays because the Georgian houses are listed buildings in a conservation area, and the work required the approval of both English Heritage and the London Borough of Camden's planning department. Eventually, the plans were approved, and the renovated property opened as The Goodenough Club in April 2001. The hotel was open to academic and professional visitors as well as conference delegates from around the world, and it was renamed The Goodenough on Mecklenburgh Square in 2018.

In 2022, the hotel went through a major refurbishment of all 65 guest rooms while maintaining the property's historic features, and the name was changed to The Goodenough Hotel London. All profits generated by the hotel are directed toward supporting Goodenough College's charitable mission, including funding scholarships and providing support services for postgraduate students, particularly those from low-income or disadvantaged backgrounds.

== List of heads of Goodenough College ==
=== Directors of the College, 1945–present ===
As the name of the College and the Director's equivalent position has changed over time, the title of each appointee is given.

Directors of the College
Name	Job title and tenure	Career background
Brigadier Ernest Cecil Pepper CMG, CBE, DSO, DL (1899–1981)	Controller of London House, 1945–1949; Warden, London House, 1950–1969	former Commandant of the School of Infantry
Sir Francis "Frank" A. Loyd KCMG, OBE, MA (Oxon) (1916–2006)	Director, London House for Overseas Graduates, 1969–1979	former Queen's Commissioner (i.e. Governor) of Swaziland
Sir A. John Wilton KCMG, KCVO, MC, MA (Oxon) (1921–2011)	Director, London House for Overseas Graduates, 1979–1986	former Ambassador to Kuwait and Saudi Arabia
David A. Emms OBE, MA (Oxon) (b. 1925)	Director, The London Goodenough Trust, 1987–1995	former Headmaster of Cranleigh School, Sherborne School and Dulwich College
Major-General Timothy P. Toyne Sewell DL (b. 1941)	Director, The London Goodenough Trust, 1995–2001; Director of Goodenough College, 2001–2006	former Commandant of Sandhurst
Major-General Andrew S. Ritchie CBE, BA (Dunelm) (b. 1955)	Director of Goodenough College, 2006–2018	former Commandant of Sandhurst
Rebecca L. Matthews (Knight of the Order of Dannebrog), MA (Cantab), MA (Lond) (b. 1968)	Director of Goodenough College, 2018-2021	Former Managing Director of the European Capital of Culture Aarhus 2017
The Honourable Alice Walpole OBE (b. 1963)	Director of Goodenough College, 2021-	Former United Nations Assistant Secretary-General

=== Wardens of London House, 1947–2008 ===
Up until the 1970s, London House was a single-sex men-only building. The position of London House warden was abolished in 2008.

Wardens of London House
Name	Job title and tenure
Philip Crofton	
Reggie Gaskell	
Peter Pepper	
Lieutenant Colonel George L. Sprunt	Controller of London House, 1947–1965
Lieutenant Colonel Eric C.T. Wilson VC	Controller of London House, 1966–1977
Colonel W.C.J. Naylor DSC	Warden of London House, 1977–1983
John D. Pepper	Warden of London House, 1983–1993
Commander Christopher J.S. Craig	Warden of London House, 1993–1995
Rosemary Wilson OBE	Warden of London House, 1995–1997
Andrew H. Mellows	Warden of London House, 1997–1999
Chris Wright	Warden of London House, 1999–2008

=== Controllers and wardens of William Goodenough House, 1950-–2007 ===
From the instigation of William Goodenough House in 1950, it was run by a separate warden. Up until the 1970s, William Goodenough House was a single-sex women-only building, while London House was a men-only building. The position of William Goodenough House warden was abolished in 2007.

Wardens of William Goodenough House
Name	Job title and tenure	Career background
Dame Jocelyn May Woollcombe DBE (1898–1986)	Controller of William Goodenough House, 1950–1956	former Director of the Women's Royal Naval Service
Air Commodore Dame Felicity Peake DBE (1913–2002)	Controller of William Goodenough House, 1956–1961	former founding Director of the Women's Royal Air Force
Joanna Sybil Macdonald Dannatt MBE, MA (Cantab) (1913–2010)	Controller and Warden of William Goodenough House, 1961–1982	former ATS cipher clerk and translator
Jill C. Morrogh	Warden of William Goodenough House, 1982–1989	
Sandra E. Lello MA (Oxon)	Warden of William Goodenough House, 1989–1992	former Fellow of Hughes Hall, Cambridge
Mary M. Lomas	Warden of William Goodenough House, 1992–1994	
Noelle Vickers	Warden of William Goodenough House, 1995–2001	
Annie Thomas	Warden of William Goodenough House, 2001–2007	

=== Chairmen of the board of governors, 1931–present ===
Chairmen of the board of governors
Name	Tenure	Career background
Frederick Crauford Goodenough DCL, BA (Zurich) (1866–1934)	1931–1934	Chairman of Barclays Bank
Sir William Macnamara Goodenough LLD, DL, JP, MA (Oxon) (1899–1951)	1934–1951	Director of Barclays Bank
Sir David M. Evans-Bevan Bt (1902–1973)	1951–1965	Director of Barclays Bank
Sir Julian S. Crossley Kt, MA (Oxon) (1899–1971)	1965–1971	Chairman of Barclays Bank
Lieutenant-Colonel Frederic Seebohm, Baron Seebohm Kt, TD, MA (Cantab) (1909–1990)	1971–1983	Chairman of Barclays Bank
Sir Ashley Charles Gibbs Ponsonby Bt, KCVO, LL, MC, MA (Oxon) (1921–2010)	1982–1989	Managing Director of J. Henry Schroder Wagg
Colonel Graham Stephen Paul Carden CBE, TD, DL (1935–1992)	1990–1991	Chairman of Greenfriar Investment Co.
Rosina "Wendy" Philippa Price French, Lady French, MA (Cantab) (1927–2000)	1992–1997	Barrister and former Editor of the All England Law Reports
Sir Christopher Wates, MA (Oxon) (1939–2024)	1997–2006	Chairman and CEO of Wates Group
Dr Tidu Maini, BSc (Lond), PhD (Lond)	2006–2009	Pro-Rector for Development and Corporate Affairs, Imperial College London
Jonathan Hirst QC, MA (Cantab) (b. 1954)	2009–2016	Head of Brick Court Chambers
Eric Tracey	2016-2020	Chartered Accountant and Life Member of the Council of Chartered Accountants Australia and New Zealand (CA ANZ)
Stuart Shilson LVO DL	2020-	Director with management consultants McKinsey in London

== Notable alumni ==
1940s

- Sir Sydney Kentridge, barrister

1950s

- The Hon F. W. de Klerk (LH 58), former President of South Africa

1960s

- Dame Norma Restieaux (WGH 65), Associate Professor of Cardiology at the University of Otago
- Gordon Thiessen (LH 65–67), former Governor of the Bank of Canada
- The Rt Revd George Cassidy (LH 66), Bishop of Southwell and Nottingham

1970s

- The Rt Hon Sir David Lloyd Jones (LH 74–75), Lord Justice of Appeal in England and Wales and Chairman of the Law Commission
- Dr Helen Clark (WGH 75–76), former Prime Minister of New Zealand

1980s

- Paul Zed (LH 80–81), member of Canadian parliament
- Professor Edward Byrne (WGH 80–82), President and Principal of King's College, London
- Dr Jennifer Barnes (WGH 82–83), President of Murray Edwards College, Cambridge
- The Hon. Dr. Greg Selinger (LH 83–85), former Premier of Manitoba
- Karan Bilimoria, Baron Bilimoria (LH 85–87), co-founder and chairman of Cobra beer
- Dr Max Price (WGH 86–87), Vice Chancellor of the University of Cape Town
- Professor George Ellis (WGH 87–88), Emeritus Distinguished Professor of Complex Systems in the Department of Mathematics and Applied Mathematics at the University of Cape Town
- Carwyn Jones, Baron Jones of Penybont (LH 88–89), former First Minister of Wales

1990s

- The Hon David McGuinty (WGH 90–93), Canadian federal cabinet minister
- Stuart Shilson (LH 91–93), former Assistant Private Secretary to The Queen in the Royal Household of the Sovereign of the United Kingdom
- Stephanie Nolen (LH 93–94), journalist
- Nicole Krauss (LH 97–98), author
- Sergei Stanishev (LH 99–00), former Prime Minister of Bulgaria

2000s

- Ashvin Kumar (LH 01–03), filmmaker
- Llŷr Williams (WGH 02–06), pianist
- Scott MacIntyre (LH 05–06), former American Idol contestant
- Lewis Pugh (WGH 05–06), environmental campaigner
- Eoghan Murphy (LH 0 04-05), former member of the Irish parliament and Irish Government Minister

2010s

- Kola Tubosun (WGH 19-20), Nigerian writer and linguist.

== See also ==
- International Students House, London
- International House of New York
- Cité internationale universitaire, Paris
- International Student House of Washington, D.C.
