= Arthur Denaro =

British Army general (born 1948)

Major General Arthur Denaro CBE DL
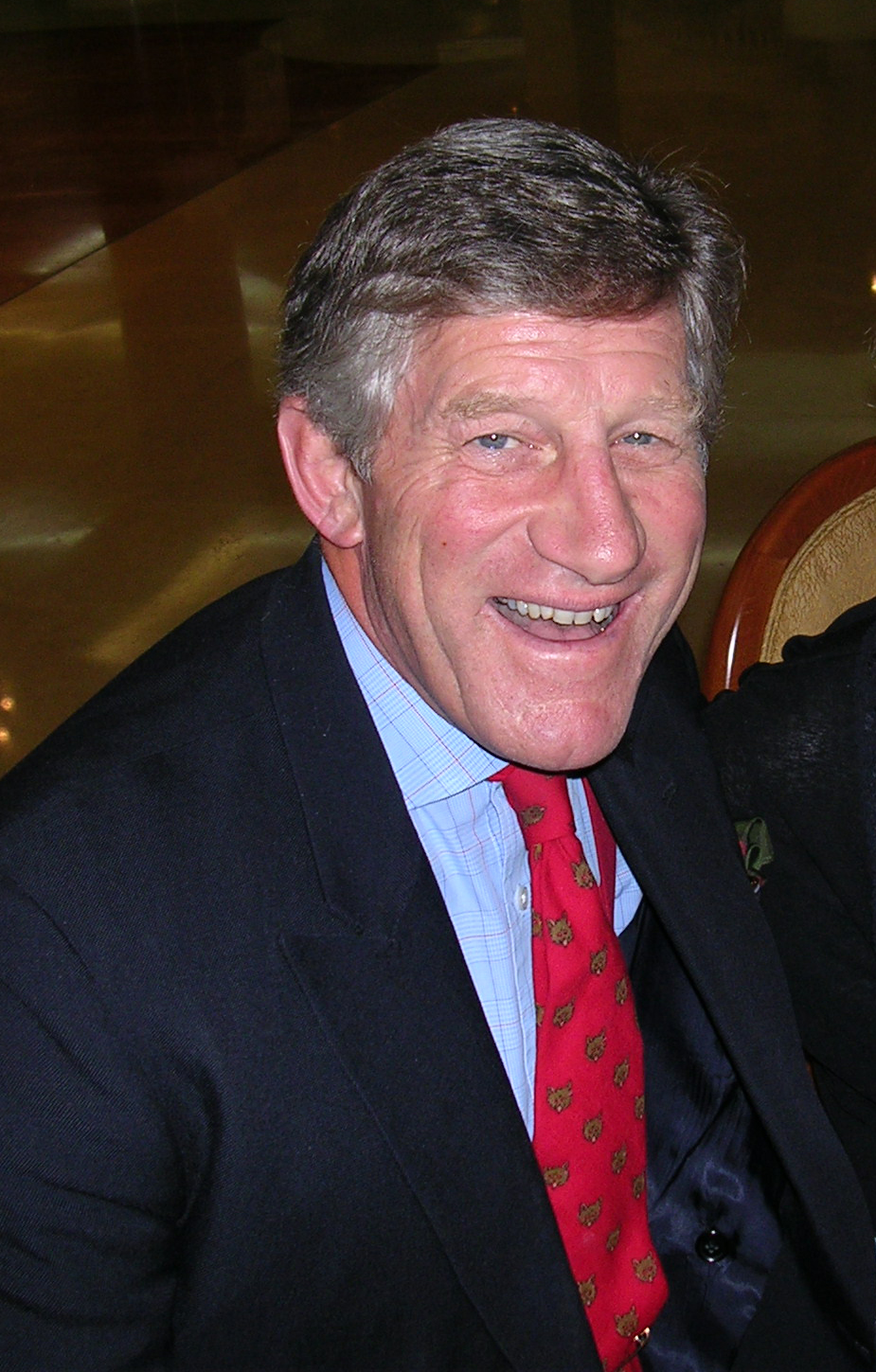
- Denaro in 2004
- Born: 23 March 1948 (age 78); Sungei Patani, Malaya
- Military career
- Allegiance: United Kingdom
- Branch: British Army
- Service years: 1968–2003
- Rank: Major General
- Service number: 485713
- Commands: 5th Division; Royal Military Academy Sandhurst; 20th Armoured Brigade; 33rd Armoured Brigade; Queen's Royal Irish Hussars
- Conflicts: Gulf War; United Nations Protection Force; United Nations Peacekeeping Force in Cyprus
- Awards: Commander of the Order of the British Empire
- Other work: Deputy Lieutenant of Herefordshire

Major General Arthur George Denaro, CBE, DL (born 23 March 1948) is a retired British Army officer. He led his regiment, the Queen's Royal Irish Hussars, during the Gulf War and later became Commandant of the Royal Military Academy Sandhurst. He commanded the 5th Infantry Division from 2000 to 2003. He was the highest-ranking officer of overseas birth in the British Army at that time.

== Early life ==
Denaro was born in Sungei Patani, Malaya, on 23 March 1948, and raised in County Donegal, Ireland. He is the son of Brigadier George Tancred Denaro and of Francesca Violet (Peggy) Denaro (née Garnett). He was educated at Downside School in Stratton-on-the-Fosse, Somerset, England.

== Military career ==
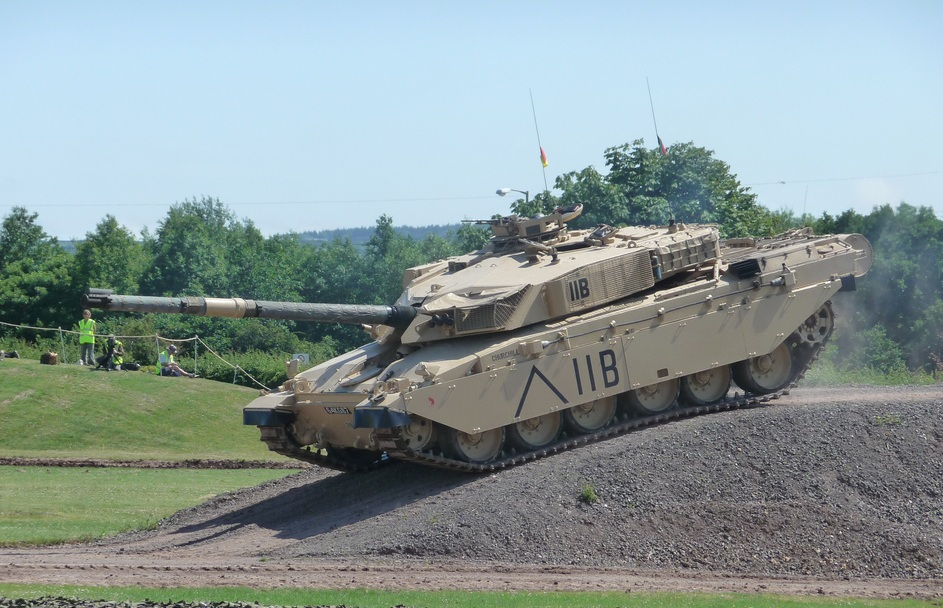
The Challenger 1 tank "Churchill" preserved at Bovington Tank Museum

Denaro was commissioned into the Queen's Royal Irish Hussars as a cornet on 2 August 1968. He was promoted to lieutenant on 2 February 1970, to captain on 2 August 1974, and to major on 30 September 1980. Confirmation of his service with the Special Air Service is given by the general himself in a book by Hugh McManners.

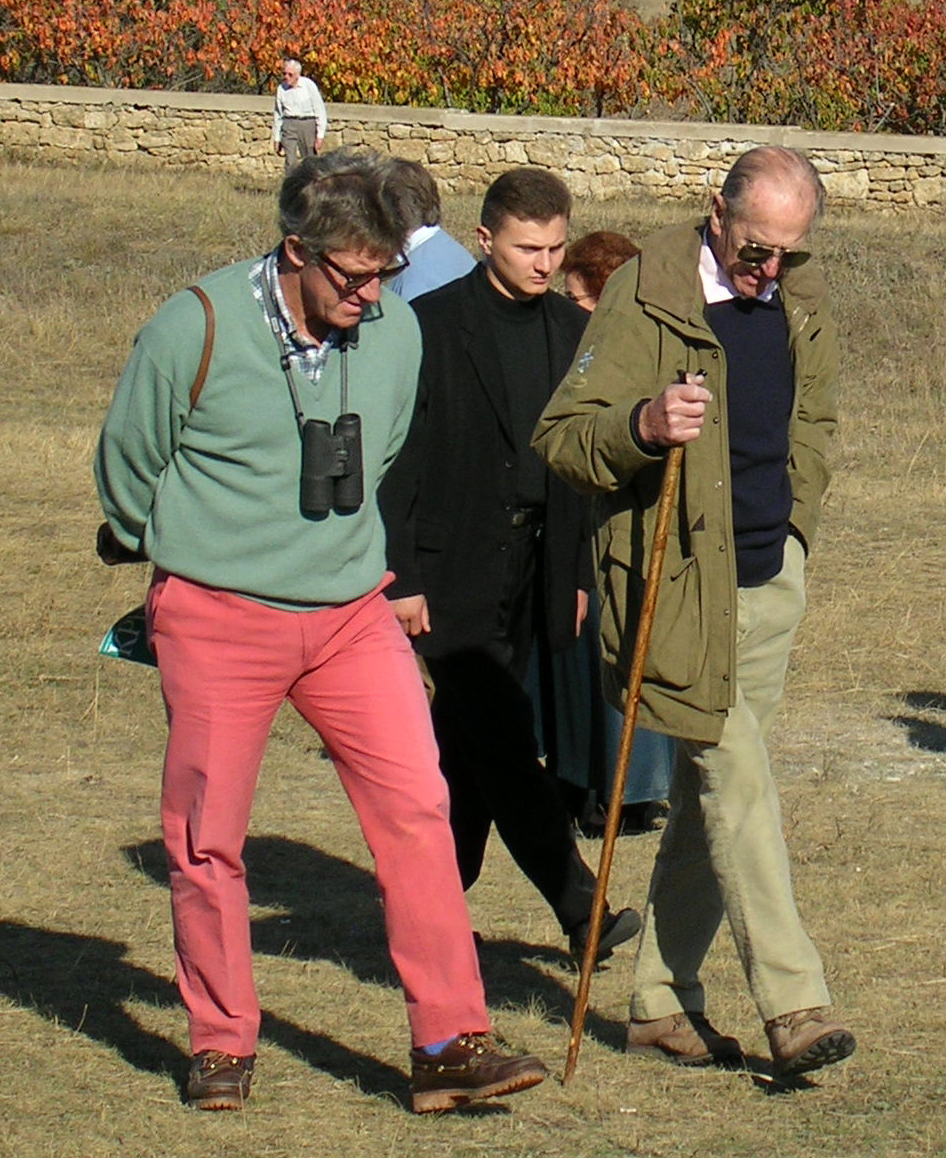
Major General Arthur Denaro with Prince Philip, 2004

Denaro commanded his regiment during the Gulf War. Prior to the war the regiment had just arrived in Fallingbostel as part of the 7th Armoured Brigade (under the command of Brigadier Patrick Cordingley), part of the 1st (UK) Armoured Division, and were engaged in training at Soltau. Denaro was recovering from a polo accident four weeks earlier, when he had broken his skull in four places requiring a metal plate to be inset, but was still taking part in the exercise. As vanguard of the British attack, and "with breathtaking speed", Denaro's regiment hooked round the Iraqi right flank to cut off their line of retreat. His Challenger 1 tank "Churchill" has been preserved at the Tank Museum Bovington in its desert colours and Irish Hussars livery. Both Denaro and his tank are immortalised in the Terence Cuneo painting "The Basrah Road", the original of which hangs in the regimental museum of the Queen's Royal Hussars at Athlone Kaserne in Sennelager.

In 1992 Denaro was appointed commander of the 33rd Armoured Brigade and later that year he became commander of the 20th Armoured Brigade. From 1994 to 1995 he served at the headquarters of UNPROFOR in the former Yugoslavia, as chief of staff of the United Nations Protection Force in Bosnia, before commanding British forces in Cyprus from 1995 to 1996. He was Chief of Combat Support for the Allied Rapid Reaction Corps in Germany from 1996 to 1997. He became Middle East Adviser to the Secretary of State for Defence in 1997.

In 1998 Denaro was appointed Commandant of the Royal Military Academy Sandhurst and he commanded the 5th Division from 2000 to 2003, when he retired from the service. Denaro has served as President of the Army Polo Association from 2002 and was Honorary Colonel of the Royal Gloucestershire Hussars and of the Royal Wessex Yeomanry from 2003 to 2009, as well as Colonel of the Queen's Royal Hussars (Queen's Own and Royal Irish) from 2004 to 2008 before handing over to Brigadier Andrew Bellamy.

== Later life ==
After retiring from the British Army, Denaro was adviser to Salman bin Hamad bin Isa Al Khalifa, crown prince of Bahrain, from 2003 to 2007 and he joined Strategic Real Estate Advisors and the Inspirational Development Group in 2007. He was appointed a Deputy Lieutenant for Herefordshire in 2008. In retirement he also served as a Trustee of The Prince's Trust and is an extra equerry to the King Charles III. Denaro is active in the Old Comrades Association of the Queen's Royal Hussars, where he is known to all as "General Arthur". He remains as president of the Combined Irish Regiments Association (since 2003).

Since leaving the army, Denaro has made a number of corporate speaking and after dinner appearances, and is represented by a number of companies including "Military Speakers".

== Personal life ==
In 1980, Denaro married Margaret Roney Acworth (Maggi), widow of Major Michael Kealy. Together they have one son (commissioned into the Queen's Royal Hussars in 2008) and one daughter. He also has a step-son and two step-daughters from Maggi's first marriage.

Military offices
Preceded by Jack Deverell	Commandant of the Royal Military Academy Sandhurst; 1997–2000	Succeeded by Philip Trousdell
Preceded by Peter Grant Peterkin	General Officer Commanding 5th Division; 2000–2003	Succeeded by Nicholas Cottam
