= Edwin Markham (British Army officer) =

British Army general (1833–1918)

Lieutenant-General Sir Edwin Markham KCB
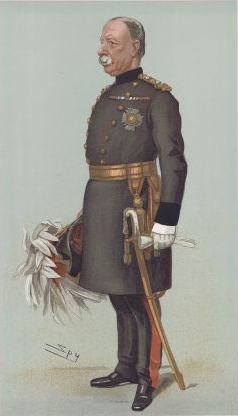
- Born: 28 March 1833; Aberford, Yorkshire, England
- Died: 1 April 1918 (aged 85); Brighton, Sussex, England.
- Military career
- Allegiance: United Kingdom
- Branch: British Army
- Service years: 1850–1900
- Rank: Lieutenant-General
- Commands: Royal Military College, Sandhurst
- Conflicts: Crimean War
- Awards: Knight Commander of the Order of the Bath

Lieutenant-General Sir Edwin Markham KCB (28 March 1833 – 1 April 1918) was a British Army officer who became Lieutenant Governor of Jersey in 1892.

== Early life ==
Markham was born in Aberford, Yorkshire on 28 March 1833, the son of Colonel William Markham and Lucy Anne Markham.

== Military career ==
Markham was educated at the Royal Military Academy, Woolwich. He passed out and commissioned into the Royal Artillery in 1850 Markham served in the Crimean War. Markham served the Eastern campaign of 1854, and up to January 1855, including the affair of M'Kenzie's Farm, the Battle of Alma and the Battle of Inkerman, the Siege of Sevastopol and repulse of the Russian sortie on 26 October 1854 (he was awarded the medal with three clasps, appointed a Knight of the Legion of Honor and awarded the Turkish Medal). In 1855, he took command of the 2nd Division in the Crimea. He served in India in 1858, and was present at the action of Secundra on 23 January 1858 (he was awarded the medal). He was appointed Lieutenant Governor of Jersey in 1892 and went on to be Director General of Ordnance in 1896 before being made Governor and Commandant of the Royal Military College, Sandhurst in 1898. He retired from the army in March 1900, but continued in command at Sandhurst for another two years, until he became incapacitated in July 1902.

== Family ==
On 8 February 1877 at Woolwich he married Emily Evelyn Lucy Stopford (1854-1919). They had two sons and a daughter (Muriel Markham, Montagu Wilfred Markham and Edwyn Guy Markham). Markham died on 1 April 1918 in Brighton, Sussex, aged 85.

Government offices
Preceded by Charles Ewart	Lieutenant Governor of Jersey; 1892–1895	Succeeded by Sir Edward Hopton
Military offices
Preceded by Sir Cecil East	Governor and Commandant of the Royal Military College Sandhurst; 1898–1902	Succeeded by Gerald Kitson
