= Gerald Kitson =

British Army general (1856–1950)

Major-General Sir Gerald Kitson KCVO CB CMG
- Born: 6 October 1856; Morval, Cornwall, England
- Died: 3 March 1950 (aged 93); Redhill, Surrey, England
- Military career
- Allegiance: United Kingdom
- Branch: British Army
- Service years: 1875–1918
- Rank: Major-General
- Commands: Royal Military College of Canada; Royal Military College, Sandhurst; Jubbulpore Brigade; Jullundur Brigade; 2nd (Rawalpindi) Division
- Conflicts: First World War
- Awards: Knight Commander of the Royal Victorian Order; Companion of the Order of the Bath; Companion of the Order of St Michael and St George

Major-General Sir Gerald Charles Kitson KCVO CB CMG (6 October 1856 – 3 March 1950) was a British Army officer who became Commandant of the Royal Military College Sandhurst.

== Military career ==
The youngest son of the Rev James Buller Kitson, Gerald was educated at Winchester College and Royal Military College Sandhurst, Gerald Kitson was commissioned into the 1st Regiment of Foot in 1875 and transferred to the King's Royal Rifle Corps in 1876.

After serving as aide-de-camp to the Viceroy of India from 1879 and then as aide-de-camp to the General Officer Commanding Western District from 1884, he was appointed Deputy Assistant Adjutant-General in Meerut in 1890, Assistant Adjutant-General in Ambala in 1892 and Commandant of the Royal Military College of Canada in Kingston in 1896. In Canada he introduced major reforms clearing out the staff and reducing the College programme from four years to three years. and in the New Year Honours on 1 January 1901 he was appointed a Companion of the Order of St Michael and St George (CMG) for his work there.

He went on to be military attaché in Washington D. C. in 1900. Two years later he was on 17 September 1902 appointed commandant of the Royal Military College, Sandhurst, arriving there after a tumultuous year at the college during which cadets had been expelled and its position as a place of discipline was at stake. He was given command of the Jubbulpore Brigade in India in 1907, and for which he was made a temporary brigadier general while so employed, and of the Jullundur Brigade in 1908 before becoming Quartermaster-General in India in 1909.

He was made a Companion of the Order of the Bath in June 1910 and commanded the 2nd (Rawalpindi) Division in India from 1912, through the early years of the Great War, until 1916 and retired from the army on 20 December 1918.

Kitson lived at Wendlebury House near Bicester in Oxfordshire. In 1939 he gave his support to a campaign to stop the abolition of the kilt in the British Army.

Military offices
Preceded by Raymond Reade	Commandant of the Royal Military College of Canada; 1896-1900	Succeeded by John Oliver
Preceded by Sir Edwin Markham	Commandant of the Royal Military College Sandhurst; 1902–1907	Succeeded by William Capper
