= Attorney General Butler =

Attorney General Butler may refer to:

- Benjamin Franklin Butler (lawyer) (1795–1858), Attorney General of the United States
- Edward Butler (Australian politician) (1823–1879), Attorney General of New South Wales

== See also ==
- General Butler (disambiguation)
