= Cecil East =

British Army general (1837–1908)

General Sir Cecil East KCB
- Born: 10 July 1837
- Died: 14 March 1908 (aged 70)
- Military career
- Allegiance: United Kingdom
- Branch: British Army
- Service years: 1854–1903
- Rank: General
- Commands: Royal Military College, Sandhurst
- Conflicts: Crimean War; Indian Mutiny; Anglo-Zulu War; Third Anglo-Burmese War
- Awards: Knight Commander of the Order of the Bath

General Sir Cecil James East KCB (10 July 1837 – 14 March 1908) was a British Army officer who became Governor and Commandant of the Royal Military College Sandhurst.

== Military career ==
East was commissioned as an ensign in the 82nd Regiment of Foot in 1854 and fought in the Crimean War. He also served in the Indian Mutiny and was wounded at Cawnpore. He transferred to the 41st Regiment of Foot and served as Assistant Quartermaster-General on the Lushai expedition in 1871 before being appointed Deputy Adjutant and Quartermaster-General during the Anglo-Zulu War of 1879 and then becoming Commander of the 1st Division during the Third Anglo-Burmese War in 1885. He went on to command several districts in India and became Governor and Commandant of the Royal Military College Sandhurst from 1893 to 1898. He was promoted to general on 27 August 1902.

In retirement he lived in Fairhaven near Winchester. He is buried at Kings Worthy in Hampshire. He is author of a book entitled The Armed Strength of France.

== Family ==
In 1863 he married Jane Catharine Smith; they had a son and a daughter, Charles Conran East and Kate Florence East. Then in 1875 he married Frances Elizabeth Mogg; they had one daughter.

== Sources ==
- Vibart, Henry Meredith (1912). "East, Cecil James" . In Lee, Sidney (ed.). Dictionary of National Biography (2nd supplement). London: Smith, Elder & Co.

Military offices
Preceded by Edward Clive	Governor and Commandant of the Royal Military College Sandhurst; 1893–1898	Succeeded by Sir Edwin Markham
