= Philip Trousdell =

British Army general (born 1948)

Lieutenant General Sir Philip Trousdell KBE CB
- Born: Philip Charles Cornwallis Trousdell; 13 August 1948 (age 78); Downpatrick, Northern Ireland
- Military career
- Allegiance: United Kingdom
- Branch: British Army
- Service years: 1968–2005
- Rank: Lieutenant General
- Service number: 485848
- Commands: 1st Battalion, Royal Irish Rangers; 48th Gurkha Brigade; Royal Military Academy Sandhurst; Headquarters Northern Ireland
- Conflicts: Operation Banner
- Awards: Knight Commander of the Order of the British Empire; Companion of the Order of the Bath

Lieutenant General Sir Philip Charles Cornwallis Trousdell KBE CB (born 13 August 1948) is a retired senior British Army officer who was general officer commanding Northern Ireland and Commandant of the Royal Military Academy Sandhurst. He was commanding officer of the 2nd Battalion, Royal Irish Rangers before advancing to high command and in that capacity was deployed to Bosnia-Herzegovina.

== Early life ==
Trousdell was educated at Berkhamsted School, Hertfordshire, England.

== Military career ==
Trousdell was commissioned into the Royal Irish Rangers on 2 August 1968 as a second lieutenant. He was promoted to lieutenant on 2 February 1970, Between 1968 and 1974, he served in the United Kingdom, Gibraltar, Libya, Bahrain, Oman and Northern Ireland. He was promoted to captain on 2 August 1974. Between 1974 and 1977, he served as Signals Officer and Adjutant of 2nd Battalion, Royal Irish Rangers.

Having attended the Staff College, Camberley, Trousdell was promoted to major on 30 September 1980. He then became an instructor in the Junior wing of Camberley. He returned to 2nd Battalion, Royal Irish Rangers as a company commander. He served as officer commanding a company in Berlin, Germany, and in Dover, Kent. From 1985 to 1987, he was posted to the Ministry of Defence as a Military Assistant to the Assistant Chief of the General Staff, then Major-General John MacMillan. He was promoted to lieutenant colonel on 31 December 1986, with seniority from 30 June 1986. He spent the next two years as a member of the Directing Staff at Camberley.

Trousdell was commanding officer of 1Bn Royal Irish Rangers from February 1989 to August 1991. He attended the Higher Command and Staff Course, graduating in April 1991, and was promoted to colonel on 30 June 1991. From August 1991 to January 1992, he was based in Northern Ireland, overseeing the amalgamation of the Ulster Defence Regiment and the Royal Irish Rangers into the Royal Irish Regiment. He was promoted to brigadier on 31 December 1991, with seniority from 30 June 1991. From January 1992 to November 1993, he was commanding officer of the 48 Gurkha Brigade in Hong Kong. He was posted to the Ministry of Defence from November 1993 until January 1997 as Director of Public Relations (Army).

Trousdell was promoted to major-general on 23 April 1997 with seniority from 22 February 1996. He served as Chief of Staff at Headquarters Land Command from 1997 to 2000. On 6 March 2000, he was appointed Deputy Commander of Operations for the Stabilisation Force in Bosnia-Herzegovina. In 2001 he was appointed Commandant of the Royal Military Academy Sandhurst. On 13 January 2003, he was promoted to lieutenant-general and appointed general officer commanding Northern Ireland. He retired on 10 August 2005.

== Later life ==
Trousdell has been Chairman of the Civil Nuclear Police Authority since 29 September 2011, having been interim Chairman from 20 May 2011. He is a trustee of Help for Heroes.

== Honours and decorations ==
Trousdell was appointed Commander of the Order of the Bath (CB) in the 2000 Queen's Birthday Honours. In the 2004 Queen's Birthday Honours, he was appointed Knight Commander of the Order of the British Empire (KBE).

He held the honorary position of Colonel of The Queen's Own Gurkha Transport Regiment from 27 October 1993 to 1 July 2003. He was appointed Deputy Colonel of The Royal Irish Regiment on 1 July 1996, relinquishing the appointment on 1 July 2001 when he was appointed Colonel of the Regiment. On 1 April 2001, he was appointed Colonel Commandant of Media Operations Group (Volunteers), and his tenure expired on 1 April 2006. He was appointed Colonel Commandant of the Brigade of Gurkhas from 1 July 2003 to 1 April 2007.

Military offices
Preceded by Arthur Denaro	Commandant of the Royal Military Academy Sandhurst; 2001–2003	Succeeded by Andrew Ritchie
Preceded by Sir Alistair Irwin	General Officer Commanding the British Army in Northern Ireland; 2003–2005	Succeeded by Sir Redmond Watt
