= Stuart Shilson =

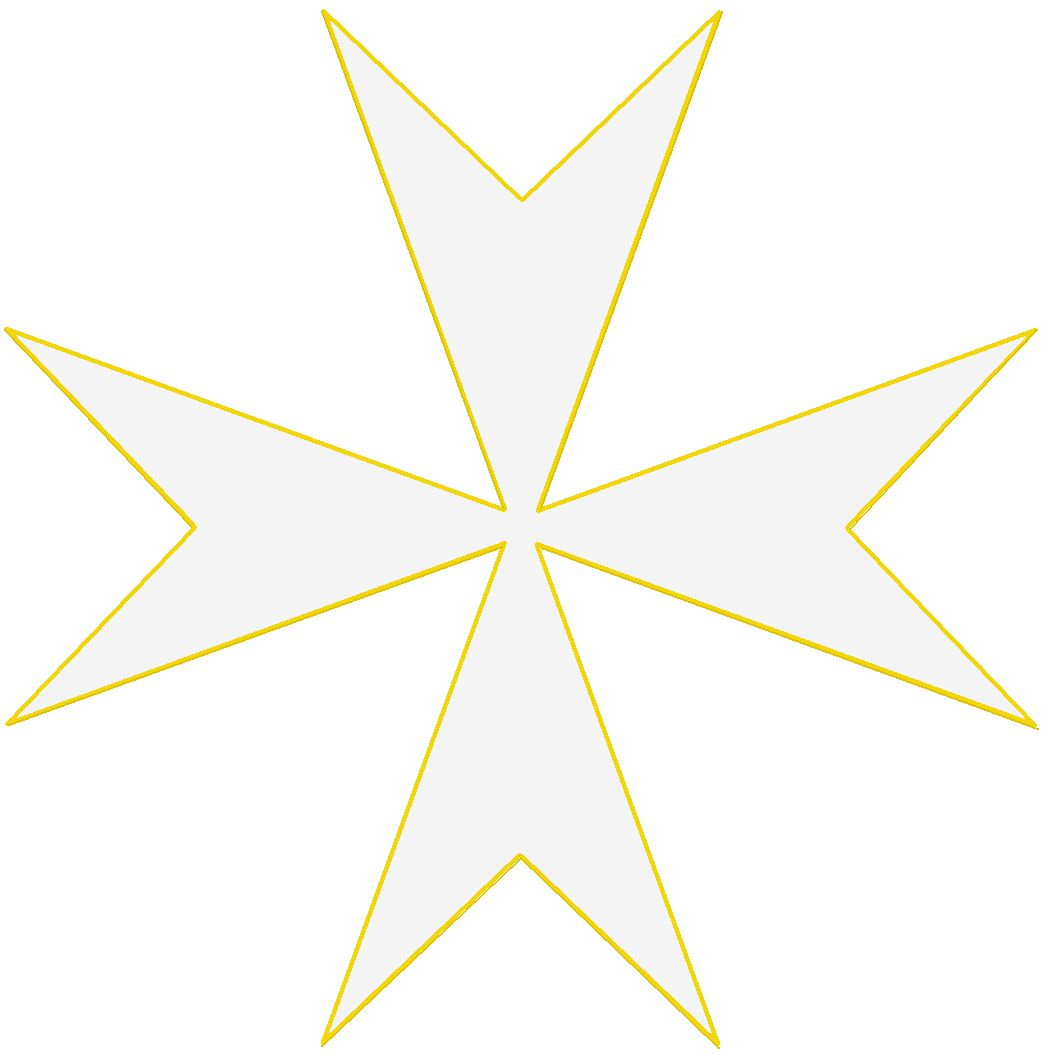

Stuart James Shilson CBE LVO GCStJ DL (born 1966) is a British management consultant and courtier, who served as Prior of St John in England (2022–2025).

Assistant Private Secretary to Queen Elizabeth II in the Royal Household of the Sovereign of the United Kingdom from 2001 until 2004, he returned to management consultants McKinsey & Company, becoming a senior partner.

== Career ==
After attending St Paul's School in London, Shilson went up to Balliol College, Oxford, graduating with a first class degree in Mathematics and Philosophy (MA). He then pursued further studies, receiving an MSc degree in Computer Science from the University of Oxford and an MPhil degree in Law and Criminal Justice from the University of Cambridge.

Called to the Bar at Middle Temple in 1992, he practised commercial law for five years and then joined McKinsey, being seconded for one year to the Cabinet Office from 1999. Shilson is now a director of McKinsey in London.

Elected a Fellow of the Royal Geographical Society (FRGS) in 1989 and a Fellow of the Royal Society of Arts (FRSA) in 1996, Shilson was appointed Chairman of Goodenough College in 2020. In 2019, he was commissioned as a Deputy Lieutenant (DL) for Greater London.

Master of the Drapers' Company for 2022/23, Shilson served as Sub-Prior of the Most Venerable Order of Saint John from 2013 to 2016 then as Prior of St John for England and the Islands from 2022 to 2025.

== Family ==
A son of David Shilson, he married in 1989 Sarah Coleman.

== Honours ==
- – Commander of the Order of the British Empire (CBE; 2025)
- – Lieutenant of the Royal Victorian Order (LVO; 2004)
- – Bailiff Grand Cross of the Order of St John (GCStJ; 2013)
- – Queen Elizabeth II Golden Jubilee Medal (2002)
- – King Charles III Coronation Medal (2023)

== See also ==
- Order of Saint John

Court offices
Preceded by Sir Tim Hitchens	Assistant Private Secretary to the Sovereign; 2001–2004	Succeeded by The Baron Geidt
Other offices
Preceded by Surgeon Rear Admiral; Lionel Jarvis	Prior of the Order of Saint John; 2022–2025	Succeeded by Rear Admiral; Simon Williams
