= David Rutherford-Jones =

British Army general (born 1958)

Major General David Rutherford-Jones CB
- Born: 11 August 1958 (age 68)
- Military career
- Allegiance: United Kingdom
- Branch: British Army
- Service years: 1977–2011
- Rank: Major General
- Service number: 504501
- Commands: The Light Dragoons; 20th Armoured Brigade; Royal Military Academy Sandhurst
- Conflicts: United Nations Peacekeeping Force in Cyprus; Kosovo War; Iraq War
- Awards: Companion of the Order of the Bath; Queen's Commendation for Valuable Service

Major General David John Rutherford-Jones, CB (born 11 August 1958) is a retired British Army officer and former Commandant of the Royal Military Academy Sandhurst.

== Early life ==
Rutherford-Jones was born on 11 August 1958 and educated at Lancing College, West Sussex, from 1972 to 1976.

== Military career ==
After attending the Royal Military Academy, Sandhurst, Rutherford-Jones was commissioned into the 15th/19th Hussars as a second lieutenant on 6 August 1977. He was promoted to lieutenant on 6 August 1979, to captain on 6 February 1984, and major on 30 September 1990. In 1991, he commanded B squadron, 15th/19th Hussars during a 6-month tour of duty as part of the United Nations Peacekeeping Force in Cyprus.

Rutherford-Jones served as chief of staff of the 1st Mechanised Brigade from 1993 to 1996. He was promoted to lieutenant colonel on 30 June 1996. He served at Supreme Headquarters Allied Powers Europe as a Staff Officer (Class 1) in the Joint Operation Centre from 1996 to 1997, and was chief of staff of the 3rd (UK) Division prior to the Kosovo War. He was then commanding officer of The Light Dragoons. While CO, the regiment served for a time in the Balkans. He was promoted to colonel on 30 June 2000, and to brigadier on 31 December 2001 with seniority from 30 June 2001.

Rutherford-Jones commanded the 20th Armoured Brigade during tours of duty in Kosovo (2001/02) and Iraq (2003/04). He was awarded the Queen's Commendation for Valuable Service "in recognition of gallant and distinguished services in the former Yugoslavia during the period 1st October 2001 to 31st March 2002". He became Director of the Royal Armoured Corps in 2005, and was appointed Aide de Camp to Queen Elizabeth II from 12 December 2005 to 1 October 2007. On 14 August 2007, he was promoted to major general and appointed Commandant of the Royal Military Academy Sandhurst. In September 2009, he became Military Secretary. Rutherford-Jones was appointed Companion of the Order of the Bath in the 2010 Birthday Honours, and retired from the army on 25 May 2011.

Rutherford-Jones was appointed Colonel Commandant of the Royal Corps of Army Music on 31 October 2009.

== Later life ==
Upon retirement, Rutherford-Jones became Chief Executive of the charity Morden College. He has been a trustee of Blind Veterans UK since 2011.

== Personal life ==
Rutherford-Jones is married to Sarah and has two children: George and Alice.

Military offices
Preceded by Peter Pearson	Commandant of the Royal Military Academy Sandhurst; 2007–2009	Succeeded by Patrick Marriott
Preceded by Mark Mans	Military Secretary; 2009–2011	Succeeded by Andrew Gregory
