= Civil Nuclear Constabulary =

UK specialised police force

- Abbreviation: CNC

Agency overview
- Formed: 1 April 2005; 21 years ago
- Preceding agency: UK Atomic Energy Authority Constabulary
- Annual budget: circa £100m

Jurisdictional structure
- National agency (Operations jurisdiction): United Kingdom
- Operations jurisdiction: United Kingdom
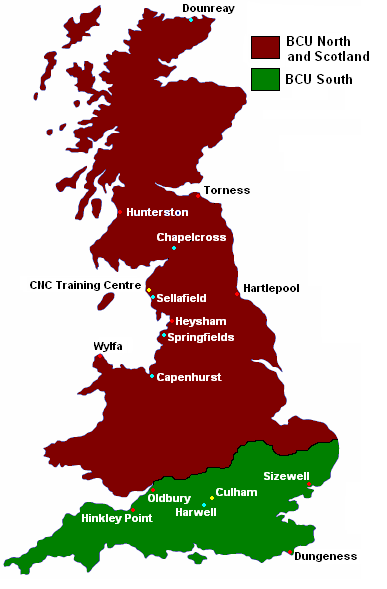
- Map of CNC Divisions
- Legal jurisdiction: Typically within 5km of UK nuclear sites
- General nature: Civilian police

Operational structure
- Headquarters: Culham Science Centre; Abingdon; OX14 3DB
- Sworn members: over 1,500
- Agency executives: Simon Chesterman, chief constable; Stephen Martin, deputy chief constable
- Divisions: 2

Facilities
- Stations: 14

Website
- www.gov.uk/government/organisations/civil-nuclear-constabulary

The Civil Nuclear Constabulary (CNC) (Welsh: Heddlu Sifil Niwclear) is a special police force responsible for providing law enforcement and security at any relevant nuclear site and for security of nuclear materials in transit within the United Kingdom. The force has over 1,500 police officers and support staff. Officers within the force are authorised firearms officers due to the nature of the industry the force protects.

The CNC was established on 1 April 2005, replacing the former Atomic Energy Authority Constabulary established in 1955, and is overseen by the Civil Nuclear Police Authority.

== Role ==
The core role of the CNC is to provide armed policing and security for civil nuclear establishments and materials throughout the United Kingdom and to maintain a state of readiness against any possible attack on a licensed nuclear site. The CNC is established in Chapter 3, sections 51–71, of the Energy Act 2004. The act sets up the Civil Nuclear Police Authority and the position of chief constable, defines the powers of members of the constabulary, mandates that His Majesty's Inspectorate of Constabulary must inspect the force and amends several other acts. It falls under the remit of the Department for Energy Security and Net Zero instead of the Home Office.

The CNC's Annual Report for 2010–2011 (page 15) states that "...the crime dealt with by officers at civil nuclear sites remains low in volume. The management and investigation of crime does not form any part of the Constabulary's mission statement." Whilst the CNC is a police force, this acknowledgement would suggest the role of a CNC police officer is to provide armed security, rather than primarily being concerned with law enforcement. This role is also evidenced in the number of arrests made by the force annually compared with a territorial police force of a similar number of police officers. In 2016, CNC officers made 24 arrests. This compares to Dorset Police, a force with a similar number of officers who made 7,460 arrests annually in the latest annual figures.

During the year 2010–2011, the CNC made 12 arrests, although two of those people were de-arrested at the scene (one when it was realised that the person was not wanted on warrant after all and another where it was decided that police action was not appropriate in relation to an alleged assault).

From 1 October 2012 to 31 March 2019, the chief constable of the CNC was retired Brigadier Michael Griffiths. Deputy Chief Constable Simon Chesterman, formerly of Thames Valley Police, who is also the National Police Chiefs' Council lead for firearms policing, took over as chief constable.

Unlike the territorial police forces, all frontline CNC officers are routinely armed while carrying out duties. CNC officers also operate the armament on board the ships of the Pacific Nuclear Transport Limited, a subsidiary of International Nuclear Services, which specialises in transporting spent nuclear fuel and reprocessed uranium on behalf of its ultimate parent, the Nuclear Decommissioning Authority. Such ships have an onboard escort of armed police.

The CNC is authorised to carry out covert intelligence operations against anti-nuclear protesters. In July 2009, Judge Christopher Rose said the CNC's "approach to covert activity is conspicuously professional". He found that the system for storing the intelligence gained from informers was "working well" and that "senior officers regard covert surveillance as a long-term requirement".

== Legal jurisdiction ==
- Any place when escorting nuclear materials in transit
- Any place when pursuing or detaining subjects who have unlawfully removed or interfered with materials guarded by the CNC, or have been reasonably suspected of being guilty of doing so
- Civil nuclear sites
- Land around such sites up to 5 km (3.1 miles) from the boundary
- Shipyards when safeguarding such nuclear materials

The below section 'Mutual aid' details when this jurisdiction can be extended in support of other forces.

== Locations ==
The CNC operates at a total of fourteen sites in England and Scotland. Of these, two are classed as Operational Policing Units, while eight are Support Units and four Gas Plants which all have an overt armed police presence.

CNC Headquarters

- Culham

Operational Units

- Dounreay
- Sellafield

Support Units

- Dungeness
- Hartlepool
- Heysham
- Hinkley Point
- Hunterston
- Sizewell
- Torness
- Harwell

Gas Plants

- St Fergus
- Garlogie
- Easington
- Bacton

In 2007, the CNC adopted a structure similar to other police forces when it introduced three Basic Command Units, each headed by a superintendent, based around the geographical locations it polices. This has now changed to two units, each headed by a chief superintendent as follows:

- A Division – responsible for nuclear sites Dounreay and Sellafield, along with the Strategic Escort Group.
- B Division – Headquarters Culham, CLD (Training). Nuclear sites, Hunterston, Torness, Hartlepool, Heysham, Hinkley Point, Sizewell, Dungeness and Harwell. Gas Plants, St Fergus, Garlogie, Easington and Bacton.

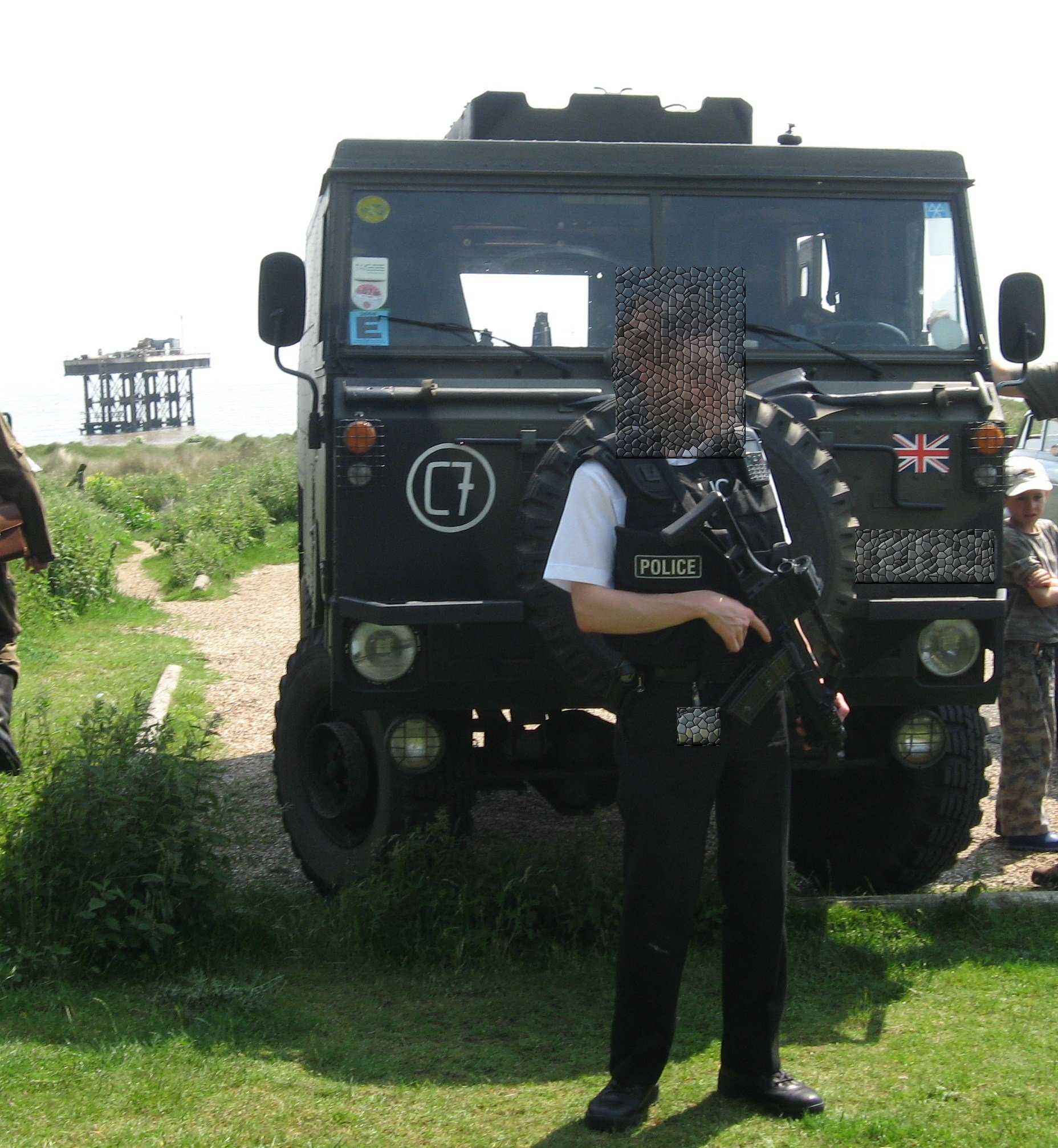
An armed officer of the CNC

== Funding ==
Funding comes from the companies that run ten nuclear plants in the UK. Around a third is paid by the Nuclear Decommissioning Authority, which owns Sellafield. Nearly a fifth of the funding is provided by British Energy, the privatised company owned by EDF. In June 2009, EDF's head of security complained that the force had overspent its budget "without timely and satisfactory explanations to us". The industry acknowledges it is in regular contact with the CNC and the UK security services.

== Mutual aid ==
The CNC is one of the three special police forces of the United Kingdom, the others being the British Transport Police and the Ministry of Defence Police. Unlike these other two forces, the CNC was not included in the provisions setting out 'extended jurisdiction' as per the Anti-terrorism, Crime and Security Act 2001. This allows officers of the MDP and BTP to act outside their natural jurisdiction in certain circumstances.

The CNC is also not included in mutual aid provisions provided by the Police Act 1996 sections 24 and 98 (mutual aid between police forces of England & Wales, Scotland, Northern Ireland and BTP) or Ministry of Defence Police Act 1987 section 3a (mutual aid from MDP). However section 59 of the Energy Act 2004 allows CNC officers to act outside their natural jurisdiction in mutual aid situations under agreements between the chief officer of the CNC and the chief officer of a local police force.

In 2005, officers of the CNC were part of the police operation involving nearly all police forces of the United Kingdom in connection with the G8 conference near Gleneagles, Scotland.

Officers were seconded to Cumbria Constabulary as support during the floods of 2009.

On 2 June 2010, 27 CNC officers were deployed to assist Cumbria Constabulary in the manhunt for the gunman Derrick Bird. Along his route across West Cumbria, Bird killed 12 people and injured 25.

Officers were also deployed to the 2012 London Olympics and 28 officers to a 2014 NATO conference in Wales.

For a period of three months during 2015, 10 CNC officers were seconded to the British Transport Police's Counter Terrorism Support Unit in London. This detachment helped to cover the shortfall in firearms officer numbers in London in the wake of recent terror attacks in major European cities.

On 27 March 2016, The Daily Telegraph, after the Brussels terrorist attacks, stated: "The Home Secretary has announced there will be a "surge" of more than 1,000 new armed police officers deployed across the country in the wake of the terrorist attacks in Brussels. Ms May has also changed the law to enable the 1,000 armed police officers guarding Britain's nuclear power stations to be redistributed in the event of multiple terror attacks."

A press release from the CNC and Home Office details the changes made to enable a greater mutual aid role (dated 7 March 2016). It cites the CNC's Deputy Chief Constable Simon Chesterman: "The signing of this collaboration agreement allows chief constables to formally request and receive CNC AFOs to work under his or her jurisdiction for the time period they require. Currently, CNC officers only have policing powers in a five-kilometre radius of a nuclear site, as laid out in the Energy Act 2004, and this agreement removes that restriction should officers be needed to provide support at any force across the country if circumstances require it."

== See also ==
- List of law enforcement agencies in the United Kingdom, Crown Dependencies and British Overseas Territories
- Law enforcement in the United Kingdom
- Nuclear power in the United Kingdom
