= George Scovell =

British Army officer (1774–1861)

General Sir George Scovell GCB
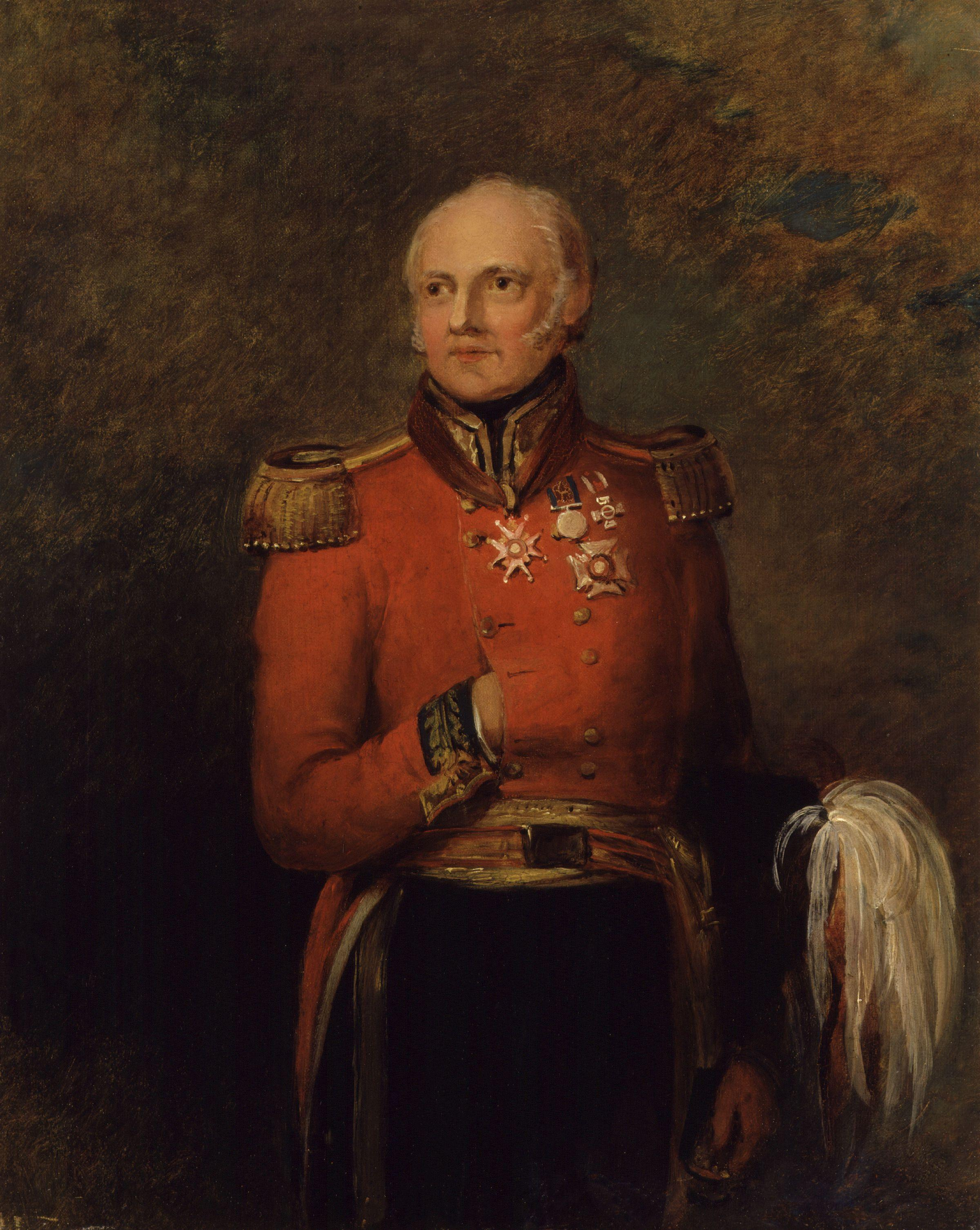
- Portrait by William Salter, 1834–1840
- Born: 21 March 1774; London, England
- Died: 17 January 1861 (aged 86); Guildford, England
- Burial place: Royal Military College, Sandhurst, cemetery
- Military career
- Allegiance: Great Britain; United Kingdom
- Branch: British Army
- Service years: 1798–1861
- Rank: General
- Conflicts: Napoleonic Wars
- Awards: Waterloo Medal; Order of St. Vladimir; GCB
- Other work: Governor of the Royal Military College, Sandhurst

General Sir George Scovell, GCB (21 March 1774 – 17 January 1861) was a British Army officer who served in the Napoleonic Wars.

== Military career ==
Scovell's parents were George Scovell of Cirencester and the daughter of John Fielding. He was commissioned as cornet and adjutant in the 4th Dragoons in 1798.

He served as Deputy Assistant Quarter Master General at the 1809 Battle of Corunna. For his service in the Peninsular War, he received the gold cross with one clasp and the silver war medal with eight clasps.

Scovell is most remembered for the crucial role he played in breaking the codes of the French forces during that war, their Grand Chiffre. A gifted linguist, he was put in charge of a motley crew of various nationalities recruited for their local knowledge and language skills and called the Army Guides. They developed a system for intercepting and deciphering French communiqués.

In the spring of 1811, the French began using a code based on a combination of 150 numbers known as the Army of Portugal Code. Scovell cracked the code within two days. At the end of 1811, a new code called the Great Paris Code was sent to all French army officers. It was based on 1400 numbers and derived from a mid-eighteenth century diplomatic code (Grand Chiffre) which added meaningless figures to the end of letters. By December 1812, when a letter from Joseph Bonaparte to Napoleon was intercepted, Scovell could decipher enough of it to read Joseph's explicit account of French operations and plans. The information gained proved vital to Wellington's victory over the French at Vitoria on 21 June 1813.

In 1813 Scovell was given the task of raising, then commanding, the Staff Corps of Cavalry, also known as the Staff Dragoons or the Corps of Gendarmerie. This formation, of four troops equipped as light dragoons (though in red uniforms), was the first formal unit of military police in the British army. The Staff Dragoons, in addition to their policing role, undertook escort and other staff-related duties and were also employed as combat cavalry on occasion.

For his service at Waterloo, he was awarded the 4th class of the Order of St Vladimir.

Scovell was made a Knight Commander of the Order of the Bath (KCB) on 2 January 1815 and a Knight Grand Cross (GCB) on 18 May 1860. In later life, Scovell became Lieutenant-Governor (1829–1837) and then Governor (1837–1856) of the Royal Military College, Sandhurst.

Scovell retired from the British Army as a general.

He died at Henley Park, Guildford and was buried in the cemetery of the Royal Military College, Sandhurst (now the RMAS).

== Family life ==
Scovell married the daughter of Samuel Clowes of Broughton, Lancashire in 1805.

== Legacy ==
The Memorials to Governors in the Chapel of the present-day Royal Military Academy Sandhurst includes: In Memory of General Sir George Scovell, G.C.B., Colonel of the 4th Light Dragoons. Born 21st March 1774. Died 17th January 1861. He was on the Staff of the Duke of Wellington throughout the Peninsular War, and at Waterloo, and was Governor of this College from 1837 to 1856.

Military offices
Preceded by Sir Edward Paget	Governor of the Royal Military College, Sandhurst; 1837–1856	Succeeded by Sir Harry Jones
Preceded by Sir James Charles Dalbiac	Colonel of the 4th (The Queen's Own) Regiment of (Light) Dragoons; 1847–1861	Succeeded by Sir James Hope Grant
