= Timothy Toyne Sewell =

British Army general

Major-General Timothy Toyne Sewell DL
- Born: 7 July 1941 (age 85)
- Military career
- Allegiance: United Kingdom
- Branch: British Army
- Service years: 1961 – 1994
- Rank: Major-General
- Commands: King's Own Scottish Borderers; 19th Infantry Brigade; RMA Sandhurst

Major-General Timothy Patrick Toyne Sewell DL (born 7 July 1941) is a former British Army officer who became Commandant of the Royal Military Academy Sandhurst.

== Military career ==
Educated at Bedford School and the Royal Military Academy Sandhurst, Toyne Sewell was commissioned into the King's Own Scottish Borderers in 1961. He was appointed commanding officer of 1st Bn King's Own Scottish Borderers in 1981, chief of staff for British Forces in the Falkland Islands 1983 and Commander 19th Infantry Brigade in 1985. He went on to be commander of the British Military Advisory and Training Team in Zimbabwe in 1989 and Commandant of the Royal Military Academy Sandhurst in 1991 before resigning in 1994.

In retirement he became director of Goodenough College in London and then chairman of UWC. He is a deputy lieutenant of London.

== Family ==
He was married in 1965; they have one son and one daughter.

Military offices
| Preceded by Peter Graham | Commandant of the Royal Military Academy Sandhurst; 1991–1994 | Succeeded by Hew Pike |
