= Edmund Gilling Hallewell (British Army officer) =

British Army officer (1822–1869)

Colonel Edmund Gilling Hallewell
- Born: April 1822; Stroud, Gloucestershire
- Died: 1869
- Military career
- Allegiance: United Kingdom
- Branch: British Army
- Rank: Colonel
- Conflicts: Crimean War

Colonel Edmund Gilling Watts Hallewell (April 1822 – 1869) was a British Army officer who became Commandant of the Royal Military College, Sandhurst.

== Early life ==
Hallewell was born the son of Edmund Gilling Hallewell. He married Sophia, the daughter of General Sir William Reid.

== Military career ==
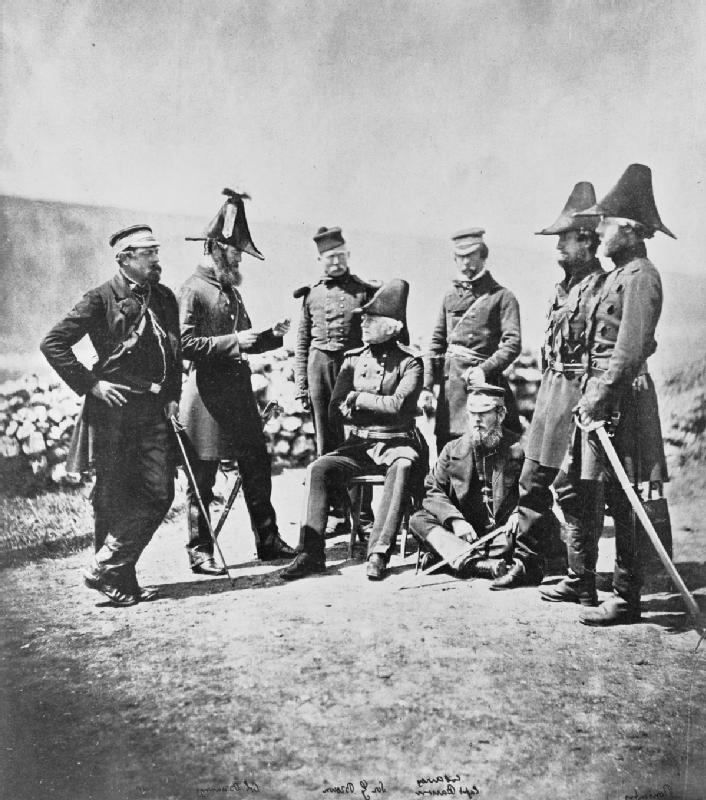
Lieutenant General Sir George Brown G.C.B. & officers of his staff, including Major Hallewell, Sebastopol, Crimean 1855

Educated at Rugby School, Hallewell was commissioned as an ensign in the 28th Regiment of Foot on 31 December 1839. He was promoted to lieutenant in April 1842 and to captain in December 1848. He became Deputy Assistant Quartermaster-General to the Light Division and fought at the Battle of Alma in September 1854, the Battle of Inkermann in November 1854 and at the siege of Sebastopol in Winter 1854 during the Crimean War. He was awarded the French Legion of Honour (Chevalier), the Ottoman Order of the Medjidie, 5th Class and the Sardinian Silver Medal of Military Valor. He was promoted to brevet major in December 1854, to lieutenant-Colonel in November 1855 and to colonel in November 1860. He went on to be Commandant of the Royal Military College, Sandhurst in March 1864.
