= George Walter Prosser =

Colonel George Walter Prosser
- Military career
- Allegiance: United Kingdom
- Branch: British Army
- Rank: Colonel

Colonel George Walter Prosser was a British Army officer who became Lieutenant-Governor of the Royal Military College, Sandhurst.

== Military career ==
Prosser was appointed a captain in the 23rd Light Dragoons on 24 January 1818. He transferred to the 7th Dragoon Guards on 8 August 1822 and was promoted to major in the infantry on 10 June 1826. After writing an essay on the Past and Present State of Fortifications in Europe in 1839 he was selected to become Superintendent of Studies of the Royal Military College, Sandhurst in May 1842 and Lieutenant-Governor of the Royal Military College, Sandhurst in March 1854. He transferred to the 3rd Regiment of Foot on 22 May 1857.
