= Civil Nuclear Police Authority =

The Civil Nuclear Police Authority (Welsh: Yr Awdurdod Heddlu Niwclear Sifil) is the police authority that oversees the Civil Nuclear Constabulary. A police authority is a body corporate in the United Kingdom that defines strategic plans for a police force and provides accountability so that the police function "efficiently and effectively". The authority was created in 2004 by the Energy Act 2004. The authority is subject to freedom of information requests.

== Members ==
The authority has eight members appointed by the Secretary of State for Energy Security and Net Zero: the Chairman, independent members and police advisor member are selected after application and interview, while five members are recommended by the nuclear industry operating companies.

== Powers ==
Through the Civil Nuclear Constabulary the authority is authorised to carry out covert intelligence operations against anti-nuclear protesters. In July 2009 Judge Christopher Rose said the CNC's "approach to covert activity is conspicuously professional". He found that the system for storing the intelligence gained from informers was "working well" and that "senior officers regard covert surveillance as a long-term requirement".
