= International Nuclear Services =

UK government nuclear fuels company

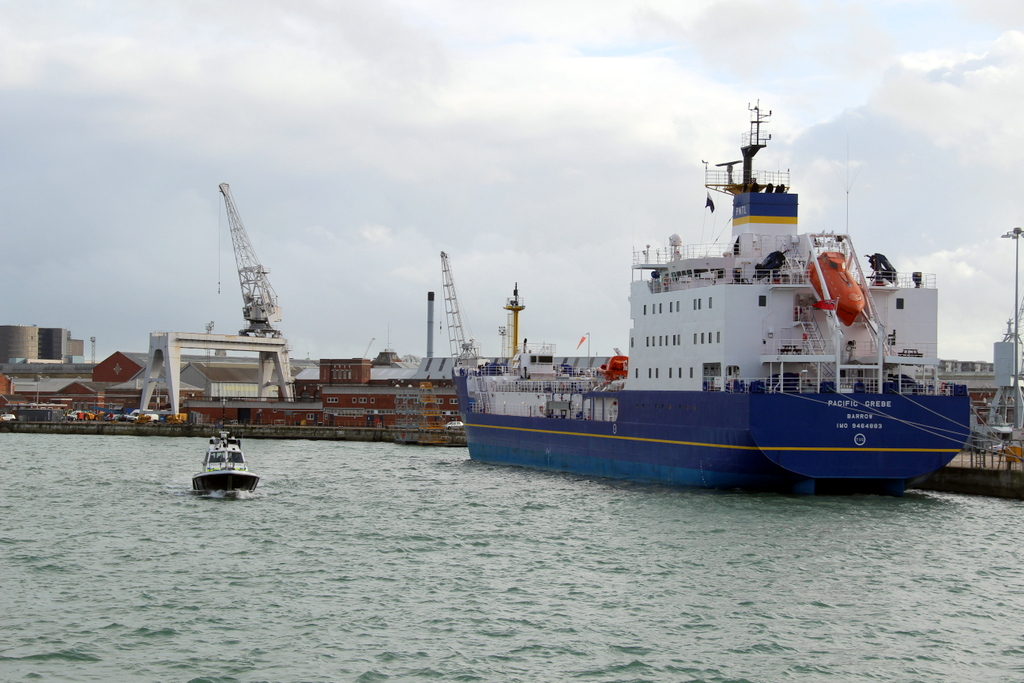
The nuclear transport vessel Pacific Grebe, one of three owned by the INS subsidiary, Pacific Nuclear Transport Limited. Portsmouth, 2012

International Nuclear Services (INS) is a United Kingdom company involved in the management and transport of nuclear fuels. INS is based near Whitehaven, in Cumbria and is operated by Nuclear Transport Solutions, a wholly owned subsidiary of the UK Government's Nuclear Decommissioning Authority (NDA).

== History ==
INS began as the Spent Fuel Services division of British Nuclear Fuels (BNFL). As part of the restructuring of BNFL, 49% of the business was transferred to the NDA in 2006. It was renamed International Nuclear Services in 2007 and in April 2008, as BNFL was wound up, the NDA acquired the remaining 51% of INS.

== Operations ==
INS offers management, consultancy and transport services covering uranium, MOX fuel, irradiated fuel and nuclear waste. It also acts as the NDA's commercial arm, managing contracts for services provided from the NDA's Sellafield and Dounreay sites. As part of this role it works alongside the NDA's Direct Rail Services subsidiary, which transports nuclear materials in the UK by rail.

== Pacific Nuclear Transport Limited ==
INS conducts most of its transport operations through specialist nuclear materials shipping company Pacific Nuclear Transport Limited (PNTL), in which it has a controlling 71.875% stake. PNTL's remaining stake - Japanese Companies – Kansai, JAPC, Marubeni & Sojitz (15.625%) and Orano TN (12.5%). PNTL's fleet is dedicated to carrying nuclear materials and transports most of its cargoes between Europe and Japan.

The fleet of three ships is managed by AW Ship Management. The vessels are armed for self-defence, and carry a contingent of the Civil Nuclear Constabulary on board to operate the armament.
