= List of governors of Plymouth =

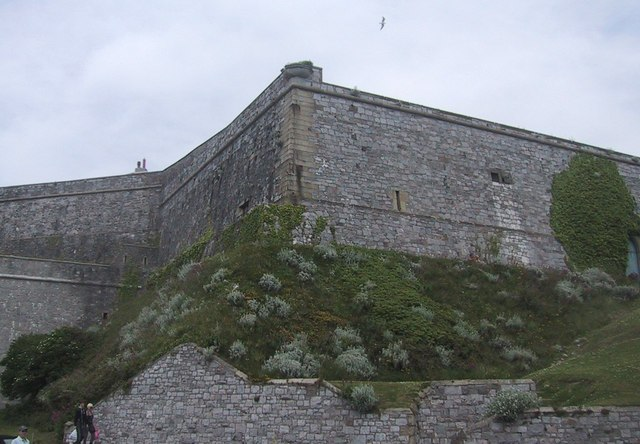
Plymouth Citadel from below

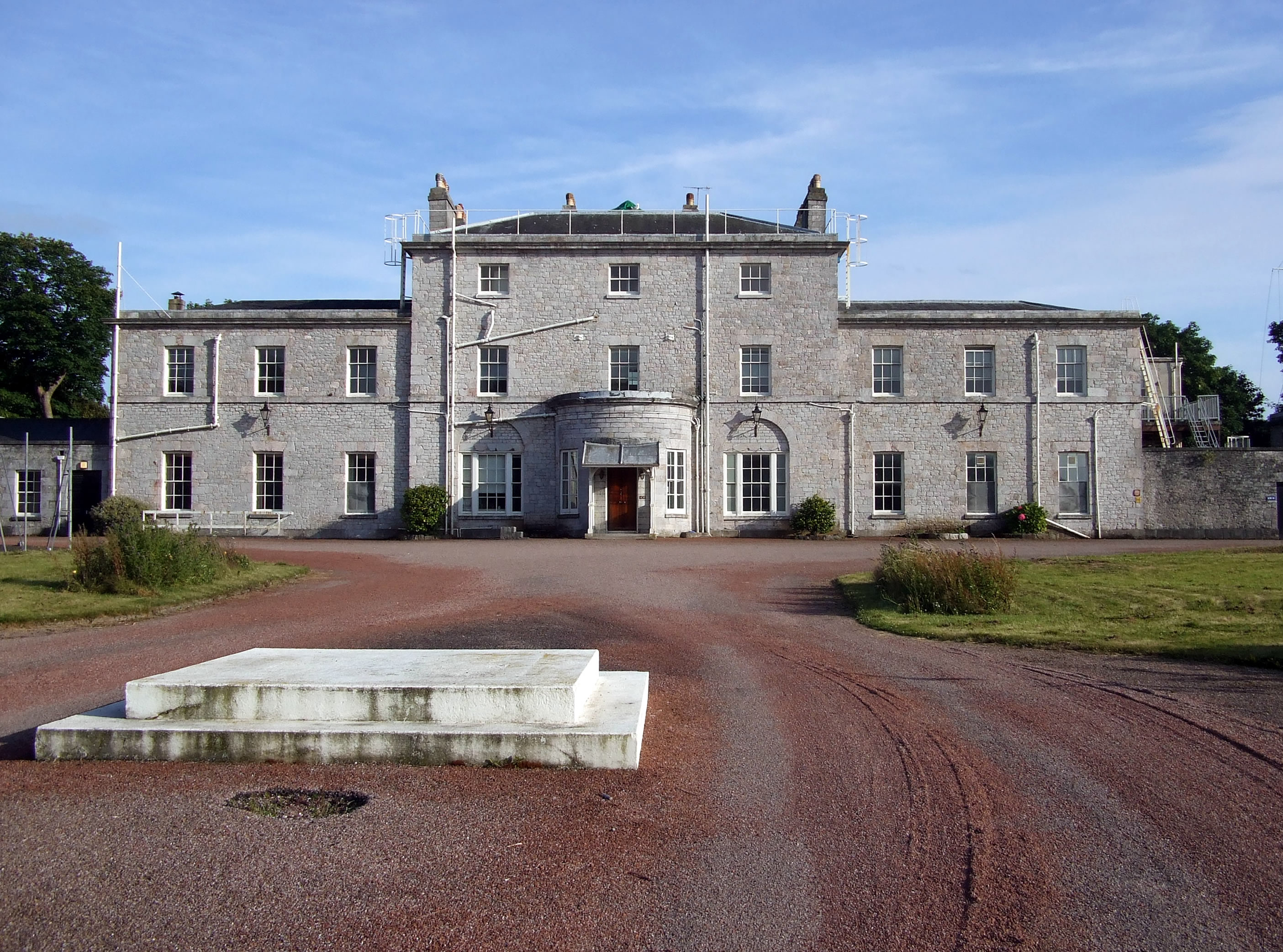
Admiralty House, Mount Wise, Plymouth, built in 1789–93, originally known as Government House, to serve as the home of the military Governor of Plymouth, at the height of fears of a French invasion following the French Revolution (1789)

The Governor of Plymouth was the military Captain or Governor of the Fortress of Plymouth. The Governorship was abolished in 1842. The Lieutenant Governorship was vested in the General Officer Commanding Western District from 1793 to 1903, and in the Officer Commanding Plymouth Garrison from 1903 until that post was abolished.

== Governors of Plymouth ==
- 1596–1601: Sir Ferdinando Gorges (removed from office, 1601)
- 1601–1602: Sir Nicholas Parker
- 1603–1629: Sir Ferdinando Gorges (restored to office)
- 1629–1638: James Bagge (jointly)
- 1638–1643: Sir Jacob Astley
- 1643: William Ruthven (Parliamentarian)
- 1644 (?): Col. William II Gould (1615-1644) of Floyer Hayes, Exeter, after whose tenure "Mount Gould" in Plymouth is named. He was buried at St Andrew's, Plymouth.
- 1645–1645: John Robartes, 2nd Baron Robartes
- 1645–?1659: Ralph Weldon (Parliamentarian)
- 1659–1659: John Desborough
- 1660–1661: Sir William Morice
- 1661–1696: John Granville, 1st Earl of Bath
- 1696–1722: Major General Charles Trelawny
- 1722–1745: Charles Churchill
- 1745–1752: John Murray, 2nd Earl of Dunmore
- 1752–1759: John Ligonier, 1st Viscount Ligonier
- 1759–1760: Richard Onslow
- 1760–1784: John Waldegrave, 3rd Earl Waldegrave
- 1784–1805: Lord George Lennox
- 1805–1807: John Pitt, 2nd Earl of Chatham
- 1807–1808: Gerard Lake, 1st Viscount Lake
- 1808–1814: William Howe, 5th Viscount Howe
- 1814–1819: Charles Lennox, 4th Duke of Richmond
- 1819–1826: Arthur Wellesley, 1st Duke of Wellington
- 1826–1830: William Harcourt, 3rd Earl Harcourt
- 1830–1842: Rowland Hill, 1st Baron Hill

== Lieutenant-Governors of Plymouth ==
- 1746–1748: Lieutenant-General William Blakeney
- 1748–1754: Major Chiverton Hartopp
- 1754–1771: Lieutenant John Williams
- 1771–1782: Lieutenant-Colonel William Blackett
- 1782–1803: Colonel John Campbell
- 1803–1812: Major-General Richard England
- 1812–1819: Major-General Gore Browne
- 1819–1823: Major-General Sir Denis Pack
- 1823–1833: Major-General Sir John Cameron
- 1835–1840: Major-General Sir Willoughby Cotton
- 1840–1842: Major-General Robert Ellice
- 1842–1852: Major-General Sir Henry Murray
- 1853–1854: Major-General Sir Harry Smith, 1st Baronet
- 1855–1859: Major-General George Eden
- 1859–1865: Major-General William Hutchinson
- 1865–1866: Lieutenant-General George Upton, 3rd Viscount Templetown
- 1866–1869: Lieutenant-General Sir Augustus Spencer
- 1869–1874: Major-General Sir Charles Staveley
- 1874–1877: Lieutenant-General Henry Smyth
- 1877–1880: Lieutenant-General Leicester Smyth
- 1880–1883: Lieutenant-General Thomas Pakenham
- 1883–1885: Major-General James Sayer
- 1885–1889: Major-General Thomas Lyons
- 1889–1990: Major-General Sir Howard Elphinstone
- 1890–1895: General Sir Richard Harrison
- 1895–1899: Lieutenant-General Sir Frederick Forestier-Walker
- 1899–1905: Lieutenant-General Sir William Butler
