= General Ward =

General Ward may refer to:

== United Kingdom ==
- Alfred Dudley Ward (1905–1991), British Army general
- Francis Ward (British Army officer) (1840–1919), British Army major general
- Philip Ward (1924–2003), British Army major general
- Richard Ward (British Army officer) (1917–1989), British Army general
- Robert Ward (British Army officer) (born 1935), British Army major general

== United States ==
- Artemas Ward (1727–1800), Continental Army major general
- Durbin Ward (1819–1886), Union Army brevet brigadier general
- H. Marshal Ward (born 1946), U.S. Air Force major general
- J. H. Hobart Ward (1823–1903), U.S. Army brigadier general
- Leonard C. Ward (1917–2001), U.S. Army brigadier general
- Orlando Ward (1891–1972), U.S. Army major general
- William E. Ward (born 1949), U.S. Army four-star general
- William F. Ward Jr. (1928–2018), U.S. Army major general
- William Thomas Ward (1808–1878), Union Army brigadier general

== Other ==
- Frederick Townsend Ward (1831–1862), American-born Qing Imperial Army general

== See also ==
- Anthony Ward-Booth (1927–2002), British Army major general
- John Ward-Harrison (1918–1985), British Army major general
- George Warde (1725–1803), British Army general
- Attorney General Ward (disambiguation)
