= Admiralty House =

Admiralty House may refer to:

- Admiralty House, Sydney, Australia
- Admiralty House, Bermuda, including the four locations that served this function:
  - Rose Hill, Bermuda, St. George's
  - St. John's Hill (later Clarence Hill), a property at Spanish Point, Bermuda
  - Mount Wyndham, Bermuda, above Bailey's Bay
- Admiralty House, in Halifax, Nova Scotia, Canada, now the Naval Museum of Halifax
- Admiralty House, Mount Pearl, Canada, also known as Admiralty House Museum & Archives
- Admiralty House, at Sheerness Dockyard, Kent, England
- Admiralty House, London, England, the residence of the First Lord of the Admiralty, 1788–1964
- Admiralty House, Mount Wise, England (formerly Government House)
- Hamoaze House (Admiralty House from 1809 to 1934), Mount Wise, Plymouth, England
- Het Admiraliteitshuis (The Admiralty House), Dokkum, Finland; see Admiralty of Friesland
- Marble Hall (Hong Kong), from c. 1935–1946
- Great Western Building (Admiralty House from 1770 to 1795), Mumbai, India
- Benedictine Convent (Cobh) (formerly Admiralty House), County Cork, Ireland
- Admiralty House (Valletta), Malta
- Admiralty House, Simon's Town, Cape Town, South Africa
- Admiralty House (Stockholm), Sweden

== See also ==
- Former Admiralty House, Singapore
- Navy House, Trincomalee, Sri Lanka
- Admiralty House Act, a statute of New Zealand
- Admiralty buildings, the complex of which Admiralty House in London is a part
