= Military Knights of Windsor =

Chivalric order

Coordinates: 51°29′0″N 0°36′28″W

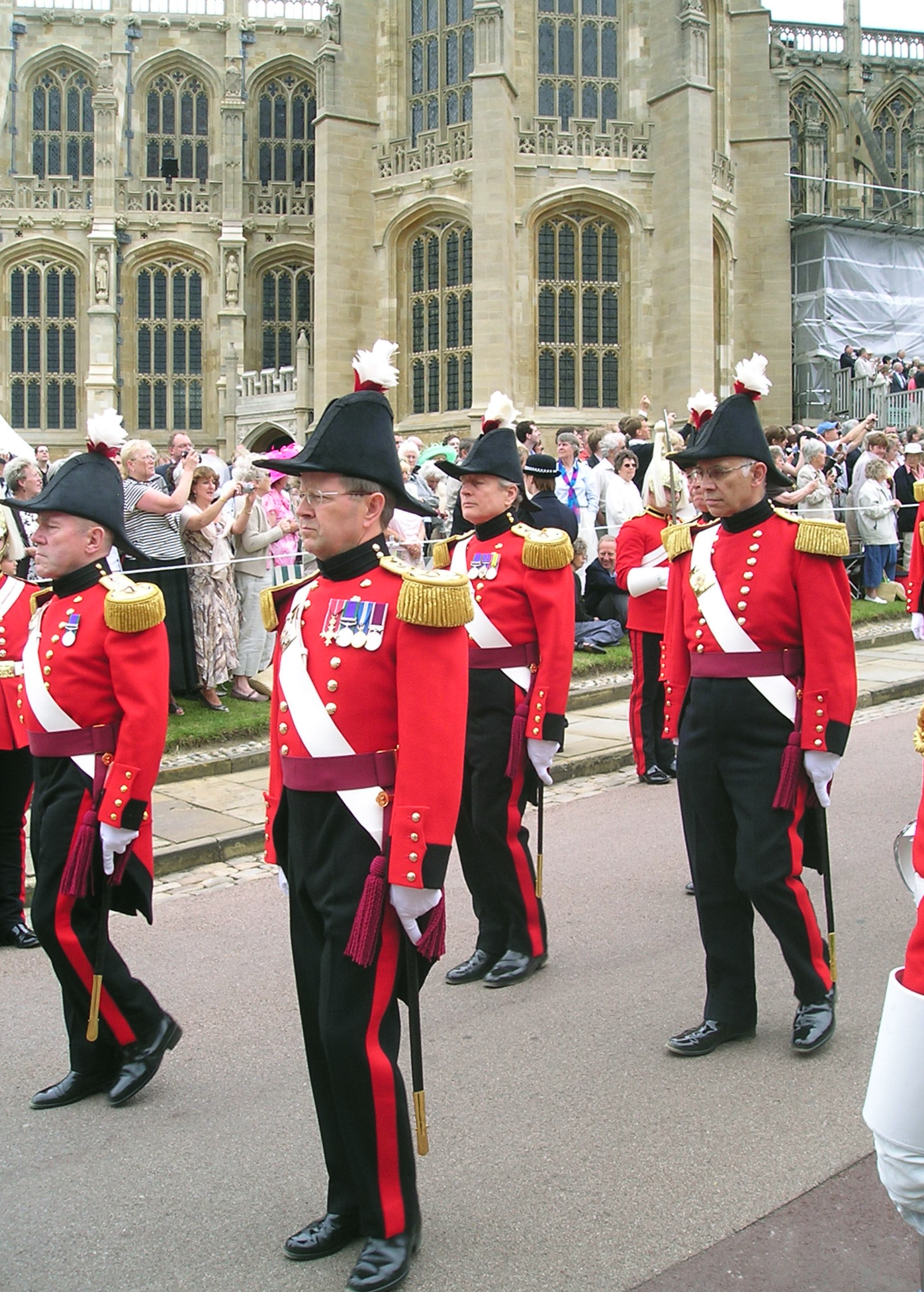
Military Knights of Windsor in the procession to the annual service of the Order of the Garter

The Military Knights of Windsor (who were originally named the Alms Knights and known informally as the Poor Knights) are retired military officers who receive a pension and accommodation at Windsor Castle, to provide support for the Order of the Garter and for the services of St. George's Chapel, Windsor Castle. They are commanded by a senior retired officer, the Governor of the Military Knights of Windsor.

== History ==
The original Alms Knights of St. George's Chapel were constituted by King Edward III following the Battle of Crécy (1346), when many knights captured by the French were forced to liquidate their estates to raise ransom money to fund their release. From its foundation in 1348, the Order of the Garter and its chapel at Windsor (1348) asked veterans to "serve God continually in prayer". In the statutes of the College of St. George's, a community of twenty-six bedesmen, who were named Alms Knights, were appointed. The Alms Knights were a chantry: a religious foundation organised to pray for its patron. Poor Knights were originally impoverished retired military officers. They were required to pray daily for the Sovereign and Knight Companions of the Order of the Garter, and to attend four church services per day: for which they received 12 pennies per day and 40 shillings per year and were accommodated in Windsor Castle. Membership was exclusive to retired military officers whose annual income was less than £20.

King Henry VIII halved their number to thirteen and Elizabeth I re-founded their order in 1559. King Charles II increased their number to eighteen. King William IV renamed them the Military Knights of Windsor in 1833. During the late 19th and early 20th century, they were not required to be poor, and included retired military officers who were members of chivalric orders.

== Governor ==
The office of Governor of the Military Knights of Windsor is part of the Royal Household of the Sovereign of the United Kingdom, and is responsible to the Constable and Governor of Windsor Castle. It was formerly responsible to the Dean of Windsor.

=== List of governors of the Military Knights of Windsor ===
- c.1583: John Moulsworth (Mowlesworth) of Helpston, Northamptonshire (now Cambridgeshire): will dated 7 August 1583, Proved PCC 18 July 1584. Buried at St John the Baptist, New Windsor 2 September 1583
- to 1771: Sir William Wittewronge
- c.1820: Colonel Thomas Bassett
- 1842: Captain John Jonstone Cumming
- 1843: Major Charles Moore
- 1843–1844: Captain Thomas Fernyhough, who died after 6 months in office. He was the first person to be buried in the catacombs beneath St George's Chapel.
- 1867: Major Sir John Paul Hopkins
- 1892: John Douglas Sutherland Campbell, 9th Duke of Argyll
- 1906: Major General Edward Henry Courtney
- 1913: Major General Walter Carteret Carey
- 1932: Lieutenant-General Sir Charles Kavanagh
- 1951: Major General Sir Edmund Hakewill-Smith
- 1978: Major General Sir Peter Gillett
- 1989: Major General Sir Peter Downward
- 2000: Major General Sir Michael Hobbs
- 2012: Lieutenant General Peter Pearson
