= The Queen's Knight (book) =

2007 book by Martyn Downer

The Queen's Knight: The Extraordinary Life of Queen Victoria's Most Trusted Confidant
- Author: Martyn Downer
- Language: English
- Genre: Non-fiction
- Publication date: 2007
- ISBN: 978-0-593-05485-7

The Queen's Knight: The Extraordinary Life of Queen Victoria's Most Trusted Confidant is a book by Martyn Downer published in 2007. It describes the life of Sir Howard Elphinstone who, following the award of the Victoria Cross as a hero of the Crimean War, was handpicked by Queen Victoria and Prince Albert to be governor to their third son Prince Arthur.

According to the author, "Elphinstone made an uncertain beginning at court, settling uncomfortably within its aristocratic cliques and clashing frequently with the impassioned queen. But after Albert's death in 1861, Elphinstone became not only a surrogate father to Arthur, but also Victoria's most trusted confidant."

Martyn Downer's extensive research and access to Elphinstone's diaries and prolific correspondence, including many hundreds of unpublished letters, shed remarkable new light on the Queen's personality and life inside her court.

ISBN 978-0-593-05485-7
