= Attorney General Ward =

Attorney General Ward may refer to:

- Hamilton Ward Jr. (1871–1932), Attorney General of New York
- Hamilton Ward Sr. (1829–1898), Attorney General of New York
- Richard Ward (governor) (1689–1763), Attorney General of the Colony of Rhode Island and Providence Plantations

== See also ==
- General Ward (disambiguation)
