= Western District (British Army) =

- Active: 1793–1905; 1967–1995
- Country: United Kingdom
- Branch: British Army
- Type: District Command
- Garrison/HQ: Government House, Devonport (1793-1905); Copthorne Barracks (1967–1995)

Western District was a command of the British Army.

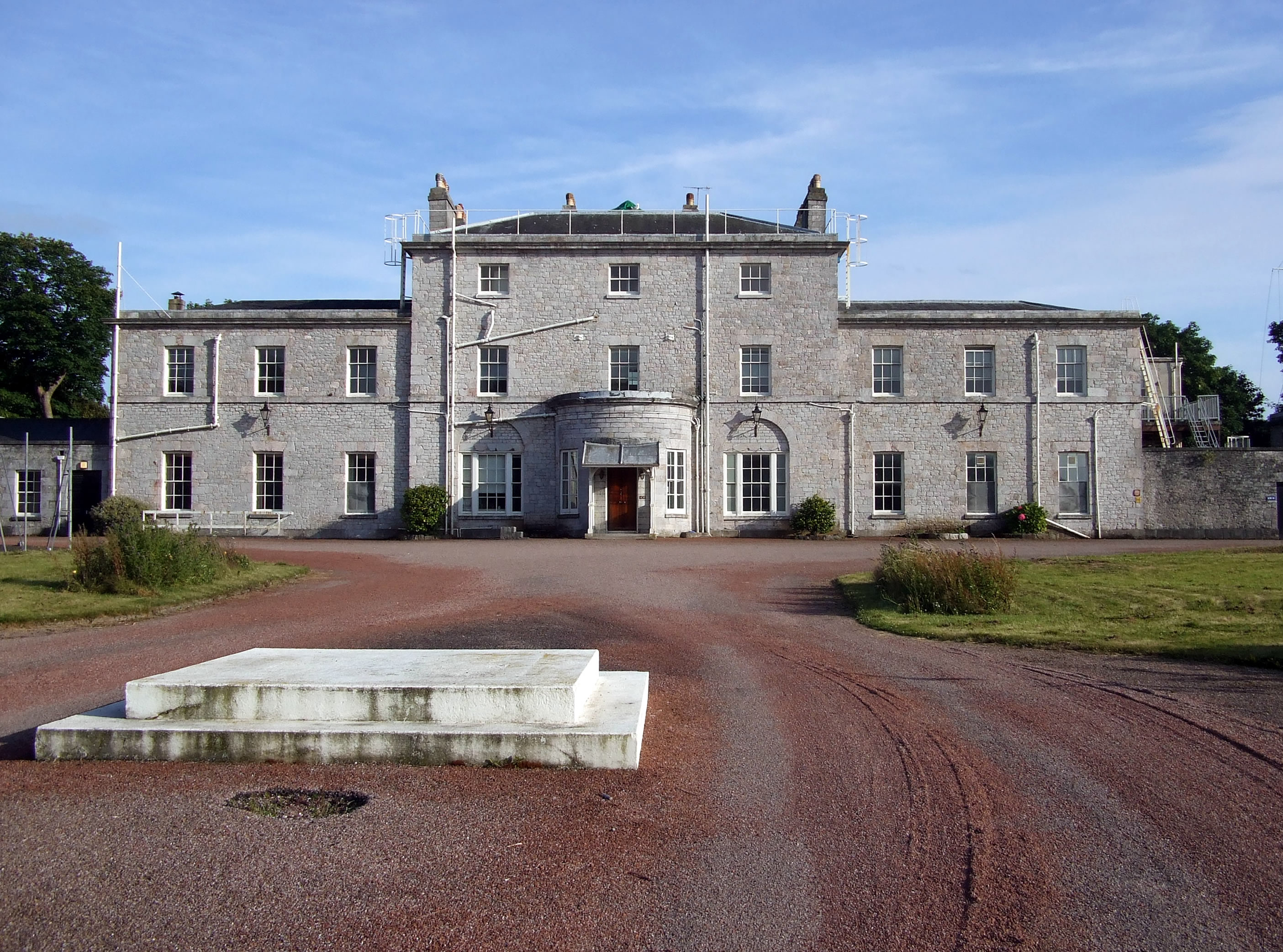
Government House, Devonport, command headquarters from 1793 to 1905

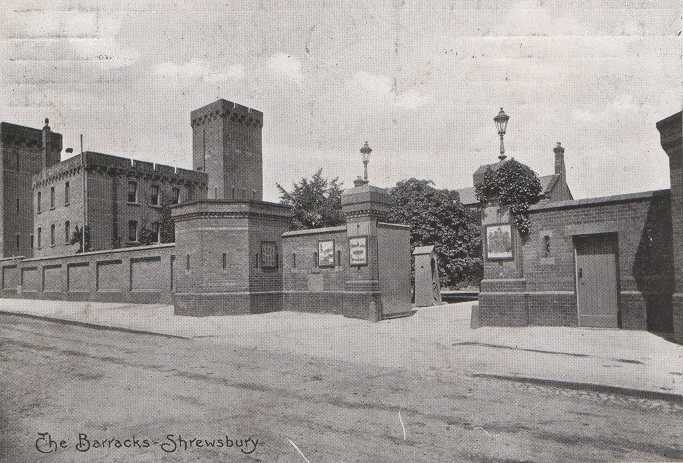
Copthorne Barracks, command headquarters from 1967 to 1995

== History ==
=== Early formation ===
Great Britain was divided into military districts on the outbreak of war with France in 1793. The role of Western District Commander, which was doubled hatted with that of Lieutenant-Governor of Plymouth, was based at Government House, Mount Wise in Devonport. In January 1876 a ‘Mobilization Scheme for the forces in Great Britain and Ireland’ was published, with the ‘Active Army’ divided into eight army corps based on the District Commands. This scheme disappeared in 1881, when the districts were retitled ‘District Commands. By the 1890s the command included the counties of Cornwall, Devon and Somerset and all of South Wales.

In 1901 Western District was grouped with South East District at Dover and Southern District at Portsmouth under Second Army Corps at Salisbury. 2nd Army Corps was renamed Southern Command in 1905.

=== Reformation ===
The district was formed from 48th (South Midland) Division as part of the Territorial Army Volunteer Reserve in 1967. It had its headquarters at Copthorne Barracks, and was placed under the command of HQ UK Land Forces in 1972. In the early 1980s West Midlands District became "Western District". In 1991, the first of the minor districts to be amalgamated were North West District, the former West Midlands District (by then Western District) and Wales, to form a new Wales and Western District. It was disbanded again on the formation of HQ Land Command in 1995.

== General Officers Commanding ==
General officers Commanding included:
Western District

- 1793 – 1803 Colonel John Campbell
- 1803 – 1812 Major-General Richard England
- 1812 – 1819 Major-General Gore Browne
- 1819 – 1823 Major-General Sir Denis Pack
- 1823 – 1833 Major-General Sir John Cameron
- 1835 – 1840 Major-General Sir Willoughby Cotton
- 1840 – 1842 Major-General Robert Ellice
- 1842 – 1852 Major-General Sir Henry Murray
- 1853 – 1854 Major-General Sir Harry Smith
- 1855 – 1859 Major-General George Eden
- 1859 – 1865 Major-General William Hutchinson
- 1865 – 1866 Lieutenant-General Viscount Templetown
- 1866 – 1869 Lieutenant-General Sir Augustus Spencer
- 1869 – 1874 Major-General Sir Charles Staveley
- 1874 – 1877 Lieutenant-General Henry Smyth
- 1877 – 1880 Lieutenant-General the Hon. Leicester Smyth
- 1880 – 1883 Lieutenant-General Thomas Pakenham
- 1883 – 1885 Major-General James Sayer
- 1885 – 1889 Major-General Thomas Lyons
- 1889 – 1990 Major-General Sir Howard Elphinstone
- 1890 – 1895 General Sir Richard Harrison
- 1895 – 1899 Lieutenant-General Sir Frederick Forestier-Walker
- 1899 – 1905 Lieutenant-General Sir William Butler

West Midlands District

- 1967–1968 Major-General Peter Gillett
- 1968–1970 Major-General Graham Mills
- 1970–1973 Major-General James Majury
- 1973–1976 Major-General Robert Britten
- 1976–1979 Major-General Peter Downward

Western District

- 1979–1982 Major-General Anthony Ward-Booth
- 1982–1983 Major-General Richard Keightley
- 1983–1986 Major-General Brendan McGuinness
- 1986–1989 Major-General Robert Ward
- 1989–1991 Major-General Peter Bonnet

Wales and Western District

- 1991–1994 Major-General Michael Regan
- 1994–1995 Major-General Ian Freer
