= Hamoaze House =

Building in Mount Wise, Plymouth

Coordinates: 50.3674°N 4.1718°W

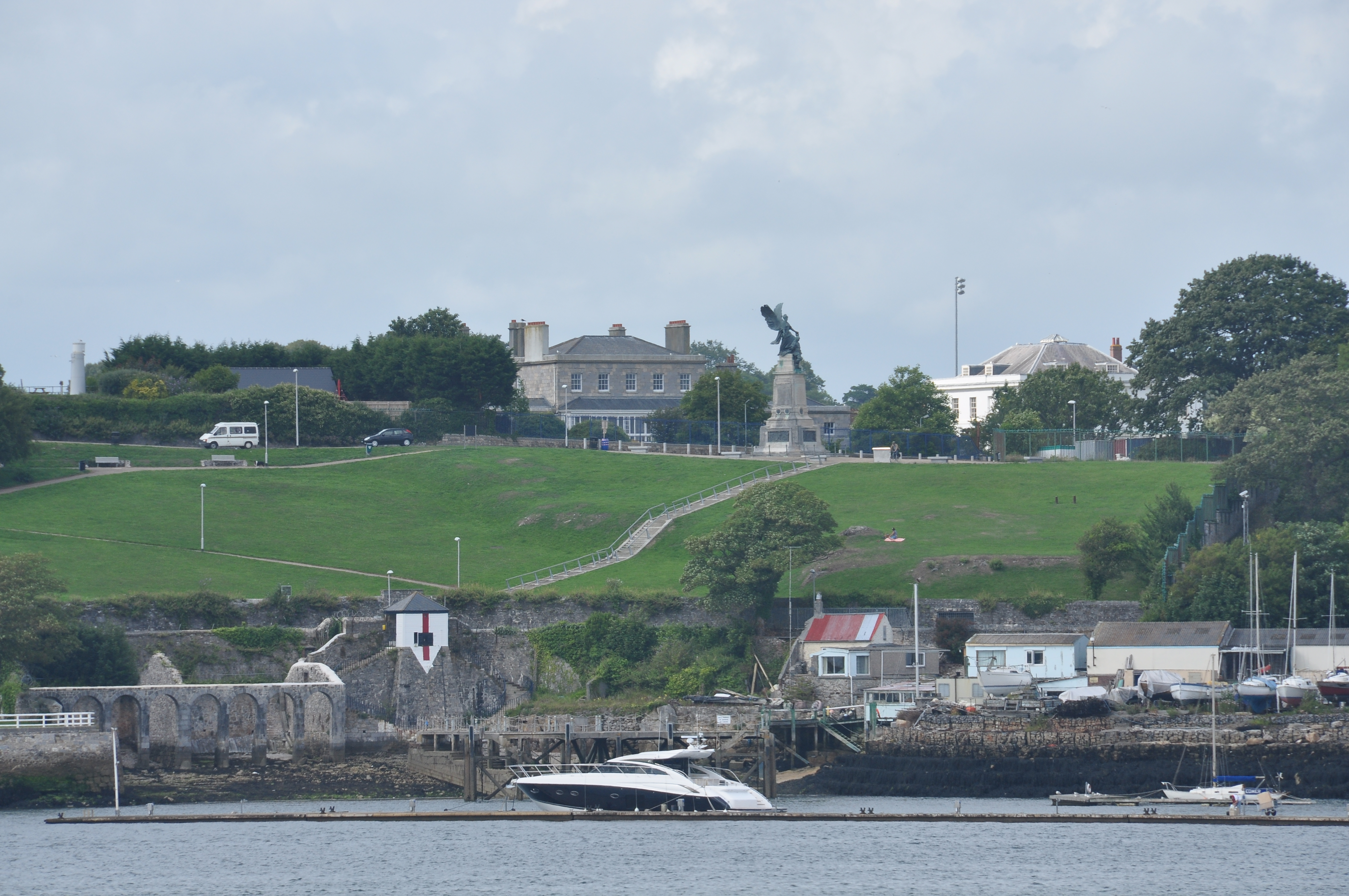
Hamoaze House, formerly Admiralty House, on Mount Wise (centre)

Hamoaze House is a large detached house in Mount Wise, Devonport, Plymouth, built in 1795 as the home of the Commander-in-Chief, Plymouth. It should not be confused with the earlier Admiralty House, Mount Wise (originally known as Government House), built 1789-93 as the home of the military Governor of Plymouth.

It is listed Grade II on the National Heritage List for England.

== History ==
The house was built in 1795 by Charles Lennox, 3rd Duke of Richmond (1735-1806), elder brother of Lord George Lennox (1737-1805), Governor of Plymouth (1784-1805), and served as the home of the Commander-in-Chief, Plymouth from 1809 until 1934 when that officer moved to Government House. It is named after the Hamoaze which is the tidal estuary of the River Tamar. It became the home of the General Officer Commanding the Plymouth Division of the Royal Marines later in 1934. Plymouth Development Corporation marketed the building and arranged its sale to a charitable trust in 1998 and it has since become a centre for drug and alcohol rehabilitation.
