= Richard G. England =

British Army officer (1750–1812)

Lieutenant-General Richard G. England
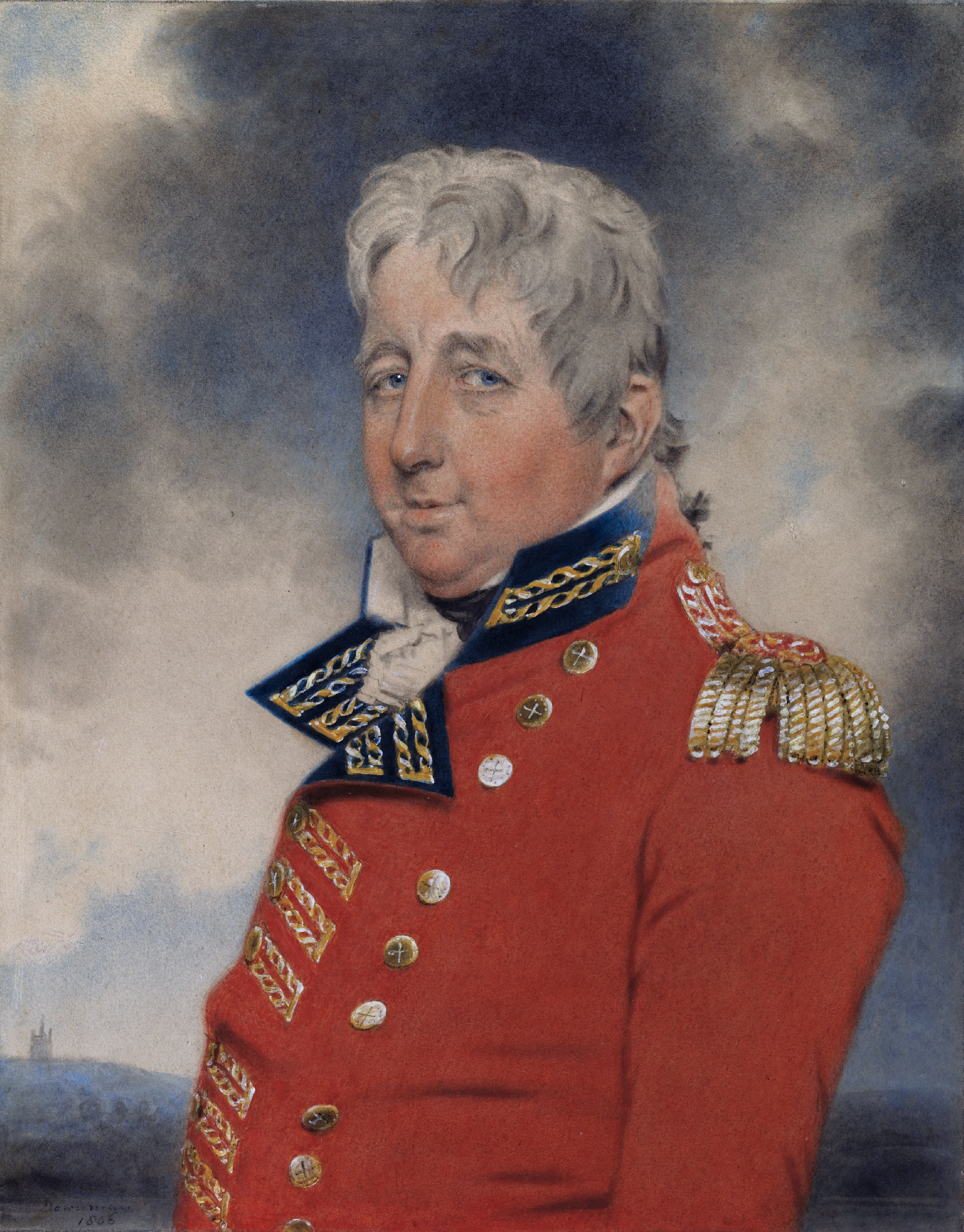
- Portrait by John Downman, 1806
- Born: c. 1750; Ennis, County Clare
- Died: 7 November 1812 (aged 62) London, England
- Allegiance: Great Britain; United Kingdom
- Branch: British Army
- Service years: 1765–1812
- Rank: Lieutenant-general
- Commands: 24th (The 2nd Warwickshire) Regiment of Foot; Western District
- Conflicts: American War of Independence; Battle of Bunker Hill; Battle of Quebec (1775); Battles of Saratoga (POW)

Lieutenant-General Richard G. England (c. 1750 – 7 November 1812) was a British Army officer who served as the lieutenant governor of Plymouth from 1803 to 1812.

== Life ==
Richard G. England was born c. 1750 in Ennis, a town in County Clare. England was commissioned into the British Army's 47th Regiment of Foot at the rank of ensign on 20 November 1765.

During the American War of Independence, England fought at the Battle of Bunker Hill in June 1775, the Battle of Quebec in December 1775 and the Battles of Saratoga in Autumn 1777, where he was taken prisoner by American forces. He remained in American captivity as part of the Convention Army until being exchanged with the rest of the prisoners. Promoted to lieutenant colonel, he became commanding officer of the 24th (The 2nd Warwickshire) Regiment of Foot on 20 February 1783.

He became commandant of Detroit in June 1792 and was one of the first colonists of Western Upper Canada. He went on to be lieutenant-governor of Plymouth and general officer commanding of the Western District in August 1803. He was also colonel of the 5th Regiment of Foot.

Richard G. England was the father of General Richard England, Commanding officer of the 3rd Division in the Crimean War.

Military offices
Preceded by John Campbell	GOC Western District; 1803–1812	Succeeded by Gore Browne
