= James Majury =

British Army general

Major-General James Majury CB MBE
- Born: 26 June 1921
- Died: 4 September 1996 (aged 75)
- Military career
- Allegiance: United Kingdom
- Branch: British Army; British Indian Army
- Service years: 1941−1973
- Rank: Major-General
- Service number: 193883
- Commands: 1st Battalion, Royal Irish Fusiliers; 2nd Infantry Brigade; West Midlands District
- Conflicts: Second World War; Korean War
- Awards: Companion of the Order of the Bath; Member of the Order of the British Empire

Major-General James Herbert Samuel Majury CB MBE (26 June 1921 – 4 September 1996) was a British Army officer.

== Military career ==
Educated at Royal Belfast Academical Institution and Trinity College Dublin, Majury received a wartime commission into the Royal Ulster Rifles in 1941. He was attached to the Indian Army in 1942 and served with the South Waziristan Scouts on the North West Frontier for most of the rest of the Second World War. He returned to the United Kingdom, obtained a regular army commission, and joined the 1st Battalion, the Royal Ulster Rifles in 1947 before being deployed to Korea as part of 29th Infantry Brigade in 1950. He saw action at the Third Battle of Seoul in January 1951 and was taken Prisoner of War by the People's Volunteer Army. He was held in appalling conditions and not released until August 1953.

He became commanding officer of the 1st Battalion Royal Irish Fusiliers in 1961. He went on to be commander of 2nd Infantry Brigade in 1965, Deputy Director of Military Operations at the Ministry of Defence in 1969 and General Officer Commanding West Midlands District in 1972 before retiring in 1973.

In 1948 he married Jeanetta Ann Le Fleming in 1948; they had two sons.

== Interests and business career ==
As a young man he reared and bred racing greyhounds and during World War II, when billeted in Glasgow he attended the Glasgow race tracks. During the 1980s he was appointed the Senior Steward of the National Greyhound Racing Club.

Military offices
Preceded by Graham Mills	GOC West Midlands District; 1972−1973	Succeeded by Robert Britten
