= Denis Pack =

British Army officer

Major-General Sir Denis Pack KCB
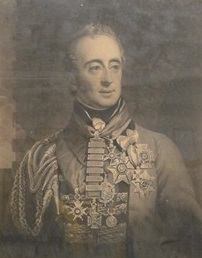
- Born: 7 October 1775
- Died: 24 July 1823 (aged 47); Wimpole Street, London
- Burial place: St Canice's Cathedral, Kilkenny
- Military career
- Allegiance: United Kingdom
- Branch: British Army
- Service years: 1791–1823
- Rank: Major-General
- Commands: 71st Regiment of Foot; 1st Portuguese Brigade, Anglo-Portuguese Army; 1st (Highland) Brigade, 6th Division; 6th Division; Kent District, Home Staff; 9th Brigade, 5th Division; 4th Brigade, Army of Occupation of France; Western District
- Conflicts: French Revolutionary Wars; Flanders Campaign; 1795 Invasion of France; Irish Rebellion of 1798; Napoleonic Wars; Battle of Blaauwberg; British invasions of the River Plate; Walcheren Campaign; Peninsular War; Battle of Roliça; Battle of Vimeiro; Battle of Corunna; Battle of Bussaco; Blockade of Almeida; Siege of Ciudad Rodrigo; Battle of Salamanca; Siege of Burgos; Battle of Vitoria; Battle of Tolosa; Battle of Sorauren; Battle of Nivelle; Battle of the Nive; Battle of Orthes; Battle of Toulouse; Hundred Days; Battle of Quatre Bras; Battle of Waterloo
- Awards: Military Order of the Tower and Sword (Portugal); Military Order of Maria Theresa (Austria); Order of Saint Vladimir (Russia); Army Gold Cross; Waterloo Medal
- Other work: Lieutenant-Governor of Plymouth

Major-General Sir Denis Pack KCB (7 October 1775 – 24 July 1823) was a British Army officer who served in the French Revolutionary and Napoleonic Wars.

== Background ==
A descendant of Sir Christopher Packe, Pack was the son of the Very Reverend Thomas Pack, Dean of Ossory in the east of Ireland. His mother was Catherine, daughter and heiress of Denis Sullivan of Berehaven, Ireland. His tomb is in St Canice's Cathedral in Kilkenny, Ireland near Kilkenny Castle.

== Military career ==
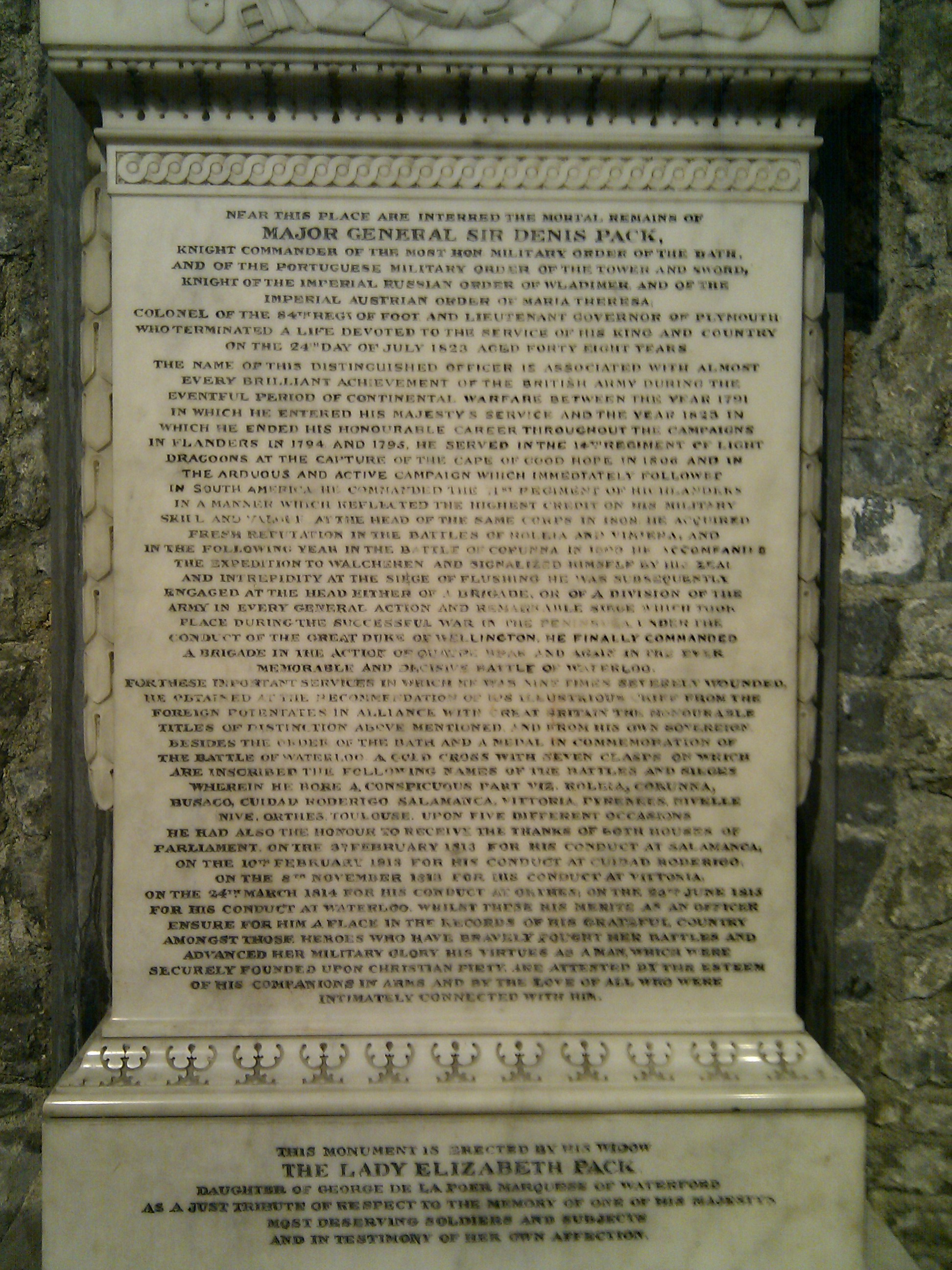
Tomb of Sir Denis Pack, Canice's Cathedral, Kilkenny

Pack saw service in Flanders in 1794, was on the Quiberon expedition of 1795, and in Ireland of the suppression of the 1798 rebellion. He commanded the 71st Foot at the Battle of Blaauwberg in 1806. His regiment served under General William Beresford when he led the first British invasion of the River Plate in June 1806, comprising more than half of Beresford's army, which occupied Buenos Aires with little resistance. However, in August 1806, Santiago de Liniers recaptured the city and took Beresford and his army prisoner, including Pack, who was housed in the Villa of Luján alongside Beresford. Both men assisted by pro-British locals later fled to Montevideo and once there Pack joined General Robert Craufurd's division which carried out the second invasion, although he had sworn an oath never again to take up arms against Spain. The division proceeded to occupy Colonia del Sacramento, which led to the failure of a Spanish attack by Francisco Javier de Elío.

Pack accompanied Craufurd in the Battle of Miserere and in the Spanish attack on British-held Buenos Aires. He occupied the Church of Santo Domingo, where the local resistance forced him to stay; there Pack found a colour of the 71st Foot but, despite his efforts was overcome by the tenacity of the Spanish attack. He tried to abandon his position and the city, but was forced to surrender once again. A group of locals attempted to execute Pack for perjury, but Dominican friars protected him until he was delivered to General John Whitelocke. He was in the Peninsular War in 1808, and the Walcheren expedition in 1809.

During the Peninsular War he was present at the battles of Roliça, Vimiero, A Coruña, Bussaco, Ciudad Rodrigo, Salamanca, Vitoria, the Pyrenees, Nivelle, Nive, Orthez and Toulouse. His Peninsular Gold Medal had seven clasps. Pack was promoted to major-general in 1813 and commanded (1810–14) the Oporto Brigade of the Portuguese Army in Spain. He was made a Knight Commander of the Order of the Bath in 1815 and commanded the 9th Brigade of Sir Thomas Picton's 5th Division at the Battle of Waterloo. He became Lieutenant-Governor of Plymouth and General Officer Commanding Western District in 1819. His widow Lady Elizabeth Pack married his friend and fellow officer Lt Gen Thomas Reynell.

== Notes ==
Military offices
Preceded by Gore Browne	GOC Western District; 1819–1823	Succeeded by Sir John Cameron
Preceded by Sir George Walker, Bt	Colonel of the 84th (York and Lancaster) Regiment of Foot; 1822–1823	Succeeded by Sir Fitzroy Maclean, Bt
