= 1797 Rugby School rebellion =

Mutiny of the boys at Rugby school

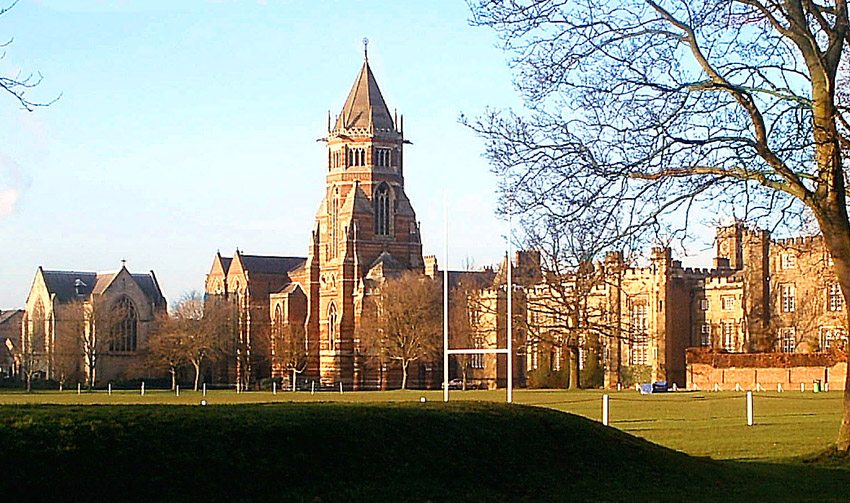
Rugby School in 2004

The 1797 Rugby School Rebellion was a mutiny of the boys at Rugby School after the headmaster, Dr Henry Ingles, demanded that boys from the fifth and sixth forms should pay for the repair of a local tradesman's windows after they had been smashed by the school's pupils. The rebellion saw many of the school windows broken and its furniture burnt before the boys withdrew to an island on the school grounds. A local justice of the peace read the Riot Act, while soldiers crossed the island's moat from the rear and took the boys prisoner.

The rebellion was only one of several that took place at Rugby. The school was not alone in seeing disruption: several other public schools also saw trouble between 1710 and 1832.

== Rugby School and discipline in 18th century public schools ==
Rugby School—founded in 1567—was one of the original seven public schools, along with Winchester, founded in 1382; Eton College, founded in 1440; Shrewsbury, founded in 1552; Westminster, founded in 1560; Harrow, founded in 1571; Charterhouse, founded in 1611.

Discipline at public schools in the 18th and 19th centuries was poor. According to the sociologists Kenneth Sheard and Eric Dunning, the reason lay in the balance of power between pupils and masters. Because the children of the upper class had previously been educated at home by tutors, these took the position of paid staff, and were therefore seen as socially inferior by their pupils. Sheard and Dunning consider that the tutors, "confronted with pupils who were aristocrats and gentlemen, ... became hesitant and uncertain in the execution of their role".

At its worst, the breakdown in discipline led pupil rebellions at several institutions. In 1710 the pupils of Winchester rebelled over their beer ration. The school further rebelled in 1770, 1774, 1788 and 1793; Eton revolted in 1728, 1768 and 1783; Harrow had their protest in 1771; and Rugby's first revolt came in 1786. Some were peaceful—the first Eton rebellion had been a walk-out by pupils with no violence—others were accompanied by threats, violence and damage to the school.

At the time of the rebellion, Rugby's headmaster was Dr Henry Ingles. He was appointed to the position in 1794 after having been the headmaster at Macclesfield School. A gloomy man and a strict disciplinarian, the pupils nicknamed him the Black Tiger.

== November 1797 ==
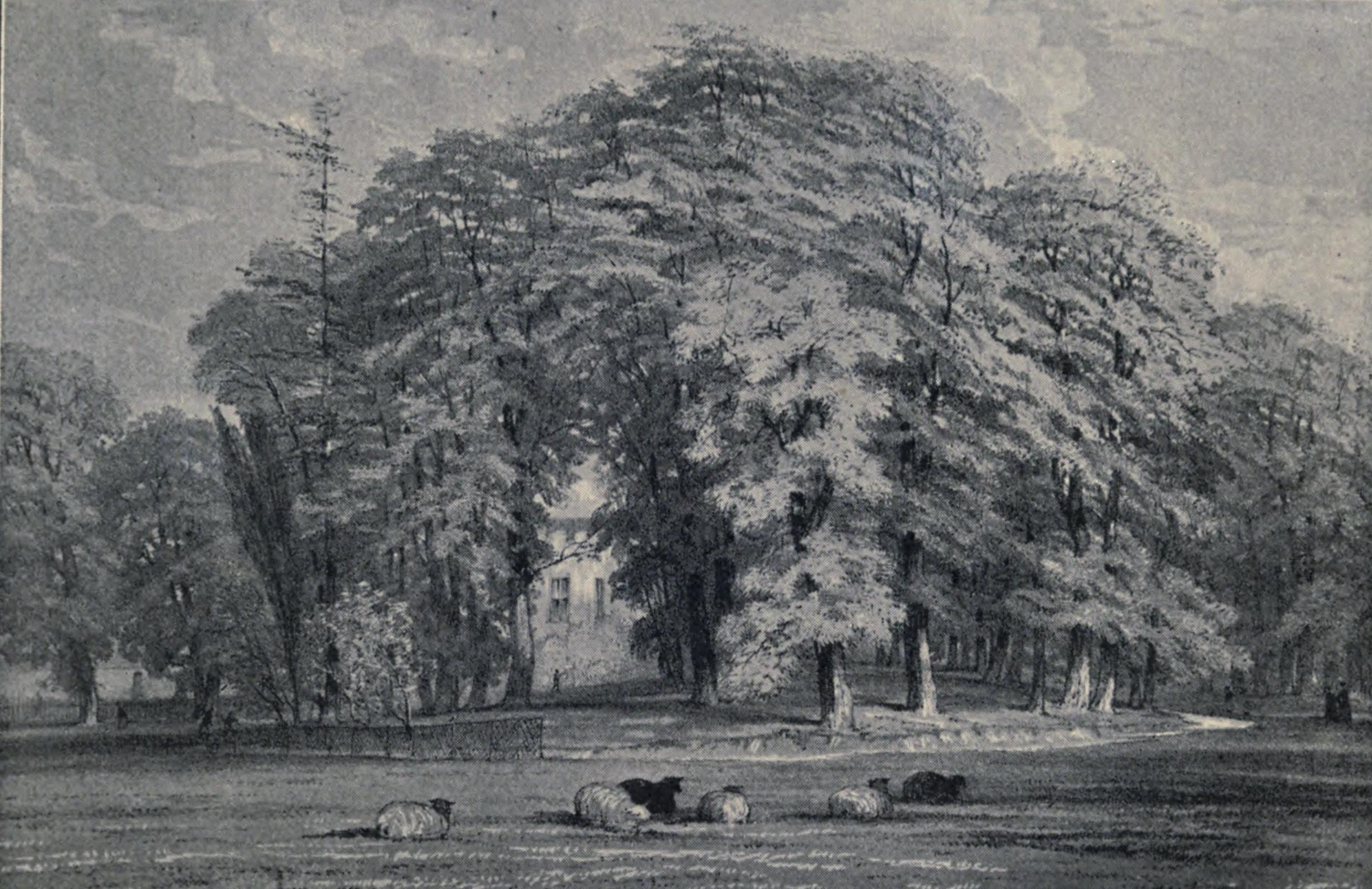
The Island, a Bronze Age burial mound, at Rugby School

In November 1797 Ingles found Astley, a pupil from Gascoigne's boarding house, firing cork bullets at the study windows of Mr Gascoigne, the housemaster. Ingles asked the boy where he had purchased the gunpowder, and was informed it was from Rowell's, a local outlet that combined a grocers, booksellers and ironmongers. When Ingles confronted Rowell, the shopkeeper denied selling the powder and showed Ingles his sales book, in which the sale had been recorded as tea. Ingles took the shopkeeper's word over that of Astley, and the boy was flogged for lying. Astley told his friends about the flogging and the reason for it. Angered, Astley's friends smashed the windows of Rowell's.

When Ingles heard of the vandalism, he said that all the members of the fifth and sixth forms would pay for the damage. The boys drew up a round robin response—hiding the identity of the ringleaders—in which they refused to pay. (Note: A "round robin" is a document in which the signatures are written in a circle, in order to give none any prominence.) The headmaster threatened punishment as a result. That Friday, after fourth lesson, (Note: Fourth lesson would have finished either at 4 or 5 pm.) the boys placed a home-made petard—a small bomb used to blow open doors—against a school door, which was blown off its hinges. (Note: The door in question is given either as that of School House, one of the boarding houses, or Ingles's classroom door.)

The following day the school bell was rung by the boys to signal the next part of the rebellion; at the same time fags were sent to the boarding houses to rally boys to the main school building. The windows of the main building were all broken and the school's furniture—including its wainscot panelling—were thrown into the Close, the large main field in front of the school, where it was set alight. Also added to the pile were Ingles's books; Billy Plus, the school butler rescued some of the more expensive copies from the fire. The passage between School House, one of the boarding houses, and the main school building was nailed shut by the boys to stop Ingles—who lived in the boarding house—gaining access into the school.

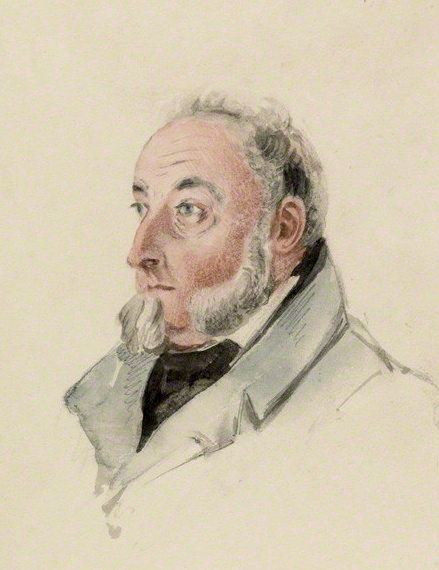
Willoughby Cotton, one of the ringleaders, in later life.

As Saturday afternoons were free of lessons, many of the masters had already left the school grounds. Ingles sent messages for them to return, but most were too far away to be found (two were fishing in the River Avon, another was out shooting rabbits). Ingles sent a message to Mr Butlin, a local banker and the town's justice of the peace. It was market day in Rugby, so Butlin asked the horse-dealers, with their long droving whips to assist. He also asked an army recruitment party, headed by a sergeant, for their assistance. An armed guard, with fixed bayonet, was placed at School House, and the remainder of the soldiers, together with the horse-dealers and special constables, approached the Close.

The rebellious schoolboys left the bonfire of furniture, and retreated to "the Island", a Bronze Age burial mound on the side of the Close, surrounded by a water moat, up to 6 feet (1.8 m) deep and 20 to 30 feet (6.1 to 9.1 m) wide; after crossing the ditch, the boys drew up the wooden drawbridge. While Butlin distracted the boys, by reading them the Riot Act, the soldiers circled round behind them and crossed the moat on the opposite side and took them prisoner.

== Aftermath ==
Ingles had locked himself into School House while the events unfolded, but he emerged at the conclusion of the event. He immediately expelled the ringleaders and had many others flogged. One of the ringleaders was subsequently identified as Willoughby Cotton who entered the army shortly afterwards and led troops in Jamaica to put down a slave rebellion in 1831; of those expelled, one later became a bishop, another a marquess.

The rebellion was not the last to occur in public schools, nor even at Rugby: the school was the location of further revolts by the boys in 1820 and 1822. Between 1797 and 1832 there were ten further rebellions in schools, four at Eton, three at Winchester and one each at Charterhouse, Harrow and Shrewsbury.

== Notes and references ==
=== Sources ===
- Adams, Matthew (2016). Teaching Classics in English Schools, 1500-1840. Newcastle upon Tyne: Cambridge Scholars Publishing. ISBN 978-1-4438-8769-4.
- Bloxam, Matthew (1889). Rugby: The School and the Neighbourhood. London: Whittaker & Co. OCLC 557371182.
- Bradby, H. C. (1900). Rugby. London: George Bell & Sons. OCLC 826178165.
- Chandos, John (1984). Boys Together: English Public Schools, 1800–1864. New York and London: Yale University Press. ISBN 978-0-300-03215-4.
- Chichester, H. M.; Lunt, James (2011). "Cotton, Sir Willoughby (1783–1860)". Oxford Dictionary of National Biography (online ed.). Oxford University Press. doi:10.1093/ref:odnb/6434. (Subscription, Wikipedia Library access or UK public library membership required.)
- Dunning, Eric; Sheard, Kenneth (2005). Barbarians, Gentlemen and Players: A Sociological Study of the Development of Rugby Football. Abingdon, Oxfordshire: Routledge. ISBN 978-0-7146-5353-2.
- Hardy, H. H. (1911). Rugby. London: Sir Isaac Pitman & Sons. OCLC 2150234.
- Honey, John (1989). "The Sinews of Society: The Public Schools as a 'System'". In Müller, Detlef; Ringer, Fritz; Simon, Brian (eds.). The Rise of the Modern Educational System: Structural Change and Social Reproduction 1870-1920. Cambridge: Cambridge University Press. ISBN 978-0-521-36685-4.
- "Petard". Oxford English Dictionary (online ed.). Oxford University Press. (Subscription or participating institution membership required.)
- "Round Robin". Oxford English Dictionary (online ed.). Oxford University Press. (Subscription or participating institution membership required.)
- Rouse, W. H. D. (1898). A History of Rugby School. London: Duckworth & Co. OCLC 932974800.
- "Rugby School – History". Rugby School.
- Staunton, Howard (1865). The Great Schools of England: An Account of the Foundation, Endowments, and Discipline of the Chief Seminaries of Learning in England. London: Sampson Low, Son and Marston. OCLC 249983144.
- Turner, David (2015). The Old Boys: The Decline and Rise of the Public School. New Haven, CT: Yale University Press. ISBN 978-0-300-21313-3.
- "A Visit to Rugby". Blackwood's Magazine. 91 (559): 537–564. May 1862.
