= Willoughby Cotton =

British Army general

Lieutenant-General Sir Willoughby Cotton GCB KCH
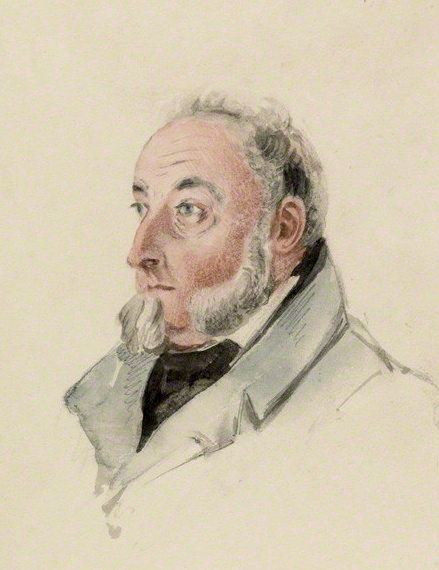
- Sir Willoughby Cotton, by James Atkinson
- Born: 1783
- Died: 4 May 1860 (aged 77)
- Military career
- Allegiance: United Kingdom
- Branch: British Army
- Service years: 1798–1854
- Rank: Lieutenant-General
- Commands: The forces in Jamaica (1829–1834); Western District (1835–1840); Bombay Army (1847–1850)
- Conflicts: Napoleonic Wars; Peninsular War; Waterloo Campaign; First Anglo–Burmese War; Great Jamaican Slave Revolt; First Anglo-Afghan War
- Awards: Knight Commander, Hanover Order; Knight Grand Cross of the Order of the Bath; Military General Service Medal with 3 Clasps (Burgos, Vittoria, Nive); Army of India Medal with AVA clasp Ghuznee Medal; Mentioned in Despatches; Order of the Dooranee Empire

Lieutenant-General Sir Willoughby Cotton GCB KCH (1783 – 4 May 1860) was an English soldier in the British Army.

== Family ==
Willoughby Cotton was born in 1783, to Vice-Admiral Rowland Cotton and Elizabeth Aston. They also had a daughter, Sydney Arabella Cotton. Rowland Cotton was from a well-established Chester family, was the second son of Sir Lynch Cotton, 4th Baronet, while Elizabeth was the eldest daughter of Sir Willoughby Aston, 5th Baronet Aston, of Aston, Chester.

Cotton married Lady Augusta Maria Coventry on 16 May 1806 in Marylebone, London. They had three children together, Augusta Mary Cotton, Willoughby Cotton and Maj.-Gen. Corbet Cotton.

== School years ==
Willoughby Cotton entered Rugby School at the age of 12 in 1795. Cotton, aged 14, was a ringleader in the "Great Rebellion" of November 1797. Aggrieved by the attitude of the Head Master, Dr. Henry Ingles (1794–1806), following the breaking of a window, students blew his classroom door off with gunpowder and followed this by burning desks and books upon the close, before retreating to the Island (a Bronze Age burial mound surrounded by a moat). Ingles called in the local militia, whereupon the Riot Act was read and the Island taken. Soldiers stole round to the rear, and wading across the moat, drawn sword in hand, took the whole party prisoner. Cotton was among the students to be expelled as a result of this confrontation.

== Military career ==
Cotton was commissioned into the 3rd Regiment of Foot Guards' 1st Battalion at the rank of ensign on 31 October 1798. He quickly gained his Lieutenancy, on 25 November 1799 and took part in Lord Cathcart's Hanover Expedition in 1805. The 1st Battalion and Cotton were also involved in the 1807 Copenhagen Expedition, again commanded by Lord Cathcart. Cotton was appointed Adjutant-General to the reserve under the Command of Arthur Wellesley (soon to become the Duke of Wellington) and was involved in the Battle of Køge on 29 August 1807.

Cotton was deployed to the Iberian Peninsula in April 1809, where he served as Adjutant-General to the Light Division under Brigadier-General Robert Craufurd. Cotton was present throughout the retreat to the lines of Torres Vedras and subsequent advance, seeing action at the Battle of Côa. On 12 June 1811 he attained the rank of Lieutenant-Colonel in the Third Guards and then returned to England in August. Cotton returned to the Peninsula in April 1813 and was involved in the Capture of Burgos on 10–12 June, which is different from the unsuccessful Siege of Burgos in 1812. He was then present at the decisive battles of Vittoria on 21 June 1813 and Nive on 9–13 December. Cotton then served in France, commanding the Light Division during the Passage of Adour on 23 February 1814. He was involved in the Siege of Bayonne and commanded the piquets of the Second Brigade of Guards on the night of the French Sortie, 14 April 1814. It was during the French sortie that, according to the writings of fellow Guards officer Captain Gronow, Cotton was taken prisoner. He "escaped by giving up his watch and all the money” on him, receiving a beating for “the smallness of the sum." Cotton returned to England with the First Battalion of the Third Guards in April 1814, but returned to France in June 1815 due to the loss of Second Battalion Officers at the Battle of Waterloo.

During his career, Cotton played major roles in the First Anglo-Burmese War in 1824 to 1826, the 1831–32 slave revolt in Jamaica and the First Anglo-Afghan War from 1839 to 1842. He became the Lieutenant-Governor of Plymouth and General Officer Commanding Western District in 1835 and was Commander-in-chief of the Bombay Army from April 1847 until he retired in December 1850 and was invested as a Knight Grand Cross, Order of the Bath. He was also groom of the bedchamber to the Duke of Gloucester.

== In fiction ==
Cotton, appears as a character in George MacDonald Fraser's novel Flashman, set during the First Anglo-Afghan War. He is portrayed as a competent general, who is also jovial and popular.

Military offices
Preceded by Sir John Cameron	GOC Western District; 1835–1840	Succeeded by Robert Ellice
Preceded by Sir Thomas McMahon	C-in-C, Bombay Army; 1847–1850	Succeeded by Sir John Grey
Preceded by Sir Richard Armstrong	Colonel of the 32nd (Cornwall) Regiment of Foot; 1854–1860	Succeeded by Sir John Eardley Wilmot Inglis
