= Peter Downward =

British Army general (1924–2014)

Major-General Sir Peter Downward KCVO CB DSO DFC
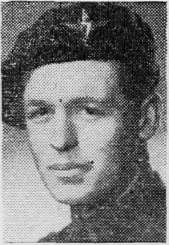
- Born: 10 April 1924; Douglas, Isle of Man
- Died: October 18, 2014 (aged 90)
- Allegiance: United Kingdom
- Branch: British Army
- Rank: Major-General
- Commands: 1st Battalion, Lancashire Regiment; Berlin Infantry Brigade; School of Infantry; Wales and Western District
- Battles / wars: Second World War; Berlin Airlift; Korean War; Aden Emergency
- Awards: Knight Commander of the Royal Victorian Order; Companion of the Order of the Bath; Distinguished Service Order; Distinguished Flying Cross

Major-General Sir Peter Aldcroft Downward KCVO CB DSO DFC (10 April 1924 – 18 October 2014) was a British Army officer.

== Military career ==
Educated at King William's College, Downward was commissioned into the South Lancashire Regiment in 1943 and served in North West Europe during the Second World War. He also took part in the Berlin Airlift in 1949 and later saw action in the Korean War. He became commanding officer of the 1st Battalion the Lancashire Regiment in 1966 and in that role was deployed to Aden during the Aden Emergency. He went on to be commander of the Berlin Infantry Brigade in 1971, commandant of the School of Infantry in 1974 and General Officer Commanding West Midlands District in 1976 before retiring in 1979.

In 1953, he married Hilda Hinckley Wood; they had two sons. Following the death of his first wife, he married Mary Boykett Proctor (née Allwork).

In retirement he was Lieutenant Governor of the Royal Hospital Chelsea, and then Governor of the Military Knights of Windsor. He died on 18 October 2014.

Military offices
Preceded by Robert Britten	GOC West Midlands District; 1976−1979	Succeeded by Anthony Ward-Booth (as GOC Western District)
