= Graham Mills =

British Army officer

Major-General Graham Mills CBE
- Born: 23 June 1917
- Died: 1 January 1992 (aged 74)
- Military career
- Allegiance: United Kingdom
- Branch: British Army
- Service years: 1936−1970
- Rank: Major-General
- Service number: 69270
- Unit: Royal Berkshire Regiment
- Commands: 17th Battalion, Parachute Regiment; 128th Infantry Brigade; West Midlands District
- Conflicts: Second World War; Aden Emergency
- Awards: Commander of the Order of the British Empire

Major-General William Graham Stead Mills, CBE (23 June 1917 – 1 January 1992) was a British Army officer.

== Military career ==
Educated at Merchiston Castle School, Mills was commissioned into the Royal Berkshire Regiment on 10 October 1936. He served in India and Burma during the Second World War. He became commanding officer of the 17th Battalion, Parachute Regiment (TA) at Gateshead in 1958, Commander of 128th Infantry Brigade in March 1963 and Brigadier on the general staff at Headquarters, Arabian Peninsula in 1965 during the Aden Emergency. He went on to be General Officer Commanding (GOC) West Midlands District in April 1968 before retiring in October 1970.

In retirement he was warden at the Le Court Cheshire Home near Liss in Hampshire.

Military offices
Preceded by Peter Gillett	GOC West Midlands District; 1968–1970	Succeeded by James Majury
