= Robert Britten =

British Army officer (1922–1995)

Major-General Robert Britten CB MC
- Born: 28 February 1922
- Died: 11 July 1995 (aged 73)
- Military career
- Allegiance: United Kingdom
- Branch: British Army
- Rank: Major-General
- Commands: 1st Training Regiment Royal Engineers; 30th Engineer Brigade; West Midlands District
- Conflicts: Second World War
- Awards: Companion of the Order of the Bath; Military Cross

Major-General Robert Wallace Tudor Britten CB MC (28 February 1922 – 11 July 1995) was a British Army officer.

== Military career ==
Educated at Wellington College and Trinity College, Cambridge, Britten was commissioned into the Royal Engineers in 1941 during the Second World War. He became commanding officer of 1st Training Regiment Royal Engineers in 1964. He went on to be commander of 30th Engineer Brigade in 1967, Director of Equipment Management (Army) at the Ministry of Defence in 1970 and Deputy Quartermaster-General in 1971. His last appointment was as General Officer Commanding West Midlands District in 1973 before retiring in 1976.

In 1947 he married Elizabeth Mary Jane Davies; they had one son and one daughter.

Military offices
Preceded by James Majury	General Officer Commanding West Midlands District; 1973–1976	Succeeded by Peter Downward
