= Peter Bonnet =

British Army officer (1936–2023)

Major-General Peter Bonnet CB MBE
- Born: 12 December 1936
- Died: 18 February 2023 (aged 86)
- Military career
- Allegiance: United Kingdom
- Branch: British Army
- Rank: Major-General
- Commands: 26 Field Regiment Royal Artillery; Western District
- Awards: Companion of the Order of the Bath; Member of the Order of the British Empire

Major-General Peter Robert Frank Bonnet, CB, MBE (12 December 1936 – 18 February 2023) was a British Army officer.

== Military career ==
Educated at the Royal Military College of Science, Bonnet was commissioned into the Royal Artillery in 1958. He became commanding officer of 26 Field Regiment Royal Artillery in 1978, Commander Royal Artillery for 2nd Division in 1982 and Director Royal Artillery in 1986. His last appointment was as General Officer Commanding Western District in 1989 before retiring in 1991.

In 1961 he married Sylvia Mary Coy; they had two sons. Bonnet died on 18 February 2023, at the age of 86.

Military offices
Preceded by Robert Ward	General Officer Commanding Western District; 1989–1991	Succeeded by Michael Regan (as GOC Wales and Western District)
