= Michael Regan (British Army officer) =

British Army general

Major-General Michael Regan CB OBE
- Born: 6 January 1942 (age 84)
- Military career
- Allegiance: United Kingdom
- Branch: British Army
- Rank: Major-General
- Commands: 3rd Battalion The Light Infantry; 20th Armoured Brigade; Wales and Western District
- Awards: Companion of the Order of the Bath; Officer of the Order of the British Empire

Major-General Michael Dalrymple Regan CB OBE (born 6 January 1942) is a former British Army officer.

== Military career ==
Educated at St Boniface's Catholic College and the Royal Military Academy Sandhurst, Regan was commissioned into the King's Shropshire Light Infantry in 1962. He became commanding officer of 3rd Battalion The Light Infantry in 1982. He went on to be commander 20th Armoured Brigade in 1985, Deputy Chief of Staff at Headquarters UK Land Forces in 1989 and General Officer Commanding Wales and Western District in 1991. His last appointment was as Director-General, Adjutant General's Corps in 1994 before retiring in 1996.

In 1974 he married Victoria Grenfell.

Military offices
Preceded by Peter Davies (as GOC Wales); Peter Bonnet (as GOC Western District)	General Officer Commanding Wales and Western District; 1991–1994	Succeeded by Ian Freer
