= Brendan McGuinness =

British Army general (1931–2024)

Major-General Brendan McGuinness CB
- Born: 26 June 1931
- Died: 19 November 2024 (aged 93); Bristol, England
- Military career
- Allegiance: United Kingdom
- Branch: British Army
- Rank: Major-General
- Commands: 45 Medium Regiment; Western District
- Awards: Companion of the Order of the Bath

Major-General Brendan Peter McGuinness CB (26 June 1931 – 19 November 2024) was a British Army officer.

== Military career ==
Educated at Mount St Mary's College, McGuinness was commissioned into the Royal Artillery in 1950 and saw active service in Borneo in 1966 during the Indonesia–Malaysia confrontation. He became commanding officer of 45 Medium Regiment in 1972. He went on to be commander Royal Artillery for 1st Armoured Division in 1975, Deputy Commander, North East District in 1981 and General Officer Commanding Western District in 1983 before retiring in 1986.

== Personal life and death ==
In 1968 he married Ethne Patricia Kelly; they had one son and one daughter. McGuinness died in Bristol on 19 November 2024, aged 93.

Military offices
Preceded by Richard Keightley	General Officer Commanding Western District; 1983–1986	Succeeded by Robert Ward
