= Richard Keightley =

British Army general (born 1933)

Major-General Richard Keightley CB CStJ
- Born: 2 July 1933 (age 93)
- Military career
- Allegiance: United Kingdom
- Branch: British Army
- Service years: 1953–1987
- Rank: Major-General
- Service number: 430349
- Commands: Western District; RMA Sandhurst
- Conflicts: Suez Crisis
- Awards: Companion of the Order of the Bath

Major-General Richard Charles Keightley CB CStJ (born 2 July 1933) is a former British Army officer who became Commandant of the Royal Military Academy Sandhurst.

== Military career ==
Born the son of General Sir Charles Keightley and educated at Marlborough College and the Royal Military Academy Sandhurst, Richard Keightley was commissioned into the 5th Royal Inniskilling Dragoon Guards in 1953. He took part in the Suez Crisis in 1956. He was appointed Commander Task Force E in 1978, General Officer Commanding Western District in 1982 and Commandant of the Royal Military Academy Sandhurst in 1983 before retiring in 1987.

He was Colonel of the 5th Royal Inniskilling Dragoon Guards from 1986 to 1991.

== Family ==
In 1958 he married Caroline Rosemary Butler; they have three daughters.

Military offices
Preceded by Anthony Ward-Booth	General Officer Commanding Western District; 1982–1983	Succeeded by Brendan McGuinness
Preceded by Geoffrey Howlett	Commandant of the Royal Military Academy Sandhurst; 1983–1987	Succeeded by Simon Cooper
