= Gore Browne =

British Army general

General Gore Browne
- Born: c. 1764
- Died: 12 January 1843
- Military career
- Allegiance: United Kingdom
- Branch: British Army
- Rank: General
- Commands: Western District
- Conflicts: French Revolutionary Wars; Napoleonic Wars

General Gore Browne (c. 1764 – 12 January 1843) was a British Army officer who became Lieutenant-Governor of Plymouth.

== Military career ==
Browne was commissioned as an ensign in the 35th Regiment of Foot on 5 July 1780. He became commanding officer of the 40th Regiment of Foot and commanded it at the Battle of Krabbendam and the Battle of Bergen in September 1799 and the Battle of Alkmaar in October 1799 during the Anglo-Russian invasion of Holland. He commanded a brigade at the Battle of Montevideo in February 1807 during the British invasions of the River Plate and also took part in the unsuccessful Walcheren Campaign in Autumn 1809. He became Lieutenant-Governor of Plymouth and General Officer Commanding Western District in December 1812 and later served as colonel of the 44th Regiment of Foot.

He was buried at St Mary's Church in Weymouth.

Military offices
Preceded by Richard England	GOC Western District; 1812–1819	Succeeded by Sir Denis Pack
