= John Campbell (British Army officer, died 1804) =

Colonel John Campbell
- Died: 1804
- Military career
- Allegiance: United Kingdom
- Branch: British Army
- Rank: Colonel
- Commands: 22nd Regiment of Foot; Western District

Colonel John Campbell (died 1804) was a British Army officer who became Lieutenant-Governor of Plymouth.

== Military career ==
Campbell served as commanding officer of the 22nd Regiment of Foot and saw action at Newport, Rhode Island in May 1778 during the American Revolutionary War. He became Lieutenant-Governor of Plymouth in 1782 with the additional responsibility, from 1793, of the command of Western District. He retired in August 1803 and died in 1804.

Military offices
Preceded by New Post	GOC Western District; 1793–1803	Succeeded by Richard England
