= Peter Gillett =

British Army general

Major-General Sir Peter Gillett KCVO CB OBE
- Born: 8 December 1913
- Died: 4 July 1989 (aged 75); Windsor Castle
- Military career
- Allegiance: United Kingdom
- Branch: British Army
- Rank: Major-General
- Service number: 61527
- Commands: 48th (South Midland) Division/District; West Midlands District
- Conflicts: Second World War
- Awards: Knight Commander of the Royal Victorian Order; Companion of the Order of the Bath; Officer of the Order of the British Empire

Major-General Sir Peter Bernard Gillett, KCVO, CB, OBE (8 December 1913 – 4 July 1989) was a British Army officer.

== Military career ==
Gillett was commissioned into the Royal Artillery on 1 February 1934. After serving in the rank of captain in the Second World War, he became Commander, Royal Artillery for 3rd Infantry Division in December 1959, Chief of Staff at Eastern Command in December 1962 and General Officer Commanding 48th (South Midland) Division/District of the Territorial Army in April 1965. His last appointment was as General Officer Commanding West Midlands District in April 1967 before retiring in April 1968.

In retirement he served as Secretary of the Central Chancery of the Orders of Knighthood from 1968 to 1979 and then as Deputy Constable and Lieutenant-Governor of Windsor Castle from 1978 to 1989.

Military offices
Preceded by John Willoughby	GOC 48th (South Midland) Division/District; 1965–1967	Succeeded by Post disbanded
New title	GOC West Midlands District; 1967–1969	Succeeded by Graham Mills
