= William Nelson Hutchinson =

General William Nelson Hutchinson
- Born: 1803
- Died: 1895 (aged 91–92)
- Military career
- Allegiance: United Kingdom
- Branch: British Army
- Rank: General
- Commands: Western District

General William Nelson Hutchinson (1803–1895) was a British Army officer who became General Officer Commanding Western District.

== Early life ==
Hutchinson was the son of General Sir William Hutchinson, who was Colonel of the 75th Regiment of Foot from October 1841 until his death in 1845.

== Military career ==
Hutchinson was commissioned as an ensign in the 46th Regiment of Foot on 10 March 1820. As a Lieutenant-Colonel, commanding the 20th Regiment of Foot, and Commander of Troops of the Bermuda Garrison, he became acting Governor of Bermuda on 30 November 1846, pending arrival of the replacement of Governor Lieutenant-Colonel Sir William Reid, who departed the same day for Barbados. Hutchinson went on to be General Officer Commanding Western District in October 1859.

He was also Colonel of 33rd (The Duke of Wellington's) Regiment from 1863 until its merger in 1881 with the 76th Regiment of Foot to form the Duke of Wellington's (West Riding Regiment), after which he was colonel of the 1st Battalion of the new regiment until his death in 1895. He was promoted Lieutenant-General in 1865 and full general on 29 May 1873.

In retirement he patented a navigable balloon.

== Family ==
Hutchinson's widow, Mary, died at Sussex-mansion, South Kensington, on 30 June 1902. The couple had two children born in Bermuda Mary Letitia Hutchinson, born in Paget, Bermuda and baptised on 22 December 1842; and Arthur John Hutchinson, born in Paget, Bermuda on 31 August 1846, and baptised on 24 September.

== Works ==
- Hutchinson, William Henry (1882). Dog Breaking: The Most Expeditious, Certain, And Easy Method, Whether Great Excellence Or Only Mediocrity Be Required, With Odds And Ends For Those Who Love The Dog And Gun.

Military offices
Preceded by George Eden	GOC Western District; 1859–1865	Succeeded by Viscount Templetown
Preceded by Sir Charles Yorke	Colonel of the 33rd (The Duke of Wellington's) Regiment of Foot; 1863–1881	Succeeded by Amalgamated to form The Duke of Wellington's (West Riding Regiment)
Preceded by New regiment	Colonel of the 1st Battalion, The Duke of Wellington's (West Riding Regiment); 1881–1895	Succeeded by George Erskine
