= Augustus Spencer =

British Army officer

General The Honourable Sir Augustus Spencer GCB
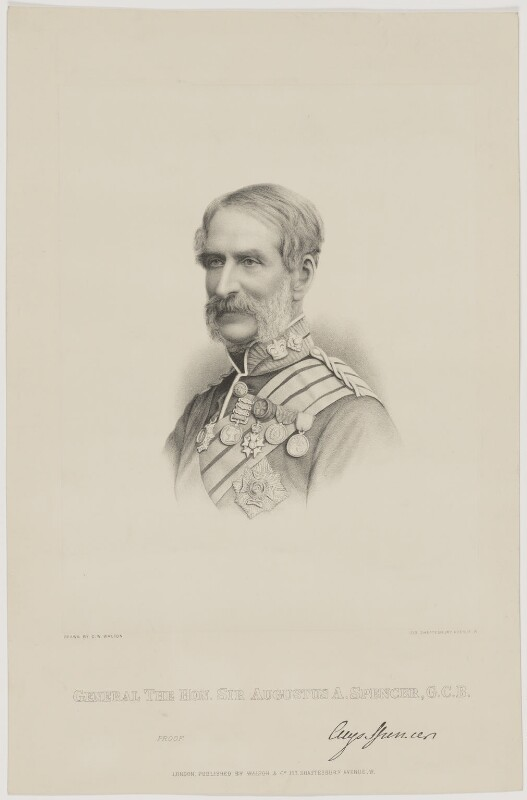
- Born: 25 March 1807; Blenheim Palace, Oxfordshire
- Died: 28 August 1893 (aged 86); London
- Military career
- Allegiance: United Kingdom
- Branch: British Army
- Service years: 1825–1875
- Rank: General
- Commands: Western District; Bombay Army
- Conflicts: Crimean War
- Awards: Knight Grand Cross of the Order of the Bath

General Sir Augustus Almeric Spencer GCB (25 March 1807 – 28 August 1893) was a British Army officer and a member of the Spencer family.

== Military career ==
Born the third son of Francis Spencer, 1st Baron Churchill, Spencer was commissioned an Ensign into the 43rd Light Infantry on 8 April 1825. He was promoted to lieutenant on 5 July 1827, captain on 6 April 1831 and major on 21 July 1843.

Spencer was given command of the 44th Regiment of Foot in 1845 and, having been promoted to lieutenant colonel on 17 May 1854 and to colonel on 20 June 1854, he led that regiment at the Battle of Alma, at the Battle of Inkerman and at the Siege of Sevastopol during the Crimean War. He became commander of a brigade at Aldershot in 1856, and having been promoted to major general on 13 February 1860, he became General Officer Commanding a division of the Madras Army in 1860 and General Officer Commanding Western District in the UK in 1866. Promoted to lieutenant general on 9 May 1868, he went on to be Commander-in-Chief of the Bombay Army in 1869 before retiring in 1875.

Following the death of General Arthur Simcoe Baynes on 13 September 1875, Spencer was promoted to brevet general the following day.

== Family ==
In 1836 he married Helen Maria Campbell, second daughter of General Sir Archibald Campbell, 1st Baronet of New Brunswick. The couple had five daughters and a son:

- Helen Frances Spencer, (b. 1843), married Col. Robert Spencer Liddell, son of Sir John Liddell, KCB, MD
- Caroline Laura Spencer, (b. 1844)
- Elizabeth Maria Spencer, (b. 1845)
- Augusta Melita Spencer, (b. 1848), married firstly, Col. Sussex Vane Stephenson, and secondly, Rev. Edward Mallet Young
- Lt.-Col. Augustus Campbell Spencer, (b. 1851), married Hilda Grant-Thorold, daughter of Alexander William Thorold Grant-Thorold
- Georgina Caroline Spencer (12 February 1854 – 24 April 1864), died in childhood.

One of Spencer's grandsons was the Reverend Canon Henry Spencer Stephenson, Chaplain to King George VI and Queen Elizabeth II.

One of Spencer's great-grandsons, Richard Harry Ramsay Spencer, succeeded as Baron Churchill of Wychwood on 18 October 2017.

== Awards ==
On 16 June 1856 Brigadier-General the Hon. Sir Augustus Almeric Spencer, commander of the 44th Regiment of Foot, was awarded the French Legion of Honour that was reported in the Le Moniteur.

== Death ==
Spencer died on 28 August 1893 and was buried at Brompton Cemetery in London.

Military offices
Preceded by Viscount Templetown	GOC Western District; 1866–1869	Succeeded by Sir Charles Staveley
Preceded by Sir Robert Napier	Commander-in-Chief, Bombay Army; 1869–1874	Succeeded by Sir Charles Staveley
Preceded by Sir Robert Garrett	Colonel of the 43rd (Monmouthshire) Regiment of Foot; 1869–1881	Succeeded by Regiment amalgamated
Preceded by Sir Charles Warren	Colonel of the 96th Regiment of Foot; 1866–1869	Succeeded by George Napier
