= Leicester Smyth =

British Army general

Lieutenant-General The Honourable Sir Leicester Smyth KCB KCMG
- Born: Hon. Leicester Curzon-Howe; 25 October 1829; Norton Juxta Twycross, Leicester, England
- Died: 27 January 1891 (aged 61); London, United Kingdom
- Burial place: Gopsall, Leicestershire
- Spouse: Alicia Maria Eliza Smyth
- Military career
- Allegiance: United Kingdom
- Branch: British Army
- Rank: Lieutenant-General
- Commands: Western District; Cape Colony; Southern District
- Conflicts: Crimean War
- Awards: Knight Commander of the Order of the Bath; Knight Commander of the Order of St Michael and St George

Lieutenant-General Sir Leicester Smyth KCB KCMG (born Curzon-Howe; 25 October 1829 – 27 January 1891) was a British Army officer and colonial administrator who served as the Governor of Gibraltar.

== Early life and education ==
Smyth was the seventh son of Richard Curzon-Howe, 1st Earl Howe and Lady Harriet Georgiana Brudenell, daughter of Robert Brudenell, 6th Earl of Cardigan. He was educated at Eton College.

== Military career ==
Smyth was commissioned into the Rifle Brigade in 1845. He served in the Basuto War in 1852.

In 1854 he was appointed aide-de-camp to Lord Raglan and was present at the Battle of Alma, the Battle of Inkerman and the Siege of Sevastopol. He subsequently served as ADC to General Codrington.

He was made Assistant Military Secretary in the Ionian Islands in 1856, Military Secretary in Ireland in 1865 and Deputy Quartermaster in Ireland in 1872.

In 1877 he became General Officer Commanding Western District and in 1880 GOC Cape Colony. He was acting High Commissioner for Southern Africa from 1882 to 1883, GOC Southern District from 1889 to 1890 (in which capacity he hosted a visit by the Shah of Persia) and Governor of Gibraltar from 1890 until his death in 1891, aged 61. During the Second Boer War, in February 1900, it was claimed that in 1884 Smyth refused a request from Colonel Luard, who was commanding the Royal Engineers, to map the Drakensberg passes. The lack of adequate maps severely hampered British efforts during the war.

== Family ==
On 12 February 1866 in Dublin, he married Alicia Maria Eliza Smyth, daughter and heiress of Robert Smyth of Drumcree, County Westmeath. In November that year, he adopted his wife's maiden name in lieu of his own, and quartered the Smyth arms with the arms of Curzon-Howe. They had no children.

Military offices
Preceded by Henry Smyth	GOC Western District; 1877–1880	Succeeded by Thomas Pakenham
Preceded by Sir George Willis	GOC Southern District; 1889–1890	Succeeded by The Duke of Connaught and Strathearn
Government offices
Preceded by Sir Arthur Hardinge	Governor of Gibraltar; 1890–1891	Succeeded by Sir Lothian Nicholson
