= Robert Ward (British Army officer) =

British Army general (born 1935)

Major-General Robert Ward CB MBE DL
- Born: 17 October 1935 (age 90)
- Military career
- Allegiance: United Kingdom
- Branch: British Army
- Rank: Major-General
- Commands: 1st The Queen's Dragoon Guards; 22nd Armoured Brigade; Western District
- Awards: Companion of the Order of the Bath; Member of the Order of the British Empire

Major-General Robert William Ward CB MBE DL (born 17 October 1935) is a former British Army officer.

== Military career ==
Educated at Rugby School and the Royal Military Academy Sandhurst, Ward was commissioned into the 2nd Dragoon Guards (Queen's Bays) in 1955. He became commanding officer of the 1st The Queen's Dragoon Guards in 1975. He went on to be commander of 22nd Armoured Brigade in 1977, Assistant Chief of Staff, Northern Army Group in 1983 and General Officer Commanding Western District in 1986 before retiring in 1989.

In 1966 he married Lavinia Dorothy Cramsie; they have two sons and one daughter.

Military offices
Preceded by Brendan McGuinness	General Officer Commanding Western District; 1986–1989	Succeeded by Peter Bonnet
