= James Sayer (British Army officer) =

British Army general

Lieutenant-General Sir James Sayer KCB
- Born: James Robert Steadman Sayer; 13 January 1826; Sibton Park, Suffolk, England
- Died: 12 June 1908 (aged 82); Marylebone, London, England
- Military career
- Allegiance: United Kingdom
- Branch: British Army
- Rank: Lieutenant-General
- Commands: Western District
- Conflicts: Crimean War
- Awards: Knight Commander of the Order of the Bath

Lieutenant-General Sir James Robert Steadman Sayer KCB (13 January 1826 – 12 June 1908) was a British Army officer who became General Officer Commanding Western District.

Sayer was born at Sibton Park, the eldest son of Robert Sayer and Frances Errington.

== Military career ==
Sayer was commissioned as a cornet in the King's Dragoon Guards on 23 May 1845. He served as a junior officer in the Crimean War and subsequently served in the British Indian Army. He became General Officer Commanding Western District in England in April 1883.

He was appointed Colonel of the 8th Hussars for a brief time in 1886. He was then Colonel of the 1st King's Dragoon Guards from 1886 to 1908 and, in that capacity, he was advanced to Knight Commander of the Order of the Bath (KCB) in the 1906 Birthday Honours.

Military offices
| Preceded by Thomas Pakenham | GOC Western District; 1883–1885 | Succeeded by Thomas Lyons |
| Preceded by Henry Aitchison Hankey | Colonel of the 1st King's Dragoon Guards; 1886–1908 | Succeeded by William Vesey Brownlow |
| Preceded by William Charles Forrest | Colonel of the 8th Hussars; 1886–1886 | Succeeded by Sir Charles Craufurd Fraser |
