= Richard Harrison (British Army officer) =

General Sir Richard Harrison GCB CMG KStJ DL
- Born: 26 May 1837
- Died: 25 September 1931 (aged 94)
- Military career
- Allegiance: United Kingdom
- Branch: British Army
- Service years: 1855–1903
- Rank: General
- Unit: Royal Engineers
- Commands: Inspector-General of Fortifications (1898–1903); Quartermaster-General to the Forces (1897–1898); Western District (1890–1895)
- Conflicts: Crimean War; Indian Mutiny; Second Opium War; Anglo-Zulu War; First Boer War; 1882 Anglo-Egyptian War
- Awards: Knight Grand Cross of the Order of the Bath; Companion of the Order of St Michael and St George; Knight of Grace of the Venerable Order of Saint John; Order of Osmanieh (Ottoman Empire)

General Sir Richard Harrison GCB CMG KStJ DL (26 May 1837 – 25 September 1931) was a British Army officer and engineer.

== Personal life ==
Born in Essex, he was the second son of Benjamin John Harrison and his wife Emily, daughter of Richard Hall. Harrison was educated at Harrow School. In 1870, he married Amy, the daughter of J. Doyle O'Brien and had by her a son and three daughters. Harrison died at Galmpton, near Brixham in 1931, aged 94.

== Military career ==
=== Early years ===
He was commissioned into the Royal Engineers and became a lieutenant in 1855. Harrison fought at Scutari during the Crimean War in 1856. During the Indian Rebellion of 1857, he took part in the Siege of Lucknow and in the following year, he went into the regions of Rohilkhand and Awadh. Thereafter Harrison was sent to China, taking part in the Second Opium War, where he was present in the Battle of Taku Forts (1860) and its following capture. He was advanced to 2nd captain in 1862 and after two years to major. In 1877, he won a gold medal by the Engineers for an essay he had written.

=== First commandos ===
When in 1879 the Anglo-Zulu War broke out, Harrison was attached to the troops in the Cape Colony and fought in the Battle of Ulundi. Already in the next year the British efforts to bring Southern Africa under its control, led to the First Boer War, during which he had command of a British contingent in Transvaal. Harrison served as assistant adjutant general in the 1882 Anglo-Egyptian War and joined the Battle of Tel el-Kebir, after which he appointed a Companion of the Order of St Michael and St George. Two years later, he accompanied the Nile Expedition, serving as colonel of its staff. Back in England, Harrison became Chief Royal Engineer of the Southeastern District in 1886 and of Aldershot Command in the next year. He was promoted to major general in 1888 and was appointed a governor of the Royal Military Academy, Woolwich in the subsequent year on whose occasion Harrison was made a Knight Commander of the Order of the Bath.

=== Later years ===
In 1890, he obtained the command of the Western District and was promoted to lieutenant general in 1893. Harrison left this post in 1895 and was made a full general. After another two years, he became Quartermaster-General to the Forces and in 1898 was named Inspector-General of Fortifications. In December of the latter year, he was invested a Knight of Grace of the Venerable Order of Saint John. Harrison was nominated Colonel-Commandant of the Royal Engineers on the death of his predecessor in March 1903 and was further honoured with appointment as a Knight Grand Cross of the Order of the Bath in June. He was granted an honorary colonelship of the Devon Royal Garrison Artillery Militia in 1906 and of the Devon Royal Field Reserve Artillery in June 1908. In December he received the same rank of the South Midland Divisional Engineers and additionally of the Devonshire (Fortress) Royal Engineers in 1909. Harrison was selected a deputy lieutenant of the county of Devon in 1921. He was decorated with the Order of Osmanieh.

Military offices
| Preceded by Sir Howard Elphinstone | GOC Western District; 1890–1895 | Succeeded by Sir Frederick Forestier-Walker |
| Preceded by Sir Evelyn Wood | Quartermaster-General to the Forces; 1897–1898 | Succeeded by Sir George White |
| Preceded by Sir Robert Grant | Inspector-General of Fortifications; 1898–1903 | Succeeded by William Terence Shone |
| Preceded by Richard Dyott | Colonel-Commandant of the Royal Engineers; 1903–1931 | Succeeded by Sir Hubert Livingstone |
