= Admiralty House, Mount Wise =

Building in Plymouth, Devon, England

Coordinates: 50.36681°N 4.17022°W

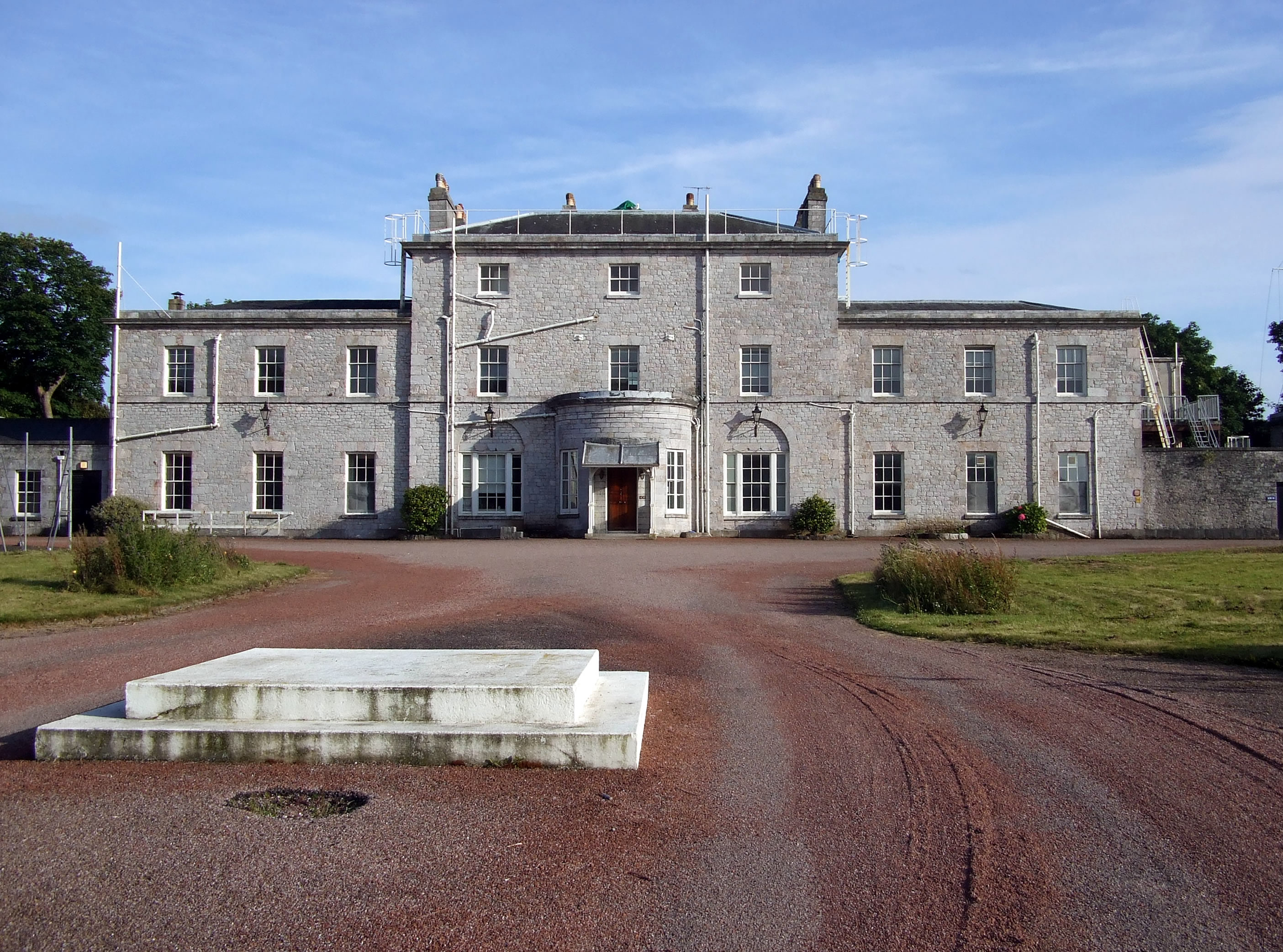
Admiralty House, Mount Wise, viewed in 2008 before re-development. In the foreground is the remnant of the base of the bronze statue of Field Marshal John Colborne, 1st Baron Seaton (1778-1863), now at the Peninsula Barracks and Army Museum in Winchester

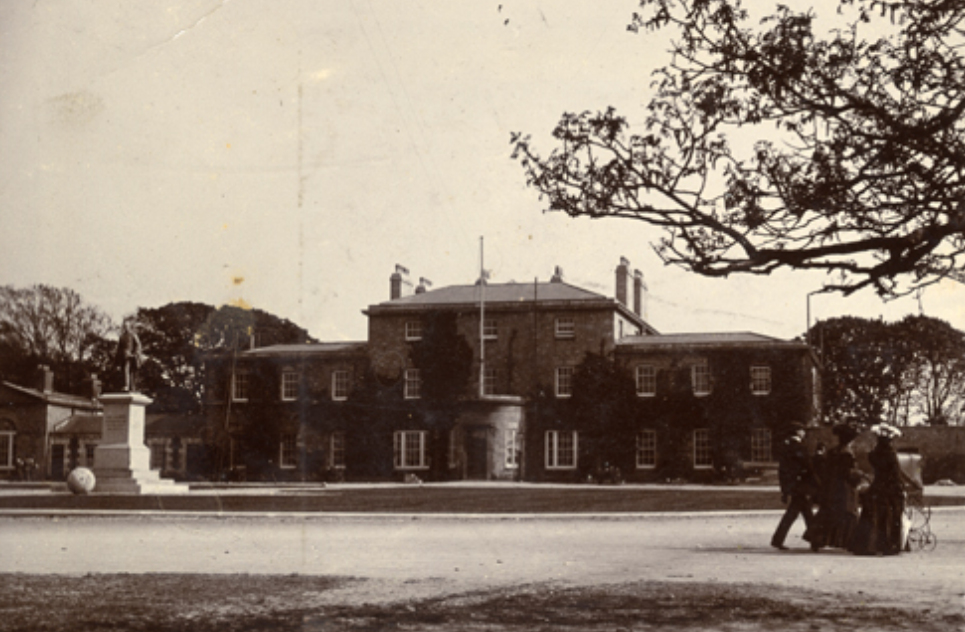
Admiralty House, Mount Wise, photographed late 19th century, with statue of Field Marshal John Colborne, 1st Baron Seaton (1778-1863)

Admiralty House is a substantial building at Mount Wise, Devonport, Plymouth. It is a Grade II listed building.

== History ==
=== Military use in the 18th & 19th centuries ===
The house was designed by James Wyatt and built between 1789 and 1793 in Plymouth limestone. It was originally known as Government House and served as the home of the military Governor of Plymouth; it later housed the General Officer Commanding Western District until that army command moved out in 1905. The house was then used as the home of the General Officer Commanding Wessex Area until 1934.

=== Naval use in the 20th & 21st centuries ===
The naval Commander-in-Chief, Plymouth, who had previously been based next door at Hamoaze House, moved into the property in 1934 and it was renamed Admiralty House. At the same time Hamoaze House, was handed over to the Major-General commanding the Royal Marines.

==== Area Command Headquarters and Plymouth Underground Extension ====
In 1939-41 a partly subterranean complex of buildings was constructed in the grounds of the house, within the ditch of the old fortifications, to serve as a combined RN/RAF headquarters for maritime operations; similar Area Command Headquarters were constructed at the same time close to the Royal Naval Dockyards at Portsmouth, Chatham) and Rosyth. The Prime Minister, Winston Churchill, visited the house and the combined headquarters in 1941. The headquarters were expanded during World War II by a series of tunnels, known as Plymouth Underground Extension (PUE), which formed a sizeable bomb-proof bunker complex under the garden of Admiralty House; it could be accessed from Richmond Walk, Blagdon's boatyard and Hamoaze House as well as from the headquarters building itself. PUE was closed in the 1950s but the headquarters block continued in use.

==== Post-war ====
After the war the combined headquarters (renamed Maritime Headquarters) remained in use as headquarters of the Commander-in-Chief, and as such provided command facilities for NATO operations in the Eastern Atlantic, together with local co-ordination of RN, RAF and Civil Defence capabilities, and assorted intelligence and maritime surveillance facilities. In the mid-1980s and early 1990s the facility was comprehensively upgraded.

After 1969, Admiralty House became the home of the Flag Officer, Plymouth until that post was also disbanded in 1996. The complex was then used to house a number of different operations on a temporary basis until 2004 when it was earmarked for disposal.

=== Closure and sale of the site ===
The house was marketed for sale as a potential hotel in 2014 and much of the surrounding site was adapted for residential use in 2015.
