= Anthony Ward-Booth =

British Army general

Major-General Anthony Ward-Booth OBE DL
- Born: 18 July 1927
- Died: 25 August 2002 (aged 75)
- Military career
- Allegiance: United Kingdom
- Branch: British Army
- Service years: 1946−1982
- Rank: Major-General
- Service number: 369352
- Unit: Worcestershire Regiment
- Commands: 3rd Battalion, Parachute Regiment; 16 Parachute Brigade; Western District
- Awards: Officer of the Order of the British Empire

Major-General John Anthony Ward-Booth OBE DL (18 July 1927 – 25 August 2002) was a British Army officer.

== Military career ==
Educated at Worksop College, Ward-Booth was commissioned into the Worcestershire Regiment in 1946. He became commanding officer of 3rd Battalion the Parachute Regiment in 1967. He went on to be commander of 16 Parachute Brigade in 1970, Deputy Adjutant General, Headquarters, British Army of the Rhine in 1974 and Director, Army Air Corps in 1976. His last appointment was as General Officer Commanding (GOC) Western District in 1979 before retiring in 1982.

In 1952 he married Margaret Joan Hooper: they had two sons and two daughters.

Military offices
Preceded by Peter Downward (as GOC West Midlands District)	General Officer Commanding Western District; 1979–1982	Succeeded by Richard Keightley
