= Henry Smyth (British Army officer, born 1816) =

General Henry Smyth CB
- Born: 5 April 1816; Warmfield cum Heath, Yorkshire
- Died: 1891 (aged 74–75)
- Military career
- Allegiance: United Kingdom
- Branch: British Army
- Rank: General
- Commands: 68th Regiment of Foot; Western District
- Conflicts: Crimean War
- Awards: Knight Commander of the Order of the Bath

General Henry Smyth CB (5 April 1816 – 1891) was a British Army officer who became General Officer Commanding Western District.

== Early life ==
Smyth was the second son of John Henry Smyth, of Heath Hall, Wakefield, Yorkshire, a Whig MP for Cambridge University (1812–1822) and Lady Elizabeth Anne FitzRoy. His elder brother, John George Smyth, was an MP for the City of York.

His maternal grandfather was George FitzRoy, 4th Duke of Grafton and the former Charlotte Maria Waldegrave. His paternal grandparents were Lady Georgiana FitzRoy (daughter of Augustus FitzRoy, 3rd Duke of Grafton) and John Smyth, who served as MP of Pontefract, and was a Lord of the Admiralty, Lord of the Treasury, Master of the Mint, and a Commissioner of the Board of Trade.

== Military career ==
Smyth was commissioned as an ensign in the 68th Regiment of Foot on 28 June 1833. He became commanding officer of the 68th Foot and commanded it at the Battle of Alma in September 1854 and the Battle of Inkerman in November 1854 as well as the Siege of Sevastopol during the Crimean War. He went on to be General Officer Commanding Western District in February 1874.

He became Colonel of the 2nd (The Queen's Royal) Regiment of Foot on 10 April 1877 and was made full General on 29 September 1878.

== Family ==
In 1865, he married Rebecca Mary Pierce, the daughter of Thomas Peirce. Together, they were the parents of:

- William John Smyth (1869–1893), a member of the Indian Civil Service who married Lilian May Clifford, daughter of Capt. Henry Clifford, in 1893.
- George Abraham Smyth (c. 1871-1939), a Colonel who married Isabel Adrienne Colinette MacKenzie, a daughter of Colin MacKenzie.

Smyth died in 1891.

=== Descendants ===
Through his son William he was a grandfather of Sir John Smyth, 1st Baronet, a recipient of the Victoria Cross.

Military offices
Preceded by Sir Charles Staveley	GOC Western District; 1874–1877	Succeeded by Leicester Smyth
Preceded by Clement Edwards	Colonel of the 2nd (The Queen's Royal) Regiment of Foot; 1877–1891	Succeeded by Robert Bruce
