= Thomas Lyons (British Army officer) =

British Army officer

General Thomas Lyons CB
- Born: 9 July 1829; Croom, County Limerick, Ireland
- Died: 13 September 1897 (aged 68)
- Military career
- Allegiance: United Kingdom
- Branch: British Army
- Rank: General
- Commands: Western District
- Conflicts: Indian Rebellion
- Awards: Companion of the Order of the Bath

General Thomas Casey Lyons CB (9 July 1829 – 13 September 1897) was a British Army officer who became General Officer Commanding Western District.

== Early life ==
Born in 1829 in County Limerick, Lyons was the fourth son of Bridgette Kennedy and James Denis Lyons of Croome House, grandson of Thomas Casey, MP for Kilmallock.

== Military career ==
Lyons was commissioned into the 16th Regiment of Foot in 1845. He saw action at the Siege of Lucknow during the Indian Rebellion in 1857. He became Commander of the 1st Infantry Brigade in April 1884 and General Officer Commanding Western District in April 1885 and went on to serve as Governor of Bermuda from 1892 to 1896.

Military offices
Preceded by James Sayer	GOC Western District; 1885–1889	Succeeded by Sir Howard Elphinstone
Political offices
Preceded by Edward Newdegate	Governor of Bermuda; 1892–1896	Succeeded by Sir George Digby Barker
