= Charles Staveley =

British Army general

General Sir Charles Staveley GCB
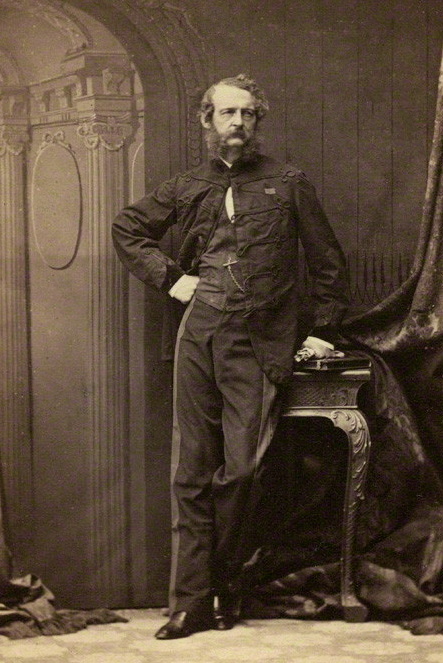
- Born: Charles William Dunbar Staveley; 18 December 1817
- Died: 23 November 1896 (aged 78)
- Military career
- Allegiance: United Kingdom
- Branch: British Army
- Rank: General
- Commands: Commander of British Troops in China and Hong Kong; Western District; Bombay Army
- Conflicts: Crimean War; Second Opium War; Force sent to Abyssinia
- Awards: Knight Grand Cross of the Order of the Bath

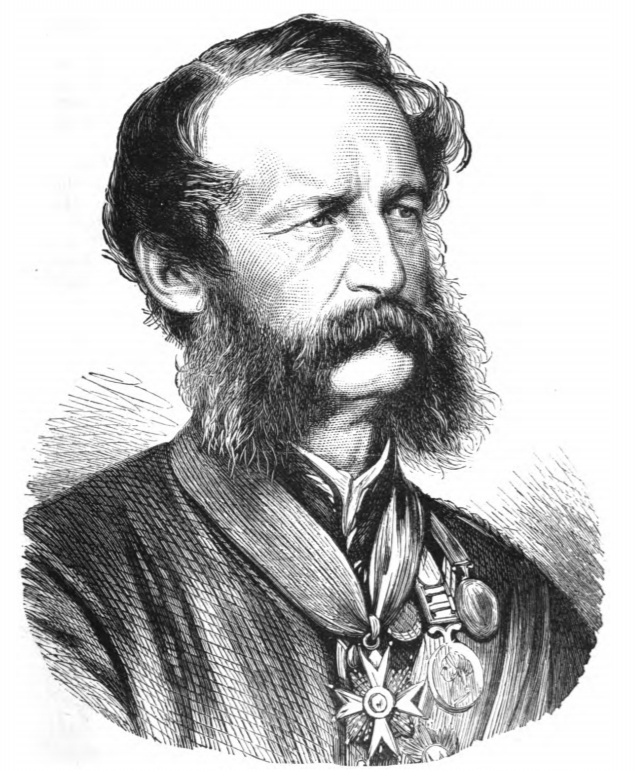

General Sir Charles William Dunbar Staveley GCB (18 December 1817 – 23 November 1896) was a British Army officer.

== Early life ==
He was born at Boulogne-sur-Mer, France, the son of Lt-General William Staveley and Sarah Mather, and educated at the Scottish military and naval academy, Edinburgh.

== Career ==
He was commissioned as second lieutenant in the 87th (Royal Irish Fusiliers) on 6 March 1835. He became a lieutenant on 4 October 1839, and captain on 6 September 1844. From July 1840 to June 1843 he was aide-de-camp to the Governor of Mauritius, where his regiment was stationed, and where his father was acting Governor during part of that time. On his return home, he was quartered at Glasgow, and saved a boy from drowning in the Clyde at imminent risk of his own life, as he was not yet fully recovered from a severe attack of measles.

He exchanged to the 18th Foot on 31 January 1845, and to the 44th on 9 May. From 15 June to 11 May 1847 he was aide-de-camp to the Governor General of British North America. An admirable draughtsman, his sketches proved very useful during the settlement of the Oregon boundary question in 1846. He was assistant military secretary at Hong Kong, where his father was in command, from 20 March 1848 to 27 February 1851.

=== Crimean War ===
He had become a major in the 44th Regiment of Foot on 7 December 1850, and went with them to Turkey in 1854. When the regiment embarked for the Crimea he was to have been left behind on account of illness, but he hid himself on board until the vessel sailed.

He was present at Alma and at Balaclava, where he acted as aide-de-camp to the Duke of Cambridge. On 12 December 1854 he became a lieutenant-colonel in his regiment. The 44th belonged to Sir William Eyre's brigade of the third division, and took part in the attempt on the dockyard creek on 18 June 1855, and in the capture of the cemetery – the sole success achieved. Staveley was mentioned in dispatches (London Gazette, 4 July) and was made CB. He also received the Crimean Medal with three clasps, the Sardinian and Turkish medals, and the Medjidia (fifth class).

=== China ===
He commanded the regiment from 30 June 1855. It returned to England in July 1856, embarked for Madras in August 1857, and went on to China in March 1860. He had become colonel of the 44th on 9 March 1858, and on 28 April 1860 he was made brigadier-general, and was given command of the 1st Brigade of Michel's 1st Division during the Anglo-French expedition to Peking. He was present at the capture of the Taku forts, was mentioned in dispatches (ib. 4 Nov. 1860), and received the medal with clasp. On 18 January 1861, he was given one of the rewards for distinguished service.

He was left as Commander of British Troops in China and Hong Kong in 1862. The Taiping Rebellion was then in full career. The rebels had broken their promise not to come within thirty miles of Shanghai and were threatening that city itself. In April Staveley marched against them with a force of about two thousand men, of which about one-third consisted of French and English seamen and marines. He shelled them out of the entrenched camp at Wongkadze and stormed Tsipu, Kahding, Tsinpu, Nanjao and Cholin in the course of April and May. But the Chinese imperial troops were unable to hold all the towns recovered, and he had to withdraw the British garrison from Kahding (ib. 18 July and 5 Aug. 1862). In the autumn Kahding and Tsinpu were again taken, and the thirty-mile radius cleared of the rebels.

In December he was asked by Li Hung Chang to name a British officer to replace the American Burgevine as commander of the disciplined Chinese force which had been formed by Frederick Townsend Ward. Staveley named Charles George Gordon, who had been chief engineer under him in the recent operations, and had surveyed all the country around Shanghai. They had served together before Sebastopol, and Staveley's sister was the wife of Gordon's brother. The appointment had to be approved from England, and was not taken up until the end of March 1863. At that time ill-health obliged Staveley to resign his command and go home.

=== Abyssinia ===
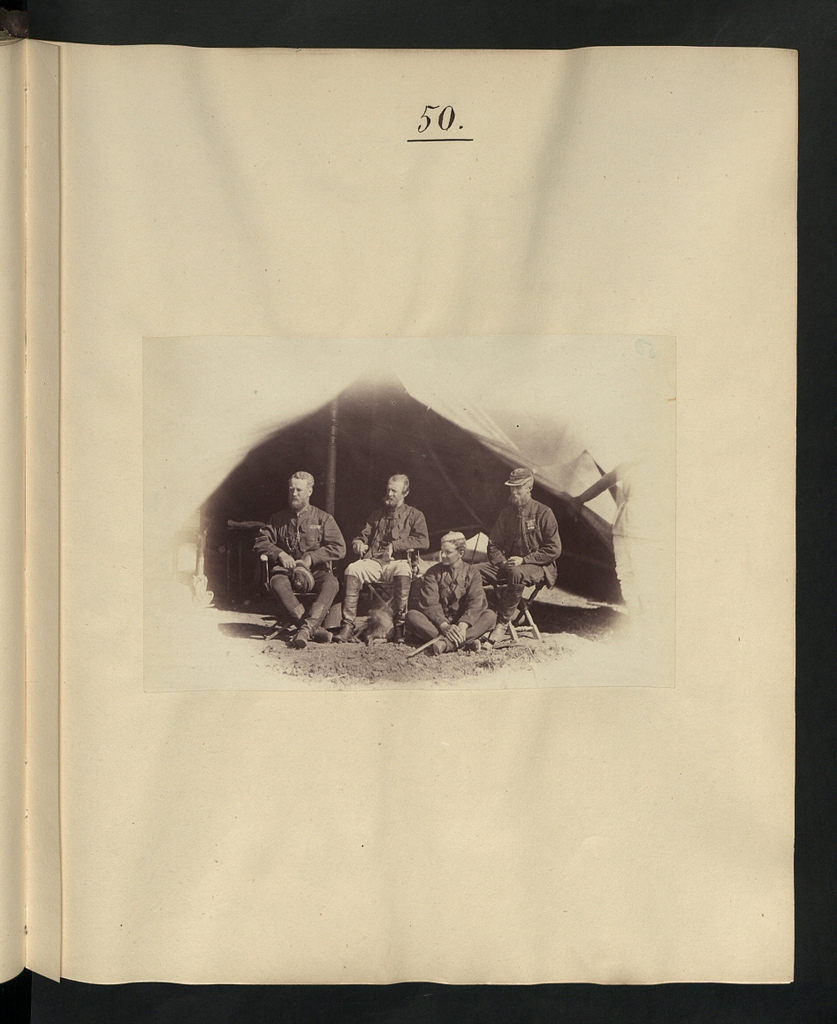
Sir C. Staveley and staff during the British Expedition to Abyssinia

In March 1865 he was made KCB and was appointed to the command of the first division of the Bombay Army. On 25 September 1867, he was promoted major-general, and in November, by Sir Robert Napier's desire, he was given command of the first division of the force sent to Abyssinia. He showed his energy to good purpose in the organisation of the base at Annesley Bay, and he conducted the fight on the Arogye plain, which immediately preceded the capture of Magdala. Napier said in his dispatch that Staveley had afforded him most valuable support and assistance throughout the campaign. He received the thanks of Parliament and the medal.

== Later life ==
Staveley commanded the troops in the Western District for five years from 1 January 1869, and in the autumn manoeuvres of 1871 round Aldershot, one of the three divisions was under him. He was Commander-in-Chief of the Bombay Army from 7 October 1874 to 7 October 1878, with the local rank of lieutenant-general, which became his substantive rank on 29 April 1875. On 1 October 1877 he became general. He was given the colonelcy of the 36th foot on 2 February 1876, and transferred to his old regiment, the 44th (which had become the first battalion of the Essex Regiment), on 25 July 1883. He received the GCB on 24 May 1884. He had been placed on the retired list on 8 October in the previous year.

He died at Aban Court, Cheltenham, on 23 November 1896, and was buried at Brompton Cemetery, London on 27 November.

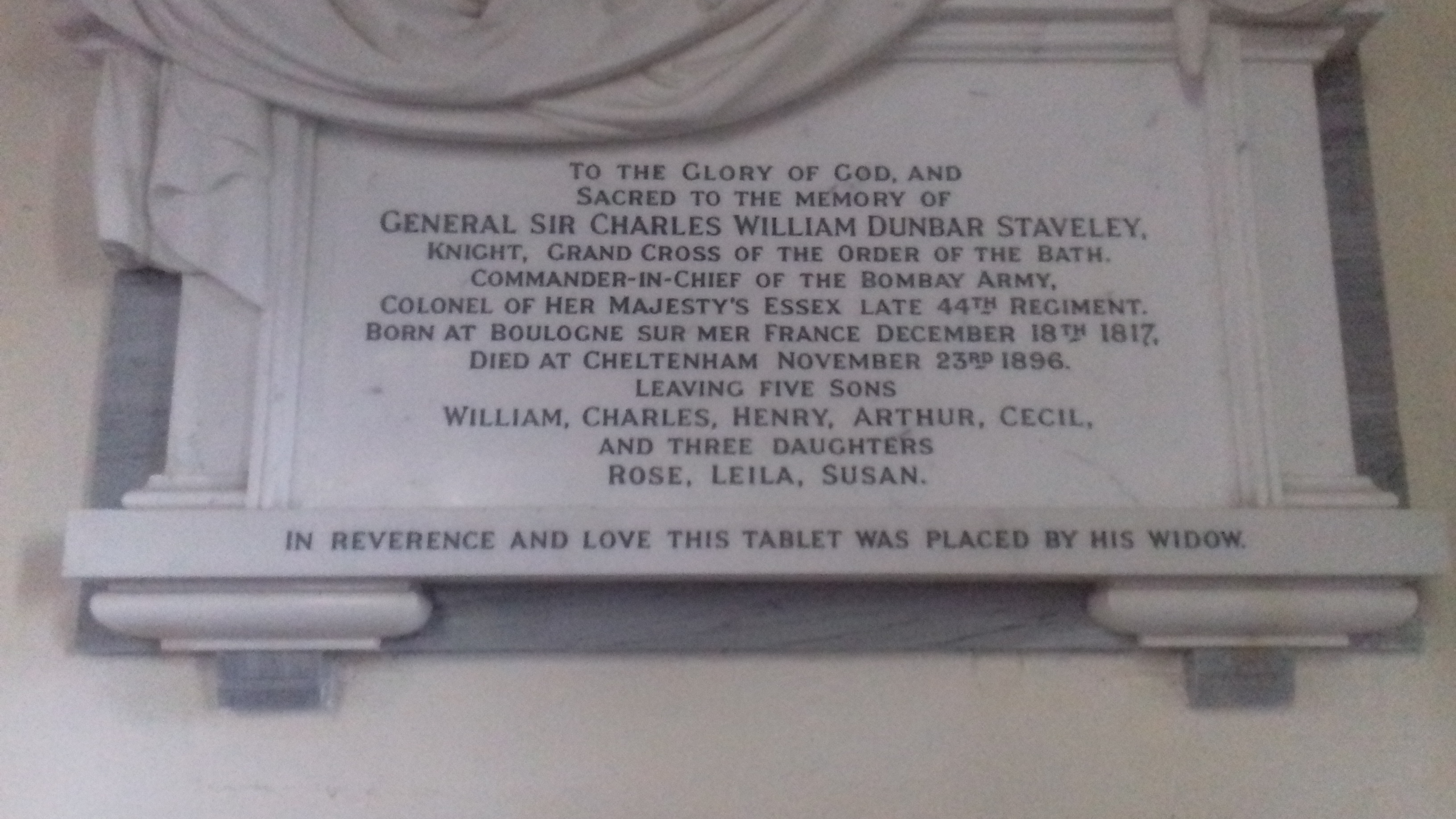
Memorial plaque at Capel Le Fern, Kent.

== Family ==
In 1864, Charles married Susan Millicent, daughter of Charles William Minet of Baldwyns, Kent. They had five sons: William, Charles, Henry, Arthur and Cecil, who later became a vice admiral. Cecil's son Sir William Staveley became an Admiral of the Fleet. They also had three daughters: Rose, Leila and Susan.

Military offices
Preceded by Sir John Michel	Commander of British Troops in China and Hong Kong; 1862–1863	Succeeded by William Brown
Preceded by Sir Augustus Spencer	GOC Western District; 1869–1874	Succeeded by Henry Smyth
Preceded by Sir Augustus Spencer	C-in-C, Bombay Army; 1874–1878	Succeeded by Sir Henry Warre
