= John Mogg (British Army officer) =

British Army general (1913–2001)

General Sir John Mogg GCB CBE DSO*
- Born: Herbert John Mogg; 13 February 1913; Vancouver Island, British Columbia, Canada
- Died: 28 October 2001 (aged 88); Watlington, Oxfordshire, England
- Spouse: Cecilia Margaret Molesworth (m. 1939)
- Military career
- Allegiance: United Kingdom
- Branch: British Army
- Service years: 1932–1976
- Rank: General
- Service number: 73153
- Units: Oxfordshire and Buckinghamshire Light Infantry; Royal Green Jackets
- Commands: Army Strategic Command; I Corps; Royal Military Academy Sandhurst; 10th Battalion, Parachute Regiment; 9th Battalion, Durham Light Infantry
- Conflicts: Second World War; Malayan Emergency
- Awards: Knight Grand Cross of the Order of the Bath; Commander of the Order of the British Empire; Companion of the Distinguished Service Order & Bar

General Sir Herbert John Mogg, GCB, CBE, DSO & Bar (17 February 1913 – 28 October 2001) was a senior British Army officer who also held the NATO position of Deputy Supreme Allied Commander Europe (DSACEUR) and was "in his time, probably the British army's most popular general".

== Military career ==
Mogg was educated at St Michael's School in Victoria, British Columbia, Malvern College, and the Royal Military College, Sandhurst. After Malvern he took a Y-cadetship with the 3rd Battalion, Coldstream Guards. After three years in the ranks he was selected for Sandhurst, where he gained the Sword of Honour in 1936, being commissioned into the 1st Battalion, Oxfordshire and Buckinghamshire Light Infantry, (43rd & 52nd) in August 1937.

== Second World War ==
In 1939, Mogg was posted to the 5th Battalion, Oxfordshire & Buckinghamshire Light Infantry, a newly formed Territorial training unit, and served initially as adjutant and later second-in-command. By 1943, Major Mogg was in command of a Divisional Battle School at Margate, 61st Infantry Division, XI Corps, Home Forces. Mogg approached Major General Adrian Carton de Wiart, and later Major General Brian Wainwright, General Officers Commanding the 61st Infantry Division seeking an operational command. In the weeks before D-Day he was appointed second-in-command, 9th Battalion Durham Light Infantry (DLI), 151st Brigade.

On D-Day, 6 June 1944, the 9th DLI landed on Gold Beach at Le Hamel, Asnelles. In the breakout from the Normandy beachhead, the 9th DLI supported by the 4th/7th Dragoon Guards were ordered to attack the village of Lingèvres on 14 June 1944, defended by the Panzer Lehr Division. Mogg gave an account of his experiences of the battle, during which the commanding officer, Lieutenant Colonel Humphrey Woods was killed and Mogg assumed command.

As we crossed the start line all hell let loose from our own side and what with Typhoons and the artillery barrage and the tanks all shooting up the enemy positions in the wood, you could have seen the ground literally dance in front of you. And trees were coming down and I thought to myself "Good Lord, nobody can ever live in that thing, we must be able to walk straight on to our objective".

And so we crossed right on time, 10.15, across the start line, with Humphrey Woods on the left and me on the right and we went through the corn, and the Geordies were never very tall guys and the corn that year was extremely high. We advanced about halfway across the corn with still this barrage going on when you suddenly saw the odd Geordie dropping in the corn and you couldn't quite make this out where it was coming from. But, in fact, it was machine-gun fire coming from the forward edge of the wood and quite a lot of Geordies were dropping in the corn as casualties all the way along.

However we advanced...and I spoke to Humphrey Woods on my radio, and this is the last time I heard him, and he said "We are running into terrible trouble here on the left, all the 'A' Company officers are casualties. I am trying to get on with 'B' Company and I will try and see how it happens. If not, if we don't make any ground, you go on, whatever you do go on to your side of the village and I will try and collect as many of our soldiers and then come round behind you, because it's obviously going to be easier your side". And, in fact, he was right, it was easier our side and apart from a fair amount of hand to hand fighting of 'C' Company on the right we got into the woods.

...There was a scene of utter destruction with the church in ruins and many of the buildings had collapsed and there was very heavy shelling from the far side of the village. I suddenly had a message to say that Humphrey Woods had been killed and I suddenly realized that meant that I was the senior officer in the place and that made me the Commanding Officer, which filled me with utter despair to start with but I realized I must do something about it."

I remember my Gunner officer was up by the Church in his tank at the main crossroads and we made a plan for some Artillery Fires which I could call for quickly." "We had an 'O' group with the two Company Commanders, the Anti Tank Platoon Commander, Carrier Platoon Commander, the Gunner and the 4th/7th Sqn Leader. I allocated positions for the Coys. blocking both roads and then I sited the Anti tank guns.

Lingevres was taken and held against repeated German counterattacks until 9DLI and 4th/7th Dragoon Guards were relieved. The battalion suffered casualties of 226 men and 22 officers. Mogg was appointed a Companion of the Distinguished Service Order (DSO) for his actions at Lingevres, presented in the field by Field Marshal Sir Bernard Montgomery.

The 9th DLI saw further action at the Falaise Pocket, the crossing of the Albert Canal and at Gheel, Belgium. On 23 September, the 151st Brigade was ordered to move north and east of Eindhoven with the 231st Brigade to guard the right flank of Operation Market Garden. In November 1944, the 151st Brigade was disbanded and some units returned to Britain. However the 9th DLI was reinforced and transferred to the 7th Armoured Division, 131st Infantry Brigade, as a motorised battalion fighting at the Roer Triangle in January 1945 and the town of Ibbenbüren in March. The 9th DLI ended the war near Hamburg.

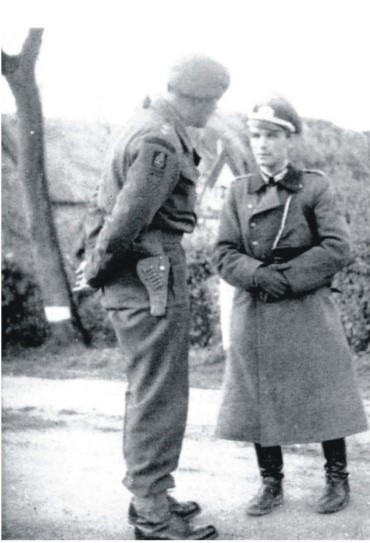
Mogg with ADC to General Wolz, Commander of Hamburg Garrison who was escorted to deliver the surrender of German Forces in North West Germany, 3rd May 1945.

== Post war ==
In 1945 Mogg attended the Staff College, Camberley, as a student. After two years in Germany as GSO1, 7th Armoured Division, he returned to the Staff College as a member of the Directing Staff. From 1950 to 1952 he was commanding officer of the 10th Battalion, Parachute Regiment. In 1952 he became Chief Instructor at the School of Infantry at Warminster and from 1954 to 1956 was GSO1 at the Imperial Defence College. From 1958 he commanded the 28th Commonwealth Infantry Brigade Group in the final stages of the Malayan Emergency, where he received the Meritorious Medal from the Sultan of Perak. On return to the United Kingdom, he was appointed Director of Combat Development at the War Office and promoted to major general.

Mogg was appointed General Officer Commanding Southern Command in 1968, General Officer Commanding, Army Strategic Command later that year and, finally, Adjutant-General to the Forces in 1970. He delivered the Kermit Roosevelt Lecture in April 1969 at Fort Leavenworth; an exchange programme with the US Army supported by the Kermit Roosevelt Fund. His lecture was suitably entitled; "Communication as a military art." He travelled extensively as Adjutant General, visiting British units overseas and reassuring Britain's allies in the Middle East and elsewhere at the time of Britain's withdrawal from 'East of Suez'; earning the sobriquet "Marco Polo" amongst his colleagues at the MOD.

Mogg's final appointment was with NATO at Supreme Headquarters Allied Powers Europe (SHAPE), Mons as Deputy Supreme Allied Commander Europe, DSACEUR between 1973 and 1976. He was ADC General to the Queen from 1971 to 1974, Colonel Commandant of the Royal Green Jackets from 1965 to 1973, Commandant of the Army Air Corps from 1963 to 1974. and Honorary Colonel of the 10th Battalion, Parachute Regiment (1973–78).

Mogg promoted many sports and adventure training within the army and was a president of a number army and veteran's associations. He served various charities mostly connected with the armed services or adventure training. He was respectively Chairman of Operation Drake Fellowship (now part of Fairbridge (charity), Operation Raleigh, President of the Army Cricket Association, Army Free Fall Parachute Association, Army Saddle Club, the British Horse Society, the Ex-Services Mental Welfare Society, The Normandy Veterans' Association and Chairman of The Army Benevolent Fund.

His interest in education was shown in his Chairmanship of the governors of the Royal Soldiers' Daughters School and Icknield School, Watlington. He was also a long serving governor of Bradfield College and his old school Malvern. In Detmold, Germany, a primary school for children whose parents are serving in the British Army was named after Sir John Mogg.

Mogg was made Vice Lord Lieutenant of Oxfordshire in 1979.

== Family and personal life ==
Mogg was born near Comox, Vancouver Island, British Columbia, the son of Captain Herbert Barrow Mogg and Alice Mary Mogg, daughter of Lieutenant Colonel John Fane Ballard, late DCLI, and Mary née Clerke Brown of Kingston Blount, Oxon. In 1939, he married Cecilia Margaret Molesworth, daughter of Rev. John Hilton and Mrs E. Molesworth and a direct descendant of Robert Molesworth, 1st Viscount Molesworth. Sir John and Lady Mogg had three sons.

Military offices
Preceded by George Gordon-Lennox	Commandant of the Royal Military Academy Sandhurst; 1963–1966	Succeeded by Peter Hunt
Preceded by Sir Richard Goodwin	GOC 1st (British) Corps; 1966–1968	Succeeded by Sir Mervyn Butler
Preceded by Sir Geoffrey Baker	GOC-in-C Southern Command; 1968	Succeeded by Sir David Yates
New title	General Officer Commanding, Army Strategic Command; 1968–1970	Succeeded by Sir Mervyn Butler
Preceded by Sir Geoffrey Musson	Adjutant General; 1970–1973	Succeeded by Sir Cecil Blacker
Preceded by Sir Desmond Fitzpatrick	Deputy Supreme Allied Commander Europe; 1973–1976	Succeeded by Sir Harry Tuzo
