= Richard Keith-Jones =

British Army general

Major-General Richard Keith-Jones CB MBE MC
- Born: 6 December 1913; Dehra Dun, British India
- Died: 26 May 1992 (aged 78)
- Military career
- Allegiance: United Kingdom
- Branch: British Army
- Rank: Major-General
- Service number: 62519
- Unit: Royal Artillery
- Commands: 4th Regiment, Royal Horse Artillery; 50th (Northumbrian) Division/District
- Conflicts: Second World War
- Awards: Companion of the Order of the Bath; Member of the Order of the British Empire; Military Cross

Major-General Richard Keith-Jones, CB, MBE, MC (1913–1992) was a British Army officer.

== Military career ==
Keith-Jones was educated at Clifton College. He was commissioned into the Royal Artillery on 1 February 1934. He saw action in the Italian campaign during the Second World War, for which he was awarded the Military Cross.

After the war he became a GSO2 instructor at the Staff College, Camberley, from September 1949 until December 1951, Commander, Royal Artillery (CRA) for 17th Gurkha Division in July 1957 and General Officer Commanding 50th (Northumbrian) Division/District of the Territorial Army in March 1964 before retiring in July 1966.

Keith-Jones wrote the foreword to A Short History of the 50th Northumbrian Division by Major A.H.R. Baker and Major B. Rust TD, published in 1966, as General Officer Commanding 50th Northumbrian Division, from Kirkleavington Hall, Yarm, Yorkshire.

During the 1950s, Keith-Jones was a military assistant to Field Marshal Montgomery as part of Montgomery's NATO Deputy Supreme Allied Commander Europe staff. Keith-Jones became the second commandant of the Joint Warfare Establishment in 1966.

He was appointed a Member of the Order of the British Empire in the 1947 Birthday Honours and a Companion of the Order of the Bath in the 1968 New Year Honours.

Military offices
Preceded by Antony Read	GOC 50th (Northumbrian) Division/District; 1964–1966	Succeeded by Derek Horsford
