= Richard Anderson (British Army officer) =

British Army general (1907–1979)

Lieutenant-General Sir Richard Anderson KCB CBE DSO
- Lieutenant-General Anderson in 1958
- Born: 28 April 1907; Chelsea, London, England
- Died: 4 September 1979 (aged 72)
- Military career
- Allegiance: United Kingdom
- Branch: British Army
- Service years: 1927–1965
- Rank: Lieutenant-General
- Service number: 38648
- Unit: King's Own Royal Regiment (Lancaster)
- Commands: 1st Battalion, King's Own Royal Regiment; 2nd Infantry Brigade; 17th Gurkha Division; British Forces in Malaya; Middle East Land Forces; Northern Ireland Command
- Conflicts: Arab revolt in Palestine; Second World War
- Awards: Knight Commander of the Order of the Bath; Commander of the Order of the British Empire; Companion of the Distinguished Service Order; Mentioned in dispatches
- Other work: Director, Civil Defence for Wales, 1965–1968

Lieutenant-General Sir Richard Neville Anderson KCB CBE DSO (28 April 1907 – 4 September 1979) was a senior officer of the British Army who served in the Second World War and later achieved high office in the 1960s.

== Military career ==
Born in Chelsea, London, on 28 April 1907, the son of Colonel Sir Neville Anderson, Anderson was educated at the New Beacon School and Tonbridge School and the Royal Military College, Sandhurst. After passing out from Sandhurst, he was commissioned as a second lieutenant into the King's Own Royal Regiment (Lancaster) on 1 September 1927. Anderson served with the 2nd Battalion, King's Own throughout most of the interwar period and was promoted to lieutenant on 1 September 1930, and captain on 28 December 1936. From 30 March 1937 he served as his battalion's adjutant, which was deployed to Palestine the following year, where it was stationed during the Arab revolt in Palestine, and commanded for most of this time by Lieutenant Colonel Neil Ritchie, who was succeeded in August 1939 by John Hardy. For his services in Palestine Anderson was mentioned in dispatches on 15 September 1939.

He served in the Second World War, initially still as battalion adjutant until returning to England in April 1940, where he became Deputy Assistant Military Secretary at the War Office. From May to September 1940 he served as brigade major with the 199th Infantry Brigade, part of the 55th (West Lancashire) Infantry Division.

In 1944 he was made Commanding officer (CO) of the 1st Battalion, King's Own Royal Regiment (Lancaster), commanding it in the Italian Campaign where he was appointed a Companion of the Distinguished Service Order for leading an attack on the village of Montone, which was successfully taken with only 28 casualties (including 5 KIA) compared to 105 Germans (20 KIA, the rest taken prisoner). Later, he was promoted to brigadier and became commander of 2nd Infantry Brigade, part of the British 1st Infantry Division, in the Italian Campaign.

After the Second World War he returned to Palestine and then became General officer commanding (GOC) 17th Gurkha Division in 1955. He was General Officer Commanding Overseas Forces in Malaya in 1957 and then Vice Adjutant General at the War Office from 1958. He was appointed General Officer Commanding-in-Chief Middle East Land Forces in 1960 and General Officer Commanding-in-Chief Northern Ireland Command in 1963; he retired in 1965.

From 1959 to 1966 he was Regimental Colonel of the 10th Princess Mary's Own Gurkha Rifles.

He lived at Tarrant Keynston House near Blandford in Dorset. In 1942 he married Dorrie Norah Wybergh and with her had two sons.

== Honours and awards ==
- Knight Commander of the Order of the Bath 10 June 1961 (CB 1 January 1957)
- Commander of the Order of the British Empire 7 January 1949
- Companion of the Distinguished Service Order 7 December 1944, 28 June 1945
- Mentioned in Despatches 15 September 1939
- Honorary Fellow, Institute of Civil Defence, 1966

Military offices
Preceded by Lancelot Perowne	GOC 17th Gurkha Division; 1955−1958	Succeeded by Jim Robertson
Honorary titles
Preceded by John Hardy	Colonel of the King's Own Royal Regiment (Lancaster); 1957−1959	Succeeded by Regiment consolidated to form the King's Own Royal Border Regiment
Preceded by Michael Roberts	Colonel of the 10th Princess Mary's Own Gurkha Rifles; 1959−1966	Succeeded by Sir Peter Hunt
Military offices
Preceded by Sir Roger Bower	C-in-C Middle East Land Forces; 1960−1963	Succeeded by Sir Charles Harington
Honorary titles
Preceded by Valentine Blomfield	Colonel of the King's Own Royal Border Regiment; 1961−1971	Succeeded by Sir William Scotter
Military offices
Preceded by John Hackett	GOC British Army in Northern Ireland; 1963−1965	Succeeded by Desmond Fitzpatrick
