= Godfrey Ferdinando Stratford Collins =

British civil servant (1888–1952)

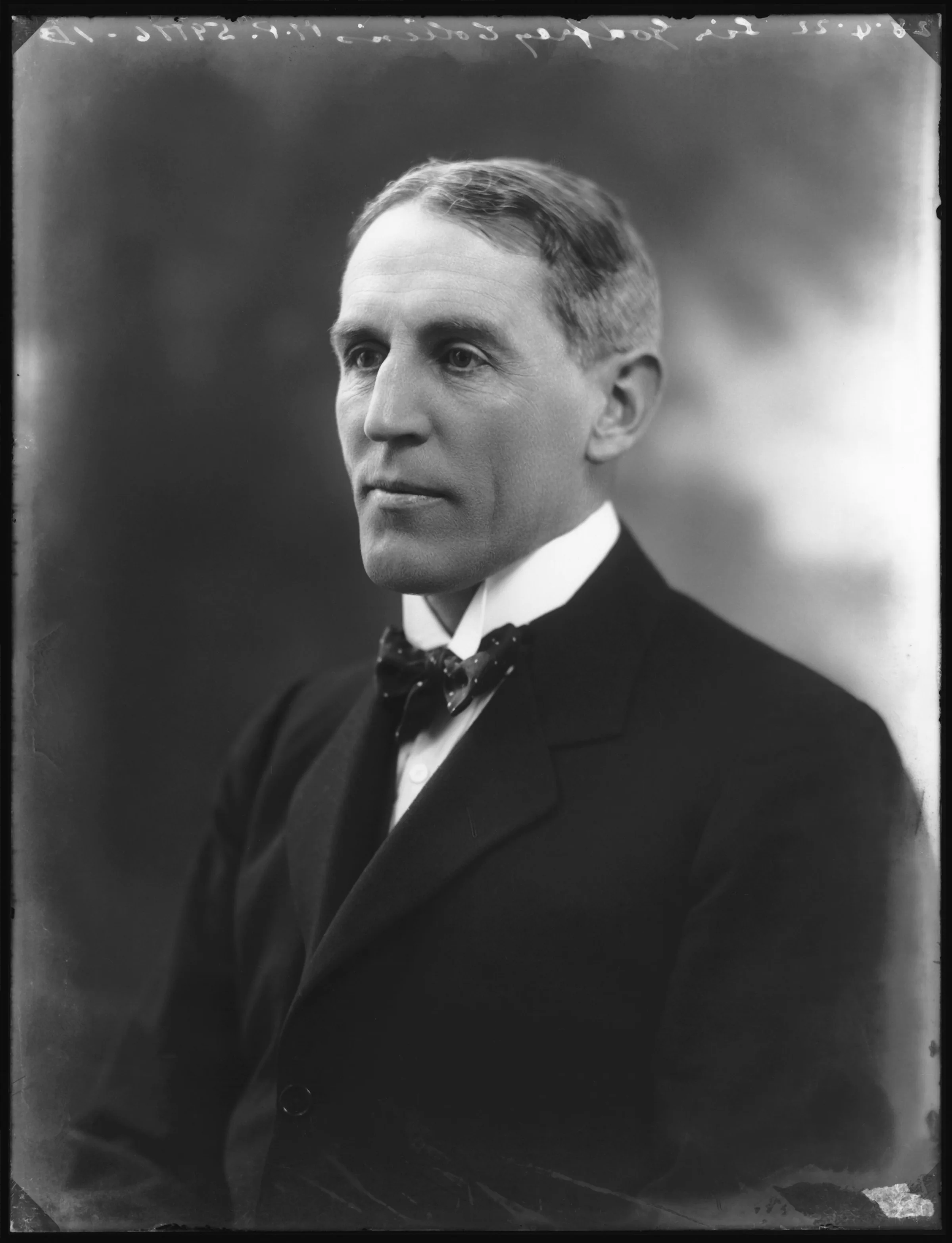
Collins in 1922

Sir Godfrey Ferdinando Stratford Collins, KCIE CSI OBE (3 November 1888 – 3 August 1952) was a member of the Indian Civil Service.

== Biography ==
The second son of F. S. Collins, Lincoln Hill, Ross, Herefordshire, Collins was educated at Charterhouse School and Christ Church, Oxford.

He entered the Indian Civil Service in 1912, and was Assistant Collector and Magistrate from 1912 to 1916, in the Indian Army Reserve of Officers from 1916 to 1918, Forest Settlement Officer from 1920 to 1922, Collector and District Magistrate from 1923, Registrar of Co-operative Societies from 1926 to 1927, Home Secretary to the Government of Bombay from 1929 to 1931, Private Secretary to the Governor of Bombay from 1934 to 1935, Officiating Commissioner in Sind in 1935, Commissioner Northern Division, Bombay from 1936 to 1937, Revenue Commissioner for Sind from 1937 to 1940, Chief Secretary to the Government of Bombay from 1940 to 1941, Adviser to the Governor of Bombay from 1941 to 1946, and Commissioner Jewish Camps in Cyprus from 1947 to 1949.

In 1957, his daughter Rosemary married Sir David Hardy, son of Brigadier John Hardy MC, and they had a son and a daughter together.
