= Geoffrey Baker (British Army officer) =

British Army officer (1912–1980)

Field Marshal Sir Geoffrey Baker GCB CMG CBE MC
- General Sir Geoffrey Baker in 1968
- Born: 20 June 1912; Murree, British India
- Died: 8 May 1980 (aged 67); Wellington College, Berkshire, England
- Military career
- Allegiance: United Kingdom
- Branch: British Army
- Service years: 1932–1971
- Rank: Field Marshal
- Service number: 50806
- Unit: Royal Artillery
- Commands: Chief of the General Staff; Southern Command; 3rd Regiment Royal Horse Artillery; 127th Field Regiment, Royal Artillery
- Conflicts: Second World War; Cyprus Emergency; The Troubles
- Awards: Knight Grand Cross of the Order of the Bath; Companion of the Order of St Michael and St George; Commander of the Order of the British Empire; Military Cross; Mentioned in Despatches (3); Legion of Merit (United States)
- Other work: Constable of the Tower of London (1975–80)

Field Marshal Sir Geoffrey Harding Baker, GCB, CMG, CBE, MC (20 June 1912 – 8 May 1980) was Chief of the General Staff, the professional head of the British Army, from 1968 to 1971. He served in the Second World War and became director of operations and chief of staff for the campaign against EOKA in Cyprus during the Cyprus Emergency and later in his career provided advice to the British Government on the deployment of troops to Northern Ireland at the start of the Troubles.

== Military career ==
Born the son of Colonel Cecil Norris Baker and Ella Mary Baker (née Hutchinson) and educated at Wellington College and the Royal Military Academy, Woolwich, Baker was commissioned into the Royal Artillery on 28 January 1932. He was promoted to lieutenant on 28 January 1935 and was posted later that year to Meerut in India.

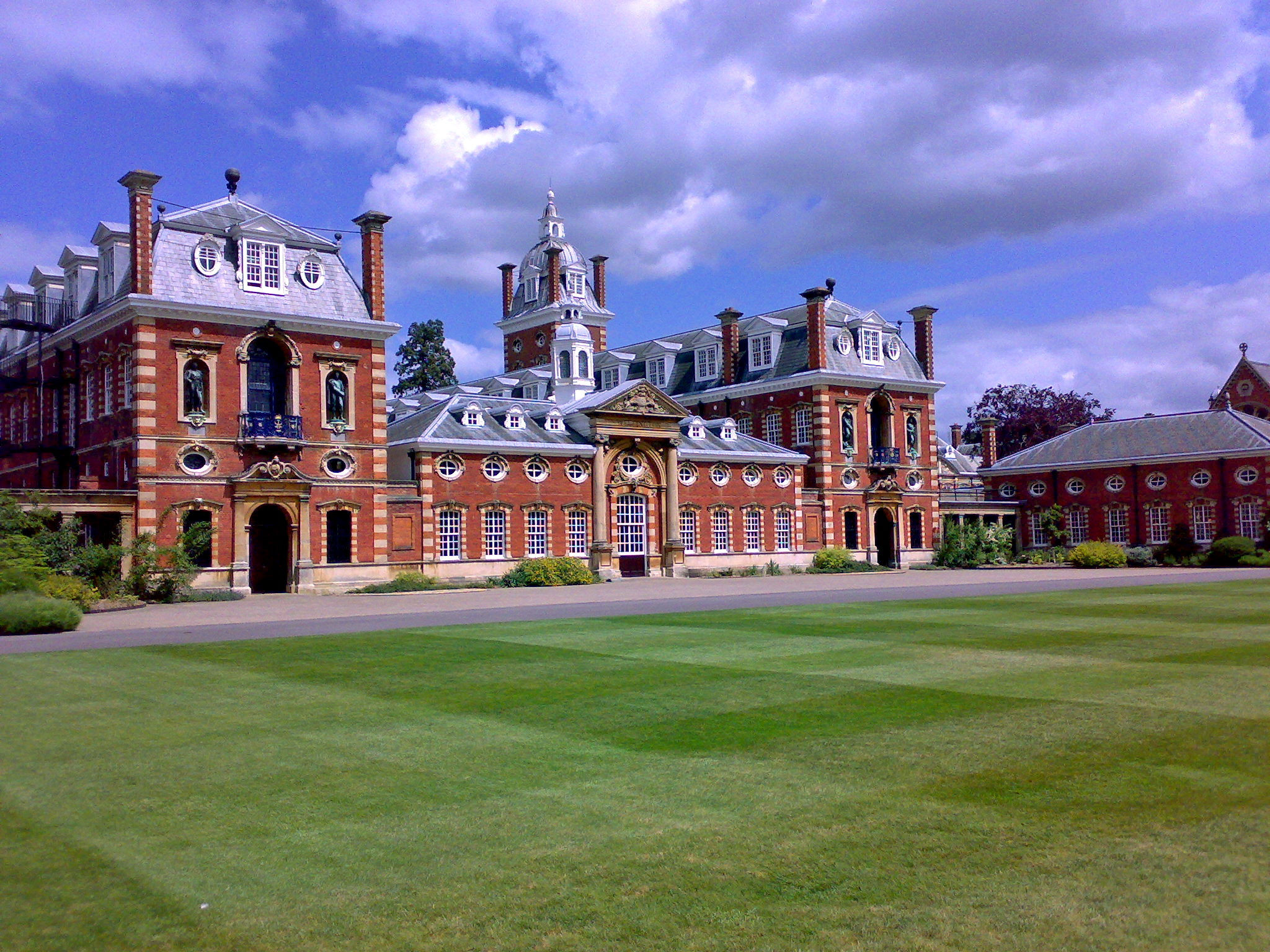
Wellington College where Baker was educated

Baker served in the Second World War and, having been promoted to captain on 28 January 1940, and posted as a staff officer to Headquarters Middle East in May 1940. He took part in the campaign in East Africa, during which he fought at the Battle of Keren for which he was awarded the Military Cross on 8 July 1941, was wounded three times, and was mentioned in despatches on 30 December 1941 and on 15 December 1942. He was appointed commanding officer of 127 Field Regiment RA in July 1943 and, having been appointed an Officer of the Order of the British Empire for his services in the Middle East on 14 October 1943, he led his regiment during the Allied invasion of Sicily. In March 1944 he joined to staff at 21st Army Group and took part in the Normandy landings and the campaign in North West Europe, being mentioned in despatches on 10 May 1945, appointed a Commander of the Order of the British Empire on 24 January 1946, and awarded the Legion of Merit in the Degree of Commander by the president of the United States on 17 September 1948.

After the war, Baker co-ordinated administrative services in the Allied Control Commission in Germany. Promoted to the substantive rank of major on 1 July 1946, he was appointed deputy director of Staff Duties at the War Office in January 1947. After promotion to lieutenant colonel on 31 December 1951, he took command of 3rd Regiment Royal Horse Artillery at Munsterlager and, following promotion to colonel on 20 June 1953 and having been appointed a Companion of the Order of the Bath in the New Year Honours 1955, he became director of operations and chief of staff for the campaign against EOKA in Cyprus in November 1955 during the Cyprus Emergency, for which he was appointed a Companion of the Order of St Michael and St George in the New Year Honours 1958. He became assistant chief of staff at Headquarters Northern Army Group in February 1959 and, on promotion to major general on 3 February 1960, he was appointed chief-of-staff at Southern Command. He went on to be chief of staff at Supreme Headquarters Allied Powers Europe (SHAPE) in November 1961, in which capacity he was responsible for contingency planning for Berlin at the time of the construction of the Berlin Wall.

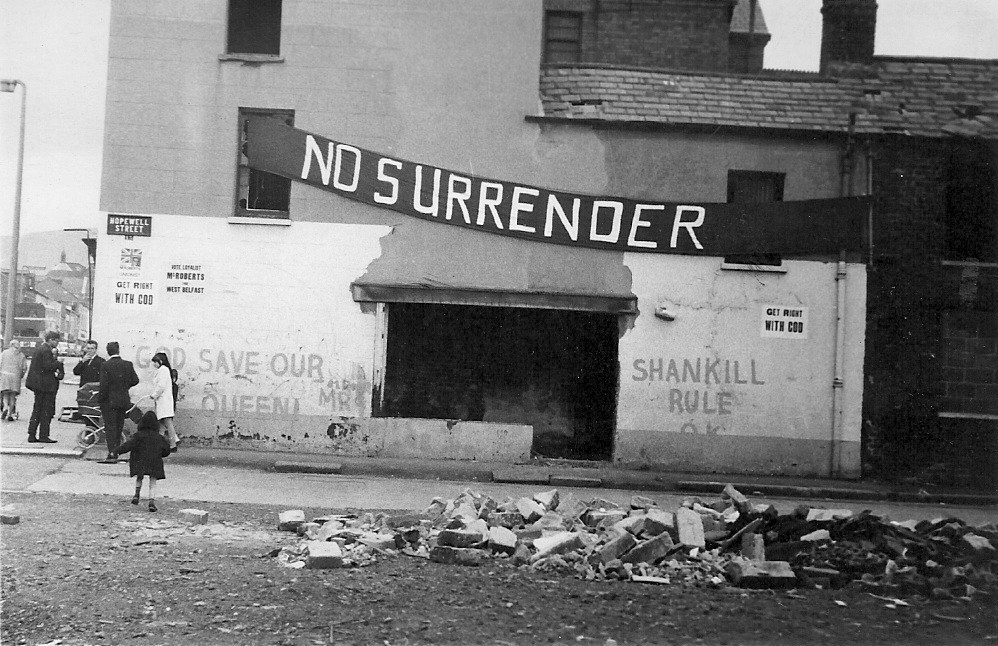
Baker advised the Government on its response to the Troubles in Northern Ireland in 1970

Following his appointment as Vice Chief of the Imperial General Staff with the rank of lieutenant general on 2 September 1963, and having been advanced to Knight Commander of the Order of the Bath in the 1964 New Year Honours, Baker became general officer commanding Southern Command on 31 October 1966. Promoted to general on 7 May 1967 and advanced to Knight Grand Cross of the Order of the Bath in the New Year Honours 1968, Baker was appointed Chief of the General Staff on 1 March 1968. In this role he provided advice to the British Government on the deployment of troops to Northern Ireland at the start of the Troubles: his assessment was that Special Branch had inadequate intelligence on the IRA. He was promoted to field marshal on 31 March 1971, on his retirement from the British Army.

In retirement he became colonel commandant of the Royal Artillery from July 1964, colonel commandant of the Royal Military Police from March 1968, colonel commandant of the Royal Horse Artillery from November 1970 and Master Gunner, St. James's Park from 1970. He was also Constable of the Tower of London from 1 August 1975. He was a governor of both Wellington College and Radley College.

Baker was taken ill at Wellington College and died in hospital on 8 May 1980.

== Family ==
In 1946 he married Valerie Lockhart; they had one daughter (the military artist Alix Baker) and two sons.

== Bibliography ==
- Heathcote, Tony (1999). The British Field Marshals 1736–1997. Barnsley (UK): Pen & Sword. ISBN 0-85052-696-5.
- Baker, Rupert (son). George – A Life so Well Lived (March 2015). Private publication, some copies still available.

Military offices
Preceded by Sir William Pike	Vice Chief of the Imperial General Staff; 1963–1966	Succeeded by Sir Desmond Fitzpatrick
Preceded by Sir Kenneth Darling	GOC-in-C Southern Command; 1966–1968	Succeeded by Sir John Mogg
Preceded by Sir James Cassels	Chief of the General Staff; 1968–1971	Succeeded by Sir Michael Carver
Honorary titles
Preceded by Sir Robert Mansergh	Master Gunner, St. James's Park; 1970–1976	Succeeded by Sir Harry Tuzo
Preceded by Sir Richard Hull	Constable of the Tower of London; 1975–1980	Succeeded by Sir Peter Hunt
