= British Far East Command =

- Active: 1940 to 1942; 1963 to 1971
- Country: United Kingdom
- Type: Command
- Garrison/HQ: Singapore

The Far East Command was a British military command which had 2 distinct periods. These were firstly, 18 November 1940 – 7 January 1942 succeeded by the American-British-Dutch-Australian Command (ABDACOM), and secondly, 1963–1971 succeeded by Australia, New Zealand, and United Kingdom Force (ANZUK Force)

== 1940–1942 ==
The British had several commands with responsibilities East of Suez. General Sir Archibald Wavell, the Commander-in-Chief, India, directed army forces in India. Air force and naval forces in India had separate commanders. The Far East Command under Air Marshal Robert Brooke-Popham and from 23 December 1941 by Lieutenant-General Sir Henry Royds Pownall.

The C-in-C Far East Command was responsible directly to the Chiefs of Staff for the operational control and general direction of training of all British land and air forces in Malaya, Burma, and Hong Kong, and for the co-ordination of plans for the defence of those territories. But the CinC exercised no command or control over any naval forces.

It was intended that C-in-C should deal primarily with matters of major military policy and strategy, but it was not the intention that the C-in-C should assume any administrative or financial responsibilities or take over any of the day-to-day functions at that time exercised by the General (or Air) Officers Commanding (GOC) of the different areas. The degree of "operational control" of British land and air forces, which the Commander-in-Chief Far East should assume, was defined as meaning "the higher direction and control" as distinct from "detailed operational control". To complicate matters, the GOCs correspond with the War Office, Air Ministry, Colonial Office and Local Governor's Offices on all matters on which they had previously dealt with those departments. But the GOCs had to keep the C-in-C informed if he wished.

To enable the Commander-in-Chief Far East to carry out his functions, he was allowed a small staff, initially consisting of seven officers drawn from all three Services with the necessary clerical and cipher staff. For intelligence purposes, he had at his disposal the Far East Combined Bureau, though it remained under Admiralty control. Although the establishment of his staff was later increased to fifteen it was never large enough. The Naval Base was a considerable distance across Singapore from the Malaya Army Headquarters which discouraged frequent meetings.

On 5 December 1941 London gave permission for C-in-C Far East Command to decide if Operation Matador should be activated. The chief strategic decision to be decided was whether Siam should be invaded in a pre-emptive move, before any Japanese landings took place. The Malaya Command was responsible for the planning of Operation Matador.

When the Allied governments appointed Wavell as supreme commander of American-British-Dutch-Australian Command (ABDACOM), British Far East Command became redundant because its functions would in future be carried out by ABDACOM. So when Wavell arrived in Singapore, where the British Far East Command was based, on 7 January 1942, ABDACOM absorbed the British command in its entirety and Pownall became Wavell's Chief of Staff. On 15 January, Wavell moved his headquarters to Lembang near Bandung on Java and assumed control of Allied operations.

=== Commanders-in-Chief ===
Commanders-in-Chief have included:

Command	Headquarters	Rank	Name	Appointed
Far East Command	Singapore Naval Base	Commander-in-Chief	Air Chief Marshal R. Brooke-Popham	18 November 1940
Far East Command	Singapore Naval Base	Commander-in-Chief	Lieutenant-General Sir H. R. Pownall	23 December 1941
Far East Air Force (Royal Air Force)	Seletar Field, Singapore	Air Officer Commanding	Air Vice Marshal J.T. Babington	12 August 1938
Far East Air Force (Royal Air Force)	Seletar Field, Singapore	Air Officer Commanding	Air Vice Marshal C.W.H. Pulford	6 May 1941
Far East Air Force (Royal Air Force)	Seletar Field, Singapore	Air Officer Commanding	Air Vice Marshal P.C. Maltby	11–14 February 1942
Burma Command	Rangoon, Burma	General Officer Commanding	Major General D.K. McLeod	1939
Burma Command	Rangoon, Burma	General Officer Commanding	Lieutenant General T.J. Hutton	29 December 1941
Malaya Command	Army HQ, Singapore	General Officer Commanding	Lieutenant General A.E. Percival	May 1941
British Forces Overseas Hong Kong	Flagstaff House, Hong Kong	General Officer Commanding	Major General C.M. Maltby	August 1941

After the Far East came under the jurisdiction, from August 1943, of South East Asia Command ('SEAC'). The initial land forces operational area for SEAC had been India, Burma, Ceylon, British Malaya, Sumatra, and, for offensive operations, Siam (Thailand) and French Indochina. On 15 August 1945 this was expanded to include the Dutch East Indies and French Indochina. SEAC was disbanded in 1946 and in 1947 the Army Command was reformed under the name Far East Land Forces.

General Officers Commanding included:

- 1947 – 1948 General Sir Neil Ritchie
- 1948 – 1951 General Sir John Harding
- 1951 – 1953 General Sir Charles Keightley
- 1953 – 1956 General Sir Charles Loewen
- 1956 – 1958 General Sir Francis Festing
- 1958 – 1961 General Sir Richard Hull
- 1961 – 1963 Lieutenant General Sir Nigel Poett

== 1963–1971 ==
1963 Far East Command was established, covering the region covered China, Hong Kong, British Commonwealth Occupation Force, Japan and Singapore. Major bases included Hong Kong (HMS Tamar) and Singapore. It was organised as an interservice command:

- Far East Fleet
- Far East Land Forces (FARELF) [British]
- Australian Army Force
- Far East Air Force

On 11 January 1971, Far East Command was disbanded at Singapore, succeeded by ANZUK Force.

=== Commanders-in-Chief ===
Commanders-in-Chief have included:
British Commander-in-Chief, Far East Command

- 24 April 1963 Admiral Sir Varyl Begg
- 28 May 1965 Air Chief Marshal Sir John Grandy
- 1 February 1967 General Sir Michael Carver
- 7 March 1969 Admiral Sir Peter Hill-Norton
- 1970 Air Chief Marshal Sir Brian Burnett

Commander, British Far East Land Forces

- 10 April 1963 Lieutenant General Sir Reginald Hewetson
- 8 June 1964 Lieutenant General Sir Alan Jolly
- 28 July 1966 Lieutenant General Sir Michael Carver
- 31 January 1967 Lieutenant General Sir Thomas Pearson
- 16 November 1968 Lieutenant General Sir Peter Hunt
- 10 October 1970 until 30 October 1971 Major General Sandy Thomas

== See also ==
- RAF Far East Air Force
