= Jim Robertson (British Army officer) =

British Army general

Major-General Jim Robertson CB CBE DSO* DL
- Born: 23 March 1910; Nainital, United Provinces of Agra and Oudh
- Died: 11 February 2004 (aged 93)
- Military career
- Allegiance: United Kingdom
- Branch: British Army
- Service years: 1930–1964
- Rank: Major-General
- Commands: 1st Battalion 7th Gurkha Rifles; 48th Indian Infantry Brigade; 1st Battalion 6th Gurkha Rifles; 51st Infantry Brigade; Land Forces Persian Gulf; 17th Gurkha Division; Land Forces Middle East Command
- Conflicts: Second World War; Malayan Emergency
- Awards: Companion of the Order of the Bath; Commander of the Order of the British Empire; Distinguished Service Order & Bar; Mentioned in Despatches (4)

Major-General James Alexander Rowland Robertson, CB, CBE, DSO & Bar, DL (23 March 1910 – 11 February 2004) was a British Army officer who commanded the 17th Gurkha Division.

== Military career ==
Educated at Epsom College and the Royal Military College, Sandhurst, Robertson was commissioned into the King's Own Yorkshire Light Infantry in 1930 and transferred into the 6th Gurkha Rifles on the North-West Frontier in 1931. He served in the Second World War as Brigade Major of the 1st (Maymyo) Brigade and then as Brigade Major of the 106th Indian Infantry Brigade before becoming commanding officer of 1st Battalion the 7th Gurkha Rifles in Burma in February 1944. In May 1944 his leadership was such that the battalion defended its position under constant fire on the Tiddim-Imphal road and inflicted heavy casualties on the Japanese. He became commander of 48th Indian Infantry Brigade in 1945 and took the surrender of the Japanese forces at Moulmein in South Burma later that year.

After a tour as an instructor at the Staff College, Quetta, he was appointed commanding officer of 1st Battalion 6th Gurkha Rifles in 1947 and brigadier on the General Staff at Malaya Command in 1948 in which roles he saw service during the Malayan Emergency. He undertook staff duties at the War Office in the UK from 1950 at Headquarters I (British) Corps in Germany from 1952. He became commander of 51st Infantry Brigade in the Middle East in 1955 and commander land forces Persian Gulf in 1957 leading the units which re-took Nizwa from the Omani rebels. He went on to be general officer commanding 17th Gurkha Division and major general commanding the Brigade of Gurkhas in 1958 and general officer commanding land forces at Middle East Command in 1961. His last appointment was as Gurkha liaison officer at the War Office in 1963 before retiring in 1964.

In retirement he became director of personnel for the Navy, Army and Air Force Institutes. He was also a deputy lieutenant of Greater London.

== Family ==
In 1949 he married Ann Tosswill, who died of polio shortly after their marriage. In 1973 he married Joan Wills (née Abercromby).

Military offices
Preceded by Richard Anderson	General Officer Commanding 17th Gurkha Division; 1958–1961	Succeeded by Walter Walker
