= Civil Assistance =

Civil Assistance was a British far-right movement in the 1970s, purporting to be a non-governmental civil defence group. It was a voluntary group that aimed to break any planned general strike. It was founded in 1974 by Walter Walker, Commander in Chief of NATO forces in Northern Europe from 1969 to 1972. It was a spin-off of Unison, a civil defence group founded in 1973 by George Kennedy Young, a former deputy director of MI6.

In August 1974 Walker claimed that Civil Assistance had 100,000 members. This provoked the then Labour Defence Secretary, Roy Mason, to interrupt his holiday to release a statement complaining of a 'near fascist groundswell'. Then on 25 February 1975 Walker addressed a meeting of around a hundred Civil Assistance members at St Lawrence Jewry in the City of London. The Communist newspaper the Morning Star claimed to have infiltrated the meeting and to have counted one general, nine colonels and six brigadiers and seven other former officers. Walker supposedly made a speech calling the British Left a 'cancer', organisers of political strikes 'traitors' and Labour MPs subversives. Walker claimed Civil Assistance would 'act' against these and that its members had 'excellent relationships with chief constables'.

Shortly before this speech Margaret Thatcher became Leader of the Conservative Party and Civil Assistance gradually faded from the media.
