= Michael Carver =

British Field Marshal (1915–2001)

Field Marshal The Right Honourable The Lord Carver GCB CBE DSO & Bar MC
- Sir Michael Carver, then a full general, in 1967
- Born: 24 April 1915; Bletchingley, Surrey, England
- Died: 9 December 2001 (aged 86); Fareham, Hampshire, England
- Military career
- Allegiance: United Kingdom
- Branch: British Army
- Service years: 1935–1976
- Rank: Field Marshal
- Nickname: "Mike"
- Service number: 64649
- Units: Royal Tank Regiment
- Commands: Chief of the Defence Staff; Chief of the General Staff; Southern Command; Far East Command; 3rd Infantry Division; 6th Infantry Brigade; 4th Armoured Brigade; 1st Royal Tank Regiment
- Conflicts: Second World War; Western Desert campaign; Italian Campaign; Operation Overlord; North-West Europe campaign of 1944–45; Mau Mau Uprising; Operation Banner
- Awards: Knight Grand Cross of the Order of the Bath; Commander of the Order of the British Empire; Companion of the Distinguished Service Order & Bar; Military Cross; Mentioned in Despatches
- Other work

Member of the House of Lords
- Lord Temporal
- Life peerage 15 July 1977 – 9 December 2001

Personal details
- Party: Crossbencher

Field Marshal Richard Michael Power Carver, Baron Carver, GCB, CBE, DSO & Bar, MC (24 April 1915 – 9 December 2001) was a senior British Army officer. Lord Carver served as the Chief of the General Staff (CGS), the professional head of the British Army, and then as the Chief of the Defence Staff (CDS), the professional head of the British Armed Forces. He served with distinction during the Second World War and organised the administration of British forces deployed in response to the Mau Mau Uprising in Kenya and later in his career provided advice to the British government on the response to the early stages of The Troubles in Northern Ireland.

== Military career ==
=== Early career ===
Carver was born in April 1915, during the First World War, the son of Harold Power Carver, a cotton merchant, and Winifred Anne Gabrielle Carver (née Wellesley) He was educated at Winchester College and the Royal Military College at Sandhurst, where he was awarded the King's Medal, which went to the highest-ranking gentlemen cadet in the order of merit. From Sandhurst, Carver was commissioned as a second lieutenant into the Royal Tank Corps of the British Army on 1 February 1935. After receiving special-to-arm training at the Tank Corps Depot in Bovington, Dorset, he joined the 2nd Battalion of the Royal Tank Corps at Farnborough, Hampshire, in October. He then attended a short course at the Royal Military College of Science before returning to his battalion. He was promoted to lieutenant on 31 January 1938. Soon after this promotion he went to Egypt with the 1st (Light) Battalion of his regiment, which, with the formation of the Royal Armoured Corps (RAC) in April 1939, became the Royal Tank Regiment (RTR), with Carver's battalion becoming the 1st Royal Tank Regiment.

=== Second World War ===
He served in the Second World War, which began in September 1939, with Carver still serving in Egypt. In late December he was made a camp commandant at the headquarters of the Mobile Division (Egypt) which in February 1940 became the 7th Armoured Division. Three months later he was promoted to the acting rank of captain and was made staff captain with the divisional HQ. In this role he was responsible for organising the division's logistical support, a post he held during the early stages of the Western Desert campaign, fought mainly against the Italians, and for which he was later to be mentioned in dispatches, once in April 1941, and again in July.

In the aftermath of the campaign Carver was sent to Palestine where, from April to August, he attended the Staff College, Haifa, before returning to the 7th Armoured Division, now with the acting rank of major, initially as a Deputy Assistant Quartermaster-General (DAQMG) and later as a General Staff Officer Grade 2 (GSO2). The duration of his stay was very short, however, as he was soon sent to Cairo as a GSO2 to help create a new corps HQ, XXX Corps, with which he served until August 1942, which included during Operation Crusader and in many of the most critical battles of the North African campaign in which the corps participated. During that time he was promoted yet again, to the war substantive rank of captain and temporary major, in November 1941. His performance as a staff officer during this period was recognised with his being awarded the Military Cross in September 1942, a month after his promotion to the temporary rank of lieutenant colonel at the relatively young age of twenty-seven. He also received a new appointment at this time, becoming GSO1, essentially chief of staff, of the 7th Armoured Division. He served with this formation in several engagements, including the Second Battle of El Alamein in October 1942, and throughout most of the Tunisian campaign which followed. He received a promotion to the permanent rank of captain in January 1943.

He was appointed Commanding officer of the 1st Royal Tank Regiment in April 1943, leading them in North Africa for which he was appointed a Companion of the Distinguished Service Order (DSO) on 4 May 1943 and in Italy for which he was awarded a Bar to his DSO on 24 February 1944. He was appointed commander of the 4th Armoured Brigade on 27 June 1944 after its previous commander, Brigadier John Cecil Currie, was killed in action. With his new appointment came a promotion to the acting rank of brigadier, making Carver, at just twenty-nine, the youngest of his rank in the British Army. He led his brigade in the remainder of the fighting in Normandy and then throughout the subsequent campaign in North West Europe which followed until the German surrender in May 1945. He was also appointed a Commander of the Order of the British Empire in 1945.

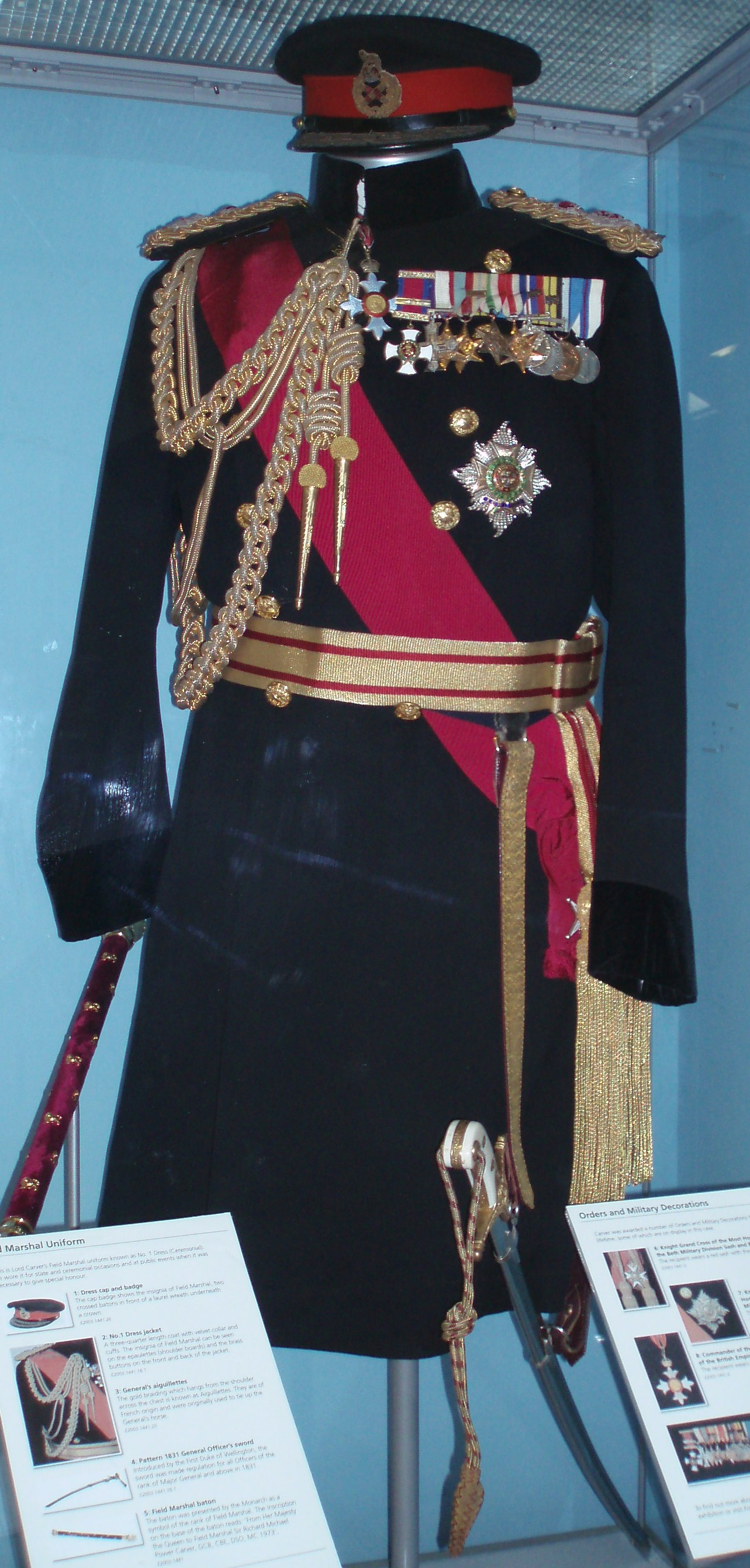
Carver's uniform at the Bovington Tank Museum.

=== Post-War ===
Carver became a Technical Staff officer to the Ministry of Supply in 1947, and having been promoted to the substantive rank of major on 31 January 1948, he became Assistant Quartermaster-General (Plans) at Headquarters Allied Forces Central Europe in May 1951 and then head of the exercise planning staff at SHAPE in October 1952. Having been promoted to lieutenant-colonel on 27 March 1954 and to colonel on 17 June 1954, he was appointed Deputy Chief of Staff at East Africa Command in June 1954; he took part in the closing stages of the response to the Mau Mau Uprising in Kenya for which he was mentioned in despatches on 19 July 1955. He was then elevated to Chief of Staff in East Africa in October 1955 and appointed a Companion of the Order of the Bath on 8 March 1957. After attending the Imperial Defence College during most of 1957, he was appointed Director of Plans at the War Office in London in February 1958, Commander of the 6th Brigade at Münster in January 1960 and General Officer Commanding (GOC) of the 3rd Division with the rank of major-general on 4 September 1962. His division was deployed to Cyprus in February 1964 and he was made Director of Army Staff Duties at the Ministry of Defence on 7 October 1964 and it was in this role that he famously substantially reduced the size of the Territorial Army (TA).

Having been advanced to a Knight Commander of the Order of the Bath in the 1966 Queen's Birthday Honours, he was made GOC Far East Land Forces with the rank of lieutenant-general on 28 July 1966, tri-service Commander-in-Chief of Far East Command in 1967 and, having been promoted to full general on 29 March 1968, GOC Southern Command on 12 May 1969. After being advanced to Knight Grand Cross of the Order of the Bath in the 1970 Birthday Honours, he was appointed Chief of the General Staff (CGS) on 1 April 1971 in which role he provided advice to the British government on the response to the early stages of The Troubles in Northern Ireland. Having been promoted to field marshal on 18 July 1973, he became Chief of the Defence Staff (CDS) on 21 October 1973 before retiring in October 1976. In July 1977 he became a life peer as Baron Carver, of Shackleford in the County of Surrey.

=== Retirement ===
Carver was also Colonel Commandant of the Royal Electrical and Mechanical Engineers from February 1966, of the Royal Tank Regiment from January 1968, of the Bristol University Officer Training Corps from March 1972 and of the Royal Armoured Corps from April 1974.

In August 1977 he was appointed resident commissioner designate for Rhodesia with responsibility for ending the dispute over independence there but resigned after fourteen months of deadlock. He wrote a number of books on military history and was a vocal critic of Britain's Trident missile programme, believing that as the American nuclear strike capability was sufficiently powerful it was inefficient for Britain to have an independent program.

His interests included sailing, tennis and gardening. He died on 9 December 2001 in Fareham, Hampshire.

== Family ==
In 1947 he married Edith Lowry-Corry, a granddaughter of Henry Lowry-Corry; they had two sons and two daughters. Lady Carver died in 2019. Carver's mother was related to Arthur Wellesley, 1st Duke of Wellington.

== Books ==
- Second to None: The Royal Scots Greys 1918–1945 (1946)
- Tobruk (1956, Pan Books) ISBN 0330233769
- El Alamein (1962, Macmillan) ISBN 9780713421484
- The War Lords (edited) (1976, Weidenfeld & Nicolson) ISBN 1844153088
- Harding of Petherton (1978, Weidenfeld & Nicolson) ISBN 002977750X
- The Apostles of Mobility: The Theory and Practice of Armoured Warfare (1979, Weidenfeld & Nicolson) ISBN 0297776819
- War Since 1945 (1980, Orion Publishing) ISBN 0297778463
- A Policy for Peace (1982, Faber and Faber) ISBN 0571119751
- The Seven Ages of the British Army (1984, Beaufort Books) ISBN 0825302412
- Dilemmas of the Desert War: A New Look at the Libyan Campaign, 1940-1942 (1986, Indiana University Press) ISBN 0253317460
- Twentieth-Century Warriors: The Development of the Armed Forces of the Major Military Nations in the Twentieth Century (1987, Weidenfeld & Nicolson) ISBN 0297791605
- Out of Step: Memoirs of a Field Marshal (1989, Hutchinson) ISBN 0091739853
- Tightrope Walking: British Defence Policy Since 1945 (1992, Hutchinson) ISBN 0091746825
- Britain's Army in the 20th Century (1998, Macmillan) ISBN 0333737776
- Imperial War Museum Book of the War in Italy: A Vital Contribution to Victory in Europe 1943–1945 (2002, Pan Books)
- The National Army Museum Book of the Turkish Front 1914–18: The Campaigns at Gallipoli, in Mesopotamia and in Palestine (2003, Sidgwick & Jackson) ISBN 0330491083

== Bibliography ==
- Heathcote, Tony (1999). The British Field Marshals 1736–1997. Barnsley: Pen and Sword Books. ISBN 0-85052-696-5.

Military offices
Preceded by Vivian Street	GOC 3rd Division; 1962–1964	Succeeded by Cecil Blacker
Preceded by Sir Alan Jolly	GOC Far East Land Forces; 1966–1967	Succeeded by Sir Thomas Pearson
Preceded by Sir John Grandy	Commander-in Chief Far East Command; 1967–1969	Succeeded by Sir Peter Hill-Norton
Preceded by Sir David Yates	GOC-in-C Southern Command; 1969–1971	Succeeded by Sir Basil Eugster
Preceded by Sir Geoffrey Baker	Chief of the General Staff; 1971–1973	Succeeded by Sir Peter Hunt
Preceded by Sir Peter Hill-Norton	Chief of the Defence Staff; 1973–1976	Succeeded by Sir Andrew Humphrey
