= Walter Walker (British Army officer) =

British military officer

General Sir Walter Walker KCB CBE DSO & Two Bars
- Born: 11 November 1912; Cuttack, Orissa, British India
- Died: 12 August 2001 (aged 88); Yeovil, England
- Military career
- Allegiance: United Kingdom
- Branch: British Army
- Service years: 1933–1972
- Rank: General
- Service number: 380258
- Units: Sherwood Foresters; 1/8th Gurkha Rifles
- Commands: Allied Forces Northern Europe; Northern Command; British Troops Borneo; 17th Gurkha Division; 99th Gurkha Infantry Brigade
- Conflicts: North-West Frontier; Second World War; Malayan Emergency; Indonesia–Malaysia confrontation
- Awards: Knight Commander of the Order of the Bath; Commander of the Order of the British Empire; Companion of the Distinguished Service Order & Two Bars; Mentioned in Despatches (4); Commander of the Order of the Defender of the Realm (Malaysia)

General Sir Walter Colyear Walker, KCB, CBE, DSO & Two Bars (11 November 1912 – 12 August 2001) was a senior British Army officer who served as Commander-in-Chief of Allied Forces Northern Europe from 1969 until his retirement in 1972. He commanded the 4/8th Gurkhas Rifles against the Japanese Army in Burma during the Second World War and the 99th Gurkha Infantry Brigade Group from 1957 to 1959 during the Malayan Emergency. Walker was Director of Operations in Borneo from 1962 to 1965 during the Indonesia-Malaysia confrontation. In retirement, he attracted some controversy by publicising his views on the political situation in Britain during the mid-1970s.

== Early life ==
Walker was born on a tea plantation in Cuttack, India, on 11 November 1912, one of four sons born to a military family. At the end of the First World War Walker and his family moved back to Britain and he was sent to Blundell's School in Devon. Even as a child Walker had a militaristic streak; in his memoirs Fighting On he writes that he ordered the previously "idle, unpatriotic, unkempt" pupils into "showing the school what smartness on the parade ground meant". His teachers became alarmed at Walker's strict behaviour and tried to explain the difference between "driving" and "leading".

== Military career ==
Walker then went to the Royal Military College, Sandhurst, and in 1933 after a short attachment to the Sherwood Foresters he joined the 1/8th Gurkha Rifles in Quetta which his grandfather had formerly commanded. In 1935 he survived the major earthquake that hit that city. The battalion moved to Assam in the aftermath where it remained until early 1939, Walker was appointed the battalion's adjutant in 1938.

In 1939, Walker moved with his battalion across India to Razmak, on the North West Frontier facing Waziristan, there had been turmoil on the Frontier since 1936, and operations were continuous, a mixture of defensive and offensive operations, some of them "punitive operations" against tribesmen of the North West Frontier in India. Walker distinguished himself and was recommended for the Military Cross, he had come to senior officers' attention and was appointed staff captain at the Razmak Brigade headquarters. His attention to detail enabled him to excel in this role. He was twice mentioned in despatches for his role in the operations on the North West Frontier from 1939 to 1941.

In 1942, Walker was selected to attend the Staff College at Quetta. After this he was appointed General Staff Officer Grade 3 (GSO 3) on the staff of Lieutenant General Slim's Burma Corps, joining them near the oil fields at Yenangyaung in mid April 1942. Walker remained with the HQ as it walked back to India, and was then appointed as an instructor at the Quetta staff college.

In early 1944, Walker was appointed second-in-command, alongside a new commanding officer, of the 4/8th Gurkha Rifles, who had suffered severely in the Arakan Campaign. In March the battalion was moved to the Imphal area where the Japanese had launched a major offensive and spent several months in hard fighting. In November he became the commanding officer, instigated a new training regime, and the battalion's motto "Live Hard, Fight Hard, and when necessary Die Hard".

In early 1945 he led the 4/8th Gurkhas, part of IV Corps, across the River Irrawaddy and hard fighting against the main body of the Japanese Army in Burma. In June he was appointed GSO 1 in his division's (7 Indian Division) Headquarters, although circumstances dictated that he had to return part-time to 4/8th Gurkhas as their commanding officer again. A highly unusual situation. He was mentioned in despatches and at the end of the war he was appointed a Companion of the Distinguished Service Order (DSO) and 7th Indian Infantry Division moved to occupy Thailand where Walker was involved in negotiating the surrender of Japanese forces in that country.

Walker's first post-war posting was as GSO 1 to the Director of Military Operations in General Headquarters (GHQ), Delhi. When GHQ was transferred to Indian control in 1948 he handed over to a future Indian Chief of Army Staff and was appointed GSO 1 in Malaya District Headquarters in Kuala Lumpur.

In 1948, the Emergency was declared in Malaya. Walker's immediate role was to train and equip the irregular Ferret Force. In late 1948 he was appointed commandant of the Far East Land Forces Training Centre in Johore Bahru with the task of training British units, arriving from UK, in jungle fighting. It later became the Jungle Warfare School at Kota Tinggi. He was appointed OBE for his work on Jungle warfare training. He also highlighted the many deficiencies in equipment and neglect of the lessons learned in Burma. He then had his first posting to UK as a student at the Joint Services Staff College. In 1950 he was appointed to command 1/6 Gurkha Rifles. Walker created a very effective jungle fighting battalion with many notable successes, including killing high ranking communists, in the three years he was in command.

He was awarded a Bar to his DSO and was twice mentioned in despatches during the Malayan Emergency. In 1954 he returned to the UK as a senior (Colonel) staff officer in Headquarters Eastern Command where he was involved in planning and mounting the Suez operation in 1956. He also expressed the view that if he had been commanding at Port Said he would have used a Nelsonian eye to signals from London telling him to stop. However, as an up-and-coming senior officer he was selected as an observer to nuclear tests in Maralinga, Australia and subsequently lectures on nuclear battlefield.

In 1957, he was promoted to brigadier and commander of 99th Gurkha Infantry Brigade Group in Malaya. It was an important command, tasked with finally defeating the most formidable remaining terrorists in Johore in Operation Tiger. Walker maintained a good relationship with the police Special Branch, focused on development of intelligence, and made frequent use of ambushes. In Malaya, he demonstrated the ambush skills which he had initially learnt in Waziristan on India's North-West Frontier in 1939 to 1941. He was recognised as a gifted trainer of troops, who inspired confidence and enthusiasm.

In 1959, 99th Brigade was sent to Singapore in advance of the forthcoming elections. Walker was told to take charge of internal security throughout Singapore Island. The 99th Brigade were highly skilled jungle fighters, but urban Singapore was a very different environment, and internal security an entirely new assignment. Walker immediately instituted a typically thorough training programme. No manual existed on the subject, so Walker wrote one. Internal Security in a City became the army standard on the subject. The elections passed peacefully. Walker relinquished command and attended the Imperial Defence College in London. He was unimpressed by the politically tuned officers and considered that politics was the business of politicians not soldiers. During this time he also attended a demonstration of the AR-15 rifle at the Small Arms School at Hythe, and supported the purchase of the gun as both a specialist weapon for jungle combat and a general-issue replacement for the British army's current battle rifles, submachine guns and light machine guns. After the course, in 1961, he was promoted to major general and appointed General Officer Commanding 17th Gurkha Division and major general, Brigade of Gurkhas. 17 Division was the operational headquarters for all non-Malayan formations (99 Gurkha Infantry Brigade and 28 Commonwealth Brigade) and divisional units in Malaya.

Rumours about the axing of the Gurkhas emerged and Walker played an astute hand involving the King of Nepal and the U.S. Ambassador there to protect them. It did not endear him to the Chief of the Imperial General Staff and he came close to being sacked. However, on 8 December 1962, while he was in Nepal visiting Gurkha pensioners in the Himalayas and some days walk from transport, a revolt broke out in Brunei. Walker reached Singapore 9 days later.

Walker was appointed COMBRITBOR on 19 December with command over all British forces (land, sea and air) in the colonies of Sarawak and North Borneo, and the protectorate of Brunei. The revolt was quickly mopped up and incipient revolts in Sarawak prevented by an influx of British and Gurkha troops. However, clues of Indonesian sympathy for the insurgents and emerging hostility caused Walker concern. The situation gradually evolved into the Confrontation. However, Walker was master of the situation and developed an effective operational concept and tactics to contain the threat, and most importantly retain the military initiative. The outcome was a successful campaign ending in August 1966. Walker handed over as commander in March 1965. During the campaign he established good relations with the Labour Defence and Army ministers (Denis Healey and Fred Mulley). He was appointed a Companion of the Order of the Bath, awarded a second bar to the DSO, and made an honorary Commander of the Order of the Defender of the Realm by Malaysia.

He returned to the UK and in 1965 was posted to NATO as Deputy Chief of Staff in charge of Plans, Operations and Intelligence, Headquarters, Allied Forces Central Europe in Paris where his job was to plan and execute the headquarters' move out of France. He accomplished this complex task on time and very efficiently. Promoted and knighted in 1968 he was appointed General Officer Commanding in Chief of Northern Command in the UK from 1967. Finally in 1969 he was promoted to general and appointed NATO's Commander in Chief Allied Forces Northern Europe with headquarters in Oslo. This covered German Jutland, Denmark and Norway but had no direct command responsibilities in peacetime. Walker saw his role as publicising the threat. The region faced an overwhelming and expanding Soviet force and while he did not expect Soviet direct attack he did see a strategic threat of expanding influence aimed at neutralising the Nordic countries (and possibly beyond) and clearing the path into the North Atlantic. Pointing this out did not endear him to some politicians and even his NATO superior. He retired from the army in 1972. Walker was colonel of 7th (Duke of Edinburgh's Own) Gurkha Rifles from 1964 to 1975.

Walker's granddaughter Annabel Venning has carried out extensive research into the war experience of Walter and his five siblings which have been published as To War with the Walkers [2019] Hodder and Stoughton, London.

== Politics ==
Walker then began giving television interviews and then took part in a documentary named A Day in the Life of a General, which was never aired for security reasons, but Walker believed it was banned because he was "revealing the true state of affairs which the politicians are hiding from the public".

By 1974, Walker had grown "shocked" by the state of the country in general and the "militancy" of the trade unions in particular. In July of that year he wrote a letter to The Daily Telegraph calling for "dynamic, invigorating, uplifting leadership... above party politics" to "save" the country from "the Communist Trojan horse in our midst." After the publication of the letter, Walker claimed he received positive responses from Varyl Begg, John Slessor, a few British generals, ex-MPs, the comedian Michael Bentine and the shipping industrialist Lord Cayzer.

Shortly afterward, the London Evening News gave Walker a front-page interview and asked him if he could imagine a situation in which the British Army could take over Britain. Walker responded, "Perhaps the country might choose rule by the gun in preference to anarchy," although Walker always said he hated the idea of a military government in Britain.

By August 1974, Walker had joined the anti-Communist Unison group (later renamed to Civil Assistance), which claimed that it would supply volunteers in the event of a general strike. Walker claimed it had at least 100,000 members, which led Defence Secretary Roy Mason to interrupt his holiday by condemning this "near fascist groundswell." In 1975, Walker travelled to various boardrooms in the City of London in the hope of securing money and support. After Margaret Thatcher was elected leader of the Conservative Party, Walker and Civil Assistance faded from the media; however, he still travelled abroad, including visits to Rhodesia and South Africa.

Walker privately told journalists that he thought Harold Wilson was a "proven Communist" and that there was a "Communist cell" in Downing Street. He advocated Enoch Powell as Prime Minister and favoured "tougher" measures against the IRA. He was an early member of the Conservative Monday Club and in 1984 became Patron of the ultra-conservative and anti-communist Western Goals Institute, a position he retained for the rest of his life.

In 1980, his book The Next Domino?, with a foreword by the Conservative politician Julian Amery, was first published simultaneously in the UK, the US, and South Africa. In the 1980s, Walker's health began to decline and he underwent two hip operations in military hospitals. They left him permanently disabled which led to Walker suing the Ministry of Defence in 1990. The suit was eventually settled out of court, for £130,000.

== Personal life ==
In 1939, Walker married Beryl Johnston, with whom he had two sons and one daughter; his wife died in 1990. He lived in Dorset.

Walker died at Yeovil Hospital on 12 August 2001, aged 88, from complications of a fall and pneumonia.

== Publications ==
- The Bear at the Back Door. Foreign Affairs Publishing Co. 1978. ISBN 978-0900380235.
- The Next Domino?. Covenant Book. 1980. ISBN 978-0852050057.
- Fighting On. New Millennium. 1997. ISBN 978-1858451701.

== Notes ==
Military offices
Preceded by Jim Robertson	GOC 17th Gurkha Division; 1961–1964	Succeeded by Peter Hunt
Preceded by Sir Geoffrey Musson	GOC-in-C Northern Command; 1967–1969	Succeeded by Sir Cecil Blacker
Preceded by Sir Kenneth Darling	C-in-C Allied Forces Northern Europe; 1969–1972	Succeeded by Sir Thomas Pearson
