= Cecil Blacker =

British Army general (1916–2002)

General Sir Cecil Blacker GCB OBE MC
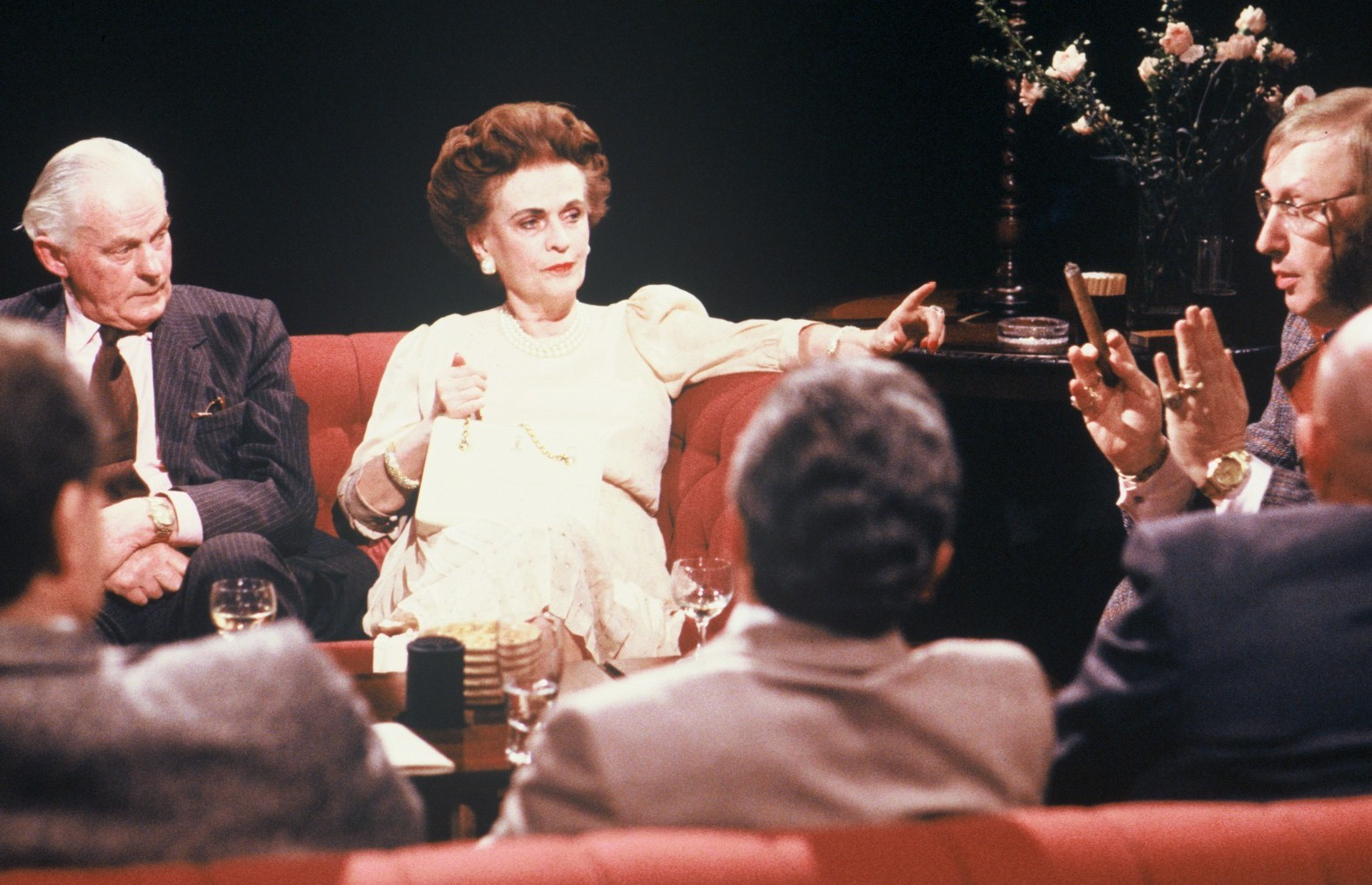
- Appearing (left) on television discussion programme After Dark in 1988: "Horse Racing"
- Born: Cecil Hugh Blacker; 4 June 1916; York, United Kingdom
- Died: 18 October 2002 (aged 86)
- Military career
- Allegiance: United Kingdom
- Branch: British Army
- Service years: 1936–1976
- Rank: General
- Service number: 67083
- Unit: 5th Royal Inniskilling Dragoon Guards
- Commands: 23rd Hussars; 5th Royal Inniskilling Dragoon Guards; 39th Infantry Brigade Group; 3rd Division; Northern Command
- Conflicts: Second World War
- Awards: Knight Grand Cross of the Order of the Bath; Officer of the Order of the British Empire; Military Cross

General Sir Cecil Hugh Blacker, GCB, OBE, MC (4 June 1916 – 18 October 2002) was a senior British Army officer and a former Adjutant-General to the Forces.

== Military career ==
Educated at Wellington College and at the Royal Military College, Sandhurst, Cecil Blacker was commissioned into the 5th Royal Inniskilling Dragoon Guards in January 1936.

He was adjutant of the regiment during the Dunkirk evacuation in May/June 1940, in the opening months of the Second World War. He later transferred to the 23rd Hussars which then formed part of the 11th Armoured Division. He was awarded the Military Cross in 1944 following Operation Goodwood and went on to become commanding officer of the 23rd Hussars in 1945.

Blacker commanded the 5th Royal Inniskilling Dragoon Guards from 1955 to 1957. He was then Military Assistant to the Chief of the Imperial General Staff, Field Marshal Sir Gerald Templer from 1958 to 1960. He was appointed Commander of 39th Infantry Brigade in Northern Ireland in 1962 and was then general officer commanding (GOC) of the 3rd Division from 1964 to 1966.

He was appointed general officer commanding-in-chief Northern Command in 1969 and then went on to become Vice Chief of the General Staff in 1970 before becoming Adjutant General in 1973: he held this post until he retired in 1976. In 1974 his home was badly damaged by an IRA bomb

He was ADC General to the Queen from 1974 to 1976. He was also Colonel of the 5th Royal Inniskilling Dragoon Guards from 1972 to 1981.

Blacker was appointed a Companion of the Order of the Bath in 1967, a Knight Commander of the Order of the Bath in 1969 and a Knight Grand Cross of the Order of the Bath in 1975. He was also appointed an Officer of the Order of the British Empire in 1960.

He lived in Hook Norton near Banbury in Oxfordshire.

== Showjumping ==
Blacker was an Amateur Steeplechaser and International Showjumper. He rode in the 1948 Grand National. He rode Pointsman to win the Grand Military Gold Cup at Cheltenham in 1954. He represented Great Britain in Showjumping from 1959 to 1961. He was President both of the British Showjumping Association from 1976 to 1980 and of the British Equestrian Federation from 1980 to 1984. He was a member of the Horse Race Betting Levy Board from 1980 to 1983.

== Family ==
In 1947 he married Felicity Mary Rew and together they went on to have two sons, writer Terence Blacker and sculptor and former jockey Philip Blacker.

Military offices
Preceded by Michael Carver	GOC 3rd Division; 1964–1966	Succeeded by Tony Deane-Drummond
Preceded by Sir Walter Walker	GOC-in-C Northern Command; 1969–1970	Succeeded by Sir William Jackson
Preceded by Sir Victor FitzGeorge-Balfour	Vice Chief of the General Staff; 1970–1973	Succeeded by Sir David Fraser
Preceded by Sir John Mogg	Adjutant General; 1973–1976	Succeeded by Sir Jack Harman
