= Geoffrey Musson =

British Army officer

General Sir Geoffrey Musson GCB CBE DSO
- Born: 9 June 1910; Yockleton, Shropshire, England
- Died: 10 January 2008 (aged 97)
- Military career
- Allegiance: United Kingdom
- Branch: British Army
- Service years: 1930–1970
- Rank: General
- Service number: 45438
- Unit: King's Shropshire Light Infantry
- Commands: Northern Command (1964–1967); 5th Division (1958–1959); 7th Armoured Division (1958); Commonwealth Forces in Korea (1954–1955); 36th Infantry Brigade (1944–1946); 2nd Battalion, Duke of Cornwall's Light Infantry (1943–1944)
- Conflicts: Second World War
- Awards: Knight Grand Cross of the Order of the Bath; Commander of the Order of the British Empire; Distinguished Service Order; Mentioned in Despatches

General Sir Geoffrey Randolph Dixon Musson, GCB, CBE, DSO (9 June 1910 – 10 January 2008) was a senior British Army officer who served during the Second World War and the Korean War and later became Adjutant-General to the Forces in the late 1960s.

== Military career ==
Educated at Shrewsbury School and at Trinity Hall, Cambridge, Geoffrey Musson was commissioned into the King's Shropshire Light Infantry in 1930. During the Second World War he served in North Africa and Italy. He was commanding officer of the 2nd Duke of Cornwall's Light Infantry from 1943 to 1944 and commander of the 36th Infantry Brigade from 1944 to 1946. He was awarded the Distinguished Service Order in May 1944 for making an assault crossing of the Gari River, establishing a bridgehead on the far bank, covering the construction of ferries to allow the rest of the brigade to cross and then securing an important vantage point overlooking Monte Cassino.

Musson commanded the Commonwealth Forces in Korea from 1954 to 1955, and in 1956 he became commandant of the Infantry Training Centre. In 1958 he was appointed general officer commanding 7th Armoured Division, going on to be General Officer Commanding 5th Division later that year. He then served as Chief of Staff of Middle East Land Forces from 1959 to 1962. He became Commander-in-Chief Northern Command in 1964, and Adjutant General in 1967. He retired from the British Army in 1970.

Musson was Colonel Commandant of the King's Shropshire Light Infantry from 1963 to 1968 and Colonel Commandant of The Light Infantry from 1968 to 1972. He lived in Hurstbourne Tarrant near Andover, Hampshire.

Musson was appointed a Companion of the Order of the Bath in 1959, a Knight Commander of the Order of the Bath in 1965 and a Knight Grand Cross of the Order of the Bath in 1970. He was also appointed a Commander of the Order of the British Empire in 1945.

In retirement Musson was vice-chairman of the National Savings Committee.

== Family ==
In 1939 Musson married Elspeth Lorraine and together they went on to have one son and one daughter.

Military offices
Preceded by Cosmo Nevill	Commandant of the School of Infantry; 1956–1958	Succeeded by Charles Harington
Preceded by John Hackett	GOC 7th Armoured Division; February – April 1958	Post disbanded
New command Division reformed (Post last held by John Churcher)	GOC 5th Division; 1958–1959	Division disbanded (Post next held by Walter Thomas)
Preceded by Sir Charles Richardson	GOC-in-C Northern Command; 1964–1967	Succeeded by Sir Walter Walker
Preceded by Sir Reginald Hewetson	Adjutant General; 1967–1970	Succeeded by Sir John Mogg
