= Reginald Hewetson =

British Army general (1908–1993)

General Sir Reginald Hewetson GCB CBE DSO
- Born: 4 August 1908; Shortlands, Kent, England
- Died: 19 January 1993 (aged 84)
- Spouse: Patricia Burkitt
- Military career
- Allegiance: United Kingdom
- Branch: British Army
- Service years: 1928–1967
- Rank: General
- Service number: 40386
- Unit: Royal Artillery
- Commands: Far East Land Forces (1963–1964); British Forces in Hong Kong (1961–1963); Staff College, Camberley (1958–1961); 4th Division (1956–1957); 11th Armoured Division (1956); 6th Field Regiment, Royal Artillery (1944); 121st Field Regiment, Royal Artillery (1943–1944)
- Conflicts: Second World War
- Awards: Knight Grand Cross of the Order of the Bath; Commander of the Order of the British Empire; Companion of the Distinguished Service Order

General Sir Reginald Hackett Hewetson, GCB, CBE, DSO (4 August 1908 – 19 January 1993) was a senior British Army officer and a former Adjutant-General to the Forces.

== Military career ==
Educated at Repton School and at the Royal Military Academy, Woolwich, Reginald Hewetson was commissioned into the Royal Artillery in 1928. He served in India from 1929 to 1935.

During the Second World War Hewetson served in France, North Africa and Italy. He was appointed a Companion of the Distinguished Service Order for his service during the war. In 1942 he served in the Tunisian campaign as a General Staff Officer (GSO) with the lines of communication of the British First Army, before being made a GSO Grade 1 (with the 78th Infantry Division, also serving with the First Army in the fighting in Tunisia. The division later fought in the Allied invasion of Sicily in July–August 1943 but Hewetson left to take command of the 121st Field Regiment, Royal Artillery, then fighting in Italy, before then assuming command of the 6th Field Regiment, also fighting in Italy, sometime in 1944. He returned again to the 78th Division, this time as the division's Commander, Royal Artillery. Once again, his stay was short as he was soon sent to X Corps as its Brigadier General Staff (BGS), a position he held until then end of the war in 1945.

Hewetson was BGS of the British Army in Austria from 1945 to 1947. In 1949 he attended the Imperial Defence College in London and then, in 1953, he was appointed was Commander, Royal Artillery within the 2nd Division in Germany and in March 1956 he became General Officer Commanding 11th Armoured Division. In April 1956 the 11th Armoured Division was reformed under his command as the 4th Division and in 1958 he became Commandant of the Staff College, Camberley. In 1961 he was appointed Commander of British Forces in Hong Kong and in 1963 he became General Officer Commanding Far East Land Forces, a post he held until 1964 when he became Adjutant General. He retired from the British Army in 1967.

Hewetson was also Colonel Commandant of the Royal Artillery from 1962 to 1973. He was ADC General to the Queen from 1966 to 1967. He was appointed a Companion of the Order of the Bath in 1958, a Knight Commander of the Order of the Bath in 1962 and a Knight Grand Cross of the Order of the Bath in 1966. He was also appointed an Officer of the Order of the British Empire in 1943 and a Commander of the Order of the British Empire in 1945.

A service to commemorate his life was held on 12 February 1993. He lived in Uckfield, East Sussex.

Hewetson was also a first class cricket player who played for the Europeans in the Bombay Quadrangular in 1929.

== Family ==
Hewetson married Patricia Burkitt.

Military offices
Preceded by John Anderson	GOC 11th Armoured Division; March–April 1956	Division reformed as 4th Division
New command Division reformed	GOC 4th Division; 1956–1957	Succeeded by Gerald Hopkinson
Preceded by Nigel Poett	Commandant of the Staff College, Camberley; 1958–1961	Succeeded by Charles Harington
Preceded by Sir Roderick McLeod	Commander of British Forces in Hong Kong; 1961–1963	Succeeded by Sir Richard Craddock
Preceded by Sir Nigel Poett	GOC Far East Land Forces; 1963–1964	Succeeded by Sir Alan Jolly
Preceded by Sir James Cassels	Adjutant General; 1964–1967	Succeeded by Sir Geoffrey Musson
