= Derek Horsford =

British Army general (1917–2007)

Major-General Derek Horsford CBE DSO*
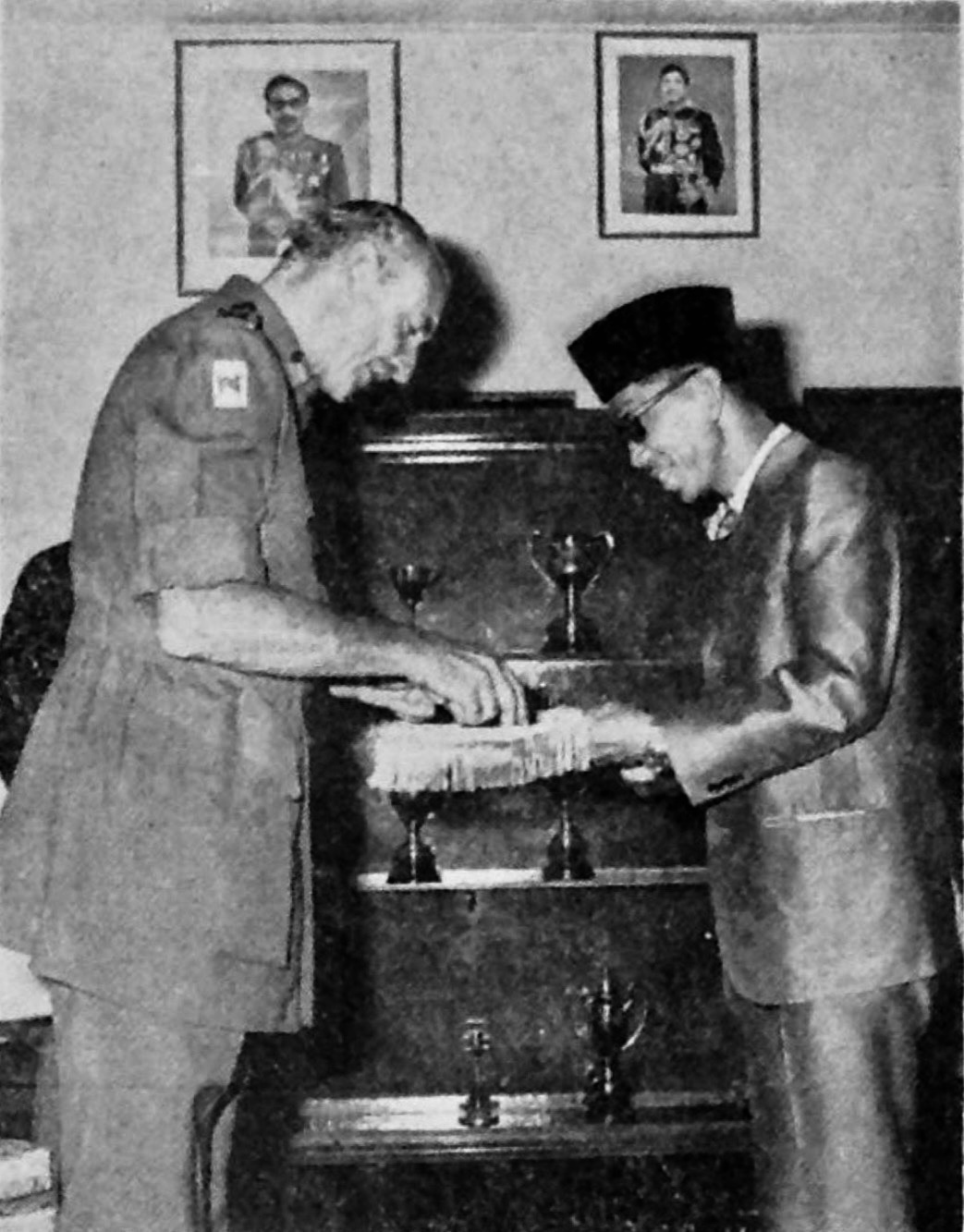
- Major-general Horsford and Pengiran Yusof in Brunei, 1970
- Born: 7 February 1917; London, United Kingdom
- Died: 5 October 2007 (aged 90)
- Military career
- Allegiance: United Kingdom
- Branch: British Army
- Service years: 1938–1971
- Rank: Major-General
- Service number: 380035
- Commands: 4th Battalion, 1st Gurkha Rifles; 1st Bn King's Regiment; 24th Infantry Brigade; 50th (Northumbrian) Division/District; Yorkshire District; 17th Gurkha Division
- Conflicts: Second World War; Battle of Kohima; Korean War
- Awards: Commander of the Order of the British Empire; Distinguished Service Order & bar

Major-General Derek Gordon Thomond Horsford CBE DSO & bar (7 February 1917 – 5 October 2007) was a British Army officer who commanded the 17th Gurkha Division.

== Military career ==
Educated at Clifton College and the Royal Military College, Sandhurst, Horsford was commissioned into the 8th Gurkha Rifles in Quetta in 1938. He saw active service in the Second World War and became commanding officer of 4th Battalion the 1st Gurkha Rifles in 1944. He led his battalion at the Battle of Kohima securing Hunter's Hill in Burma under heavy fire.

After a tour on the staff of General Sir Claude Auchinleck in Delhi, he transferred to the Royal Artillery and became an instructor at the Staff College, Camberley, in 1950. After service in Korea, he was appointed commanding officer of 1st Battalion the King's Regiment on its formation in 1958. After service as assistant adjutant-general at the War Office, in 1960 he was appointed commander of 24th Infantry Brigade in which role he was rushed to Kuwait to respond to the threat from Abdul Kassem who had seized power in Iraq. He went on to be assistant chief of staff (operations) at the Ministry of Defence in 1964, general officer commanding 50th (Northumbrian) Division/District of the Territorial Army in 1966 and general officer commanding Yorkshire District in 1967. His last appointments were as General Officer Commanding 17th Gurkha Division and Malaya District in 1969 and deputy commander land forces, Hong Kong in 1970 before retiring in 1971.

From 1965 to 1970 he was colonel of the King's Regiment.

== Family ==
In 1948 he married Sheila Kitson (née Crawford); they had a son, a stepson and two stepdaughters. Following the death of his first wife, he married Gillian Moorhouse (née Horsford), who brought him two more stepsons, in 1996.

Military offices
Preceded by Richard Keith-Jones	GOC 50th (Northumbrian) Division/District; 1966–1967	Succeeded by Rex Whitworth (as GOC North East District)
Preceded by Arthur Patterson	General Officer Commanding 17th Gurkha Division; 1969–1970	Succeeded by Post Disbanded
