= Thomas Pearson (British Army officer, born 1914) =

British Army general (1914–2019)

General Sir Thomas Pearson KCB CBE DSO & Bar
- Born: 1 July 1914; Queenstown, Ireland
- Died: 15 December 2019 (aged 105)
- Military career
- Allegiance: United Kingdom
- Branch: British Army
- Service years: 1934–1974
- Rank: General
- Service number: 63639
- Units: Rifle Brigade (The Prince Consort's Own); Parachute Regiment
- Commands: Allied Forces Northern Europe; Far East Land Forces; 1st Division; 16th Independent Parachute Brigade; 45th Parachute Brigade; 7th Battalion, Parachute Regiment; 1st Battalion, Parachute Regiment; 2nd Battalion, Rifle Brigade (The Prince Consort's Own)
- Conflicts: Arab revolt in Palestine; Second World War; Palestine Emergency; Malayan Emergency
- Awards: Knight Commander of the Order of the Bath; Commander of the Order of the British Empire; Companion of the Distinguished Service Order & Bar; Mentioned in Despatches; King Haakon VII Freedom Cross (Norway)

General Sir Thomas Cecil Hook Pearson, KCB, CBE, DSO & Bar (1 July 1914 – 15 December 2019) was a senior officer of the British Army who served as commander-in-chief of Allied Forces Northern Europe from 1972 to 1974. At the time of his death, he was the oldest living British full general.

== Background and early career ==
Thomas Pearson was born on 1 July 1914, shortly before the First World War began, in Queenstown, Ireland. He was the son of Commander (later Vice-admiral) John Lewis Pearson (1878–1965), a Royal Navy officer, and Phoebe Charlotte Pearson.

A member of a notable Staffordshire family with a long tradition of service in India and the British Armed Forces, Pearson was the fourth generation of his family to achieve general officer or flag rank. His great-great-grandfather John Pearson (1771–1841) was a barrister and senior East India Company official who served as Advocate-General of Bengal from 1824 to 1840. His great-grandfather General Thomas Hooke Pearson CB (1806–1892) served as an ADC to the Earl Amherst, then Governor-General of India. He fought under Lord Combermere at the Siege of Bharatpur and served with the 16th The Queen's Lancers in the Gwalior campaign (Maharajpur) and the First Anglo-Sikh War (Badowal, Aliwal and Sobraon), commanding a regiment at Sobraon and being mentioned in despatches. His grandfather, Admiral Sir Hugo Pearson KCB (1843–1912) joined the Royal Navy and rose to command the Australia Station, before retiring as Commander-in-Chief, The Nore in 1907.

Pearson was educated at Charterhouse School, and the Royal Military College, Sandhurst, from where he, along with another future general officer, Douglas Darling, was commissioned as a second lieutenant into the Rifle Brigade (The Prince Consort's Own) on 30 August 1934. He was promoted to lieutenant on 31 August 1937.

== Second World War ==
Pearson served in the Second World War, initially as a staff captain in the Middle East. He was appointed a Companion of the Distinguished Service Order (DSO) in 1941 as a temporary captain. He was promoted to captain on 30 August 1942 and became commanding officer of 2nd Battalion Rifle Brigade that year, with the ranks of war substantive major and temporary lieutenant colonel. He took part in the Second Battle of El Alamein, a turning-point in the war, and was awarded a Bar to his DSO on 19 August 1943.

In 1943, Pearson became a general staff officer, first at Force Headquarters and then in the Middle East. On 8 December 1944, he was promoted to war-substantive lieutenant-colonel and temporary colonel. He was appointed deputy commander of 2nd Independent Parachute Brigade Group in 1944 and then deputy commander of 1st Airlanding Brigade in 1945.

== Post-war career ==
After the war, Pearson was made commanding officer of 1st Battalion Parachute Regiment in 1946 and commanding officer of 7th Battalion Parachute Regiment in 1947. He was promoted to the substantive rank of major on 30 August 1947.

Brevetted lieutenant colonel on 1 July 1951, Pearson became a general staff officer serving at the War Office, then at Malaya Headquarters and then at Headquarters Far East Land Forces. He was appointed an Officer of the Order of the British Empire for his service in Malaya on 30 October 1953. He became an instructor at the Joint Services Staff College in 1953, commander of 45th Parachute Brigade in 1955 with the temporary rank of brigadier. He was promoted to colonel on 3 April 1955 and became commander, 16th Independent Parachute Brigade in 1957. He was appointed a Commander of the Order of the British Empire in the 1959 New Year Honours list. He was appointed chief of staff to the director of operations in Cyprus in 1960 and head of the British Military Mission to the Soviet Zone of Germany in 1960.

Pearson became general officer commanding 1st Division on 4 November 1961 with the temporary rank of major general, and was retroactively promoted to major general from that date on 8 December. He relinquished this appointment on 5 November 1963 and was appointed chief of staff for Northern Army Group on 14 December 1963. Pearson was appointed a Companion of the Order of the Bath in the 1964 New Year Honours list. Relinquishing his appointment as chief of staff, Northern Army Group on 28 October 1966, he was appointed general officer commanding, Far East Land Forces on 1 February 1967 and promoted to lieutenant general with seniority from 12 June 1966. He was knighted as a Knight Commander of the Order of the Bath in that year's Birthday Honours list. After relinquishing his appointment as GOC Far East on 16 November 1968, Pearson was appointed military secretary at the Ministry of Defence on 13 January 1969.

Vacating his appointment of military secretary on 2 February 1972, Pearson received his final appointment as commander-in-chief, Allied Forces Northern Europe on 9 February 1972, with the rank of general (seniority from 7 January 1972). He relinquished this appointment on 18 September 1974 and retired on 27 December after a 40-year career. In June 2009 he was present at the unveiling of an updated display at the Royal Green Jackets Museum.

Pearson died on 15 December 2019 at the age of 105.

== Arms ==
Coat of arms of Thomas Pearson

Crest
In front of a demi-sun in splendour proper, a parrot's head erased argent, gorged with a collar nebuly azure
Escutcheon
Per fesse nebuly, azure and sable, in chief, two suns in splendour, and in base, issuant from a mount, a sun-flower, stalked and leaved, all proper
Orders
Knight Commander of the Order of the Bath (KCB)
Commander of the Order of the British Empire (CBE)
Companion of the Distinguished Service Order (DSO)

Military offices
Preceded by Alan Jolly	General Officer Commanding 1st Division; 1961–1963	Succeeded by Miles Fitzalan-Howard
Preceded by Sir Michael Carver	General Officer Commanding Far East Land Forces; 1967–1968	Succeeded by Sir Peter Hunt
Preceded by Sir Richard Goodwin	Military Secretary; 1969–1972	Succeeded by Sir John Sharp
Preceded by Sir Walter Walker	Commander-in-Chief Allied Forces Northern Europe; 1972–1974	Succeeded by Sir John Sharp
