= Arthur Patterson =

British Army general

Major-General Arthur Patterson CB DSO OBE MC
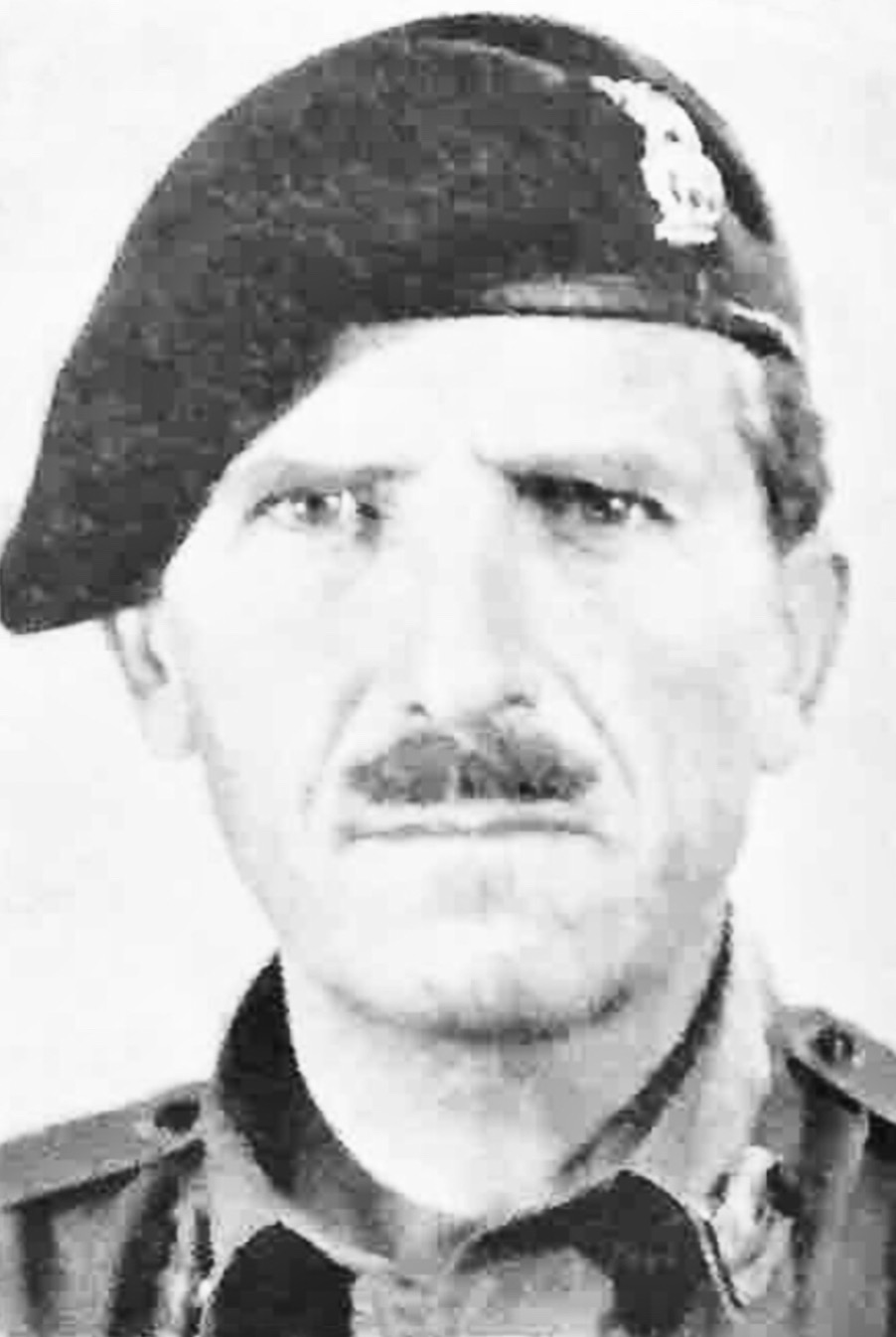
- Brigadier Patterson in 1962
- Born: 24 July 1917; British India
- Died: 27 May 1996 (aged 78); Benenden, Kent
- Military career
- Allegiance: United Kingdom
- Branch: British Army
- Service years: 1938–1972
- Rank: Major-General
- Commands: 17th Gurkha Division
- Conflicts: World War II; Malayan Emergency; Indonesia–Malaysia confrontation
- Awards: Companion of the Order of the Bath; Distinguished Service Order; Officer of the Order of the British Empire; Military Cross

Major-General Arthur Gordon Patterson CB DSO OBE MC (24 July 1917 – 27 May 1996) was a British Army officer who commanded 17th Gurkha Division.

== Military career ==
Patterson was born in British India, the son of Arthur Abbey Patterson of the Indian Civil Service, and educated at Tonbridge School, Kent. He was commissioned into the British Indian Army in 1938. He served in World War II with the 6th Gurkha Rifles being awarded the Military Cross for his exploits in Burma in May 1945. In 1951 he was deployed to Malaya at the height of the Malayan Emergency for which he was appointed MBE. He was later given command of a battalion of his Regiment and appointed OBE for further service in Malaya. In 1964, as a temporary Brigadier during the Indonesia–Malaysia confrontation, he took part in the response to the Brunei Revolt rounding up escaped rebel leaders in the swamps and jungles over a wide area of North Borneo for which he was awarded the DSO. He was appointed General Officer Commanding 17th Gurkha Division in December 1965 and Director of Military Training in June 1969 before retiring in 1972.

He was given the Colonelcy of the 6th Queen Elizabeth's Own Gurkha Rifles from 1969 to 1974.

== Honours ==
- Order of the Bath (CB)
- Distinguished Service Order (DSO) (1964)
- Order of the British Empire Officer (OBE) (1951)
- Military Cross (MC) (May 1945)

Military offices
| Preceded by Peter Hunt | GOC 17th Gurkha Division; 1965–1969 | Succeeded by Derek Horsford |
