= David Hardy (businessman) =

British businessman (1930–2020)

Sir David Hardy
- Born: David William Hardy; 14 July 1930
- Died: 9 April 2020 (aged 89)
- Education: Wellington College
- Occupation: Businessman
- Known for: Chairman of the Docklands Light Railway, London Docklands Development Corporation and the National Maritime Museum
- Spouse: Rosemary Collins (m. 1957)
- Children: 2
- Parent: John Hardy
- Relatives: Sir Godfrey Collins (father-in-law)

Sir David William Hardy (14 July 1930 – 9 April 2020) was a British businessman.

== Early life ==
David William Hardy was born on 14 July 1930, the son of Brigadier John Hardy MC, an officer in the King's Own Royal Regiment, who commanded the Nile Valley during the Second World War.

He was educated at Wellington College, which "he greatly disliked", and qualified as a chartered accountant with Hodgson Morris in Liverpool, before completing his national service in Germany with the Royal Horse Artillery.

== Career ==
Hardy was chairman of the Docklands Light Railway (DLR) from 1984 to 1987, and then chairman of the London Docklands Development Corporation from 1987 to 1992. He once had a DLR train reversed in order to pick up the Queen.

He was chairman of the National Maritime Museum from 1995 to 2005.

He was knighted in the 1992 Birthday Honours, for his role as chairman of the London Docklands Development Corporation.

== Personal life ==
In 1957, he married Rosemary Collins, daughter of Sir Godfrey Collins, who had been chief secretary to the government of Bombay. They had a son and daughter together.
