= Peter Hunt (British Army officer) =

British Army general (1916–1988)

General Sir Peter Hunt GCB DSO OBE DL
- Born: 11 March 1916; London, England
- Died: 2 October 1988 (aged 72)
- Military career
- Allegiance: United Kingdom
- Branch: British Army
- Service years: 1936–1976
- Rank: General
- Service number: 67201
- Unit: Queen's Own Cameron Highlanders
- Commands: Chief of the General Staff; British Army of the Rhine; Far East Land Forces; Royal Military Academy Sandhurst; 17th Gurkha Division; 152nd (Highland) Infantry Brigade; 1st Battalion Queen's Own Cameron Highlanders; Seaforth Highlanders
- Conflicts: Second World War; Indonesia–Malaysia confrontation Operation Banner
- Awards: Knight Grand Cross of the Order of the Bath; Companion of the Distinguished Service Order; Officer of the Order of the British Empire; Chevalier of the Order of Leopold II (Belgium); Croix de guerre (Belgium)
- Other work: Constable of the Tower of London (1980–85)

General Sir Peter Mervyn Hunt, GCB, DSO, OBE, DL (11 March 1916 – 2 October 1988) was Chief of the General Staff, the professional head of the British Army, from 1973 to 1976. He served in the Second World War and commanded British Forces deployed in response to the Indonesia–Malaysia confrontation. Later in his career he provided advice to the British Government at a time of continuing tension associated with the Troubles in Northern Ireland.

== Military career ==
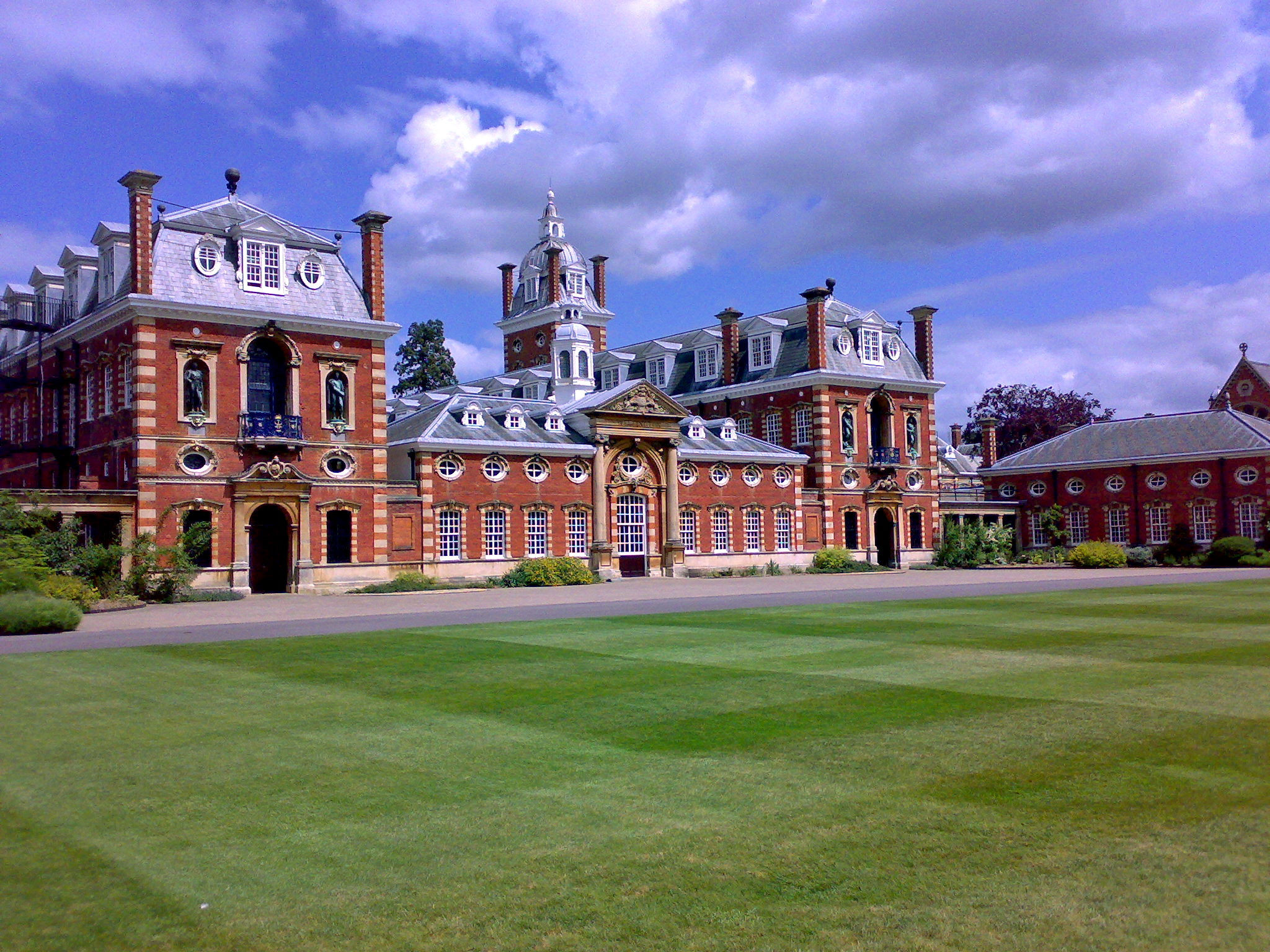
Wellington College, where Hunt was educated

Hunt was the son of H. V. Hunt and educated at Wellington College and the Royal Military College, Sandhurst. He was commissioned into the Queen's Own Cameron Highlanders on 30 January 1936.

He saw action during the Second World War and was promoted to captain on 30 January 1944. Later that year he was given the temporary rank of lieutenant colonel and appointed commanding officer of the Seaforth Highlanders, leading them in North West Europe and being appointed a Companion of the Distinguished Service Order on 10 May 1945. After the war he was appointed a Chevalier of the Order of Leopold II of Belgium and Croix de guerre.

Appointed an Officer of the Order of the British Empire in the New Year Honours 1948, he was given the substantive rank of major on 30 June 1949 and became an instructor at the Staff College, Camberley from 1952 and then an instructor at the Imperial Defence College from 1956 before being promoted to lieutenant colonel on 7 June 1957 and being given command of the 1st Battalion of the Queen's Own Cameron Highlanders. Promoted to colonel on 7 March 1960, he became Commander of 152nd (Highland) Infantry Brigade in 1960 and Chief of Staff at Scottish Command in 1962.

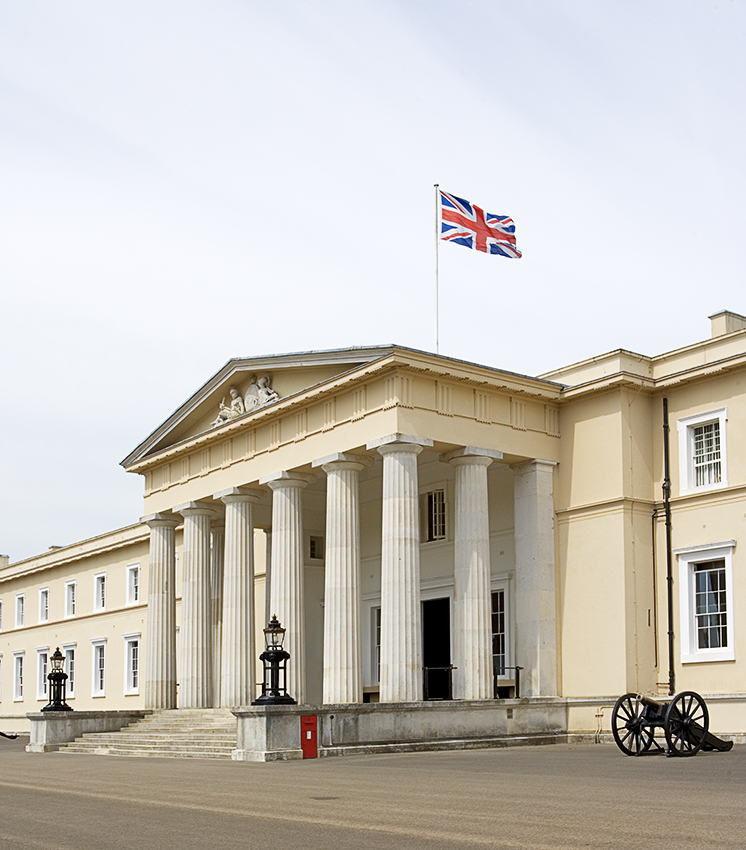
Hunt served as Commandant of the Royal Military Academy Sandhurst.

Hunt was appointed general officer commanding (GOC) of the 17th Gurkha Division and Land Forces Borneo and promoted to major general on 1 February 1964 (the post was redesignated 17th Gurkha Division and Malaya District from 1 December 1965 when the Indonesia–Malaysia confrontation drew to a close). For his service in Borneo he was appointed a Companion of the Order of the Bath. He was appointed Commandant of the Royal Military Academy Sandhurst on 19 January 1966 and went on to be general officer commanding Far East Land Forces with the rank of lieutenant general on 16 November 1968. Advanced to Knight Commander of the Order of the Bath in the New Year Honours 1969, he became Commander Northern Army Group and Commander-in-Chief of the British Army of the Rhine with the rank of general on 1 December 1970. Advanced to Knight Grand Cross of the Order of the Bath in the New Year Honours 1973 and also appointed ADC General to the Queen that year, Hunt was appointed Chief of the General Staff on 19 July 1973 at a time of continuing tension associated with the Troubles in Northern Ireland. He retired from the British Army on 12 August 1976.

He was also Colonel of the Queen's Own Highlanders (Seaforth and Camerons) from 7 February 1966 to 1975 and Colonel of the 10th Princess Mary's Own Gurkha Rifles from 1 August 1966 to 1975.

In retirement Hunt became Constable of the Tower of London from 1 August 1980 and Deputy Lieutenant of Cornwall from 4 August 1982. He lived at Portloe in Cornwall.

Hunt's personal interests included shooting and medical charities: he was President of the National Smallbore Rifle Association and Chairman of the Council of the King Edward VII's Hospital in London. He died on 2 October 1988.

== Family ==
In 1940 he married Anne Stopford; they had one son and one daughter. Following the death of his first wife he married Susan Davidson in 1978.

Military offices
| Preceded by Walter Walker | General Officer Commanding 17th Gurkha Division; 1964–1965 | Succeeded by Arthur Patterson |
| Preceded by John Mogg | Commandant of the Royal Military Academy Sandhurst; 1966–1968 | Succeeded by Philip Tower |
| Preceded by Sir Thomas Pearson | GOC Far East Land Forces; 1968–1970 | Succeeded by Sandy Thomas |
| Preceded by Sir Desmond Fitzpatrick | Commander-in-Chief of the British Army of the Rhine; 1970–1973 | Succeeded by Sir Harry Tuzo |
| Preceded by Sir Michael Carver | Chief of the General Staff; 1973–1976 | Succeeded by Sir Roland Gibbs |
Honorary titles
| Preceded by Sir Geoffrey Baker | Constable of the Tower of London; 1980–1985 | Succeeded by Sir Roland Gibbs |
