= Desmond Fitzpatrick =

British Army general (1912–2002)

General Sir Desmond Fitzpatrick GCB GCVO DSO MBE MC
- Born: 14 December 1912; Aldershot, Hampshire, England
- Died: 12 October 2002 (aged 89); Otley, West Yorkshire, England
- Military career
- Allegiance: United Kingdom
- Branch: British Army
- Service years: 1932–1974
- Rank: General
- Service number: 53670
- Unit: 1st The Royal Dragoons
- Commands: Deputy Supreme Allied Commander, Europe; British Army of the Rhine; Northern Ireland Command; Rhine Army Troops; 1st The Royal Dragoons; 8th King's Royal Irish Hussars
- Conflicts: Arab revolt in Palestine; Second World War
- Awards: Knight Grand Cross of the Order of the Bath; Knight Grand Cross of the Royal Victorian Order; Companion of the Distinguished Service Order; Member of the Order of the British Empire; Military Cross; Mentioned in Despatches
- Other work: Lieutenant Governor of Jersey; Gold Stick

General Sir Geoffrey Richard Desmond Fitzpatrick, GCB, GCVO, DSO, MBE, MC (14 December 1912 – 12 October 2002) was a senior British Army officer who served as commander of the British Army of the Rhine and Deputy Supreme Allied Commander Europe. After his retirement from the army he was appointed Lieutenant Governor of Jersey and later held a ceremonial position in the Royal Household.

== Early life ==
Fitzpatrick was born on 14 December 1912 in Aldershot, the son of Sir Ernest Richard Fitzpatrick, a brigadier general. He attended Eton College and then the Royal Military College Sandhurst, and was commissioned as a second lieutenant in the 1st The Royal Dragoons on 1 September 1932. He was promoted lieutenant three years later. In 1938, his regiment was sent to Palestine to suppress the 1936–39 Arab revolt in Palestine, and on 22 December 1939 Fitzpatrick received the Military Cross for his role in operations there.

== Second World War ==
Fitzpatrick was promoted to captain on 1 September 1940. In 1941, his regiment was dispatched to Syria, with him as adjutant, to join Operation Exporter, the allied invasion of territory controlled by Vichy France in the Middle East. Fitzpatrick's regiment then participated in the Western Desert Campaign, in the reconnaissance role. After the operations there, he attended the British staff college at Haifa, and in June 1942 he became brigade major of the 2nd Armoured Brigade, where he helped to plan the Second Battle of El Alamein. After the battle, by which time he was a temporary major, Fitzpatrick was Mentioned in Despatches on 24 June 1943, and later appointed a Member of the Order of the British Empire (MBE), announced in the London Gazette in October 1943. By now he was an acting lieutenant colonel. The recommendation for the MBE credits his planning for he successful deployment of 2nd Armoured Brigade during the battle, and also comments on his "personal example, often under heavy shell fire" while at the Tactical HQ during the battle itself, from where he passed back valuable information to the higher-level formations which had a material effect on the outcome of the battle.

Fitzpatrick next served as a staff officer with the US First Corps and in a position at the War Office, before rejoining his regiment in the Netherlands in 1944 and taking command of one of its squadrons. In 1945, he took command of the 8th King's Royal Irish Hussars, which served as the reconnaissance regiment of the 7th Armoured Division. While commanding the regiment, Fitzpatrick helped capture the heavily-defended town of Tostedt, personally leading several reconnaissance missions. Fitzpatrick's regiment also liberated the concentration camp at Fallingbostel, freeing 10,000 allied prisoners of war and 12,000 other prisoners. His regiment also liberated the Bergen-Belsen concentration camp. For his leadership during this period, by which time he was a temporary lieutenant colonel, he was appointed a Companion of the Distinguished Service Order on 14 July 1945.

== Post-war career ==
After the war, Fitzpatrick received substantive to promotion to major on 1 July 1946, and held several staff assignments and became an instructor at the Staff College, Camberley. He was promoted brevet lieutenant colonel on 1 July 1951, and then assumed command of the 1st Royal Dragoons in the Suez Canal Zone. He received substantive promotion to lieutenant colonel on 8 October 1952 and to colonel on 31 December 1953 (having held the rank on a temporary basis for a period before that). In 1957, he became the Chief of Staff of the 1st Corps with the rank of temporary brigadier. On 20 February 1959, he was appointed an Aide-de-Camp to the Queen, and later in the year, Lord Mountbatten of Burma selected Fitzpatrick to serve as the first Assistant Chief of the Defence Staff. He took up the post on 29 October 1959, with the temporary rank of major general, and the rank was made substantive on 11 December 1959. In this position, Fitzpatrick became known as a "master tactician in the corridors of power" and distinguished himself as an expert in both the political and military realms, he was appointed Companion of the Order of the Bath in the 1961 Birthday Honours, and relinquished the post on 28 October 1961. As a result of his success, he became Director of Military Operations at the Ministry of Defence in 1962. In that role, he helped prepare the British intelligence estimate for the Cuban Missile Crisis and played an important role in various defence policy debates, including those over the Polaris Missile. He relinquished the post on 14 February 1964.

On 25 March 1964, he became the Chief of Staff of the British Army of the Rhine and General Officer Commanding Rhine Army Troops. Then on 24 April 1965, he was promoted to temporary lieutenant general and became General Officer Commanding-in-Chief Northern Ireland Command, the rank was made substantive on 4 June 1965. He was advanced to Knight Commander of the Order of the Bath in the 1965 Queen's Birthday Honours, by which time, and he had also been appointed honorary colonel of the Royals. He left Northern Ireland on 9 July 1966, and succeeded Geoffrey Baker as Vice Chief of the General Staff on 25 July. Next, on 1 May 1968 he relinquished that post, and on 10 July he was given the local rank of general and appointed to command the British Army of the Rhine and the NATO Northern Army Group, his rank became substantive on 1 October. During his time with the Northern Army Group, Fitzpatrick became well respected among his NATO colleagues "for his intellectual capabilities and for his finesse in dealing with international problems" and acquired a reputation as a soldier with particular skill for diplomacy. He relinquished the colonelcy of the Royals on 29 March 1969 when the regiment was amalgamated into the Blues and Royals, becoming deputy colonel of the new regiment until 9 December 1974. He was appointed ADC (General) on 9 January 1970.

Because of his skill and good reputation, Fitzpatrick appointment as Deputy Supreme Allied Commander Europe (DSACEUR) was announced in April 1970, he took up the post on 1 December 1970, and was promoted to Knight Grand Cross of the Order of the Bath in the 1971 New Year Honours. He was appointed Colonel Commandant of the Royal Armoured Corps on 1 April 1971. He served as DSACEUR until 12 November 1973, and retired from the Army on 26 January 1974.

== Retirement ==
After retiring, Fitzpatrick was appointed to a five-year term Lieutenant Governor of Jersey, beginning in 1974. He was appointed Colonel of the Blues and Royals (Gold Stick) on 17 December 1979 and held the post until 1998. He was appointed Knight Grand Cross of the Royal Victorian Order in the 1997 New Year Honours. He died on 12 October 2002 at the age of 89. There is a memorial plaque to him in the Guards' Chapel, Wellington Barracks, London.

Honorary titles
Preceded by Anthony Hilton Pepys	Colonel of 1st The Royal Dragoons; 1964–1969	Amalgamated to form Blues and Royals
New title Regiment formed by amalgamation	Deputy Colonel of the Blues and Royals; 1969–1979	Post abolished
Preceded by Sir Gerald Templer	Colonel of the Blues and Royals; 1979–1998	Succeeded by Anne, Princess Royal
Honorary titles
Preceded by Richard Anderson	General Officer Commanding the British Army in Northern Ireland; 1965–1966	Succeeded by Ian Harris
Preceded by Sir Geoffrey Baker	Vice Chief of the General Staff; 1966–1968	Succeeded by Sir Victor FitzGeorge-Balfour
Preceded by Sir John Hackett	Commander-in-Chief of the British Army of the Rhine; 1968–1970	Succeeded by Sir Peter Hunt
Government offices
Preceded by Sir John Davis	Lieutenant Governor of Jersey; 1974–1979	Succeeded by Sir Peter Whiteley
