= 17th Gurkha Division =

- Active: 1952–1970
- Country: United Kingdom
- Branch: British Army
- Type: Light infantry
- Role: Anti-tank warfare Artillery observer Close-quarters battle Counterinsurgency; Indirect fire Jungle warfare Mountain warfare Raiding; Reconnaissance
- Size: Division
- Engagements: Malayan Emergency

The 17th Gurkha Division/Overseas Commonwealth Land Forces (Malaya) was a British military formation that saw active service during the Malayan Emergency.

== History ==
The Division was formed by redesignating Headquarters South Malaya District at Maxwell Road Camp, Malaya, on 1 September 1952 as part of the army response to the Malayan Emergency.

It perpetuated the traditions of the former 17th Indian Infantry Division which had used a Black Cat as its emblem.

Headquarters 17th Gurkha Division was the operational headquarters for all British and Gurkha units in Malaya. It controlled the 26th, 48th and 63rd Gurkha Brigades, and 99th Gurkha Brigade which formed about 1952 also came under command. Maxwell Road Camp was renamed Lamjung Camp in 1953.

In 1957, upon the Federation of Malaya gaining independence from British colonial rule, the Division was redesignated as the 17th Gurkha Division/Overseas Commonwealth Land Forces (Malaya).

It was based at Lamjung Camp in Kuala Lumpur until 1966 when it moved to Seremban where it remained until the Division disbanded in 1970.

== General Officers Commanding ==
Commanders included:

- 1952–1955 Major-General Lancelot Perowne
- 1955–1958 Major-General Richard Anderson
- 1958–1961 Major-General Jim Robertson
- 1961–1964 Major-General Walter Walker
- 1964–1965 Major-General Peter Hunt
- 1965–1969 Major-General Arthur Patterson
- 1969–1970 Major-General Derek Horsford

== Bibliography ==
- Pocock, Tom (1973). Fighting General – The Public & Private Campaigns of General Sir Walter Walker (First ed.). London: Collins. ISBN 0-00-211295-7.
