= John Herbert Hardy =

- Born: 18 September 1893
- Died: 3 August 1969 (aged 75); Lancaster, Lancashire, England
- Military career
- Allegiance: United Kingdom
- Branch: British Army
- Service years: 1913−1947
- Rank: Brigadier
- Service number: 5035
- Unit: King's Own Royal Regiment (Lancaster)
- Commands: 2nd Battalion, King's Own Royal Regiment (Lancaster); Libyan Arab Force; Nile Valley Area; Iraqi Levies in ‘Paiforce’ Mersey Sub-District
- Conflicts: World War I World War II
- Awards: Commander of the Order of the British Empire; Military Cross

Brigadier John Herbert Hardy CBE, MC (18 September 1893 – 3 August 1969) was a British Army officer who served as colonel of the King's Own Royal Regiment (Lancaster).

== Military career ==
Hardy was commissioned as a lieutenant in the 3rd (Militia) Battalion of the King's Own Royal Regiment (Lancaster) on 28 November 1913. He served in the First World War and was seconded to the Egyptian Army in 1917.

He served in the Second World War as commanding officer of the 2nd Battalion of the King's Own Royal Regiment (Lancaster) from August 1939, where he took over from Neil Ritchie. His adjutant was Richard Anderson, later a lieutenant general. He was later second in Command of the Island of Cyprus from April 1941 and as commander of the Libyan Arab Force from July 1941. He went on to be commander of the Nile Valley Area in August 1942, commander of the Iraqi Levies in ‘Paiforce’ in October 1942 and commander of the Mersey Defences and Mersey Sub-District in February 1944. He also served as colonel of the King's Own Royal Regiment (Lancaster) (1947–57).

He was appointed a Commander of the Order of the British Empire in the 1946 New Year Honours.

His son was Sir David Hardy, chairman of the London Docklands Development Corporation.

Honorary titles
Preceded by Russell Mortimer Luckock	Colonel of the King's Own Royal Regiment (Lancaster); 1947–1957	Succeeded by Richard Neville Anderson
