= Allied Forces Northern Europe =

Subordinate NATO Command

- Allied Forces Northern Europe Emblem
- Active: 1952–1994
- Part of: Allied Command Europe, Casteau, Belgium
- Location: Kolsås, Norway

Allied Forces Northern Europe (AFNORTH) was the northern Major Subordinate Command of NATO's Allied Command Europe (ACE), located at Kolsås outside Oslo. In the case of war with the Soviet Union, AFNORTH would assume supreme command of all Allied forces in northern Europe (Norway and Denmark) and West Germany north of Elbe/Hamburg and adjacent sea territory.

== History ==
The headquarters was established in Volksenlia Station and the previous "Voksenkollens Hospits" building, in Kolsås. The first Commander-in-Chief, Admiral Sir Patrick Brind, transferred command of AFNORTH to Lieutenant General Sir Robert Mansergh on 1 April 1951. In accordance with naval tradition Admiral Brind's car was "towed by a large group" after the ceremony.

For much of its existence its commander-in-chief (CINCNORTH) was a British Admiral or General. The chief-of-staff was always a West German Vice Admiral. The central Air Force Commander Northern Europe, who would assume command of all NATO air forces in AFNORTH's area in the case of war, was directly subordinated to CINCNORTH and was always a general from the U.S. Air Force. The leadership of AFNORTH additionally included a Land Deputy, a Sea Deputy, and an Air Deputy, who were for a period Danish or Norwegian Major Generals or Rear Admirals.

Headquarters Allied Air Forces Northern Europe was created by SHAPE on 29 March 1951. Major General R.K. Taylor, U.S. Air Force, was assigned as its commander on 2 April 1951. The Headquarters was established in London on 1 June 1951 and later transferred to Oslo, Norway on 22 June 1951. By June 1952 no units had been earmarked or allocated for it. Major General Homer L. Sanders held command September 1954-September 1957. Major General Carl D. Peterson became Air Deputy in June 1977.

Until the formation of BALTAP around 1962, AFNORTH comprised Allied Land Forces Norway, Allied Land Forces Denmark, and Allied Air Forces and Allied Naval Forces, Northern Europe (four commands).

In 1989 at the end of the Cold War AFNORTH's major subordinate commands were Allied Forces North Norway; Allied Forces South Norway; and Allied Forces Baltic Approaches (Karup). BALTAP comprised AIRBALTAP, NAVBALTAP, LANDZEALAND, responsible for the land defence of Zealand and the other Danish islands, and Allied Land Forces Schleswig-Holstein and Jutland (LANDJUT). From 1962 LANDJUT had been responsible for the land defence of the Baltic Approaches from a headquarters at Rendsburg, West Germany. LANDJUT comprised the 6th Panzergrenadier Division and the Danish Jutland Division. LANDJUT was planned to be reinforced in time of war by the United Kingdom Mobile Force, primarily 1st Infantry Brigade and the US Army's 9th Infantry Division. In case of war with the Warsaw Pact AFNORTH would have moved its headquarter to the subterranean command center at Kolsås.

HQ AFNORTH Kolsås closed on the morning of 30 June 1994. The HQ that replaced it, HQ Allied Forces Northwestern Europe (AFNORTHWEST), located at RAF High Wycombe in the United Kingdom, was activated in the afternoon of 30 June 1994. AFNORTHWEST directed three Principal Subordinate Commanders: Commander Allied Air Forces Northwestern Europe (COMAIRNORTHWEST), Commander Allied Naval Forces Northwestern Europe (COMNAVNORTHWEST) (the former EASTLANT/CINCHAN), and Commander Allied Forces Northern Europe (COMNORTH), an amalgamation of Allied Forces North and South Norway. In addition, in various circumstances Baltic Approaches naval forces would report to either CINCNORTHWEST or COMNAVNORTHWEST.

AFCENT, located in Brunssum in the Netherlands, was renamed AFNORTH. AFNORTHWEST was disestablished on 3 March 2000, CINCNORTHWEST transferring his authority to RHQ AFNORTH the same day. In the year 2004, it was again renamed, to Joint Force Command Brunssum.

The headquarters facility at Kolsås is now used by the Norwegian defence logistics organization.

== Structure until 1993 ==
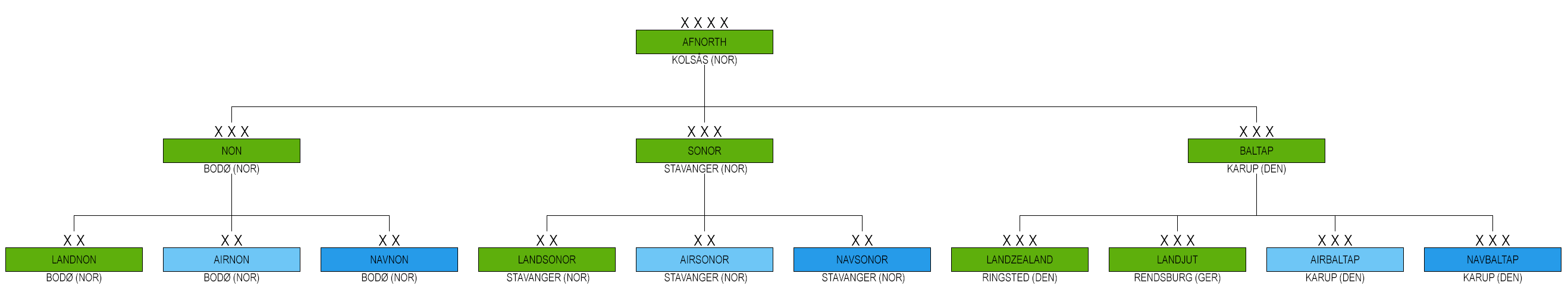
Command structure of AFNORTH in 1989 (click to enlarge)

- Allied Command Europe, in Mons, Belgium
  - Allied Forces Northern Europe (AFNORTH) in Kolsås, Norway
    - US Army Element at Headquarters Allied Forces Northern Europe (AFNORTH), in Kolsås
    - Jåttå Detachment, Region II, 650th Military Intelligence Group (Allied Command Europe (ACE) Counterintelligence Activity), in Stavanger
    - US Air Force Element at Headquarters AFNORTH, in Kolsås
      - 7240th Air Base Squadron, in Østerås
      - Detachment 1, 2176th Communications Squadron, in Kolsås
      - Detachment 3, 1141st USAF Special Activities Squadron, in Kolsås
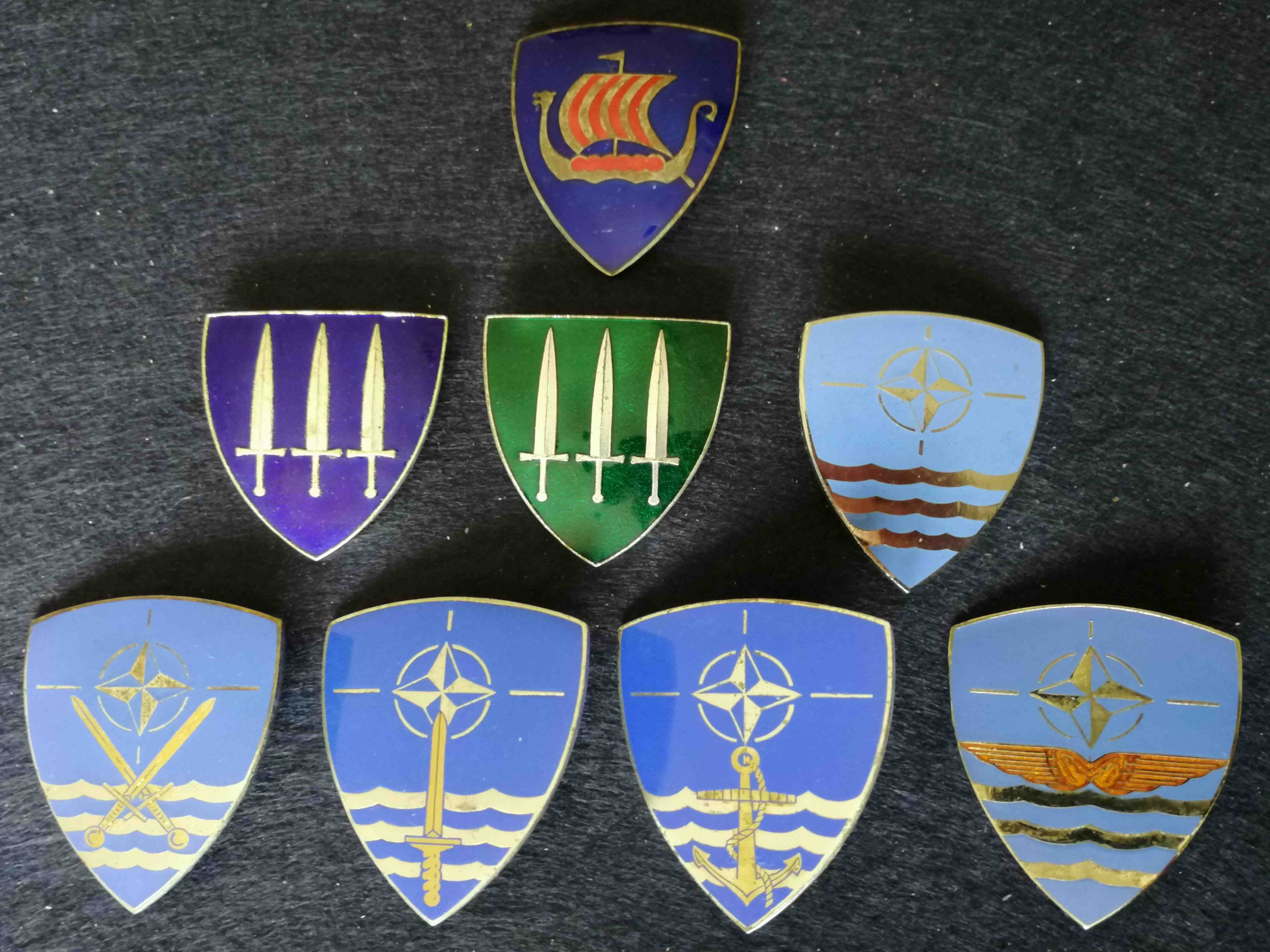
    - AFNORTH command badges in the 1980s
      Other national and service elements at HQ AFNORTH
    - Allied Forces North Norway (NON)^{*} in Bodø, Norway
    - Allied Forces South Norway (SONOR)^{*} in Stavanger, Norway
    - Allied Forces Baltic Approaches (BALTAP) in Karup, Denmark
      - Allied Land Forces Schleswig-Holstein and Jutland (COMLANDJUT), in Rendsburg, Germany
      - Allied Land Forces in Zealand (COMLANDZEALAND) in Ringsted, Denmark
      - Allied Air Forces Baltic Approaches (COMAIRBALTAP) in Karup
      - Allied Naval Forces Baltic Approaches (COMNAVBALTAP) in Karup

* The sub-commands of NON and SONOR were national Norwegian commands.

== Structure 2000–2004 ==
- AFNORTH at this point was a regional command of AFCENT:
  - Two component commands:
    - Allied Air Forces North (AIRNORTH) at Ramstein Air Base, Germany;
    - Allied Naval Forces North (NAVNORTH) at the Northwood Headquarters, London, United Kingdom.
  - Three Joint Sub-regional commands:
    - Joint Command Centre in Heidelberg, Germany;
    - Joint Command North-East in Karup, Denmark;
    - Joint Command North in Stavanger, Norway

The command alternated between British and German generals.

== Commanders-in-Chief ==
Commanders-in-Chief have been:

- 1951–1953 Admiral Sir Patrick Brind
- 1953–1956 General Sir Robert Mansergh
- 1956–1958 Lieutenant General Sir Cecil Sugden
- 1958–1961 Lieutenant General Sir Horatius Murray
- 1961–1963 Lieutenant General Sir Harold Pyman
- 1963–1967 Lieutenant General Sir Robert Bray
- 1967–1969 General Sir Kenneth Darling
- 1969–1972 General Sir Walter Walker
- 1972–1974 General Sir Thomas Pearson
- 1974–1977 General Sir John Sharp
- 1977–1979 General Sir Peter Whiteley
- 1979–1982 General Sir Anthony Farrar-Hockley
- 1982–1986 General Sir Richard Lawson
- 1986–1989 General Sir Geoffrey Howlett
- 1989–1992 General Sir Patrick Palmer
- 1992–1994 General Sir Garry Johnson
