= Robert Bray (British Army officer) =

British Army general (1908–1983)

General Sir Robert Bray GBE KCB DSO*
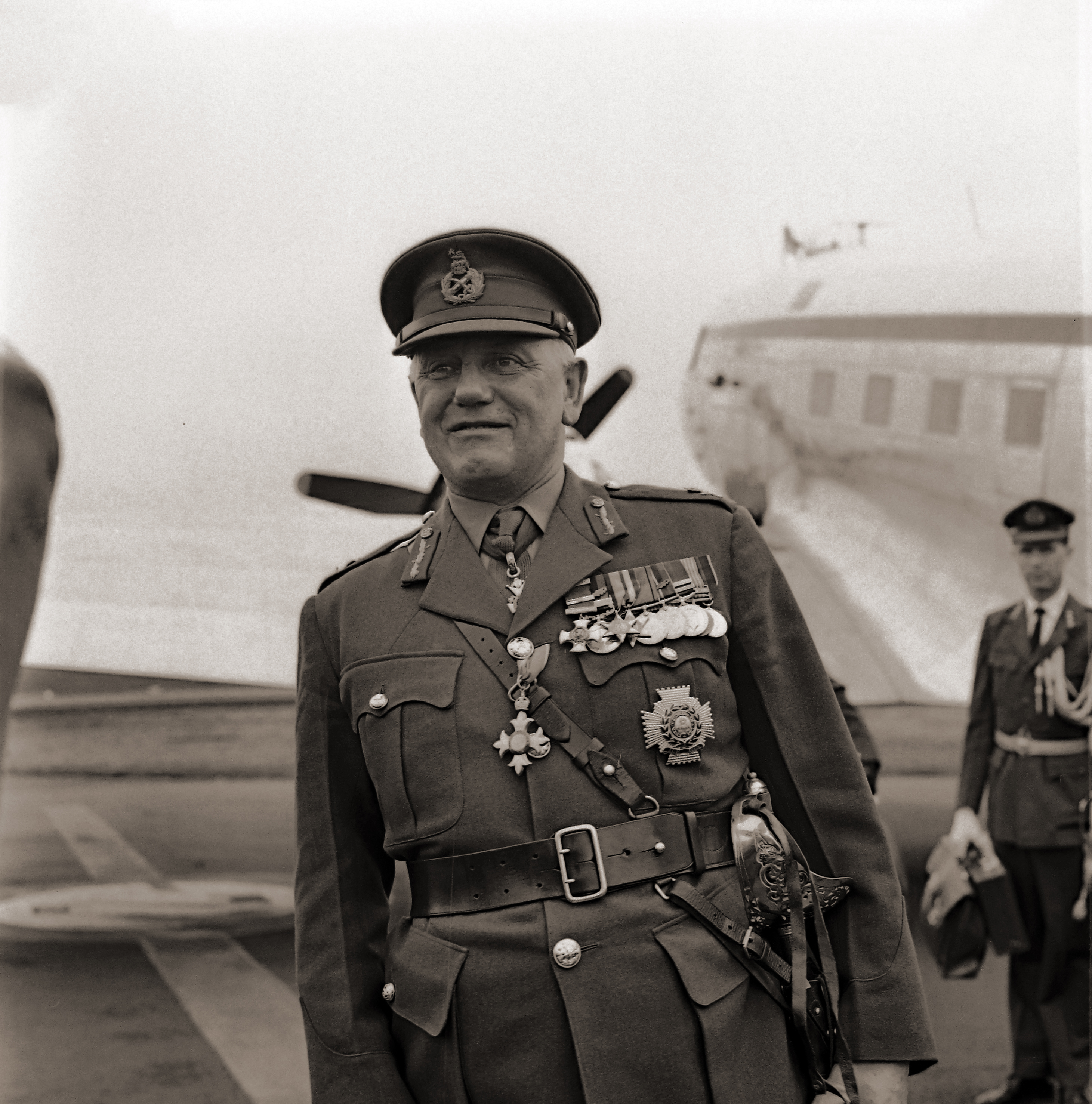
- Lieutenant-General Sir Robert Bray on an inspection on Bornholm, April 1964
- Born: 14 June 1908; Dacca, Bengal Presidency
- Died: 14 August 1983 (aged 75); Warminster, London, England
- Military career
- Allegiance: United Kingdom
- Branch: British Army
- Service years: 1928–1971
- Rank: General
- Nickname: "Bobbie"
- Service number: 39414
- Unit: Duke of Wellington's Regiment
- Commands: 2nd Battalion, Gloucestershire Regiment; 185th Infantry Brigade; 29th Infantry Brigade; 56th (London) Armoured Division; Southern Command; Allied Forces Northern Europe
- Conflicts: World War II
- Awards: Knight Grand Cross of the Order of the British Empire; Knight Commander of the Order of the Bath; Companion of the Distinguished Service Order

General Sir Robert Napier Hubert Campbell Bray GBE KCB DSO* (14 June 1908 – 14 August 1983) was a British Army officer who served as Deputy Supreme Commander Europe of NATO's Allied Command Europe from 1967 to 1970.

== Education ==
Bray was educated at St Ronan's School, Worthing, followed by Gresham's School, Holt, and the Royal Military Academy, Woolwich.

== Career ==
Bray was commissioned as a second lieutenant in the 1st Battalion of the Duke of Wellington's (West Riding) Regiment on 2 February 1928.

He served in North West Europe and the Middle East during the Second World War being promoted to temporary lieutenant colonel on 19 October 1942.

He became a Brigadier on the General Staff at the British Army of the Rhine in 1950 and then Director of Land-Air Warfare and North Atlantic Treaty Organization Standardization at the War Office in December 1954. Promoted to major-general on 29 October 1955, he became General Officer Commanding 56th (London) Armoured Division in April 1957. He then became GOC British Land Forces in the Arabian Peninsula in 1959 and GOC Middle East Land Forces in 1960.

He was promoted to lieutenant-general on 27 February 1961 and served as GOC-in-C at Southern Command from August 1961 to September 1963. He was promoted to full general on 25 February 1965. He was the colonel-in-chief of the Duke of Wellington's Regiment from 1965 to 1975. He served as Commander-in-Chief Allied Forces Northern Europe between November 1963 and February 1967 and as Deputy Supreme Commander Europe at NATO's Allied Command between May 1967 and December 1970, succeeding Marshal of the Royal Air Force Sir Thomas Pike. He retired on 9 March 1971.

== Honours ==
- 1944 – Companion of the Distinguished Service Order (DSO) for gallant and distinguished services in Normandy
- 1945 – Bar to Companion of the Distinguished Service Order insignia for gallant and distinguished services in north west Europe
- 1952 – Commander of the Order of the British Empire (CBE)
- 1956 – Companion of the Order of the Bath (CB)
- 1962 – Knight Commander of the Order of the Bath (KCB)
- 1966 – Knight Grand Cross of the Order of the British Empire (GBE)
- Colonel of the Duke of Wellington's Regiment, October 1965 to July 1975
- Mentioned in Despatches North West Frontier 1935
- Mentioned in Despatches 20 December 1940

== Bibliography ==
- I Will Plant Me a Tree by Steve Benson and Martin Crossley Evans (James & James, London, 2002) ISBN 0-907383-92-0

Military offices
Preceded by David Dawnay	GOC 56th (London) Armoured Division; 1954–1959	Succeeded by Peter Deakin
Preceded by Sir Nigel Poett	GOC-in-C Southern Command; 1961–1963	Succeeded by Sir Kenneth Darling
Preceded by Sir Harold Pyman	Commander-in-Chief of Allied Forces Northern Europe; 1963–1967	Succeeded by Sir Kenneth Darling
Preceded by Sir Thomas Pike	Deputy Supreme Allied Commander Europe; 1967–1970	Succeeded by Desmond Fitzpatrick
