= Roger Mortimer =

Roger Mortimer (or Roger de Mortimer) is the name of:

- Roger of Mortemer (fl. 1054 – after 1078)
- Roger Mortimer of Wigmore (before 1153 – before 8 July 1214), medieval marcher lord
- Roger Mortimer, 1st Baron Mortimer of Wigmore (1231–1282), a marcher lord
- Roger Mortimer, 1st Baron Mortimer of Chirk (c. 1256 – 1326), a marcher lord
- Roger Mortimer, 1st Earl of March (1287–1330), English nobleman
- Roger Mortimer, 2nd Earl of March (1328–1360), military commander during the Hundred Years' War
- Roger Mortimer, 4th Earl of March (1374–1398), heir presumptive to Richard II of England from 1385
- Roger Mortimer (racing) (1909–1991), English horse-racing correspondent
