= 3rd (Royal Northumberland Fusiliers) Reconnaissance Regiment =

8th Battalion, Royal Northumberland Fusiliers 3rd Battalion, Reconnaissance Corps 3rd Regiment, Reconnaissance Corps (NF) 3rd Reconnaissance Regiment (NF)
- Insignia of the 3rd Infantry Division.
- Active: 18 June 1939–July 1946
- Country: United Kingdom
- Branch: British Army
- Type: Reconnaissance
- Size: Battalion/Regiment
- Part of: 23rd (Northumbrian) Division; 3rd Infantry Division
- Engagements: Second World War North-West Europe 1940 North-West Europe 1944–45

Commanders
- Notable commanders: Eric Bols

The 3rd Reconnaissance Regiment (NF) was a regiment of the Reconnaissance Corps, which was itself part of the Royal Armoured Corps, raised by the British Army during the Second World War.

It was originally raised as the 8th Battalion, Royal Northumberland Fusiliers, formed as a 2nd Line Territorial Army duplicate unit of the 4th Battalion, just before the outbreak of the Second World War as a motorcycle battalion and served as such in the Battle of France in May 1940. It was converted to a reconnaissance unit in April 1941 and fought in North-West Europe from June 1944 until May 1945 when the war in Europe ended.

In July 1946, over a year since the end of the war in Europe, the regiment was placed in suspended animation, formally reconstituted on 1 January 1947 and immediately disbanded.

== History ==
=== Formation ===
By 1939 it became clear that a new European war was likely to break out and, as a direct result of the German invasion of Czechoslovakia on 15 March, the doubling of the Territorial Army (TA) was authorised, with each unit and formation forming a duplicate. Consequently, the 8th Battalion, Royal Northumberland Fusiliers was formed as a duplicate of the 4th Battalion on 18 June 1939 (Note: The first officer was commissioned on 18 June 1939.) organized as a motorcycle battalion. (Note: The battalion should not be confused with the 8th (Service) Battalion, Northumberland Fusiliers which was a Kitchener's Army unit in the First World War. It was formed at Newcastle upon Tyne on 19 August 1914. as part of Lord Kitchener's First New Army – K1 – and was assigned to the 34th Brigade, 11th (Northern) Division at Grantham. In July 1915 it departed for the Mediterranean and landed at Gallipoli on 7 August. In January 1916 it moved to Egypt where it formed part of the Suez Canal Defences, and in July to the Western Front where it spent the rest of the war (still in 34th Brigade, 11th Division). It was disbanded on 27 June 1919 at Newcastle.)

=== Second World War ===
On 2 October 1939, the battalion was assigned to the 23rd (Northumbrian) Division. (Note: Between 3 September and 2 October 1939, the units of the 23rd Division were administered by the 50th (Northumbrian) Infantry Division.) The division was sent to France on 22 April 1940, on labour and training duties, without any of its artillery or the bulk of its signals and administration units. On 20 May 1940, the division suffered heavy casualties trying to delay the German advance at Arras and had to be evacuated at Dunkirk. On its return to the United Kingdom the 23rd Division was disbanded due to the heavy losses it had suffered and the two infantry brigades were sent to other divisions.

After Dunkirk, the battalion left the 23rd Division on 29 June 1940. It was under command of Home Forces until November 1940 when it joined the 3rd Infantry Division, a Regular Army formation, as a motorcycle battalion. The battalion was one of only two Territorial Army units in the division, the other being 76th (Highland) Field Regiment, Royal Artillery. On 30 April 1941 it was transferred to the Reconnaissance Corps and redesignated as 3rd Battalion, Reconnaissance Corps; then on 6 June 1942 as 3rd Regiment, Reconnaissance Corps (NF); and finally on 1 January 1944 it was transferred to the Royal Armoured Corps as 3rd Reconnaissance Regiment (NF). It remained part of the 3rd Infantry Division until August 1945.

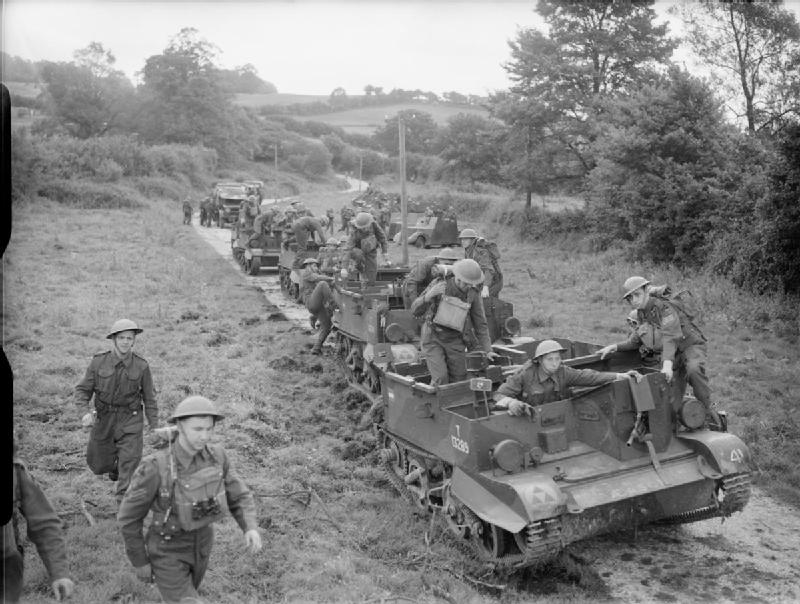
Men of the 3rd Battalion, Reconnaissance Corps 'de-bus' from their Universal Carriers at Sturminster Newton in Dorset, 28 August 1941.

The 3rd Infantry Division remained in the United Kingdom, training for many years until it landed on Sword Beach on 6 June 1944 – D-Day – and fought through the Battle of Normandy (Caen, Bourguébus Ridge, Mont Pinçon), the Netherlands (The Nederrijn) and later the invasion of Germany the (Rhineland and the Rhine), ending the war in Bremen. By the end of the war the 3rd Reconnaissance Regiment had lost 90 officers and other ranks killed in action.

=== Post-war ===
The regiment was placed in suspended animation in July 1946. (Note: "Suspended animation" means that the unit continues to exist but without any personnel or equipment assigned.)

The Territorial Army was disbanded at the end of the Second World War but this was a formality. TA units were reactivated on 1 January 1947, though no personnel were assigned until commanding officers and permanent staff had been appointed in March and April 1947.

The 3rd Reconnaissance Regiment was reconstituted on 1 January 1947, converted to infantry with its former title (8th Battalion) and immediately disbanded.

== Bibliography ==
- Beckett, Ian F.W. (2008). Territorials: A Century of Service. Plymouth: DRA Publishing. ISBN 978-0-9557813-1-5.
- Bellis, Malcolm A. (1994). Regiments of the British Army 1939–1945 (Armour & Infantry). London: Military Press International. ISBN 0-85420-999-9.
- Delaforce, Patrick (1995). Monty's Iron Sides. Stroud: Alan Sutton. ISBN 0-7509-0781-9.
- Forty, George (1998). British Army Handbook 1939–1945. Stroud, Gloucestershire: Sutton Publishing Limited. ISBN 0-7509-1403-3.
- Frederick, J.B.M. (1984). Lineage Book of British Land Forces 1660–1978. Wakefield, Yorkshire: Microform Academic Publishers. ISBN 1-85117-009-X.
- James, Brigadier E.A. (1978). British Regiments 1914–18. London: Samson Books Limited. ISBN 0-906304-03-2.
- Joslen, Lt-Col H.F. (1990) [1st. Pub. HMSO:1960]. Orders of Battle, Second World War, 1939–1945. London: London Stamp Exchange. ISBN 0-948130-03-2.
- Westlake, Ray (1986). The Territorial Battalions, A Pictorial History, 1859–1985. Tunbridge Wells: Spellmount.
