= Kolsås =

- Village
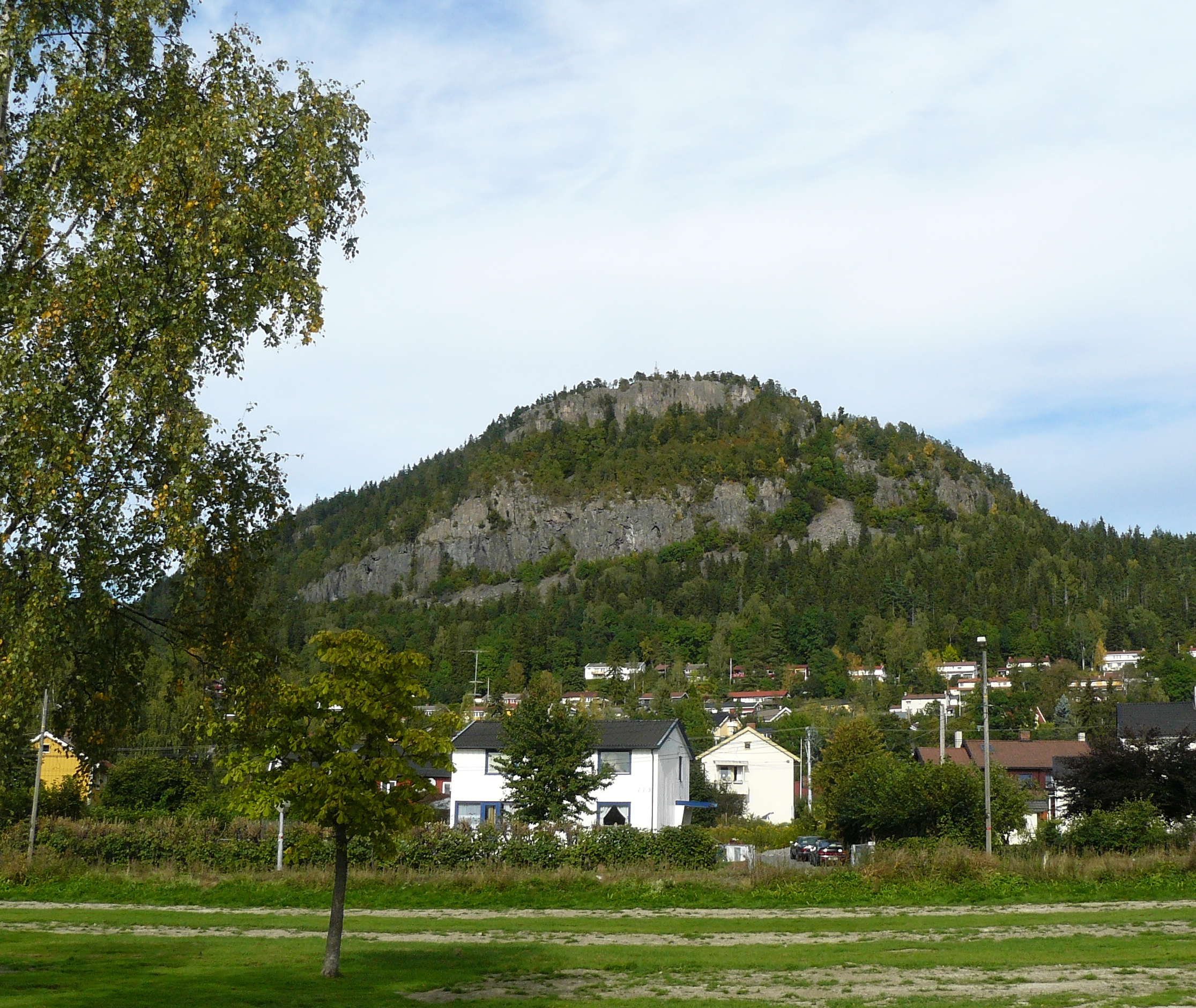
- Kolsås ridge

- Location in Akershus
- Coordinates: 59°56′N 10°31′E
- Country: Norway
- Region: Østlandet
- County: Akershus
- Municipality: Bærum
- Time zone: UTC+01:00 (CET)
  - Summer (DST): UTC+02:00 (CEST)

Kolsås (Norwegian pronunciation: [ˈkôɫsoːs]), sometimes called Kolsaas, is a hill in the municipality of Bærum, Norway. Geologically, Kolsås belongs to the Oslo Graben area. Its two peaks consist of hard rhomb porphyric lava covering softer rocks, forming steep cliffs to the east, south and west.

== The name ==
An old farm beneath the mountain has the name Kolsberg. The first element in this name is the genitive case of the old male name Kolr, and the last element is berg n 'mountain'. The parish and municipality of Bærum (Old Norse Bergheimr) is probably named after this prominent mountain. The last element in the name of the mountain was later changed to ås m 'mountain ridge' to distinguish it from the name of the farm.

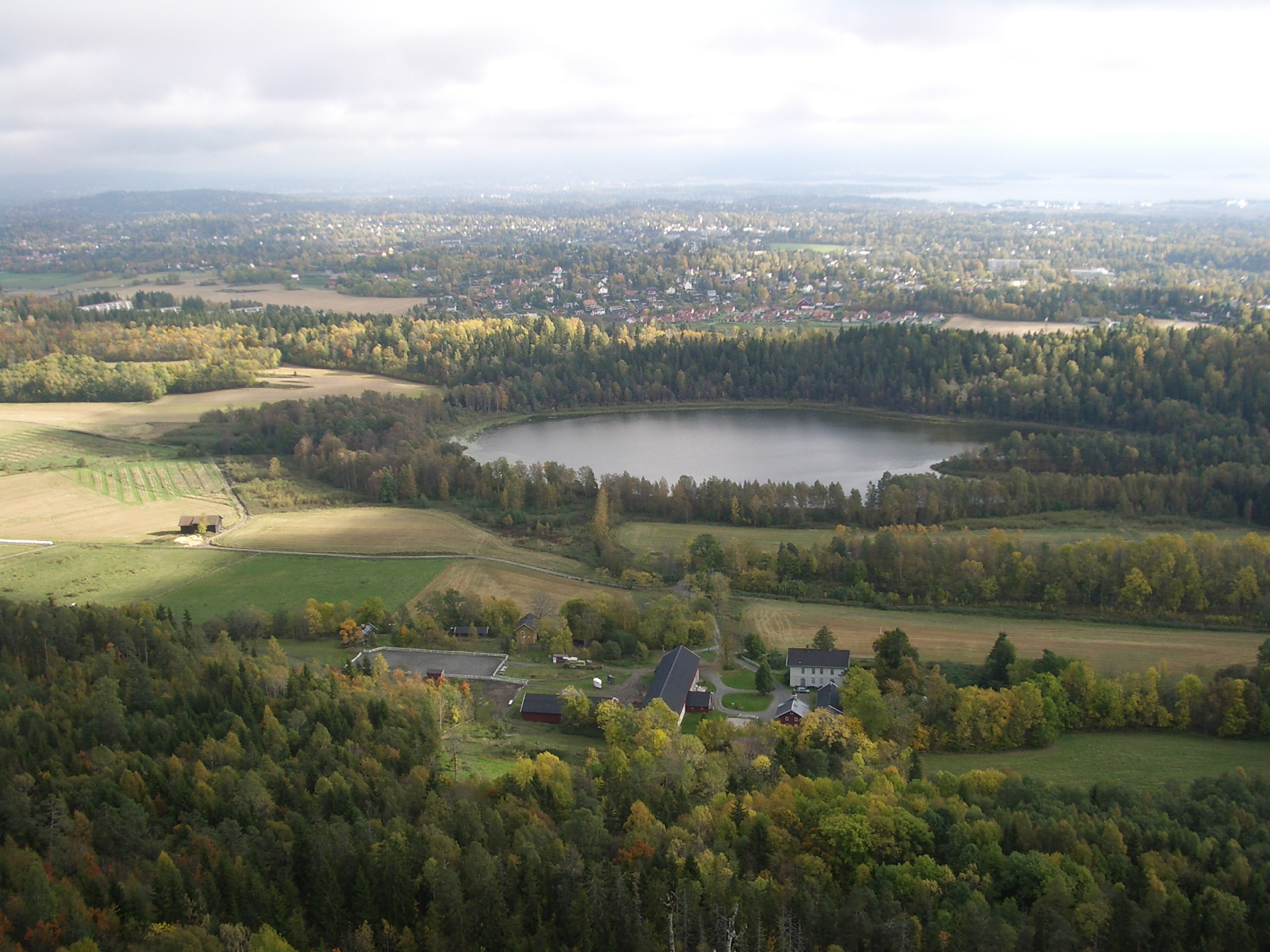
Dælivannet seen from Kolsås

== Protected landscape area ==
The area from Kolsås to Dælivannet is a protected landscape area from 1978 (five square kilometers), with four nature reserves: Skotta, Dalbo, Kolsåsstupene and Kolsåstoppen nature reserve.

== Climbing ==
Kolsås has been a training area for climbers since beginning of the 20th century. Today it is the largest rock climbing area in the Oslo region. The wall Øvre Sydstup on the southern wall has more than 200 climbing routes.

== Winter sports ==
The northern hillside of Kolsås has alpine skiing facilities.

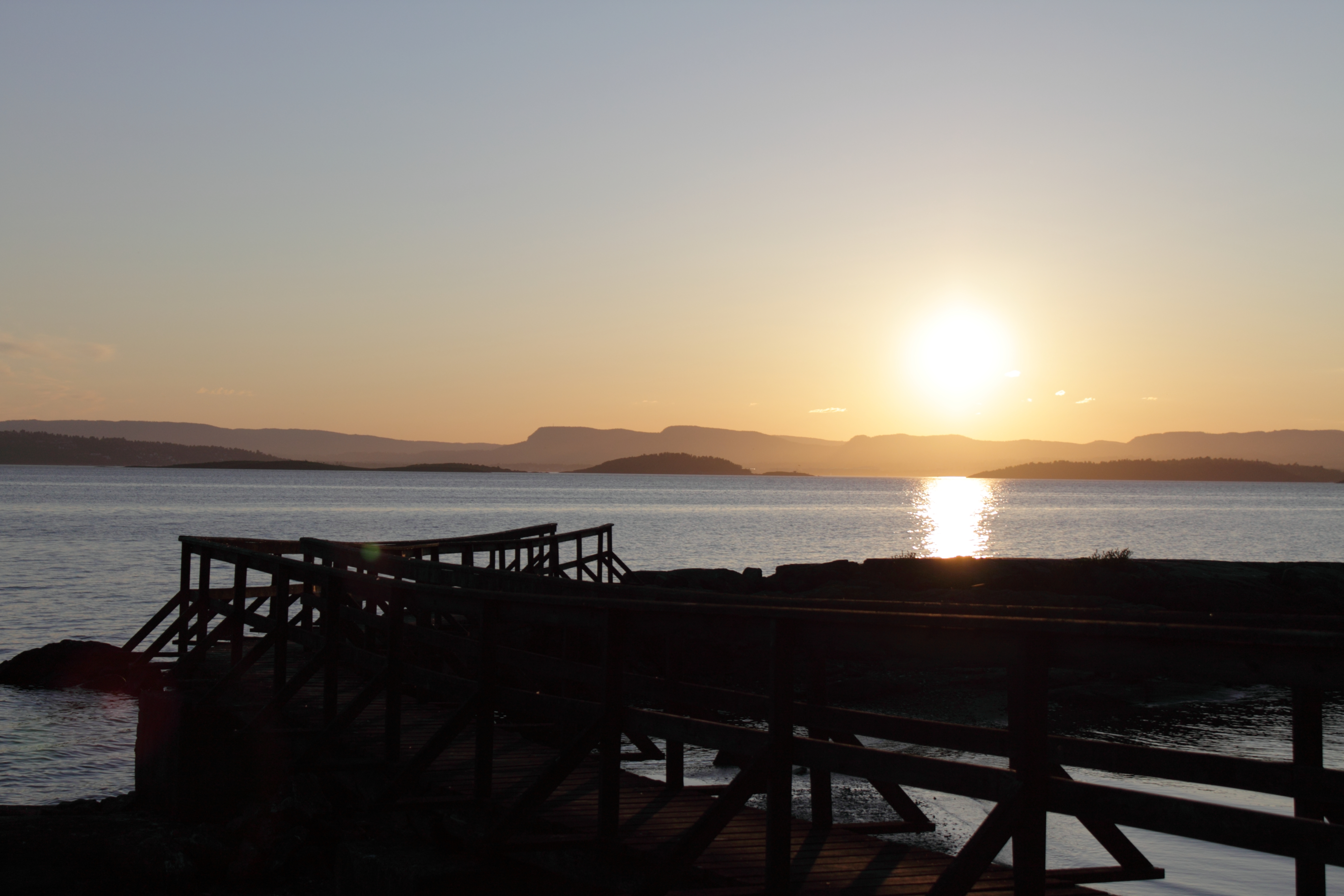
Kolsås protruding in the landscape

== Kolsåsbanen ==
Kolsåsbanen is part of the subway rail system Oslo T-bane, running from downtown Oslo to Kolsås station, via Gjettum station and Hauger station.

== NATO base ==
The military base Kolsås leir, partly located inside the mountain, was home of NATO's Allied Forces Northern Europe (AFNORTH) until 1994.

== Culture ==
The area has occurrences of old petroglyphs, tumuli and limestone quarries.

The French painter Claude Monet painted Mount Kolsaas several times in 1895.
