= Eric Bols =

British Army general (1904–1985)

Major-General Eric Bols CB DSO*
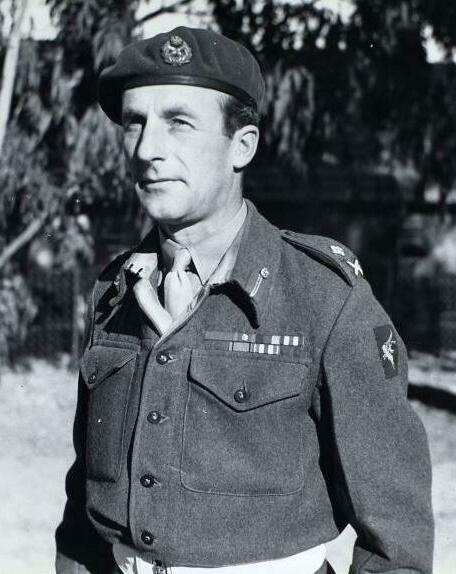
- Bols, c.1945
- Born: 8 June 1904; Camberley, Surrey, England
- Died: 14 June 1985 (aged 81); Battle, East Sussex, England
- Relatives: Lieutenant General Sir Louis Bols (father)
- Military career
- Allegiance: United Kingdom
- Branch: British Army
- Service years: 1924–1948
- Rank: Major-General
- Service number: 28047
- Units: Devonshire Regiment; King's Regiment (Liverpool)
- Commands: 6th Airborne Division; 185th Infantry Brigade; 3rd Reconnaissance Regiment
- Conflicts: Second World War; Palestine Emergency
- Awards: Companion of the Order of the Bath; Distinguished Service Order & Bar; Silver Star (United States)

Major-General Eric Louis Bols, CB, DSO & Bar (8 June 1904 – 14 June 1985) was a senior British Army officer who, during the Second World War, was most notable for serving as the General Officer Commanding the 6th Airborne Division during the final years of the war.

Born in Surrey in 1904, the son of Louis Bols, he was educated at Lancing College and the Royal Military College, Sandhurst. Bols joined the British Army in 1924 and saw service in a number of areas of the British Empire during the interwar period, including Hong Kong and Shanghai, as well as Malta. He served as a Cadet Instructor at the Royal Military College, Sandhurst and attended courses at the Staff College, Camberley on promotion to captain.

When the Second World War began in September 1939, Bols moved through several staff officer positions, serving in several institutions and Army formations before being promoted to colonel and taking charge of all training for the troops under the command of 21st Army Group and helping to plan Operation Overlord, the Allied invasion of Normandy. Bols was then promoted again and commanded the 185th Infantry Brigade during the Allied advance through Western Europe, before taking over command of the 6th Airborne Division from Major General Richard Gale in late 1944. He led the division in the Battle of the Bulge, as well as Operation Varsity, the airborne operation to cross the River Rhine, then led the division into northern Germany until the end of the conflict. Canadian paratroopers captured the town of Wismar in the late days of the war, in order to stop the Soviet army from invading Denmark. Bols was the officer who met face-to-face with the Soviets in Wismar, insisting on allied hold of the captured city, contrary to Yalta conference agreements. He effected a temporary Soviet halt. In the meantime, Lübeck and Hamburg could surrender to allied troops, and finally Denmark was liberated by the allies under the command of Field Marshal Sir Bernard Montgomery. After the end of the war Bols remained in command of the division in peace-keeping duties in the Middle East, and then retired in 1948 as a major general.

== Early life ==
Eric Bols was born in Camberley, Surrey, on 8 June 1904. His father, Louis Jean Bols, was born in Cape Town, South Africa, and was the son of the Belgian Consul stationed in Quebec and later London, Louis Michel Guillaume Joseph Bols. Louis Bols, who was a dual British and Belgian national, travelled around the world and mastered some foreign languages, before eventually meeting his wife and settling down. He served as an officer in the British Army during the First World War, acting as the chief of staff for General Sir Edmund Allenby for the majority of the conflict. Eric Bols was born when his father was attending the Staff College, Camberley, and was educated in several institutions.

== Early military career ==
"I liked him a lot. He was very good with the young chaps and was popular[...]He had the ability to get on well with people who were a couple of decades younger than himself. He was very proud of the Grenadier Guards and made people look up and not down, but with no personal arrogance."

— Bols as a cadet at Sandhurst on Lieutenant-General Sir Frederick "Boy" Browning, then adjutant at Sandhurst.

After attending the Royal Military College at Sandhurst he was commissioned as a second lieutenant in the Devonshire Regiment, his father's regiment, on 30 January 1924. Robert King and Cecil Firbank were among his graduates, both also future major-generals. Bols was promoted to lieutenant on 31 January 1926, and in 1927, Bols was sent with the 1st Battalion, Devonshire Regiment, to China, first being stationed in Hong Kong but later moving to Shanghai, his battalion being tasked with helping to keep the peace in the region. However, he did not stay for very long in China, with his early career being marked by a series of rapid transfers from region to region, and by 1928 he was stationed in Malta, where he found himself playing polo with then-Lord Louis Mountbatten of the Royal Navy, who was also stationed on the island at the same time. From here his career progressed rapidly, appointed an instructor at the Signals School at Catterick Garrison from 27 June 1928 to 29 December 1931 and then becoming an officer of a company of gentlemen cadets at Sandhurst from 6 May 1934 to 21 January 1935 and then to study at the Staff College, Camberley. He was also promoted to captain from that date, transferring to the King's Regiment (Liverpool), there being no vacancies in the Devonshires.

Bols returned to regimental duty for a few months from 22 December 1936, having completed the staff course. On 30 August 1937 he was seconded to the staff of the Ceylon Defence Force with the local rank of major.

== Second World War ==
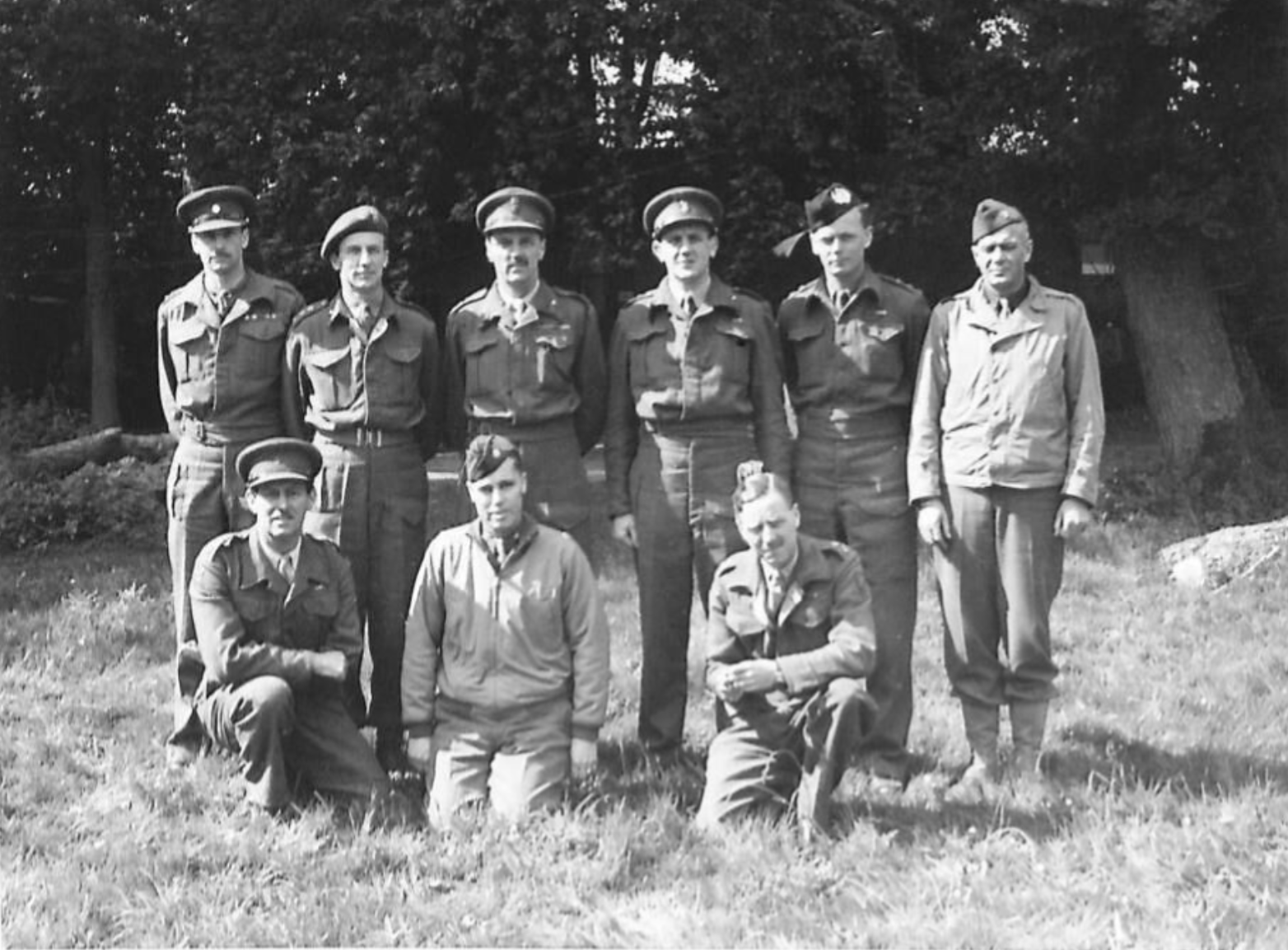
Staff officers of the 21st Army Group, June 1944. Colonel Eric Bols, wearing beret, is stood second from the left in the back row.

When the Second World War began in September 1939, Bols was still in Ceylon (Sri Lanka). His temporary rank of major was made substantive from 25 February 1940 (although he did not immediately receive the pay and allowances for the rank). He went on to act as an instructor at the Staff College, Camberley, a General Staff Officer (GSO) with the 51st (Highland) Infantry Division, then commanded the 3rd Reconnaissance Regiment and acted as the colonel in charge of training for the Anglo-Canadian 21st Army Group. Bols was also involved in planning for Operation Overlord as well as helping to train the soldiers who would participate in the invasion of Normandy, then scheduled for the spring of 1944.

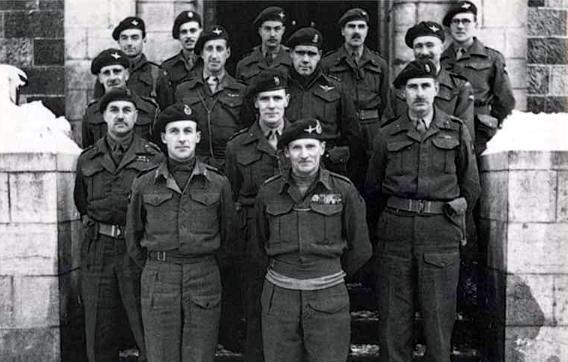
Senior officers of the 6th Airborne Division with Field Marshal Montgomery (front row, centre) in the Ardennes, January 1945. Stood to Montgomery's right is Major General Bols.

When the invasion began on 6 June 1944 Bols did not participate directly, being retained at the War Office in London as a staff officer, but, in early July, he was given command of the 185th Infantry Brigade, with the acting rank of brigadier on the same date. The 185th was one of three brigades which formed part of the 3rd Infantry Division under Major General Lashmer "Bolo" Whistler, and was serving in France after having been one of the first Allied formations to land in the country on the day of the invasion almost a month before. He led the brigade during the final stages of the Battle for Caen, where it saw heavy fighting in Operation Charnwood, Operation Goodwood, and Operation Bluecoat and later in the Allied advance from Paris to the Rhine. He was appointed a Companion of the Distinguished Service Order (DSO) for his command of the brigade during the Battle of Overloon and the subsequent liberation of Overloon and Venray in the Netherlands; the recommendation for the award of the DSO makes particular mention of the achievement of the brigade in forcing the River Breek despite heavy resistance, poor weather and shortage of assault equipment. The award was gazetted on 1 March 1945.

Not long afterwards, Bols was unexpectedly offered the command of the 6th Airborne Division by Field Marshal Sir Bernard Montgomery, commander of the 21st Army Group on the Western Front. Surprised by the news, he later claimed that, "I nearly fell backwards." Prior to this, Bols had not previously commanded a military formation as large as a division. Bols took command shortly before Christmas of 1944, superseding the previous General Officer Commanding (GOC), Major General Richard Gale, who had raised the division in May 1943 and commanded it during Operation Tonga, the British airborne landings in Normandy some six months earlier. He was granted the acting rank of major-general from 6 December 1944. The division was composed of the 3rd Parachute Brigade, under Brigadier James Hill, the 5th Parachute Brigade, under Brigadier Nigel Poett, and the 6th Airlanding Brigade, under Brigadier Edwin Flavell (although he was soon replaced by Brigadier Hugh Bellamy), along with various other supporting units. When Bols took command the division was back in the United Kingdom, expecting a quiet Christmas training and reorganising after being withdrawn from Normandy, where it had suffered heavy casualties, in September. However, with the situation in the Ardennes deteriorating the division was instead sent to Belgium and thrown into the Battle of the Bulge, the largest battle fought on the Western Front during the Second World War, to support American forces in repelling the German counter-offensive between December 1944 and January 1945, one of only a small number of British formations to be engaged in the predominantly-American battle. The 6th Airborne Division conducted a counter-attack, beginning on 3 January alongside other British units, advancing against fierce German resistance until the division linked up with elements of Lieutenant General George S. Patton's U.S. Third Army.

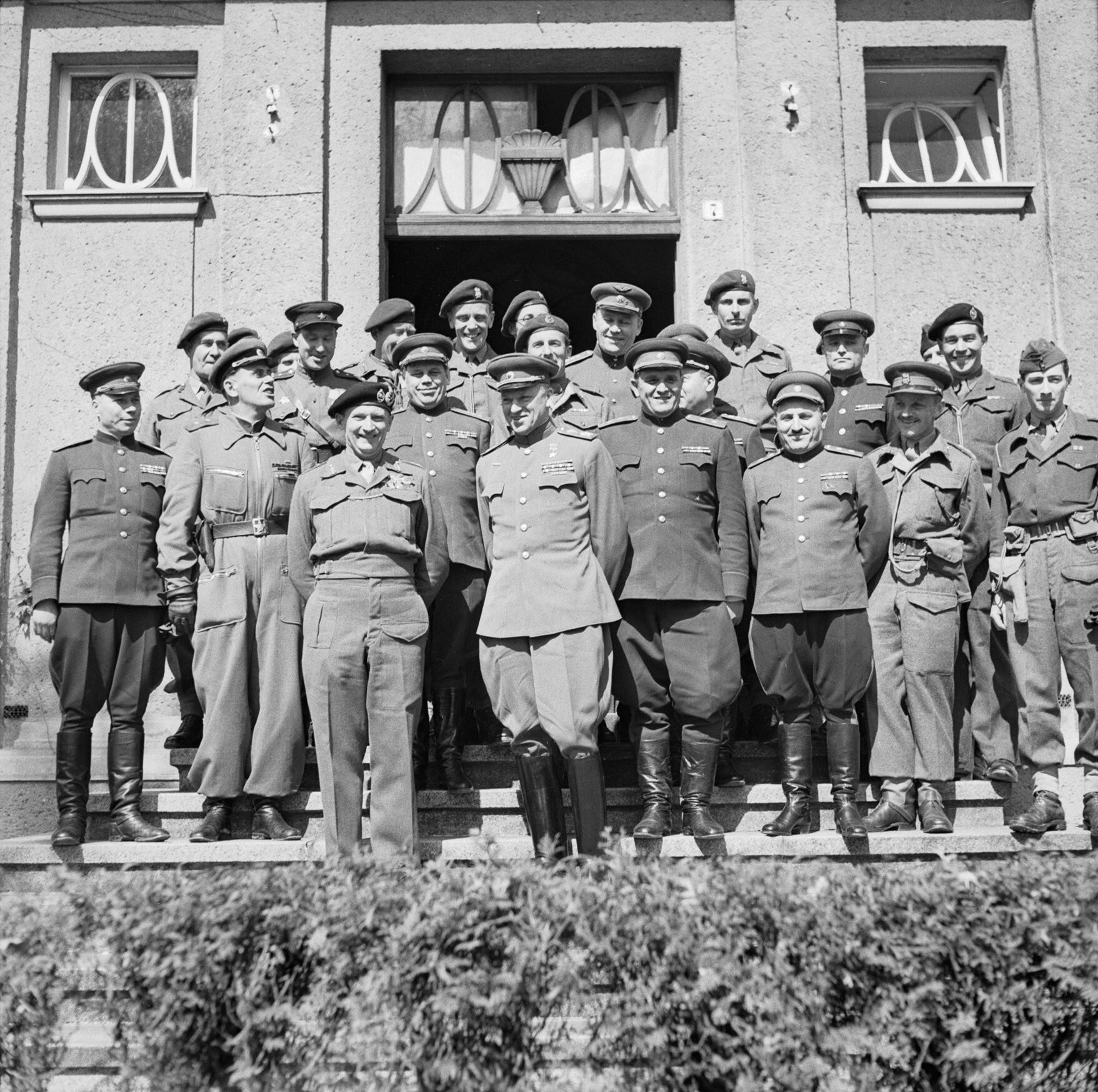
The Russian Marshal Konstantin Rokossovsky with Field Marshal Sir Bernard Montgomery, both in the front row, and their respective Chiefs of Staff at the 6th Airborne Division HQ at Wismar, April/May 1945. Major-General Bols is stood directly behind Rokkosovsky.

The division was not engaged in heavy fighting and was withdrawn back to England towards the end of February to prepare for its next mission. Bols then commanded the division as it participated in Operation Varsity, the Allied airborne assault over the Rhine, which the Allied armies has by now reached and were preparing to cross. Serving alongside the 6th Airborne Division was the U.S. 17th Airborne Division, commanded by Major General William M. Miley, both of which were serving under the command of Major General Matthew Ridgway's U.S. XVIII Airborne Corps. Bols landed with the divisional glider troops in the initial phases of the operation and commanded from the front, for which he received both a Bar to his DSO and the American Silver Star (upon the recommendation of Ridgway, the corps commander) as a result. Despite both divisions sustaining heavy casualties, Ridgway wrote about the operation, stating that:

The impact of the airborne divisions at one blow shattered hostile defence and permitted the prompt link-up with ground troops. The increased bridgehead materially assisted the build-up essential for ultimate success.

After the division had crossed the Rhine, it then advanced through the North German Plain until it linked up with Russian forces at Wismar on the Baltic on 2 May, the first British unit to do so, most of the 350-odd mile advance being made by the airborne troops largely on foot. The end of the Second World War in Europe followed just days later. On 5 July 1945 Bols was appointed a Companion of the Order of the Bath (CB).

== After the war ==
At the end of the war Bols retained the temporary rank of major-general (and his war substantive rank was increased to colonel) and with it command of the 6th Airborne Division. On 21 September 1945 he traveled to Egypt with his HQ staff, arriving shortly after at his final destination, Tel Aviv. The rest of the division followed. He commanded the division whilst it conducted peace-keeping duties in Palestine during the Palestine Emergency. He returned to England, where he attended the Imperial Defence College the following year, before returning to his division in December 1946, succeeding Major General James Cassels who had been in command in Bols's absence.

After almost three years service in the Middle East, Bols retired from the British Army with the honorary rank of major-general (his actual regimental rank was still that of lieutenant colonel) on 8 January 1948.

== Later life ==
In 1965, it was reported by The Times that the former Russian General and then Soviet Deputy Defence Minister Konstantin Rokossovsky argued in a journal article that Bols had attempted to use the 6th Airborne Division to 'infiltrate' Russian lines. Rokossovsky claimed that the division had manoeuvered behind Soviet troops advancing towards Lübeck, and Russian troops had only avoided opening fire on the airborne troops when they had recognized the British uniforms they wore.

Bols died at his home at Peppering Eye, near Battle in East Sussex on 14 June 1985 at the age of 81.

== Bibliography ==
- Dover, Major Victor (1981). The Sky Generals. Cassell. ISBN 0-304-30480-8.
- Saunders, Hilary St. George (1950). The Red Beret: The Story of the Parachute Regiment 1940–1945. Michael Joseph Ltd.
- Smart, Nick (2005). Biographical Dictionary of British Generals of the Second World War. Barnsley, South Yorkshire: Pen and Sword Books. ISBN 1844150496.

Military offices
| Preceded by Richard Gale | GOC 6th Airborne Division; 1944–1946 | Succeeded by James Cassels |
| Preceded by James Cassels | GOC 6th Airborne Division; 1946–1947 | Succeeded by Hugh Stockwell |
