= Kenneth Darling =

British Army general (1909–1998)

General Sir Kenneth Darling GBE KCB DSO
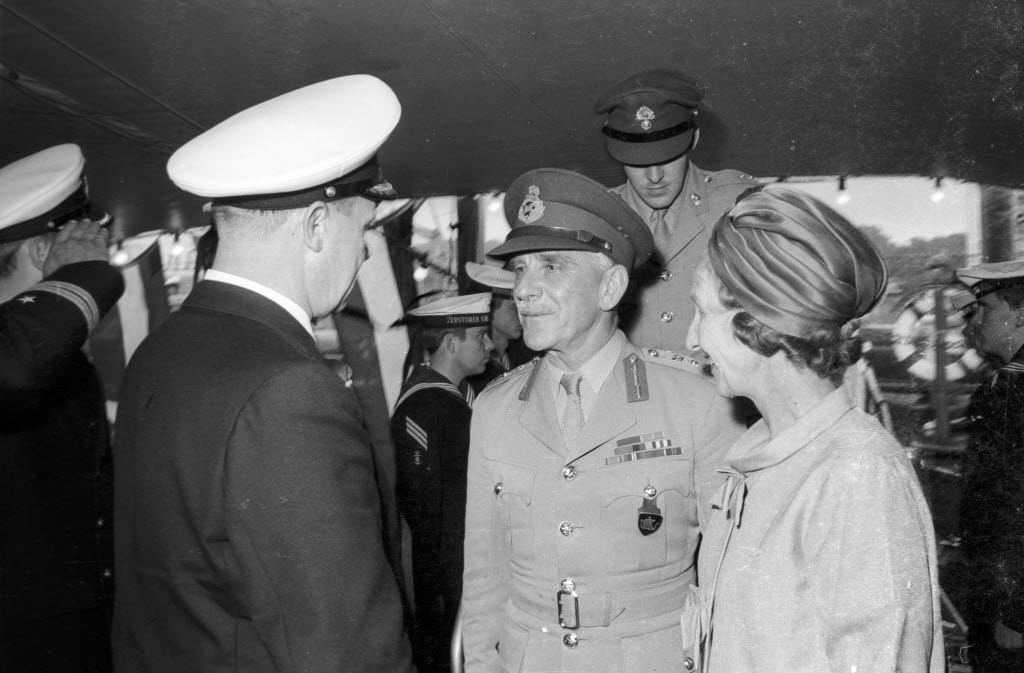
- General Sir Kenneth Darling (centre) in 1968.
- Born: 17 September 1909; Bengal Presidency, British India
- Died: 31 October 1998 (aged 89); Chesterton, Oxfordshire, England
- Relatives: Douglas Darling (brother)
- Military career
- Allegiance: United Kingdom
- Branch: British Army
- Service years: 1929–1969
- Rank: General
- Service number: 44052
- Units: Royal Fusiliers; Parachute Regiment
- Commands: 11th Battalion, Royal Fusiliers; 12th (Yorkshire) Parachute Battalion; 5th Parachute Brigade; 16th Parachute Brigade; II Corps; 1st (British) Corps; Southern Command; Allied Forces Northern Europe
- Conflicts: World War II; Palestine Emergency; Cyprus Emergency
- Awards: Knight Grand Cross of the Order of the British Empire; Knight Commander of the Order of the Bath; Companion of the Distinguished Service Order

General Sir Kenneth Thomas Darling, GBE, KCB, DSO (17 September 1909 – 31 October 1998) was a senior British Army officer who after serving with distinction during the Second World War was commander-in-chief (C-in-C) of Allied Forces Northern Europe 1967–69.

== Early life ==
Darling was born in British India, the eldest son of George Kenneth Darling (1879–1964) of the Indian Civil Service and his wife Mabel Eleanor, née Burgess (d. 1952). His younger brother, the future Major General Douglas Darling (1914–1978), was also to become a distinguished soldier.

== Military career ==
Upon being sent to England, Kenneth Darling was educated at Eton College and the Royal Military College, Sandhurst, where he was commissioned as a second lieutenant into the Royal Fusiliers on 29 August 1929. He served with the 2nd Battalion of his regiment, in the United Kingdom, before serving with the 1st Battalion in India for eight years, from 1930 to 1938. He was promoted to lieutenant on 29 August 1932, and captain on 1 August 1938.

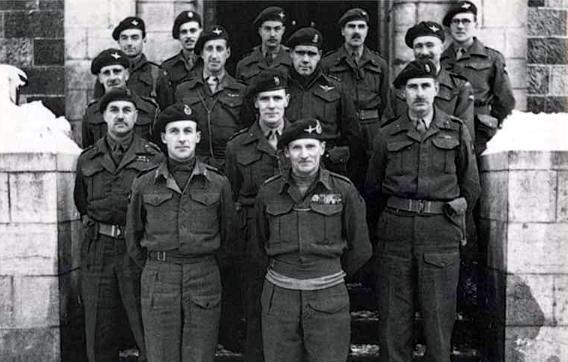
Field Marshal Montgomery and senior officers of the 6th Airborne Division in the Ardennes, January 1945. Stood first on the left in the third row is Lieutenant Colonel Kenneth Darling.

Soon after the outbreak of World War II in September 1939 Darling returned to the United Kingdom where, from January−April 1940 he attended the Staff College, Camberley as a student, and after graduating he was made a brigade major with the 1st London Brigade, part of the 1st London Division. Serving briefly as a General Staff Officer Grade 2 (GSO2) at the War Office, he was an instructor at the Senior Officers' School, Wiltshire, from January−October 1941, before returning to the War Office for eight months as GSO1 Military Training. From June 1942 he was commanding officer (CO) of the 11th Battalion, Royal Fusiliers. He commanded the battalion, a second line Territorial Army which formed part of the 140th Brigade, itself part of the 47th (London) Infantry Division.

He served in North West Europe during 1944 and 1945 and was appointed a Companion of the Distinguished Service Order on 7 June 1945 while serving with the 12th (Yorkshire) Parachute Battalion, initially as its second-in-command and then as its commanding officer.

He became commander of the 5th Parachute Brigade in 1946, then serving in Palestine during the Palestine Emergency, of the Airborne Forces Depot in 1948 and of the 16th Independent Parachute Brigade in 1950.

He of I (British) Corps from 1955, general officer commanding II Corps from 1956 and then deputy director, staff duties, at the War Office from 1957. He went on to be general officer commanding and director of operations Cyprus District in 1958, director of infantry in 1960 and general officer commanding I (British) Corps in 1962. His last appointments were as general officer commanding-in-chief at Southern Command in 1964 and commander in chief of Allied Forces Northern Europe from 1967 until his retirement in 1969.

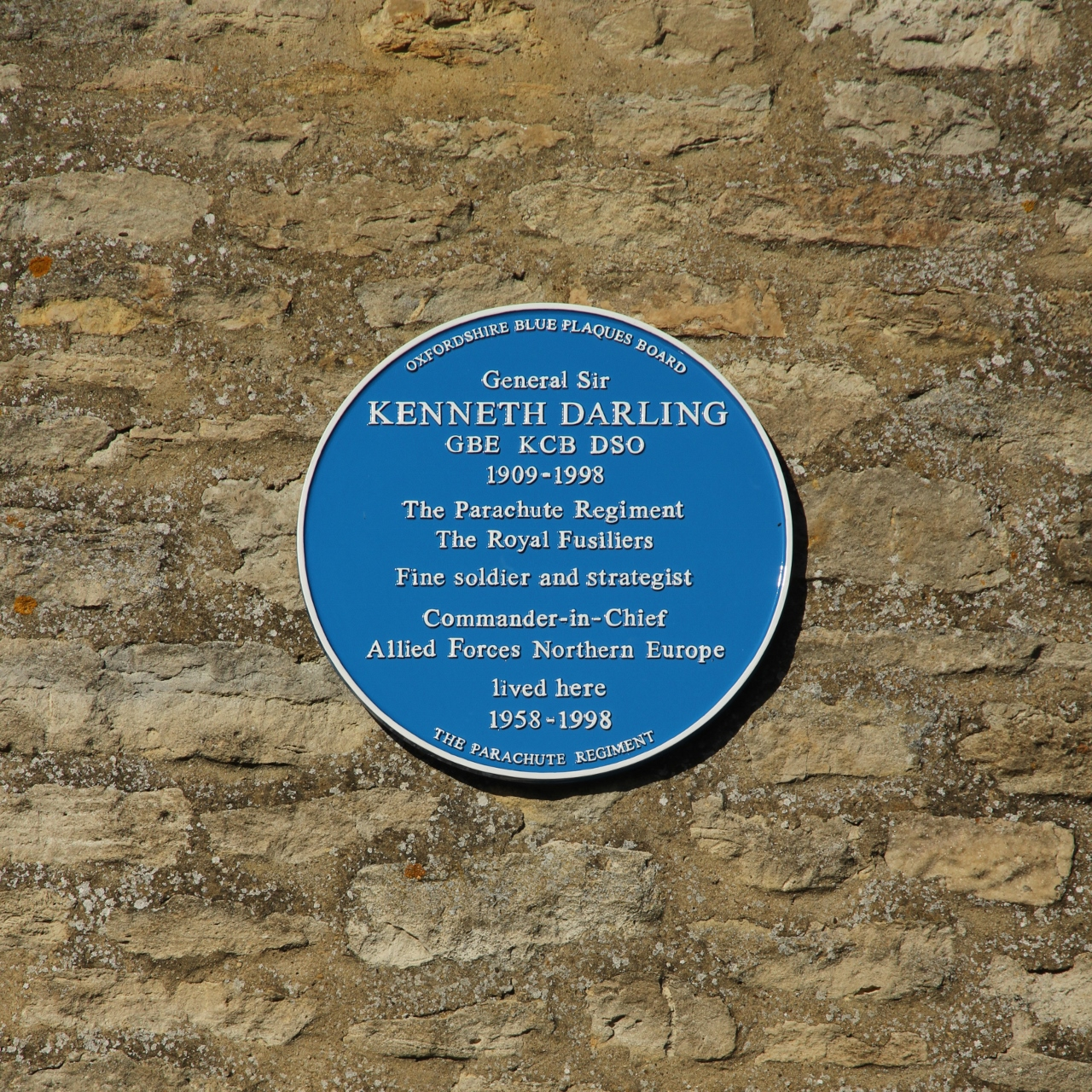
Oxfordshire Blue Plaque on Darling's former home in Chesterton, Oxfordshire

Darling was appointed a Knight Grand Cross of the Order of the British Empire in 1969, Knight Commander of the Order of the Bath in 1963, Commander of the Order of the British Empire in 1957 and Companion of the Order of the Bath in 1957. He was Honorary Colonel of the Royal Fusiliers (City of London Regiment) from 1963 to 1968, Colonel Commandant of the Parachute Regiment from 1965 to 1967, Honorary Colonel of the Royal Regiment of Fusiliers from 1968 to 1974 and ADC General to the Queen during 1968 and 1969.

In 1941 Darling married Pamela Denison-Pender (1915–1990). His wife's sister, Cynthia, was married to the soldier and racing correspondent Roger Mortimer.

Darling lived at Vicarage Farmhouse, Chesterton, Oxfordshire from 1958 until his death on 31 October 1998. An Oxfordshire Blue Plaque commemorating him was unveiled on his house on 4 July 2015.

== Sources ==
- Who Was Who. Vol. X, 1996–2000. London. 2001. ISBN 0-7136-5439-2.
- Norton, GG (1973). The Red Devils. Leo Cooper Famous Regiment Series. London: Macmillan. ISBN 978-0330236317.

Military offices
Preceded by Sir Charles Jones	GOC 1st (British) Corps; 1962–1963	Succeeded by Sir Richard Goodwin
Preceded by Sir Robert Bray	GOC-in-C Southern Command; 1964–1966	Succeeded by Sir Geoffrey Baker
Preceded by Sir Robert Bray	Commander-in-Chief of Allied Forces Northern Europe; 1967–1969	Succeeded by Sir Walter Walker
Honorary titles
Preceded by Francis Rome	Colonel of the Royal Fusiliers; 1963–1968	Succeeded by Regiment disbanded
Preceded by New regiment	Colonel of the Royal Regiment of Fusiliers; 1968–1974	Succeeded by George Harris Lea
