= Patrick Brind =

Royal Navy Admiral (1892–1963)

Admiral Sir Patrick Brind GBE KCB
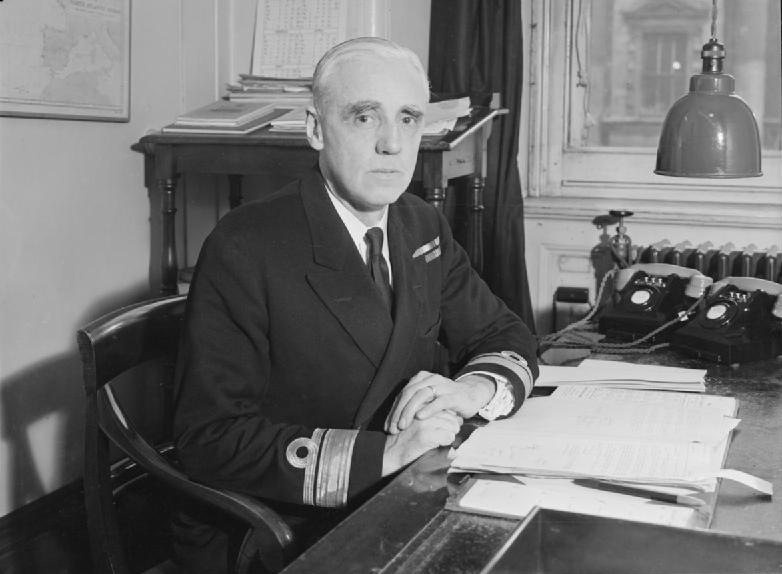
- Rear Admiral Brind at his desk at the Admiralty, c. 1942–44
- Born: 12 May 1892; Paignton, Devon, England, United Kingdom of Great Britain and Ireland
- Died: 4 October 1963 (aged 71); Lye Green, near Crowborough, Sussex, England, United Kingdom
- Military career
- Allegiance: United Kingdom
- Branch: Royal Navy
- Service years: 1905–1953
- Rank: Admiral
- Nickname: "Daddy"
- Commands: Allied Forces Northern Europe (1951–53); Far East Fleet (1949–1951); Royal Naval College, Greenwich (1946–48); 4th Cruiser Squadron (1944–46); HMS Birmingham (1938–1940); HMS Orion (1936–37)
- Conflicts: First World War; Second World War
- Awards: Knight Grand Cross of the Order of the British Empire; Knight Commander of the Order of the Bath; Officer of the Legion of Merit (United States)

Admiral Sir Eric James Patrick Brind, GBE, KCB (12 May 1892 – 4 October 1963) was a senior officer in the Royal Navy who served as the first Commander-in-Chief Allied Forces Northern Europe from 1951 to 1953.

== Naval career ==
Brind served in the First World War on the gunboat HMS Excellent, followed by HMS Malaya, and finally on the monitor HMS Sir John Moore.

After the war, Brind was captain of HMS Orion and then of HMS Birmingham.

Brind also served in the Second World War as Chief of Staff to the Commander-in-Chief, Home Fleet from 1940 to 1942 when he became Assistant Chief of the Naval Staff. He was made commander of cruisers in the British Pacific Fleet in 1945.

Brind became President of the Royal Naval College, Greenwich, in 1946 and then Commander-in-Chief of the Far East Fleet in 1949. It was under Brind's command that one of his ships, HMS Amethyst sailed up the Yangtze River and was stranded there for six weeks. He was made Commander-in-Chief, Allied Forces Northern Europe in 1951; he retired in 1953.

== Honours and awards ==
- 11 June 1946 – Vice Admiral Eric James Patrick Brind CB CBE is appointed a Knight Commander of the Order of the Bath (KCB) for distinguished services during the war in the Far East.
- 3 December 1946 – Vice Admiral Sir Eric James Patrick Brind KCB CBE is awarded Legion of Merit, officer degree for services whilst in command of units of the British Pacific Fleet attached to the United States Pacific Fleet during operations against the enemy from 15 to 14 March 1945.
- 1 January 1951 – Admiral Sir Eric James Patrick Brind KCB CBE is promoted to Knight Grand Cross of the Order of the British Empire.

Military offices
Preceded by Augustus Agar	President, Royal Naval College, Greenwich; 1946–1948	Succeeded by Sir Geoffrey Oliver
Preceded by Sir Denis Boyd	Commander-in-Chief, Far East Fleet; 1949–1951	Succeeded by Sir Guy Russell
New office	Commander-in-Chief of Allied Forces Northern Europe; 1951–1953	Succeeded by Sir Robert Mansergh
