= Mount Kolsaas (Monet series) =

1895 series of paintings by Claude Monet

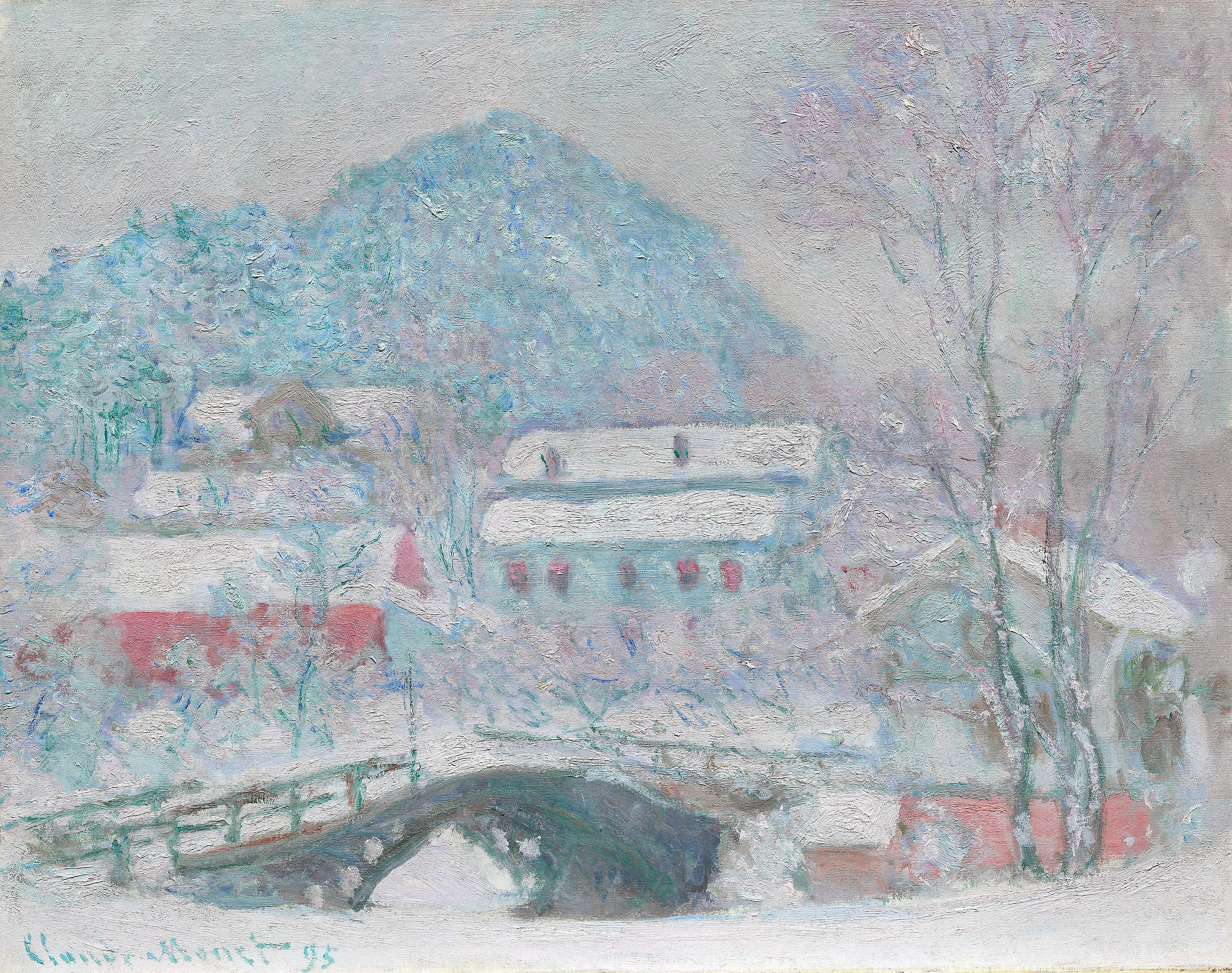
Sandviken village beneath Mount Kolsaas (Claude Monet, 1895)

The Mount Kolsaas series of oil paintings was created by the French Impressionist painter Claude Monet in 1895.

In the winter of early 1895 Monet decided to undertake a painting trip to Norway, where his eldest stepson, Jacques Hoschedé, was living at the time. The journey, by train and ferry, was long and exhausting and on arrival in Christiana (now Oslo) he spent several days looking for suitable subject matter, eventually ending up in a farmhouse occupied by other artists in the area of Sandvika (or Sandviken), some 15 km (9.3 miles) west of Oslo. There, after painting scenes of the local fjord and a nearby village, he created a series of paintings of Mount Kolsaas. In Monet's typical style, each painting was done out of doors at different times of the day and in different weather conditions. He completed the undertaking by mid-March.

== List of paintings ==
- All the works listed are described as Painting - oil on canvas .
- The Catalog Nos are as defined by Daniel Wildenstein in the Monet: Catalogue Raisonné.

Painting	Year	Catalog No	Museum	Picture
Mount Kolsaas, Norway	1895	(W.1406)	Musée Marmottan Monet	
Mount Kolsaas	1895	(W.1407)	Musée Marmottan Monet	
Mount Kolsaas	1895	(W.1408)	Private collection	
Mount Kolsaas, Sun Effect	1895	(W.1409)	Private collection	
Mount Kolsaas in Misty Weather	1895	(W.1411)	Private collection	
Mount Kolsaas, Rose Reflection	1895	(W.1415)	Musée d'Orsay	
Mount Kolsaas, Snowstorm	1895	(W.1417)	Private collection	
Mount Kolsaas, Norway	1895	(W.1418)	Private collection	

== See also ==
- List of paintings by Claude Monet
