= Nigel Poett =

British Army general (1907–1991)

General Sir Nigel Poett KCB DSO & Bar
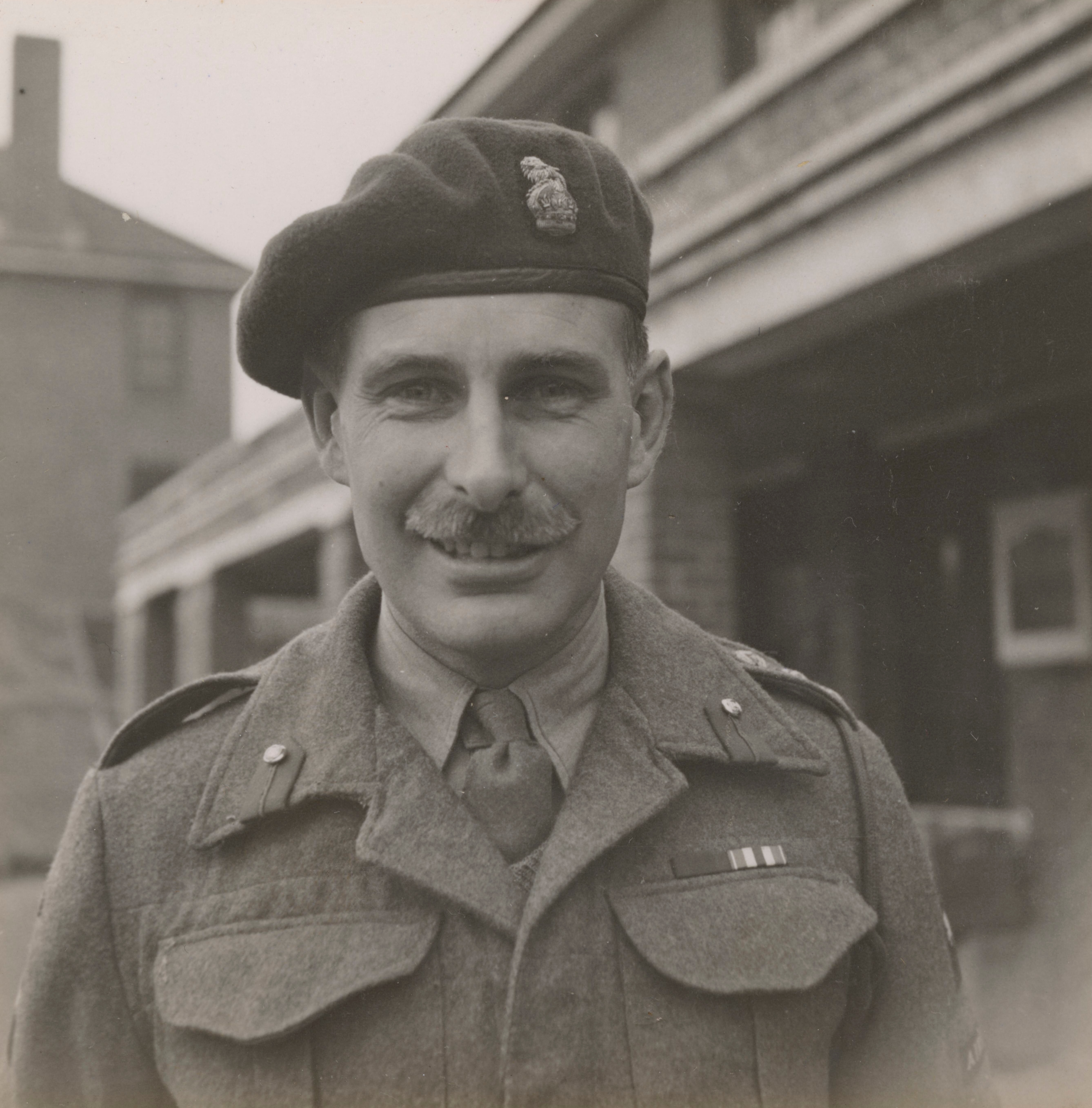
- Brigadier Poett in November 1944
- Born: 20 August 1907
- Died: 29 October 1991 (aged 84)
- Military career
- Allegiance: United Kingdom
- Branch: British Army
- Rank: General
- Unit: Durham Light Infantry
- Commands: Far East Land Forces (1961–1963); Southern Command (1958–1961); Staff College, Camberley (1957–1958); 3rd Division (1952–1954); 5th Parachute Brigade (1943–1946); 11th Battalion Durham Light Infantry (1942–1943)
- Conflicts: North-West Frontier; Second World War; Operation Tonga
- Awards: Knight Commander of the Order of the Bath; Distinguished Service Order & Bar; Silver Star (United States)

General Sir Joseph Howard Nigel Poett, KCB, DSO & Bar (20 August 1907 – 29 October 1991) was a British Army officer who commanded the 5th Parachute Brigade during the Second World War.

== Early life ==
Poett was born on 20 August 1907, at a rented family house in Winterborne St. Martin, near the city of Dorchester. He was a twin, born at the same time as his sister Angela. Poett was the son of Julia Baldwin and Major-General Joseph Howard Poett, who saw service in the Second Anglo-Afghan War and the Boer War, and was commanding the 1st Battalion of the Dorsetshire Regiment in British India when Poett was born. Shortly after his birth, Poett's family moved to India to join his father, and then in 1910 they moved, this time to Canada, where his father hoped to take up a new career in farming. However, the family did not take well to their Canadian surroundings, Poett's mother in particular missing her European friends, and in 1914 the family moved to Britain. Poett's father returned to service in the First World War, attaining the honorary rank of brigadier general.

Poett was first educated at a private boarding school, and then moved to Downside School, a Catholic public school. There he enjoyed a number of sports and joined the Officer Training Corps, but later regretted that he studied little of English language or Classical studies, instead being placed in a specialised class that focused on the mathematical and scientific skills required for pupils to join the Royal Military College, Sandhurst. After studying at Sandhurst, Poett opted to join the Durham Light Infantry, and was gazetted as an officer into the regiment on 1 September 1927.

== Military career ==
=== Inter-war period ===
==== Egypt and Razmak ====
The flag of an anti-British resistance movement in Waziristan, active during the 1930s.

In November 1927, Poett was posted with the regiment to Egypt, with his battalion being stationed at Mustapha Barracks on the outskirts of the city of Alexandria. In December 1929, Poett was informed that his father had died, although his mother urged him not to return home, as he would not be able to return to Britain before the funeral took place. One month later, in January 1930, Poett was informed that he was to be transferred to the regiment's 2nd Battalion, which was soon to move to Razmak, a frontier post in Waziristan on the North-West Frontier. Poett first spent a month's leave visiting his family and travelling around Europe, and was then transported by troopship to Port Said. Arriving in April, Poett joined a draft of troops joining the 2nd Battalion, and then spent two weeks on a train travelling to the city of Bannu; once there, the draft were forced to remain until they could join one of the lorry columns that transported troops to Razmak. These only travelled once or twice a week, as the area surrounding the route to Razmak had to be guarded by British troops to protect the lorries from hostile tribesmen and snipers. The area around Razmak was in open conflict, with hostile tribesmen attacking those villages that had allied themselves with the British authorities, and sniping at British patrols.

The camp at Razmak was strongly fortified with barbed wire and guard towers, as well as machine-gun and mortar positions. It was garrisoned by a brigade, which included a unit of mountain gunners and a number of Sappers from the Royal Engineers, as well as Poett's battalion. Upon arrival, he was attached to the battalion's 'A' Company, which was commanded by Oswald Paget, an old family friend. Only a short time later, Poett participated in an action by the battalion known as going on 'column', in which the battalion patrolled the area around the camp in order to 'show the flag' and highlight its continued presence at the camp. It was an extremely physical activity, and Poett found his first 'column' very trying, particularly due to the lack of water supplies carried by the troops during the process. Poett found that the hardest, and most dangerous part of the 'column', was when he commanded a picket that ranged in front of the battalion. When ordered by the battalion commander, the picket would occupy and then hold a hilltop that the battalion itself would later occupy; the danger was found in rushing the top of the hill, which would risk being fired upon by hostile tribesmen, as well as running fast down the often steep hill to withdraw and rejoin the battalion. Although his first 'column' was only a practice exercise, the political situation around Razmak rapidly worsened during Poett's time at the camp, and on further 'columns' he found himself fired upon a number of times. Poett did find one positive feature of the patrols, however – his fitness levels quickly increased, and he was later of the opinion that he reached the peak of his physical fitness whilst serving at Razmak. In the time between 'columns', Poett played polo with his fellow officers, and also helped level a patch of ground by hand, on which a permanent sports facility for the garrison was erected. Eventually the battalion's time at the camp came to an end and it transferred to Barrackpore, some fifteen miles from the city of Calcutta.

==== India and the Sudan ====
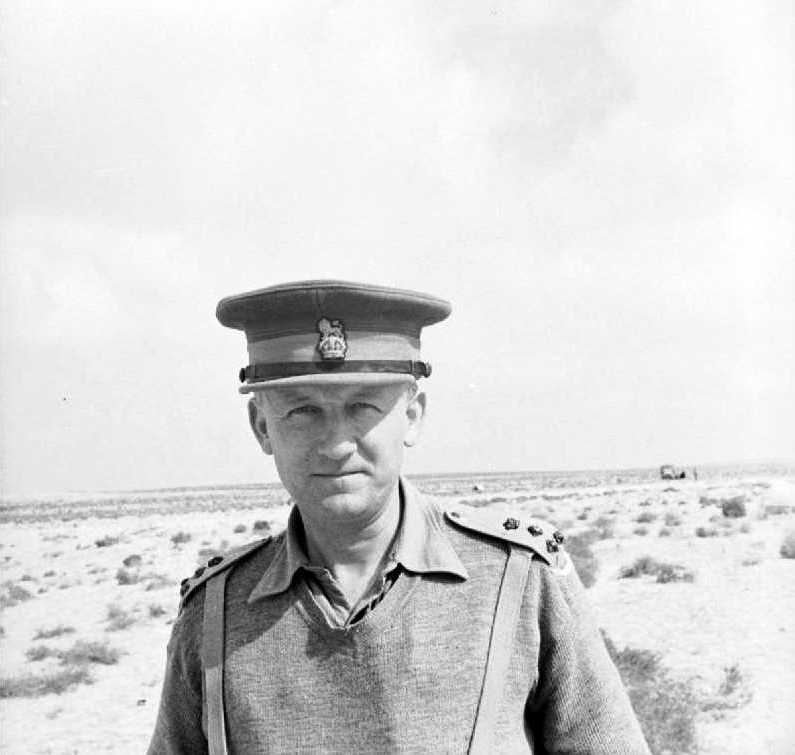
Poett served under Lieutenant General William Gott in India during the 1930s.

Just before leaving Razmak, Poett had been informed that he had been selected to serve as an aide-de-camp to the Governor of Bengal for six weeks, and upon arrival at Barrackpore found that he would start his duties in November 1930. While he waited, Poett was kept busy by commanding the companies of officers who decided to take annual leave in Britain, as well as learning Urdu in order to communicate with the Indian soldiers in the companies he commanded. Between November and the middle of January Poett then took up services as an ADC in Government House with the temporary rank of captain, one of three stationed there; he spent his time attending events with the Governor, as well as receiving and attending to visitors who wanted to see the Governor. During his time at Government House, Poett met General H.K. Bethell, the General Commanding the Presidency and Assam District. When the left Government House and returned to his battalion, General Bethell had Poett detached from the regiment to temporarily replace his ADC who had gone on leave. Bethell lived near Fort William in Calcutta, and Poett found it a demanding '6am to midnight' job. Poett's duties generally included exercising the General's ponies at his estate, joining the General when he inspected British and Commonwealth units in the area, and also accompanying him on tours around India.

Poett eventually finished as Bethell's ADC and returned to his battalion, but not for long; he was then transferred to General Bethell's staff as a General Staff Officer 3rd Grade. This meant increased pay for Poett, as well as experience as a staff officer; he served under William Gott, then Bethell's General Staff Officer 2nd Grade, a future lieutenant general and intended commander of the British Eighth Army before he was killed in 1942. Poett returned to his battalion after a period as General Staff Officer, and then spent some time in Britain on leave. When he returned in 1934 he was trained on the Vickers machine gun, and then gazetted as the battalion's next adjutant. Poett took another period of leave to visit his brother-in-law in Australia, and during the journey met and fell in love with his future wife, Julia Herrick, on the ship from Bombay to Calcutta. Julia was the daughter of Mr E J Herrick, chairman of directors of Williams & Kettle. After a brief time together in Australia with Julia, Poett returned to Bombay to act as battalion adjutant. At the end of 1935 the battalion was transferred to the Sudan, taking up station near the city of Khartoum. During the battalion's transfer, as well as for some time afterwards, Poett studied for the entrance exam at the British Army's Staff College. Although he passed the exams, he was unable to get a vacancy and eventually gave up. Then in April 1937, Poett took leave to the city of Wellington in New Zealand, where he married Julia on 26 May 1937. The next month the married couple moved to Britain, with Poett resuming his duties as battalion adjutant in Woking, where the battalion had recently been transferred.

=== Second World War ===
==== War Office and Washington ====
Only a few days after Poett arrived in Britain, war had been declared on Germany and the Second World War had begun. He travelled to the regimental depot in County Durham, and after two weeks at Brancepeth Castle running troop exercises, he was informed that he had been promoted to the rank of major and appointed a General Staff Officer Grade 2. Poett would be attached to a branch of the War Office known as Staff Duties 2, and his specific duties were concerned with allocating weapons to British Army units positioned throughout the different theatres of war. In early May 1940, Poett was sent to the General Headquarters of the British Expeditionary Force, and when he returned to Britain at the port of Dover he was informed that the invasion of Belgium and France had begun during his journey. Poett appealed to the War Office to be released from staff duties and assigned to a division in the field, but it was not until the Dunkirk evacuation was over that a replacement was found for him. He was then assigned as the GSO 2 for the 2nd Infantry Division, which had only recently returned from France. The division was situated in East Riding and was responsible for the defence of a large section of Yorkshire coast; as a result a number of anti-invasion exercises were conducted by the division, and there were also a number of invasion warnings. One such alert took place when Poett was in Woking, where his wife had just given birth to his son Simon.

Upon his return from Woking, Poett was transferred to the War Office, and by early 1941 he had been promoted to lieutenant-colonel and became the General Staff Officer Grade 1 in charge of the Staff Duties 2 branch of the War Office. Poett was given a secretary to help him handle his new responsibilities, many of which were secret in nature; they included developing the Orders of Battle for oversea theatres such as the Middle East, and the allocation of space on convoys travelling to these theatres. At one point Poett had to defend a paper he had written, about the Middle East Order of Battle, to the Prime Minister Winston Churchill, who was unhappy with the large number of administrative units assigned to the theatre. Poett continued his work throughout 1941, and in late December he travelled to Washington D.C. in the United States of America alongside an officer from the Plans Directorate, with orders to assist the Anglo-American planning of the coming conflict. These initial planning meetings ended in January 1942, and Poett returned with the Prime Minister's party via a specially-charted train to Norfolk, Virginia, and then by flying boat to Britain via Bermuda; when he was leaving the hotel he had been staying in, Poett was informed that his hotel bills and expenses had been paid for by the Americans as part of the Lend Lease agreement between the two countries.

==== 5th Parachute Brigade ====
When he returned from Washington, Poett requested that the War Office return him to regimental duty and give him command of a regular infantry battalion. A short while later, Poett was ordered to take command of the 11th Battalion of the Durham Light Infantry. At the time the battalion formed a part of the 70th Brigade, itself attached to the 49th Infantry Division. Poett assumed command of the battalion in Herefordshire, but soon travelled around the country with it, moving to Wales and Scotland, before finishing up in the Welsh town of Llanelli.

==== Normandy ====
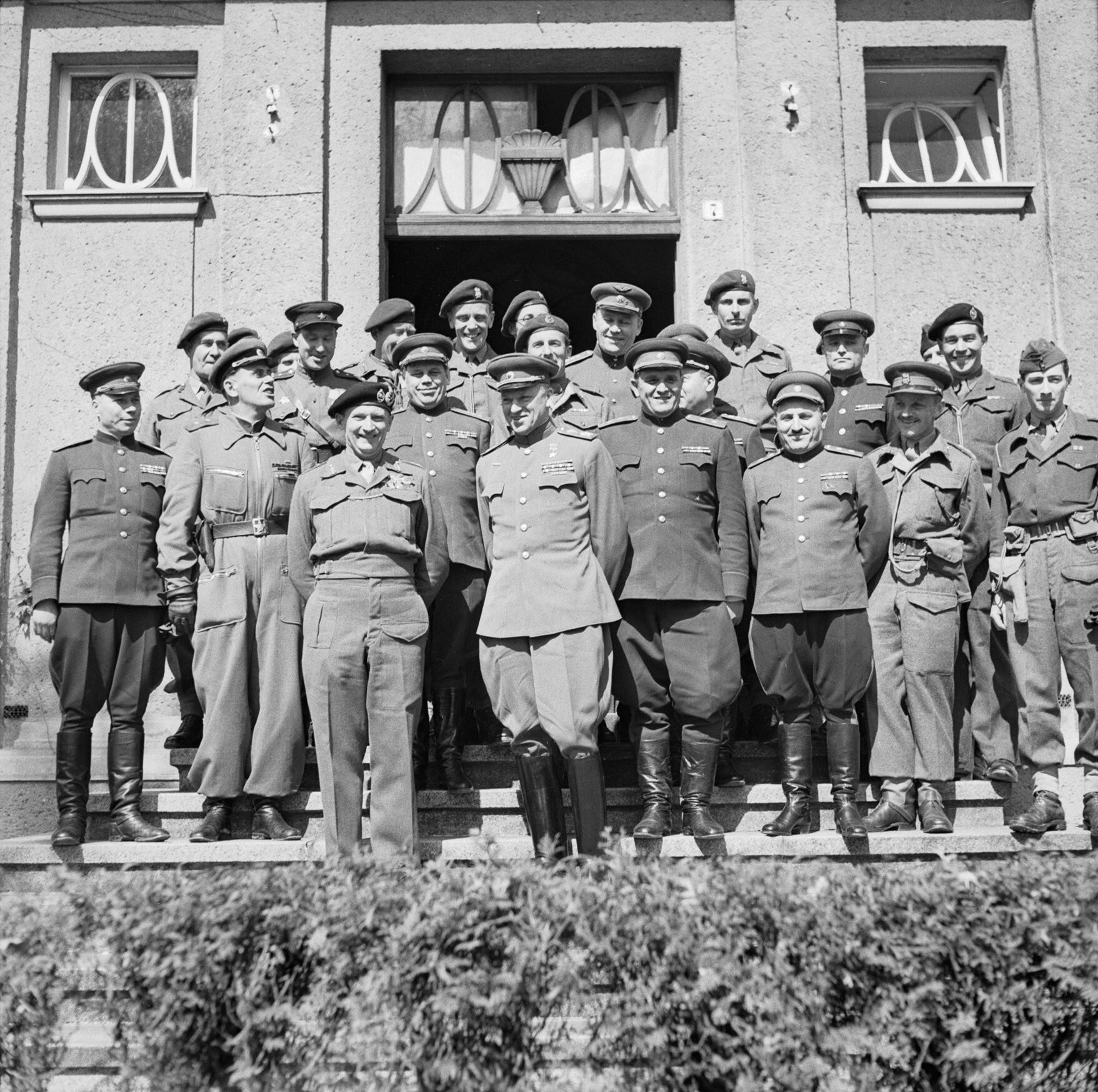
The Russian Marshal Konstantin Rokossovsky with Field Marshal Sir Bernard Montgomery and their respective Chiefs of Staff at the British 6th Airborne Division HQ at Wismar, where the first link up between British and Russian forces took place on 28 April. Montgomery and Rokossovsky are in the front row. Brigadier James Hill is stood two ranks behind Rokossovsky, while Brigadier Nigel Poett stands in the same row as Hill, furthest from the right and Major General Eric Bols stands directly behind Rokkosovsky.

In May 1943, Poett was assigned the command of the 5th Parachute Brigade, 6th Airborne Division. In the planning for Operation Overlord, the 5th Parachute Brigade was assigned the task of reinforcing two road bridges across the River Orne and the Caen Canal following earlier capture by a glider coup de main force. Poett jumped on D-Day at 0019 hours, with the pathfinders and a small team. At 0050 hours, Poett made contact with Lieutenant Sweeney at Horsa Bridge. He then made his way to the Pegasus Bridge and Major Howard.

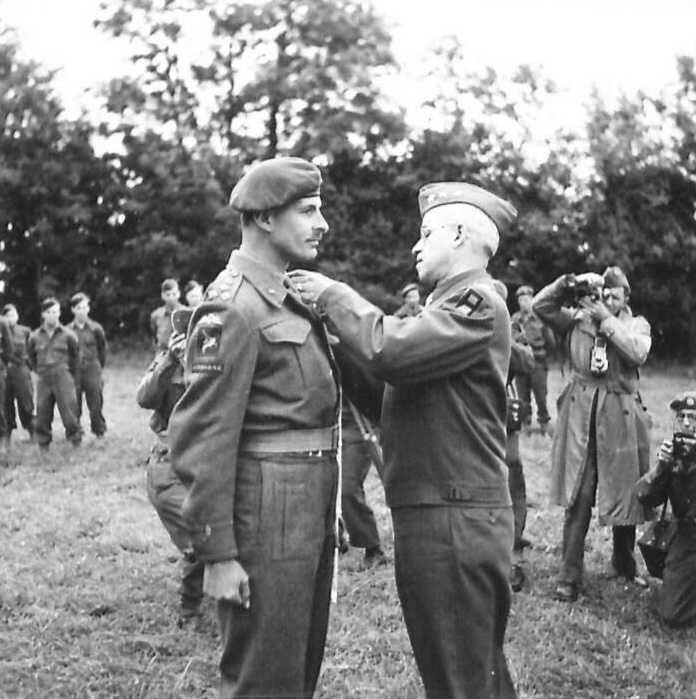
Poett receiving a Silver Star from General Omar Bradley, 13 July 1944.

==== Ardennes ====
The Battle of Bure took place where Poet's 5th Parachute Brigade took the town after heavy bitter fighting during the Battle of the Bulge.

=== Post-war career ===
He became Chief of Staff at Headquarters Far East Land Forces in 1950, General Officer Commanding 3rd Division based in the Middle East in 1952 and then Director of Military Operations at the War Office in 1954. He went on to be Commandant of the Staff College, Camberley in 1957 and General Officer Commanding Southern Command in 1958 before returning to Far East Land Forces in 1961 as Commander-in-Chief prior to his retirement in 1963. In September 1963, after his retirement, he gave a speech to the Commonwealth Club, San Francisco, on the subject 'Can the Communists Take South East Asia' and a recording is available He was knighted in 1958.

In later life he was an active supporter of the Airborne Assault Normandy Trust a UK-based charity dedicated to preserving the history of the British 6th Airborne Division's pivotal role in the Normandy landings of June 1944. As such as he instigated the restoration and preservation of the Merville Battery, which opened in time for the 40th anniversary of D-Day in the summer of 1984. Restoration work was carried out by soldiers from 36 Engineer Regiment, based in Maidstone in the UK.

== Bibliography ==
- Buckingham, William F. (2005). D-Day The First 72 Hours. Tempus Publishing. ISBN 0-7524-2842-X.
- Dover, Major Victor (1981). The Sky Generals. Cassell. ISBN 0-304-30480-8.
- Frost, Major-General John (1994). A Drop Too Many. Leo Cooper. ISBN 0-85052-391-5.
- Gale, General Sir Richard (1968). Call to Arms: An Autobiography. Hutchinson & Co.
- Harclerode, Peter (2005). Wings of War – Airborne Warfare 1918–1945. Weidenfeld & Nicolson. ISBN 0-304-36730-3.
- Otway, Lieutenant-Colonel T.B.H. (1990). The Second World War 1939–1945 Army – Airborne Forces. Imperial War Museum. ISBN 0-901627-57-7.
- Poett, General Sir Nigel (1991). Pure Poett: The Autobiography of General Sir Nigel Poett. Leo Cooper. ISBN 0-85052-339-7.
- Saunders, Hilary St. George (1972). The Red Beret – The Story of The Parachute Regiment 1940–1945. White Lion Publishers Ltd. ISBN 0-85617-823-3.
- Thompson, Major-General Julian (1990). Ready for Anything: The Parachute Regiment at War. Fontana. ISBN 0-00-637505-7.

Military offices
Preceded by Hugh Stockwell	GOC 3rd Division; 1952–1954	Succeeded by John Churcher
Honorary titles
Preceded by Sir Terence Airey	Colonel of the Durham Light Infantry; 1956–1965	Succeeded by Abdy Ricketts
Military offices
Preceded by Charles Jones	Commandant of the Staff College, Camberley; 1957–1958	Succeeded by Reginald Hewetson
Preceded by Sir George Erskine	GOC-in-C Southern Command; 1958–1961	Succeeded by Sir Robert Bray
Preceded by Sir Richard Hull	C-in-C Far East Land Forces; 1961–1963	Succeeded by Sir Reginald Hewetson
