= Robert Mansergh =

British Army general

General Sir Robert Mansergh GCB KBE MC
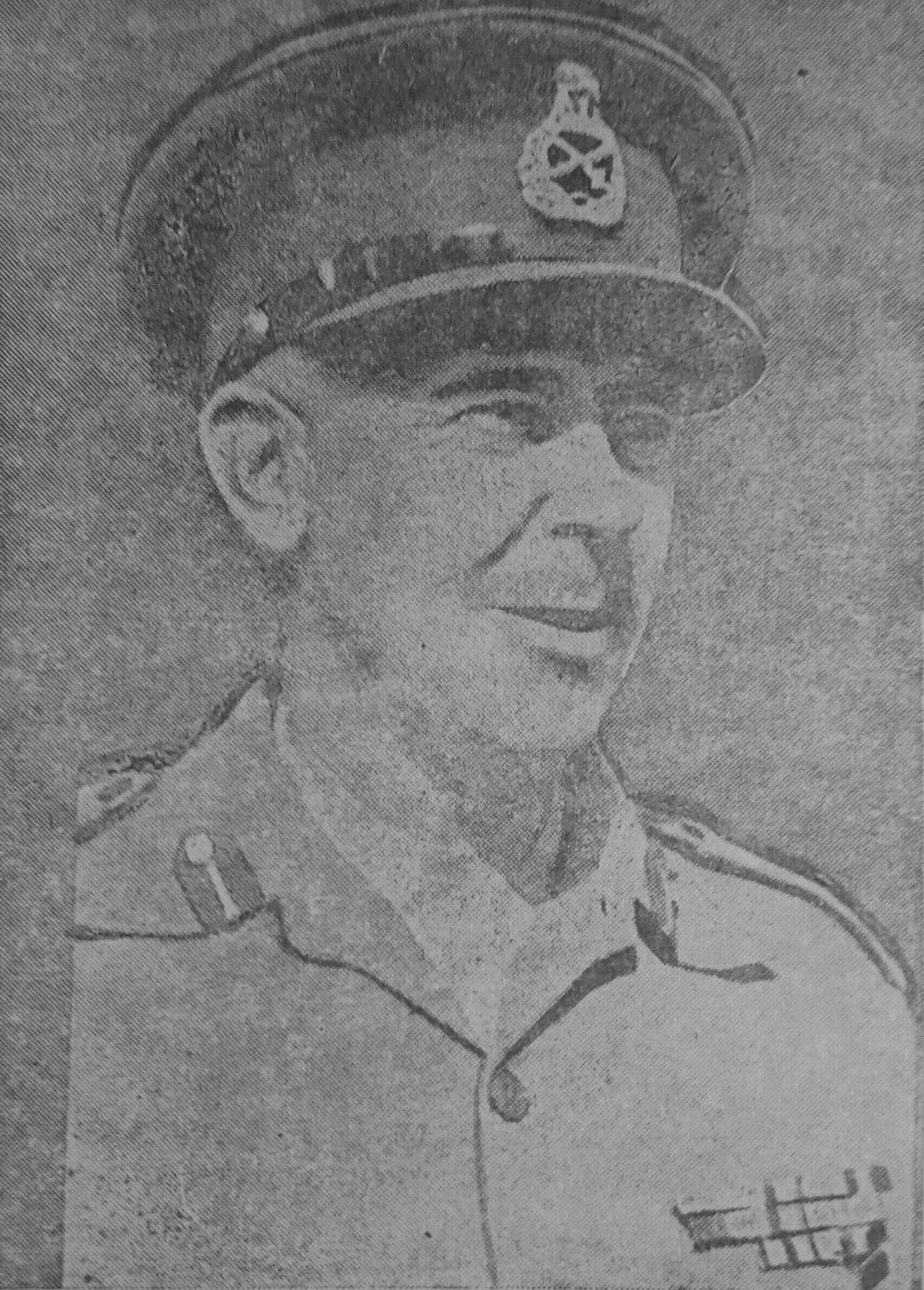
- Born: 12 May 1900; Cape Colony
- Died: 8 November 1970 (aged 70)
- Military career
- Allegiance: United Kingdom
- Branch: British Army; Indian Army
- Service years: 1920–1959
- Rank: General
- Service number: 18612
- Units: Royal Field Artillery; Royal Artillery
- Commands: United Kingdom Land Forces (1956–59); Allied Forces Northern Europe (1953–56); British Forces in Hong Kong (1949–51); XV Indian Corps (1946–47); Allied Forces Netherlands East Indies (1946); 5th Indian Infantry Division (1945–46); 11th (East Africa) Division (1945); Royal Artillery 5th Indian Infantry Division (1942–44)
- Conflicts: Second World War: Battle of Surabaya
- Awards: Knight Grand Cross of the Order of the Bath; Knight Commander of the Order of the British Empire; Military Cross; Mentioned in Despatches

General Sir Eric Carden Robert Mansergh, GCB, KBE, MC (12 May 1900 – 8 November 1970) was a senior British Army officer during and after the Second World War.

== Military career ==
Robert Mansergh was born in Cape Colony and educated at the Rondebosch Boys' High School in Cape Town and the Royal Military Academy, Woolwich. He was commissioned into the Royal Field Artillery in 1920. He was seconded for service on the staff on 16 March 1928 and served with the British Military Mission to Iraq between 1931 and 1935, being awarded the Military Cross in 1932.

During the Second World War, Mansergh served with the Royal Artillery in Eritrea, Abyssinia, the Western Desert of Libya, the Middle East, Persia, Iraq, Arakan, Assam and Burma. Having been promoted acting major general in 1944, he commanding the 11th (East Africa) Division and the 5th Indian Infantry Division.

Promoted acting lieutenant general in 1946, Mansergh commanded the XV Indian Corps and was then appointed Commander-in-Chief of Allied Forces in the Netherlands East Indies. Mansergh later served as Military Secretary from 1948 to 1949, Commander of British Forces in Hong Kong from 1949 to 1951, Deputy Commander-in-Chief of Allied Forces Northern Europe from 1951 to 1953, Commander-in Chief of Allied Forces Northern Europe from 1953 to 1956 and Commander-in-Chief of the United Kingdom Land Forces from 1956 to 1959. In that capacity he headed a Committee which looked at the Administration of the British Army.

Mansergh also served as Colonel Commandant of the Royal Artillery and the Royal Horse Artillery Regiments.

In July 1957, in his role as Commander-in-Chief UK Land Forces, General Mansergh was a guest at the annual Tynwald Day Ceremony at St John's, Isle of Man. He was a guest of the Island's Lieutenant Governor Sir Ambrose Dundas-Flux-Dundas.

== Bibliography ==
- Smart, Nick (2005). Biographical Dictionary of British Generals of the Second World War. Barnesley: Pen & Sword. ISBN 1844150496.

Military offices
| Preceded by Sir Charles Keightley | Military Secretary; 1948–1949 | Succeeded by Sir Kenneth McLean |
| Preceded by Sir Francis Festing | Commander of British Forces in Hong Kong; 1949–1951 | Succeeded by Sir Geoffrey Evans |
| Preceded by Sir Patrick Brind | Commander-in-Chief of Allied Forces Northern Europe; 1953–1956 | Succeeded by Sir Cecil Sugden |
Honorary titles
| Preceded by Sir Cameron Nicholson | Master Gunner, St. James's Park; 1960–1970 | Succeeded by Sir Geoffrey Baker |
