= 185th Infantry Brigade (United Kingdom) =

- Active: Formed 1 September 1942
- Country: United Kingdom
- Branch: British Army
- Type: Infantry
- Size: Brigade
- Part of: 79th Armoured Division; 3rd Infantry Division

Insignia
- Identification symbol: Black Triangle with a smaller inverted Red Triangle inside
- Abbreviation: 185 Bde

The 185th Infantry Brigade (185 Bde) was an infantry brigade formation of the British Army raised during the Second World War that participated in the Normandy landings of 6 June 1944, fighting in the Normandy Campaign and the subsequent campaign in North-West Europe with the 3rd British Infantry Division.

== History ==
The Brigade was formed on 1 September 1942 by redesignation of 204th Independent Infantry Brigade (Home), a static Home Defence formation serving under Durham and North Riding Area HQ. It was assigned frontline infantry battalions and became the infantry component of the new 79th Armoured Division. When 79th Armoured was reorganised as a specialist armour formation in April 1943, 185th Brigade was transferred to the 3rd Infantry Division, training for Operation Overlord, the planned invasion of northern France. The 3rd Infantry Division was the first British formation to land on Sword Beach on 6th June (D-Day).

Sword covered 8 km from Ouistreham to Saint-Aubin-sur-Mer it was the furthest east of the landing points and around 15 km from Caen. The landing site was divided into four zones — Oboe, Peter, Queen and Roger (west-east). Opposition to the landings was the German 716th Static Infantry Division with beach obstacles, anti-tank ditches, mines, machine guns and mortars at the beaches and across the River Orne at Merville there were heavy guns. The nearby 21st Panzer division was in reserve

During the often intense fighting from Sword to Bremen, the 3rd Infantry Division suffered 2,586 killed with over 12,500 wounded or missing. Throughout the North West Europe Campaign, two members of the brigade (and division) were awarded the Victoria Cross. They were Corporal Sidney Bates of the 1st Battalion, Royal Norfolk Regiment and Private James Stokes of the 2nd Battalion, King's Shropshire Light Infantry.

== Composition ==
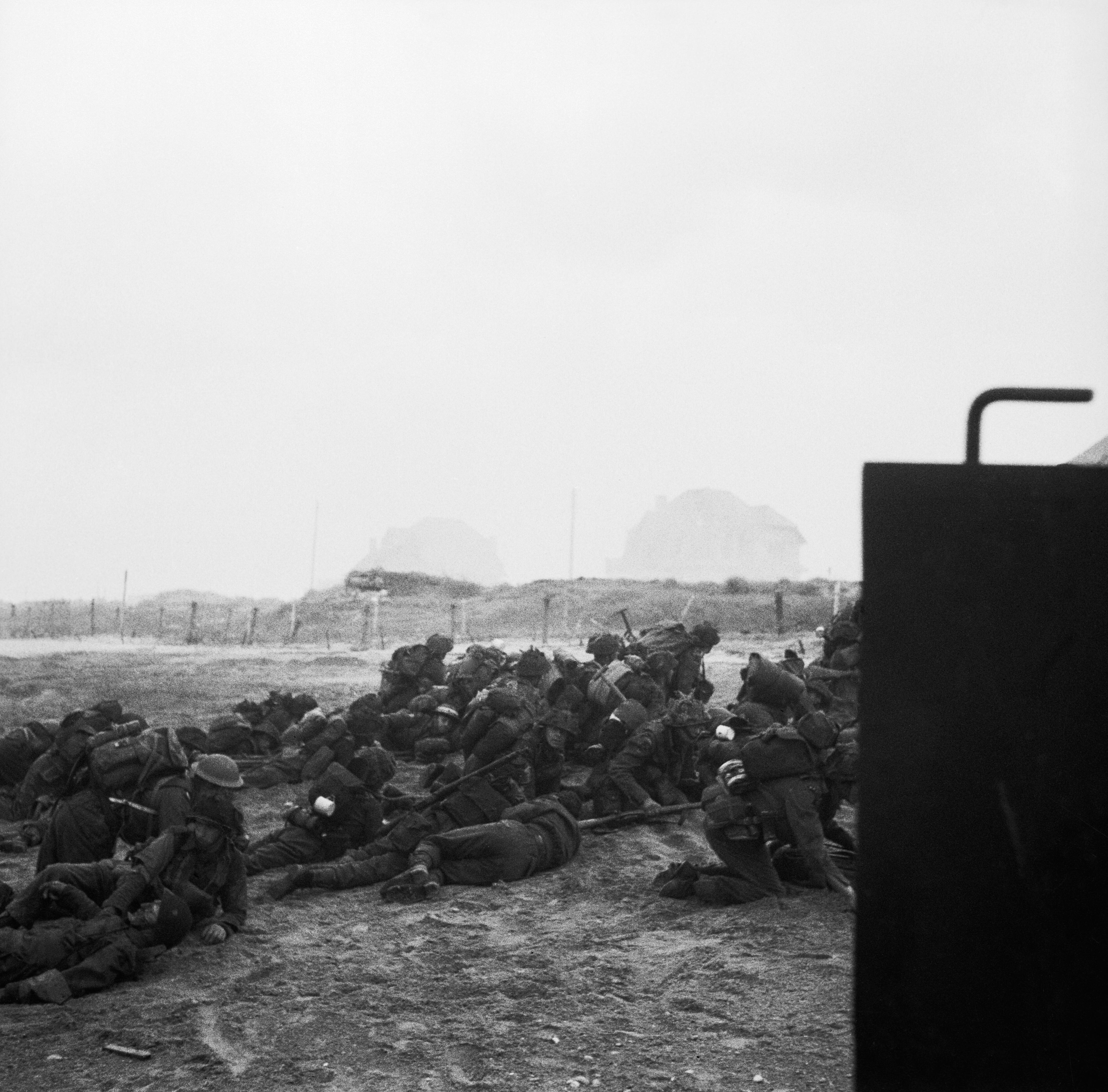
Infantry waiting to get off 'Queen White' Beach

The following units comprised 185th Brigade from its formation until August 1945:

- 2nd Battalion, Royal Warwickshire Regiment
- 1st Battalion, Royal Norfolk Regiment (until 17 August 1945)
- 2nd Battalion, King's Shropshire Light Infantry
- 1st Battalion, Highland Light Infantry (from 19 August 1945)

== Commanders ==
185th Brigade's wartime commanders were:

- Brigadier G. McI. S. Bruce (until 4 June 1943)
- Brigadier K.P. Smith (17 June 1943 – 2 July 1944)
- Brigadier Eric Bols (2 July–11 December 1944)
- Brigadier E.H.G. Grant (11 December 1944 – 15 January 1945)
- Brigadier Francis Matthews (from 20 January 1945)

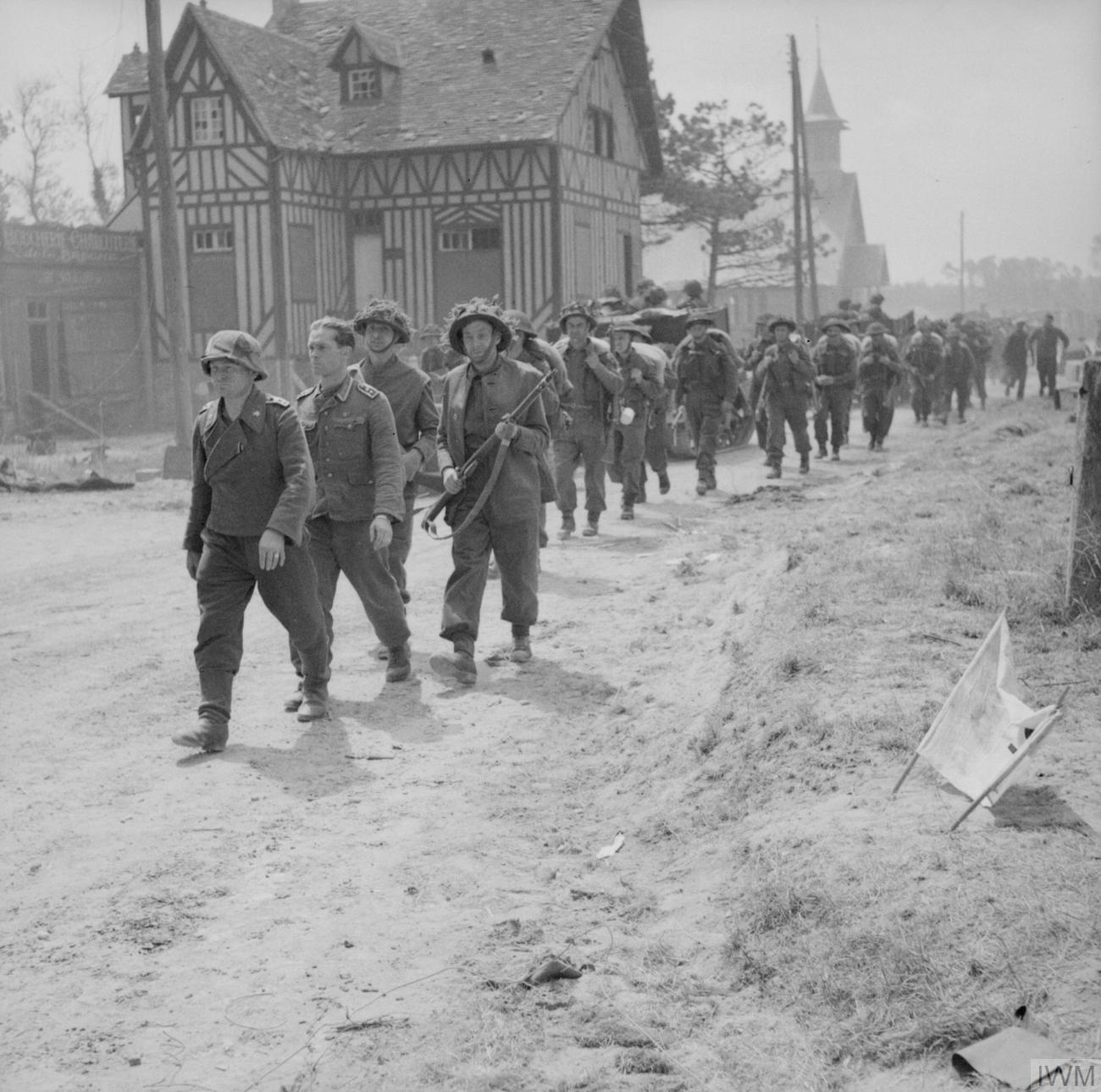
German prisoners being escorted back through La Brèche d'Hermanville, France, by men of the 2nd Battalion, King's Shropshire Light Infantry, 6 June 1944.

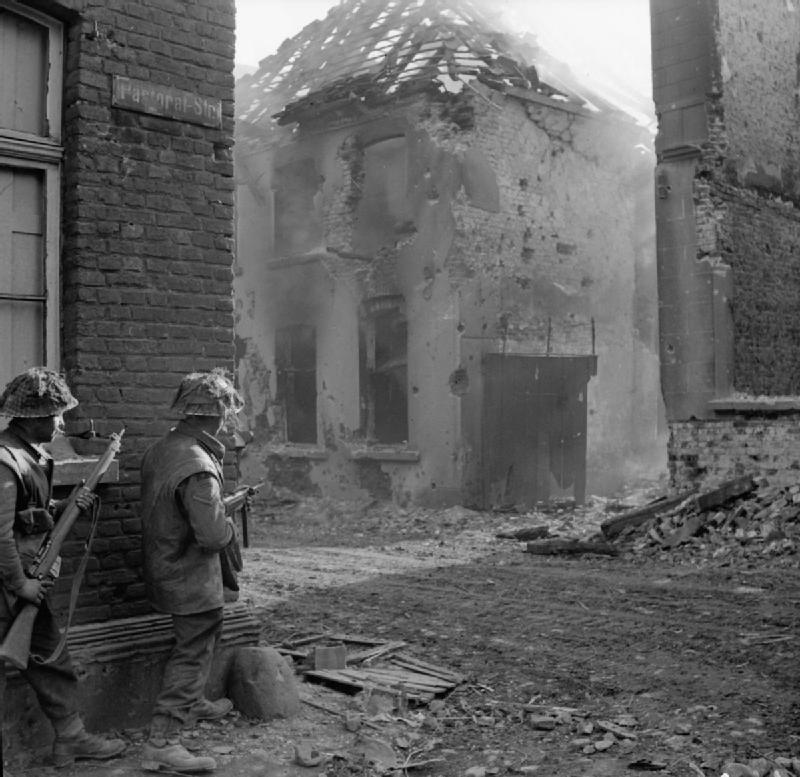
Men of the 1st Battalion, Royal Norfolk Regiment clearing enemy resistance in Kervenheim, Germany, 3 March 1945.

== Bibliography ==
- Patrick Delaforce, Monty's Iron Sides, Stroud: Alan Sutton, 1995, ISBN 0-7509-0781-9,
- Joslen, H. F. (2003) [1960]. Orders of Battle: Second World War, 1939–1945. Uckfield, East Sussex: Naval and Military Press. ISBN 978-1-84342-474-1.
