= 650th Military Intelligence Group =

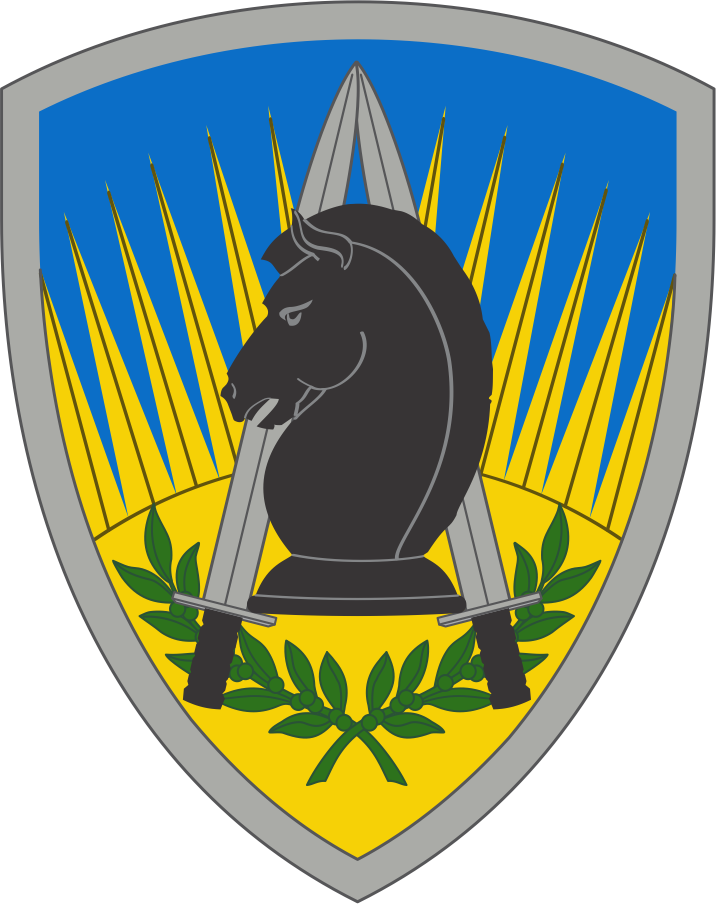
- Active: 1944-present
- Country: United States
- Branch: United States Army Reserve
- Type: Military Intelligence
- Size: Group (Brigade)
- Part of: Supreme Headquarters Allied Powers Europe
- Garrison/HQ: Mons, Belgium
- Motto: Security Truth Alliance

Commanders
- Current commander: Col. Christian M. Gregoire

Insignia
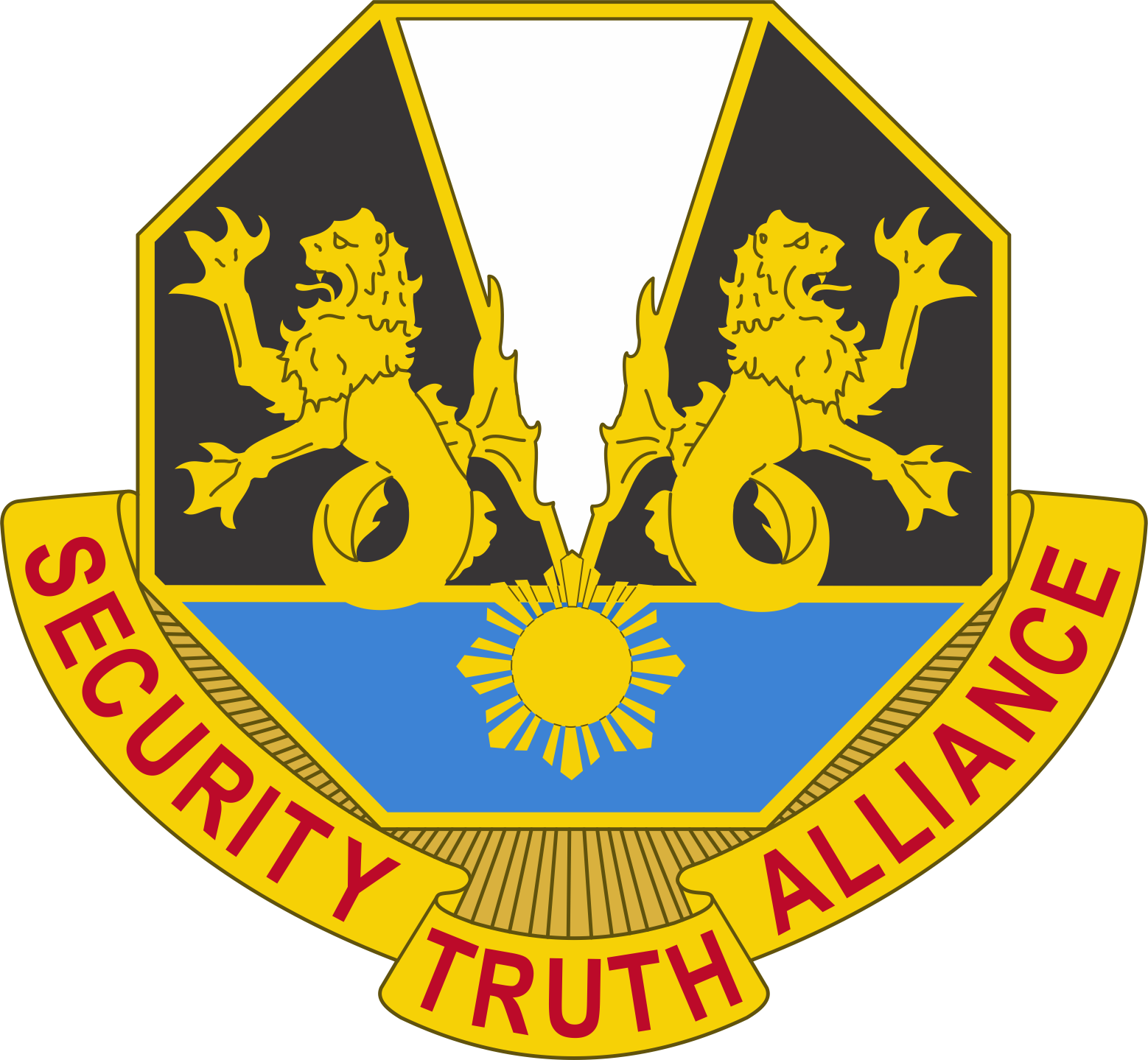
- 650th Military Intelligence Group DUI

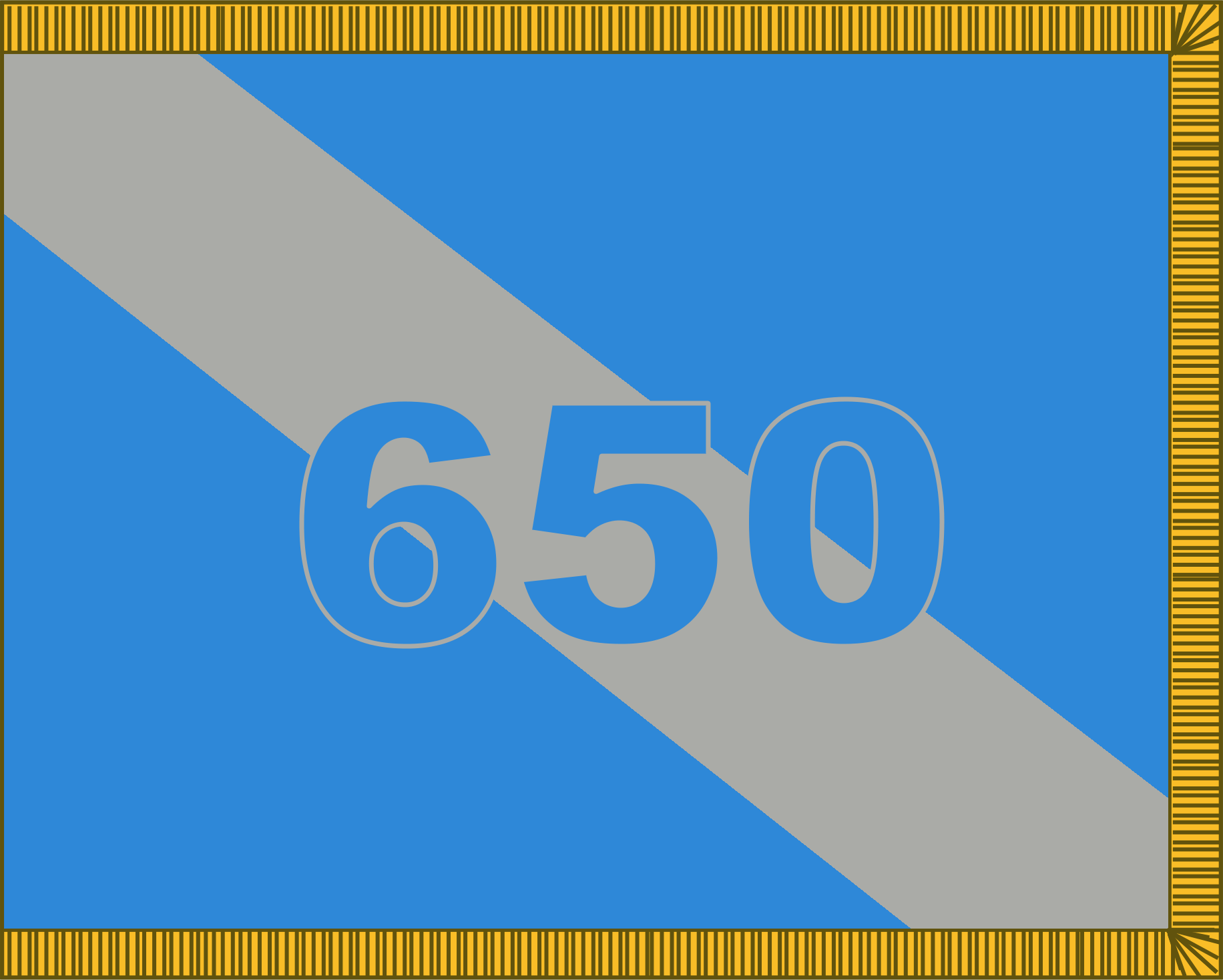
- 650th Military Intelligence Group Flag

The 650th Military Intelligence Group/Allied Command Counterintelligence is a unit of the US Army under the Supreme Headquarters Allied Powers Europe in Mons, Belgium. The unit was created in 1944 as a part of the Army of the United States as the 450th Counter Intelligence Corps Detachment in New Guinea and was deactivated in 1945. It earned two World War II campaign streamers for New Guinea and Luzon as well as a Philippine Presidential Unit Citation.

The unit was redesignated in the organized reserve in 1948 in Puerto Rico. It was again deactivated in 1949 and redesignated in the Regular Army at Fort Holabird, Maryland in 1951. It would be redesignated twice more before being reorganized as the 650th Military Intelligence Group in 1970.

The group has been stationed in Mons, Belgium as a part of SHAPE HQ since at least 1990.

The 650th MI Group/ACCI built and runs a Military Operations in Urban Terrain (MOUT) at Chièvres Air Base along with the Joint Multi-National Training Command (JMTC). During the Afghanistan War it helped train soldiers before deploying there with concepts like IED Lane.

== Subordinate Units ==
- Region I - Naples, Italy
- Region II - High Wycombe, United Kingdom
- Region IV - Brunssum, Netherlands
- Region V - SHAPE, Belgium
