= Roger Mortimer (racing) =

British soldier and horse-racing correspondent

Major Roger Francis Mortimer (22 November 1909 – November 1991), was an English horse-racing correspondent, Coldstream Guards officer, prisoner of war, and author.

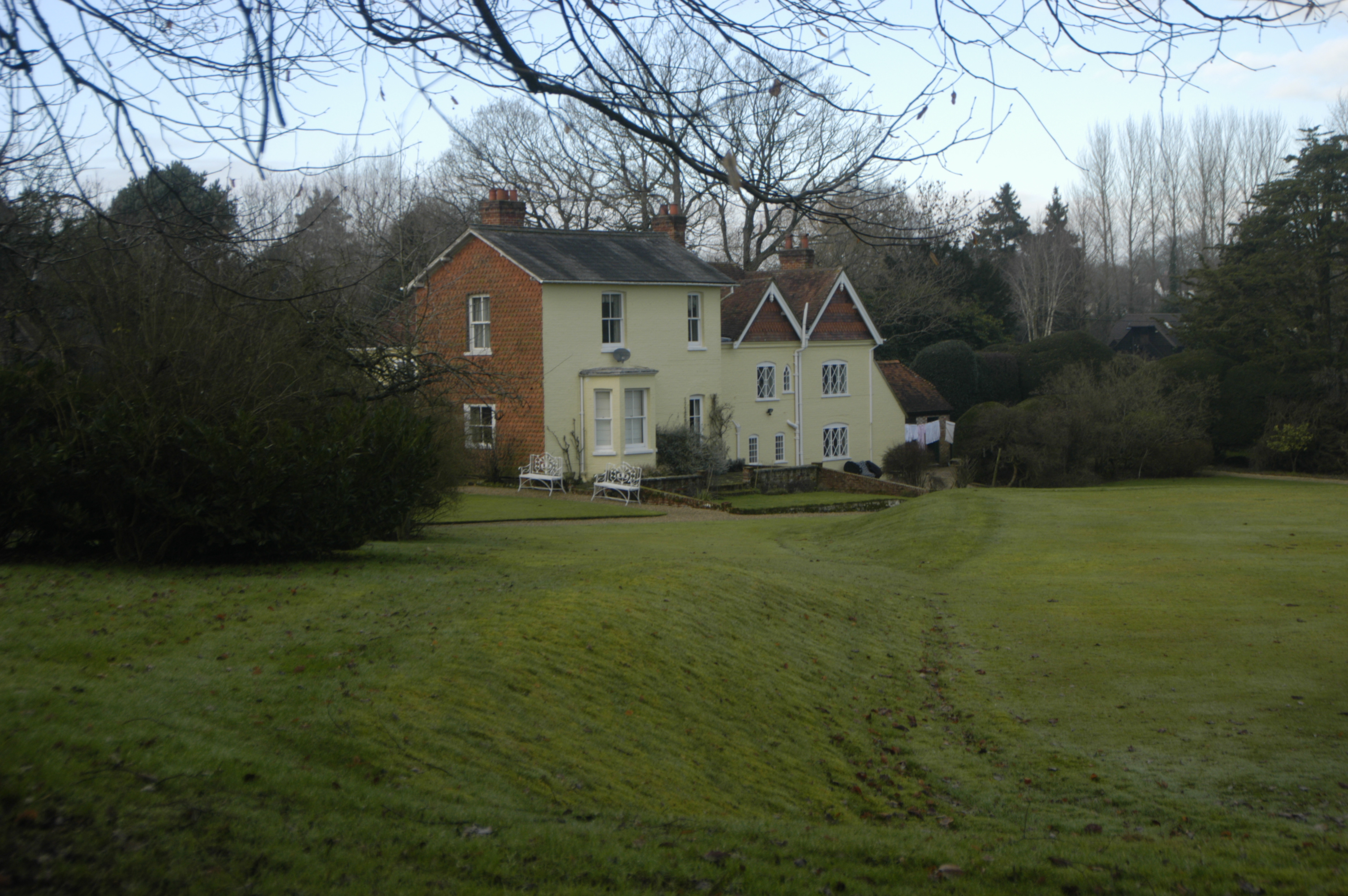
Roger Mortimer's home, 1967-1984.

Son of Haliburton Stanley Mortimer (1879-1957), of 11 Cadogan Gardens, Chelsea (a London stockbroker), and Dorothy Blackwell, of Crosse & Blackwell, he was educated at Ludgrove, Eton and Sandhurst, and joined the Coldstream Guards in 1930. He was a Captain at Dunkirk (BEF, 1940) but was captured unconscious, all his men having been killed. Sir Frederick Vernon Corfield, QC, PC, and Freddy Burnaby-Atkins were among his friends made as a prisoner of war (no. 481, in the various Oflags and Stalags). He left the army in 1947 having post-war served in Trieste, and took an appointment at Raceform.

For 29 years, from 1947-1975, he was the Sunday Times' racing correspondent (a.k.a. Fairway). He was succeeded by Brough Scott. He was also The Tote's PR and a racing reporter for BBC radio 2.

In 1947 Mortimer married Cynthia Sydney Denison-Pender, a niece of the 1st Lord Pender and granddaughter of Sir John Denison Denison-Pender, GBE, KCMG. Cynthia's sister Pamela had married General Sir Kenneth Thomas Darling, GBE, KCB, DSO, in 1941.

He was father of three: Jane Clare, Charles Roger Henry and Louise Star. His letters to them were published in 2012, 2013 and 2014. He lived at Budds Farm at Burghclere in Hampshire.

== Books ==
- Dearest Jane ...: My Father's Life and Letters, by Roger Mortimer and Jane Torday, Constable, 2014 (lacks an index and list of dramatis personae unlike her siblings' earlier volumes);
- Dear Lumpy by Roger Mortimer and Louise Mortimer, Constable & Robinson, 2013;
- Dear Lupin: Letters To A Wayward Son, by Roger Mortimer and Charlie Mortimer, Constable & Robinson, 2012. Hardback reached No 2 on The Sunday Times Bestseller list and sold in excess of 40,000 copies. Dear Lupin was BBC Radio 4's 'Book of the Week'. Sold over 120,000 copies in all formats.);
- The History of the Derby Stakes, Cassell (publisher) 1962 updated edition Michael Joseph, London, 1972;
- The Jockey Club, Cassell, London, 1958;
- Anthony Mildmay, MacGibbon & Kee, 1956;
- Twenty Great Horses, Cassell / Littlehampton Book Services Ltd, 1967;
- Twenty Great Horses of the British Turf, A. S. Barnes and Company, South Brunswick, NJ., 1968;
- The Flat: Flat racing in Britain since 1939, Allen and Unwin, 1979;
- Biographical Encyclopaedia of British Flat Racing, (Roger Mortimer, Richard Onslow, Peter Willet), MacDonald & Janes Ltd./ TBS The Book Service Ltd, London, 1978;
- Encyclopaedia of Flat Racing, Howard Wright & Roger Mortimer, Robert Hale, 1971 & 1986;
- Derby 200. The Official Story of the Blue Riband of the Turf, Michael Seth-Smith & Roger Mortimer, Guinness Superlatives, London, 1979.
- The Epsom Derby , Roger Mortimer with Tim Neligan, Michael Joseph, 1984.

== External ==
- The Spectator's review of Jane Torday's book
- Review in The Guardian
- Telegraph review
- John Karter: 'Mortimer: never at a loss for words', Mortimer's obituary in The Sunday Times, 1 December 1991
