= Frank Hastings Brooke =

British and Malaysian general

Yang Berbahagia Tan Sri Major General Frank Hastings Brooke CB CBE DSO PMN BSM

1st Chief of Defence Forces
- In office 1956–1959
- Succeeded by: Lt Gen Tan Sri Sir James Newton Rodney Moore

1st Chief of Army
- In office 1956–1959
- Succeeded by: Lt Gen Tan Sri Sir James Newton Rodney Moore
- Born: 18 March 1909; Eastern Cape, South Africa
- Died: 25 January 1982 (aged 72); Chichester, England
- Burial place: St. James Churchyard, West Sussex, England
- Education: Royal Military Academy Sandhurst
- Spouses: Helen Edith Mary Brooke (née Berkeley) (m. 1935; died 1973); Sheila Norah Brooke (née Carson) (m. 1974)
- Children: 2
- Relatives: Field Marshal Alan Brooke, 1st Viscount Alanbrooke (cousin)
- Military career
- Branch: British Army
- Service years: 1929–1969
- Rank: Major General
- Unit: Infantry
- Commands: Welch Regiment (as Colonel-in-Chief) (1965–1969); Malayan Armed Forces (1957–1959); Malaya Command (1957); Federation Army of Malaya (1956–1959); British Services Mission in Burma (as Deputy Commander) (1948–1956); 2nd Battalion, Monmouthshire Regiment (1944–1945)
- Known for: The first Chief of Army and the Chief of Defence Forces of Malaya (present-day Malaysia)
- Conflicts: Anglo-Afghan War; Mohmand campaign of 1935; Second World War; European theatre; Operation Overlord; Operation Epsom; Battle of the Falaise Gap; Operation Veritable; Cold War; Myanmar conflict; Malayan Emergency

Frank Hastings Brooke (18 March 1909 – 5 January 1982), was a South African-born British Army officer who served in numerous conflicts, including the Anglo-Afghan War, the Second World War and the Malayan Emergency. He is best known as the first Chief of the Army and the inaugural Chief of Defence Forces of the Federation of Malaya (present-day Malaysia).

== Early life and education ==
Frank Hastings Brooke was born on 18 March 1909 in the Eastern Cape, South Africa, to George Frank Brooke, a British Army officer (later Lieutenant Colonel) stationed in South Africa, and Theodora Olivia Brooke (née Jackson). He was related to the Viscount Brookeborough and was a cousin of Field Marshal Alan Francis Brooke, 1st Viscount Alanbrooke. Brooke spent his early life in South Africa and only travelled to the United Kingdom when he enrolled at the Royal Military Academy Sandhurst in the late 1920s. He was commissioned as a second lieutenant in 1929.

On 23 October 1935, Brooke married Helen Edith Mary Berkeley, the daughter of Major Rupert Edric Gifford and Maude Berkeley, at St Mary and All Saints Church in Beaconsfield, Buckinghamshire. The couple had two sons: George Hugo Hastings Brooke (later Major), born in 1936, and Nigel Francis Brooke, born in 1937. Following the death of his first wife in January 1973, Brooke remarried in September 1974 to Sheila Norah Carson.

== Military career ==
=== Service on the North-West Frontier ===
After graduating from the Royal Military Academy Sandhurst, Brooke was commissioned as a second lieutenant into the 1st Battalion, Welch Regiment, where he was posted to the North-West Frontier Province (present-day Pakistan). The most significant engagement he participated in during this period was the Mohmand campaign of 1935. He spent much of his early military career in this region.

=== Return to the United Kingdom ===
In 1937, he was promoted to the rank of captain and appointed Aide-de-Camp to the Governor of Northern Ireland. He held this position for two years, from 1937 to 1938. With the onset of the Second World War, Brooke volunteered for an active combat role.

=== Second World War ===
As hostilities in Europe escalated into full-scale war, Brooke was assigned to the 2nd Battalion, Monmouthshire Regiment, which had recently transitioned from an anti-aircraft role to an infantry unit. The battalion formed part of the 160th (Welsh) Brigade within the 53rd (Welsh) Infantry Division, which was tasked with home defence in the event of a German invasion. The unit underwent training in Northern Ireland and was deployed along the United Kingdom's borders.

In 1941, the division was selected to participate in Operation Overlord. Units under its command, including Brooke's battalion, were transferred to South East England to undertake intensive amphibious warfare training. In 1944, Brooke was promoted to lieutenant colonel and appointed commanding officer of the 2nd Battalion, Monmouthshire Regiment. He led the battalion during the Normandy landings and continued in command through the European campaign until Germany's surrender in May 1945.

=== Post-war service in Burma ===
Following the war, Brooke was promoted to colonel in 1948 and appointed Deputy Commander of the British Services Mission in Burma. This mission, the successor to Burma Command, was responsible for assisting the newly independent Union of Burma and monitoring the developing internal conflicts within the country.

=== Service in Malaya ===
In 1954, Brooke was promoted to brigadier and on 11 July 1956 he was posted to Malaya, where he assumed the role of General Officer Commanding the Federation of Malaya Army. His primary responsibility was to support the federal government in establishing its own military capability during the transition from colonial rule to national self-defence. During his tenure, significant groundwork was laid for the formation of the future Malayan Armed Forces, including the adoption of military customs and traditions.

In 1957, he was appointed the final General Officer Commanding of Malaya Command. Following Malaya's independence on 31 August 1957, Brooke was promoted to major general and asked to remain in command of the Federation of Malaya Army, now officially known as the Malayan Army (present-day Malaysian Army). At the same time, the Malaya Command was reorganised into the Malayan Armed Forces (present-day Malaysian Armed Forces), making Brooke the first Chief of the Army and the first Chief of Defence Forces of the Federation of Malaya. He held both posts until 25 October 1959.

=== Final years of service and retirement ===
Brooke returned to the United Kingdom in 1959, where he served in various staff appointments at the War Office. In 1963, he was appointed Chief Army Lecturer at the Imperial Defence College, a position he held for six years. In 1965, he was also appointed ceremonial Colonel-in-Chief of the Welch Regiment, his original regiment. He retired from the British Army in 1969, resigning from both his academic and ceremonial roles.

== Later life and death ==
Following his retirement from the military, Brooke lived a quiet life in South East England. He purchased Westbury House in Hampshire, where he resided until the death of his first wife, Helen Edith Mary Berkeley, in 1973. After remarrying in 1974, he relocated to Chichester, West Sussex.

Brooke died on 25 January 1982 at his home in Chichester. He was buried at St. James' Churchyard in West Sussex, England.

== Honours and awards ==
Brooke had a distinguished military career, marked by his involvement in several major conflicts. For his service in the North-West Frontier Province (present-day Pakistan), he was awarded the Distinguished Service Order. In recognition of his contribution to the European theatre during the Second World War, he received the Bronze Star Medal from the United States.

On 22 October 1954, he was appointed a Commander of the Most Excellent Order of the British Empire (CBE) by the United Kingdom for distinguished services in Malaya. In the Queen's Birthday Honours list on 12 June 1958, Frank Hastings Brooke was appointed a Companion of the Order of the Bath (CB) in the Military Division, in recognition of his service throughout his military career.

On 16 August 1958, he was also one of eight recipients of the Commander of the Order of the Defender of the Realm (PMN) conferred by the Yang di-Pertuan Agong. This Malaysian federal award, which carries the honorific title "Tan Sri", was bestowed in recognition of his role as the first Chief of the Army and the first Chief of Defence Forces of independent Malaya.

The following is a list of his decorations and honours:

Honours of the United Kingdom

- Companion of the Order of the Bath (CB) (12 June 1958)
- Commander of the Order of the British Empire (CBE) (22 October 1954)
- Distinguished Service Order (DSO) (c. 1937)
- War Medal 1939–1945 (c. 1945)
- King George V Silver Jubilee Medal (6 May 1935)
- King George VI Coronation Medal (12 May 1937)

Honours of the United States

- Bronze Star Medal (BSM) (c. 1944)

Honours of Malaysia

- Commander of the Order of the Defender of the Realm (PMN) – Tan Sri (16 August 1958)
