= Margaret Barber =

English Christian writer 1869–1901

Margaret Fairless Barber (pseudonym, Michael Fairless; 7 May 1869 – 24 August 1901), was an English Christian writer. Her book of meditations, The Roadmender (1902), became a popular classic.

== Life ==
Barber was born in Rastrick, Brighouse, West Riding of Yorkshire, the youngest of three daughters. She was initially tutored at home by her mother, Maria Louisa, née Musgrave (1831–1890) and elder sisters. As a child, Barber was an avid reader of Charles Dickens, Walter Scott and books on natural history. Her father, solicitor and amateur archaeologist Fairless Barber, died in 1881, and her mother, unable to cope, sent her to relatives in Torquay where she attended a local school. It was here that she became aware of a spinal condition that would affect the rest of her life. She settled with her mother in Bungay, Suffolk.

In 1884, Barber went to London to train as a nurse at a children's hospital. She also travelled to Torquay to care for a relative and did charitable work in the East End of London. However, her health continued to deteriorate, including her sight and she was in continual need of care herself. To the dismay of her relatives, she was effectively "adopted" by the cultured Dowson family who took care of her in their family home.

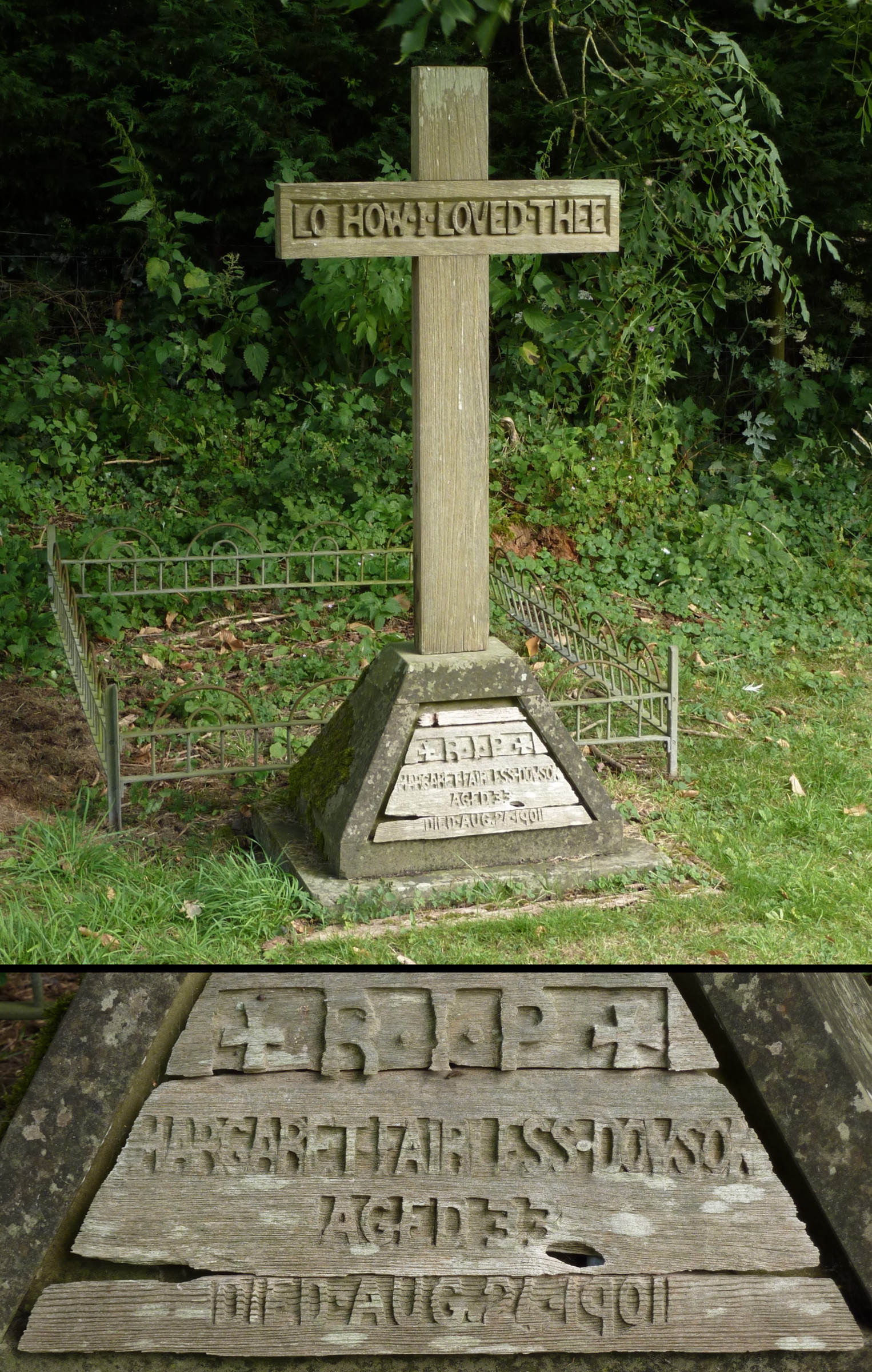
Margaret Barber's grave at St James' Church in Ashurst, West Sussex, photographed in 2014

Unable to continue her charitable work, Barber took up writing. She published under the pseudonym "Michael Fairless", the "Michael" inspired by her childhood friend Michael McDonnell (1882–1956), subsequently chief justice of the British Mandate of Palestine. As her health worsened, she switched from writing with her right hand to using her left hand, and later used dictation. Her first book was the religious romance The Gathering of Brother Hilarius (1901). It was The Roadmender (1902) that achieved a wild success, being reprinted 31 times in 10 years. A posthumous work, The Grey Brethren, was issued in 1905. It consisted of a number of fragments and short fairy tales, intended for juvenile readers; included among them were, A German Christmas Eve, The Manifestation, The Dreadful Griffin, The Discontented Daffodils, and The Fairy Fluffikins.

Barber died in Henfield, West Sussex while on vacation with the Dowsons. She is buried in nearby Ashurst. Her epitaph reads "Lo how I loved Thee".

== Bibliography ==
- A. Room (2004), "Barber, Margaret Fairless (1869–1901)", Oxford Dictionary of National Biography, Oxford University Press, accessed 2 July 2007 (subscription, Wikipedia Library access or UK public library membership required)
- W. S. Palmer, [M. E. Dowson] & A. M. Haggard, A. M.(1913) Michael Fairless: Her Life and Writings
- M. E. Dowson (1931) "A biographical note" in The complete works of Michael Fairless
- "The Tramp" [A. H. Anderson] (1924), The Roadmender's Country
- A. Wilde (1938), "A Pilgrimage to the Roadmender Country: Memories of Michael Fairless", Sussex Daily News, 25 February 1938
