= Wonderful Christmastime =

1979 Christmas song by Paul McCartney

- Original single sleeve

Single by Paul McCartney
- B-side: "Rudolph the Red-Nosed Reggae (Instrumental)"
- Released: 16 November 1979
- Recorded: June–July 1979
- Studio: Lower Gate Farm, Peasmarsh, East Sussex; Spirit of Ranachan, Campbeltown, Scotland
- Genre: Christmas; synth-pop
- Length: 3:45: 4:18 (unedited version)
- Label: Parlophone; Columbia
- Songwriter: Paul McCartney
- Producer: Paul McCartney

Paul McCartney singles chronology
"Eat at Home" (1971)	"Wonderful Christmastime" (1979)	"Coming Up" (1980)

Music video
- "Wonderful Christmastime" on YouTube

"Wonderful Christmastime" is a Christmas song by the English musician Paul McCartney. He recorded it alone during sessions for his third solo album McCartney II (1980). First released as a single in November 1979, it was his first single as a solo artist in eight years, although it later featured on reissues of McCartney II and his band Wings' final album Back to the Egg (1979). It is a synth-pop track driven by synthesisers. The song was supported by a music video featuring McCartney and the members of Wings rejoicing.

"Wonderful Christmastime" reached the top 10 in numerous European countries but only charted on the US Billboard Hot 100 decades later. Music critics gave the song a negative response on release, and it remains deeply polarising. While some criticise its repetitive lyrics, rhythm, synth sound, and superficiality, some argue that it spreads holiday cheer well and praise its silly nature; McCartney said in 2012 and 2022 that he was trying to capture the amusing, party spirit of Christmas. The song has become a Christmas staple and continues to receive extensive airplay during the holiday season. It has been covered by numerous artists, including Diana Ross, Hilary Duff, Straight No Chaser and Kylie Minogue.

== Background and recording ==
Paul McCartney conceived "Wonderful Christmastime" during the sessions for his experimental album McCartney II (1980). He was partially inspired by the Christmas records he had recorded with the Beatles. In a 1980 interview, he said that since his days in the Beatles, his primary goal was to achieve a Christmas number one. He found himself in the middle of a hot day in June or July and decided to record an impromptu Christmas song, finding the idea "ridiculous" and "ironic". Recording took place at McCartney's newly purchased Lower Gate Farm in Peasmarsh, East Sussex, and the Spirit of Ranachan Studio in Campbeltown, Scotland.

When recording "Wonderful Christmastime", McCartney used every track on his Studer A80 16-track machine, filling them with drums (bass and snare), electric guitar, lead vocals and backing vocals, synthesisers and sleigh bells. A Yamaha CS-80 synthesiser created what authors Allan Kozinn and Adrian Sinclair describe as a "bouncy" and "festive" backing track. The echoing bass notes and chords heard at the beginning of the song establish a motif. McCartney played and arranged all the instruments himself, and he recalled that it "was good fun to make". In a 1979 interview, he said Christmas was about "parties" and "good humour" between people: "So, the song's just basically about [that]. It's very simple." Commentators have labelled it as synth-pop.

Mixing took place in October 1979 at Abbey Road Studios in London. On 14 October, McCartney cut "Wonderful Christmastime" from 4:18 to 3:49 for release as a single. For its B-side, he chose "Rudolph the Red-Nosed Reggae", an instrumental remake of "Rudolph the Red-Nosed Reindeer", originally recorded on 12 May 1975.

== Release ==
A still from the promotional film

"Wonderful Christmastime" was released as a non-album single on 16 November 1979 in the United Kingdom and on 20 November in the United States. It was the first single credited solely to McCartney since "Another Day" in 1971. The single's picture sleeve depicts Paul wearing a Santa Claus hat. Although the members of McCartney's band Wings are not on the recording, they appear in the accompanying music video, which was filmed at the Fountain Inn in Ashurst, West Sussex. Directed by Russell Mulcahy, the video depicts McCartney and his bandmates celebrating the song's festive message. It also includes footage shot at the Hippodrome Theatre, where McCartney and Wings rehearsed for their 1979 UK tour. McCartney said of the video: "The video was great, too: we went out to some pub somewhere, and so that was a laugh... we just ran out of the pub occasionally, filmed a bit, and then went back in the pub."

Wings performed the song throughout the UK tour, during which they recreated the Christmas atmosphere with falling snowflakes. Afterwards, McCartney retired "Wonderful Christmastime" from live shows until 2009; he performed it during pre-Christmas concerts for the next nine years. He also gave a performance during an appearance on Saturday Night Live on 15 December 2012.

"Wonderful Christmastime" reached number six on the UK singles chart. In the US, it reached number 83 on the Cash Box Top 100 chart and number 94 on the Record World Singles Chart but did not make the Billboard Hot 100 chart immediately. It first appeared on a Billboard music chart in December 1984, staying at number 10 for two weeks on the special Christmas Singles chart. Its next appearance on a Billboard chart came in January 1996, when it both debuted and reached number 29 on the weekly Hot Adult Contemporary chart. "Wonderful Christmastime" debuted on the main Billboard Hot 100 chart in December 2018, at number 47. It reached number 26 on the week of 6 January 2024.

"Wonderful Christmastime" and "Rudolph the Red-Nosed Reggae" were included on reissues of McCartney II and on the 1993 reissue of Wings' final album Back to the Egg; the 2011 deluxe edition of McCartney II also featured the full-length version of "Wonderful Christmastime". The single was also included on The 7" Singles Box in 2022. Furthermore, "Wonderful Christmastime" has featured on the 2001 compilation album Now That's What I Call Christmas! and on several of its follow-up compilations.

== Reception and legacy ==
"Wonderful Christmastime" received negative reviews from music critics on release. Melody Maker's Chris Bohn called it "a sloppy, poorly-executed song" that the other members of Wings, he believed, were "undoubtedly too proud to associate themselves with". In the NME, Nick Kent wrote that the song surpasses "Mary Had a Little Lamb" (1972) as McCartney's worst ever recording, deeming it a "grotesquely twee piece of festive nose-scrapings" that makes "Mull of Kintyre" (1977) sound like John Coltrane's "Naima" (1960). Robin Smith of Record Mirror similarly called it a "tarnished tinsel" song that was "just awful". Writing for Smash Hits, David Hepworth said of the song: "It's simple, catchy, clever and thoroughly nauseating."

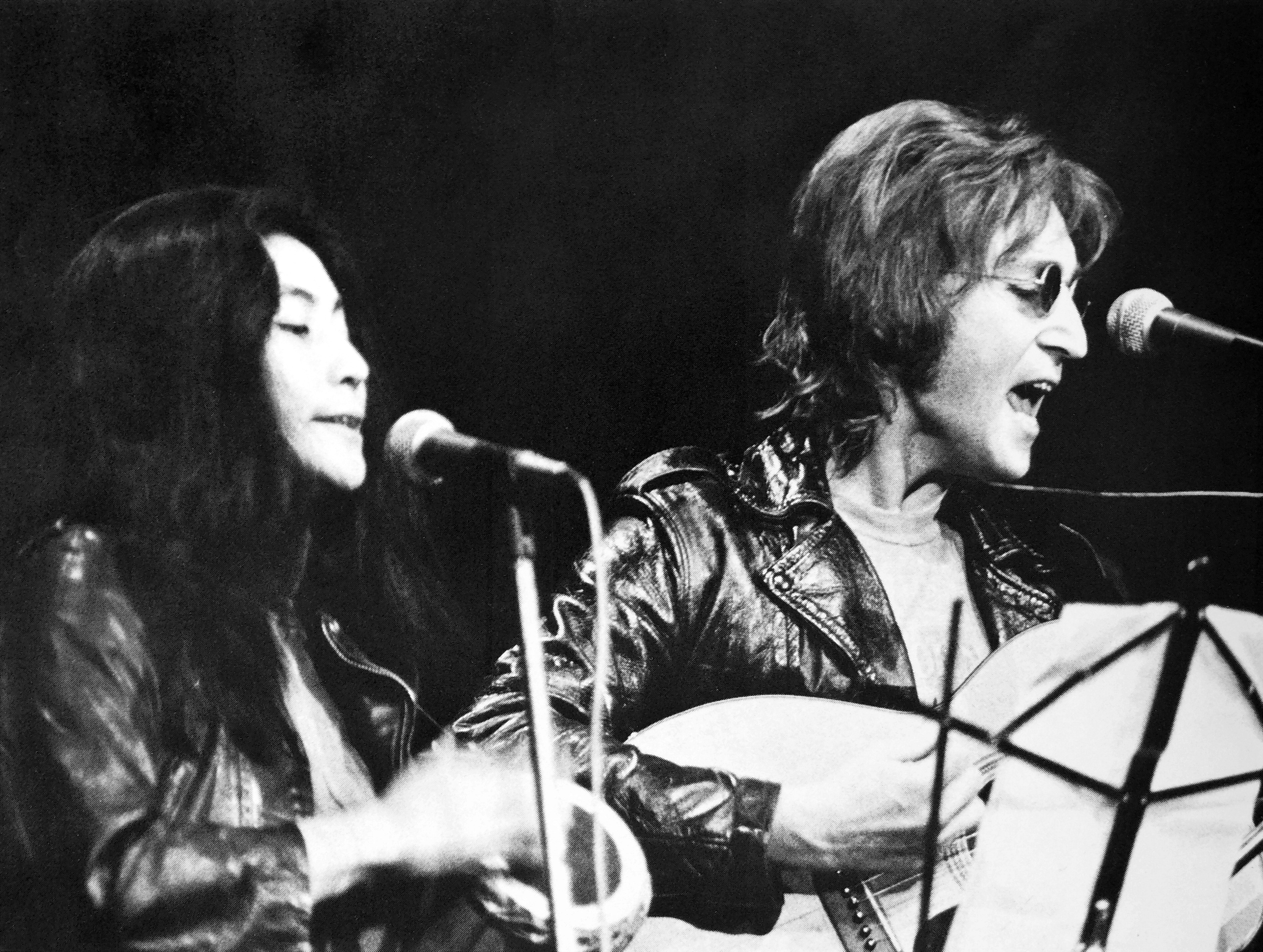
Yoko Ono and John Lennon in 1971; "Wonderful Christmastime" has been compared to their song "Happy Xmas (War Is Over)".

Decades on, "Wonderful Christmastime" is seen as one of the most polarising Christmas songs; it frequently appears on lists compiling the worst Christmas songs but has also made lists of the best Christmas songs. Some writers also consider it one of McCartney's most mediocre compositions. Many listeners criticise its repetition and style, while others enjoy its "fun, feel-good energy".

In his book The Paul McCartney Catalog (2020), Ted Montgomery derides the instrumentation as "amateurish and banal", especially the overused synthesisers, and finds the lyrics "embarrassing". Composer and musicologist Nate Sloan argues that while it stands amongst the worst pop songs of the late 1970s, it excels as a Christmas song. Other musicologists have criticised its repetitive lyrics, rhythm and structure; Nate Sloan, for instance, says "it moves through the verse section of the song faster than a sleigh with no brakes". Matt Springer of Ultimate Classic Rock writes that the song "exemplifie[s] the worst synth excesses of an entire decade [the 1980s]" and pesteringly repeats the same "three lines of melody". Others have said its production makes it feel dated; Beatles author Robert Rodriguez, for example, thinks the synthesiser guilty of "instantly [dating] the song" to the late 1970s. "Wonderful Christmastime" has been unfavourably compared to John Lennon and Yoko Ono's Christmas song "Happy Xmas (War Is Over)" (1971), although some prefer the former to the latter. Authors Philip Norman and Howard Sounes said it lacked substance like tinsel, while John Blaney called the song a "letdown" that lacks the "joie de vivre" of "Merry Xmas Everybody" (1973) by Slade, the "seasonal good cheer" of "I Wish It Could Be Christmas Everyday" (1973) by Wizzard, and the "universality" of Lennon's "Happy Xmas". He also described "Rudolph the Red-Nosed Reggae" as the "nadir of McCartney's career".

Nevertheless, the song has its defenders. Author Luca Perasi argues that it has garnered retrospective acclaim "just like any other iconic ex-Beatle song". Critic and writer Annie Zaleski is a supporter. In her book This Is Christmas, Song by Song: The Stories Behind 100 Holiday Hits (2023), she writes: "I think it speaks to Paul McCartney's strength... his ability to sort of cover this wide spectrum from serious to really fun and whimsical." She and some other writers believe that the song's opponents dislike that it came from a songwriter who is known for writing deep, meaningful songs. Allison Rapp of Ultimate Classic Rock agrees, noting how the same songwriter who wrote emotional tracks like "Yesterday" (1965), "Hey Jude" (1968) and "Maybe I'm Amazed" (1970) wrote silly ones such as "Maxwell's Silver Hammer" (1969), "When I'm Sixty-Four" (1967) and "Uncle Albert/Admiral Halsey" (1971). Rapp ultimately states: "If you like the Beatles and you like Paul McCartney, then you understand that spectrum has been in place for years."

In Paste magazine, Matt Mitchell makes the case that as a Christmas song, it should not be viewed in the same way as "Hey Jude" or "The Long and Winding Road" (1970), as its purpose is to spread whimsy and senselessness suiting the holiday. Vice's Andrew Winistorfer similarly attests that "Wonderful Christmastime", like all Christmas songs, is "cheesy" and "doesn't have to be stone serious". He further argues that it proves McCartney is a great songwriter, able to successfully write deep and silly songs, while also crediting it as one of the first chillwave songs. Ultimate Classic Rock's Matthew Wilkening thinks it successfully captures and spreads holiday cheer without mentioning politics, religion or romance; thus, everyone can appreciate it.

Summarising its polarising nature, Rodriguez wrote: "Love it or hate it, few songs within the McCartney oeuvre have provoked such strong reactions." In a 2022 interview with PaulMcCartney.com, McCartney stated:

I like the idea of Christmas songs purely because they only come around at Christmas! They remind us of the fun atmosphere of the whole season, and when I was writing 'Wonderful Christmastime' I was trying to capture that party aspect. I did hope it would keep coming back – which it has. Sometimes people will go into a shop and hear it a little too much, but I don't care! I'm happy!

He discussed his feelings about it in a 2012 NME article:

For a while it sort of got on my nerves, that song – something like that will, because it gets played a lot. I go on and off a few of my songs, and I think 'It's not really that good', but then what will happen is other people will like it, and I then re-evaluate through other people’s eyes. I go, '... what are they seeing in it?’ And then eventually I’ll go, 'Oh yeah, that’s what I wanted it to be'. ... It really is just a drinking song. If we’re playing somewhere around Christmas, we always wheel that one out. And when I go back to it now, I think, yeah, this is pretty cool.

Despite its critical reception, "Wonderful Christmastime" has become a holiday staple and continues to receive substantial festive airplay every year. Including royalties from other versions and uses, Forbes suggested in 2010 that McCartney makes between $400,000 and $600,000 USD a year from the song, which puts its cumulative earnings at over $15 million. Two years later, the NME wrote that he earns $250,000 a year in royalties.

== Cover versions ==
"Wonderful Christmastime" has been covered by numerous artists since its release. These include Diana Ross in 1994 on the album A Very Special Season and Hilary Duff in 2002 on her debut album Santa Claus Lane. In 2013, a cappella group Straight No Chaser recorded a cover with McCartney for their EP Under the Influence: Holiday Edition. Three years later, Kylie Minogue and British singer-songwriter Mika covered the song for the Snow Queen Edition of Minogue's Kylie's Christmas album. Minogue and Mika performed the song on the Italian television programme Stasera Casa Mika on 6 December 2016; the resulting single charted at number 23 in Belgium.

Also in 2016, McCartney, Jimmy Fallon and the Roots sang a new version for the compilation album Holidays Rule Vol. 2; they had previously sang their take on The Tonight Show, with the cast of the film Sing (2016) providing backing vocals. In 2018, the Monkees recorded a rendition sung by Micky Dolenz for the album Christmas Party. Reviewing the album for The Guardian, Michael Hann said the Monkees' cover "highlights the simple good nature of the song". In 2023, a version by American gospel singer Blessing Offor reached number one on the Billboard Christian Airplay and Christian Adult Contemporary charts.

== Personnel ==
According to Luca Perasi:

- Paul McCartney – vocals, backing vocals, synthesisers, electric guitars, drums, sleigh bells, production

== Charts ==
Weekly chart performance for "Wonderful Christmastime"
Chart (1979–2025)	Peak position
Australia (ARIA)	23
Austria (Ö3 Austria Top 40)	10
Belgium (Ultratop 50 Flanders)	26
Canada Hot 100 (Billboard)	17
Croatia International Airplay (Top lista)	16
Czech Republic Singles Digital (ČNS IFPI)	43
Denmark (Tracklisten)	30
Europe (European Hot 100 Singles)	12
France (SNEP)	151
Germany (GfK)	7
Global 200 (Billboard)	15
Greece International (IFPI) 2011 remaster	35
Hungary (Single Top 40)	25
Hungary (Stream Top 40)	8
Ireland (IRMA)	6
Italy (FIMI)	68
Japan (Oricon)	69
Latvia (LaIPA)	10
Lithuania (AGATA) 2011 remaster	25
Luxembourg (Billboard)	17
Norway (VG-lista)	7
Netherlands (Single Top 100)	10
New Zealand (Recorded Music NZ)	20
Poland Airplay (ZPAV)	35
Poland (Polish Streaming Top 100)	26
Portugal (AFP)	34
Slovakia Singles Digital (ČNS IFPI)	32
Sweden (Sverigetopplistan)	13
Switzerland (Schweizer Hitparade)	15
UK Singles (Official Charts)	6
US (Billboard Hot 100)	26
US Adult Contemporary (Billboard)	29
US Adult Pop Airplay (Billboard)	32
US Holiday 100 (Billboard)	15
US Cash Box Top 100	83
US Rolling Stone Top 100	21

== Certifications ==
Region	Certification	Certified units/sales
Australia (ARIA)	Gold	35,000^{‡}
Denmark (IFPI Danmark)	Platinum	90,000^{‡}
Germany (BVMI)	Platinum	600,000^{‡}
New Zealand (RMNZ)	Platinum	30,000^{‡}
United Kingdom (BPI)	3× Platinum	1,800,000^{‡}
Streaming
Greece (IFPI Greece) 2011 remaster	Gold	1,000,000^{†}
^{‡} Sales+streaming figures based on certification alone.^{†} Streaming-only figures based on certification alone.
