= Malek Razak Sulaiman =

24th Malaysian Chief of Defence Force

Yang Berbahagia General Tan Sri Malek Razak Sulaiman PGAT PMN SPMP SPKK SSPK SPTS PSAT PGDK PAT KAT AMK BCK PJK PPS PPA PJM
- مالك رزاق سليمان
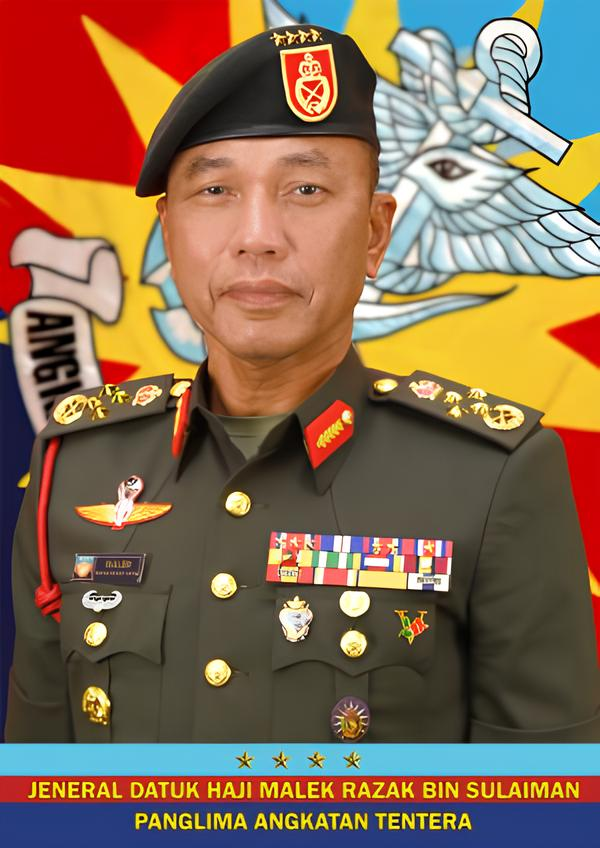
- Official portrait, 2026

24th Chief of the Defence Forces
- Incumbent
- Assumed office 1 February 2026
- Monarch: Ibrahim
- Prime Minister: Anwar Ibrahim
- Minister: Mohamed Khaled Nordin
- Preceded by: Zulhelmy Ithnain (acting)

Personal details
- Born: Malek Razak bin Sulaiman; 24 March 1967 (age 59) Batu Pahat, Johor, Malaysia
- Spouse: Siti Juana Md Ibrahim
- Children: 3
- Education: Royal Military College; National University of Malaysia (Dip, MSc); King's College London (MA)
- Occupation: Military officer

Military service
- Allegiance: Malaysia
- Branch/service: Malaysian Army
- Years of service: 1987–present
- Rank: General
- Unit: Royal Malay Regiment
- Commands: Chief of Defence Force; Western Field Army; 5th Infantry Division; 2nd Infantry Brigade; 25th Battalion, Royal Malay Regiment
- Battles/wars: Second Malayan Emergency

Malek Razak bin Sulaiman (Jawi: مالك رزاق بن سليمان; born 24 March 1967) is a Malaysian military officer who has served as the 24th Chief of the Defence Forces since 1 February 2026. Previously, he served as the Army Western Field Commander of the Malaysian Army.

== Early life and education ==
Malek Razak bin Sulaiman was born in Batu Pahat, Johor, Malaysia. He holds a Diploma in Strategy and Security from Universiti Kebangsaan Malaysia (UKM), a Master of Arts in Defence Studies from King’s College London, and a Master of Social Science (Defence Studies) from UKM.

== Military career (1985–present) ==
Malek Razak joined the Malaysian Army as an Overseas Officer Cadet at the Royal Military College, Sandhurst in the United Kingdom in 1985 and he was commissioned as a Second Lieutenant on 11 December 1987. He later began his career as a platoon commander at the 21st Battalion, Royal Malay Regiment.

Malek Razak held various key command positions in the Malaysian Army, primarily in infantry units within the Western Field Army, which includes being the Commanding Officer of the 25th Battalion, Royal Malay Regiment, the Brigade Commander of the 2nd Infantry Brigade and the Division Commander of the 5th Infantry Division. His expertise in operations and training operations was later strengthened through his appointments at headquarters-level commands such as the Assistant Chief of Staff, Army Operations and Training and the Assistant Chief of Staff, Defence Operations and Training, Malaysian Armed Forces Headquarters before being entrusted as the Commander of the Western Field Army of the Malaysian Army.

On 1 February 2026, Malek Razak was promoted from the rank Lieutenant-General to a full General upon his appointment as the 24th Chief of the Malaysian Armed Forces, thus assuming the highest responsibility to lead the Malaysian Armed Forces. His appointment to the post was seen as an aim to revive public trust in the military and uphold institutional credibility while navigating through a complex security landscape. He also vowed to enforce a "total clean up" in the military and would not tolerate any forms of breaches in his leadership.

== Personal life ==
Malek Razak is married to Siti Juana binti Md Ibrahim and they have three children. He enjoys reading, playing sports and practicing a healthy lifestyle.

== Honours ==
=== Honours of Malaysia ===
- Malaysia
  - Commander of the Order of the Defender of the Realm (PMN) – Tan Sri (2026)
  - Recipient of the Loyal Service Medal (PPS)
  - Recipient of the General Service Medal (PPA)
  - Recipient of the 15th Yang di-Pertuan Agong Installation Medal (2017)
  - Recipient of the 16th Yang di-Pertuan Agong Installation Medal (2019)
  - Recipient of the 17th Yang di-Pertuan Agong Installation Medal
- Malaysian Armed Forces
  - Courageous Commander of the Most Gallant Order of Military Service (PGAT) (2026)
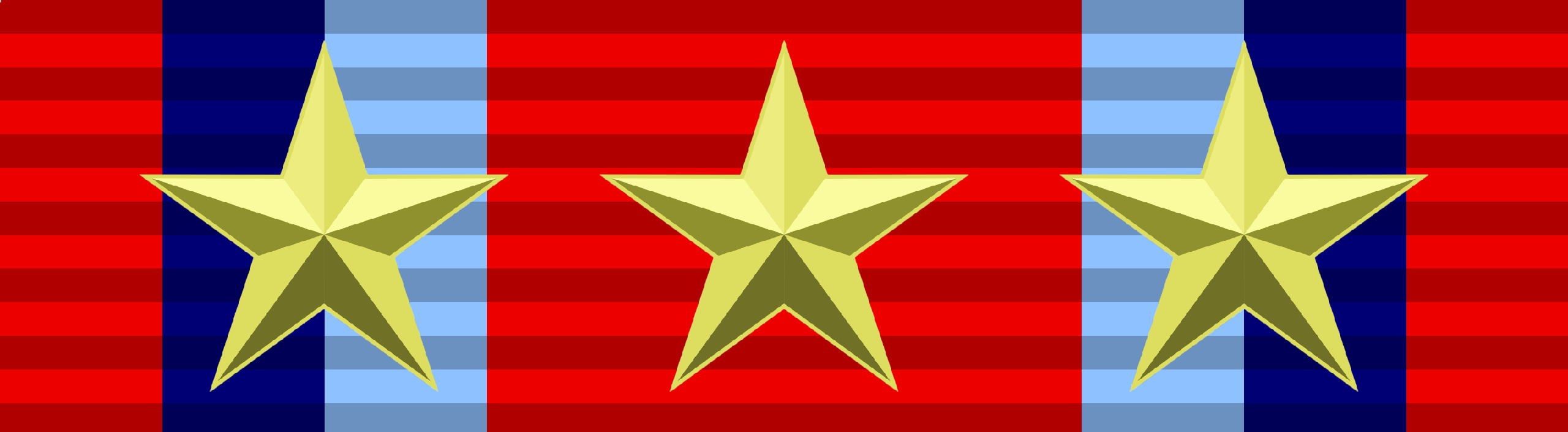
  - Loyal Commander of the Most Gallant Order of Military Service (PSAT)
  - Warrior of the Most Gallant Order of Military Service (PAT)
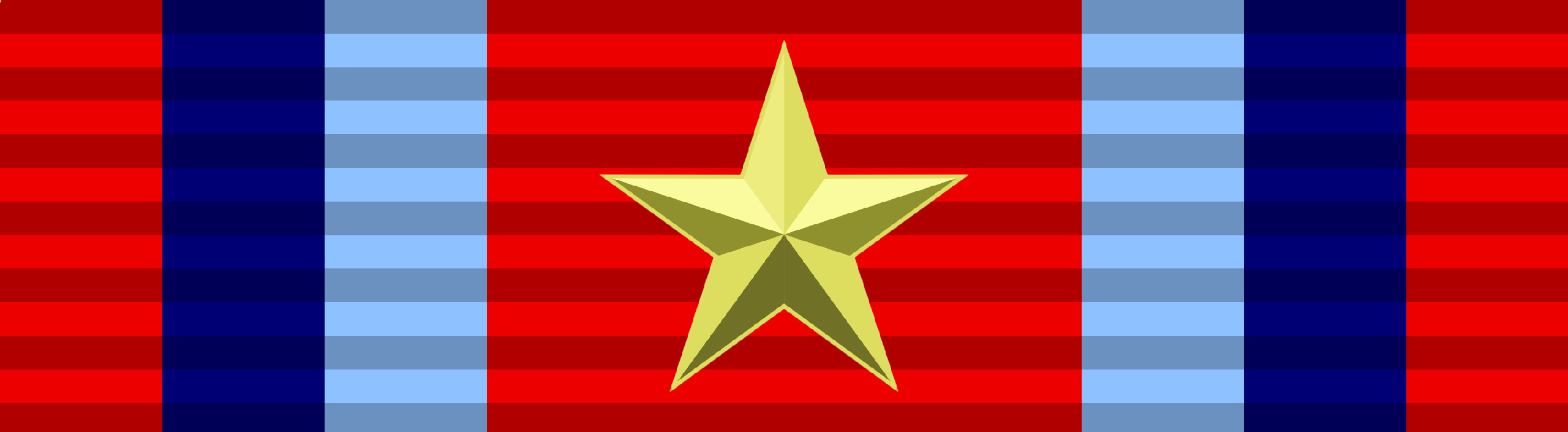
  - Officer of the Most Gallant Order of Military Service (KAT)
  - Recipient of the Malaysian Service Medal (PJM)
- Kedah
  - Knight Grand Commander of the Glorious Order of the Loyal Warrior of Kedah (SSPK) – Dato' Seri Pahlawan (2026)
  - Member of the Order of the Crown of Kedah (AMK) (2014)
  - Recipient of the State of Kedah Distinguished Service Star (BCK) (2003)
  - Recipient of the Meritorious Service Medal (PJK)
- Kelantan
  - Knight Grand Commander of the Order of the Noble Crown of Kelantan (SPKK) – Dato' (2026)
- Perak
  - Knight Grand Commander of the Order of Taming Sari (SPTS) – Dato' Seri Panglima (2026)
- Perlis
  - Knight Grand Commander of the Order of the Crown of Perlis (SPMP) – Dato' Seri (2026)
- Sabah
  - Commander of the Order of Kinabalu (PGDK) – Datuk (2023)

=== Foreign honours ===
- United Kingdom
  - Recipient of the Sandhurst Medal
