= 29th Infantry Brigade (United Kingdom) =

- Formation badge of the brigade.
- Active: 1914–1945; 1950–1956
- Country: United Kingdom
- Branch: British Army
- Type: Infantry formation
- Size: Brigade
- Nickname: "Frozen Arsehole"
- Engagements: First World War: Gallipoli Campaign; Sinai and Palestine Campaign; Second World War: Battle of Madagascar; Burma Campaign; Korean War: Third Battle of Seoul; Battle of the Imjin River

Commanders
- Notable commanders: Sir Oliver Leese; Sir Francis Festing

The 29th Infantry Brigade was an infantry brigade unit of the British Army. It was originally raised in 1914 and saw service during the First and Second World Wars and the Korean War.

== First World War ==
The 29th Brigade was formed in August 1914 as part of the 10th (Irish) Division, of the first wave of Kitchener's Army (K1). The division and brigade transferred to Lemnos in July 1915 in preparation for the Gallipoli landings. The 29th Infantry Brigade landed at Anzac Cove on 6/7 August the same year, participating in the Battle of Chunuk Bair. The 10th (Irish) Division was withdrawn from Gallipoli to Salonika at the end of September 1915, elements of the division participating in actions at Karajakois, Yenikoi and Kosturino. In early September 1917, the Division was withdrawn to Egypt and took part in the Palestine Campaign where it fought in the third Battle of Gaza. The division moved back to Cairo at the end of the war.

== Second World War ==
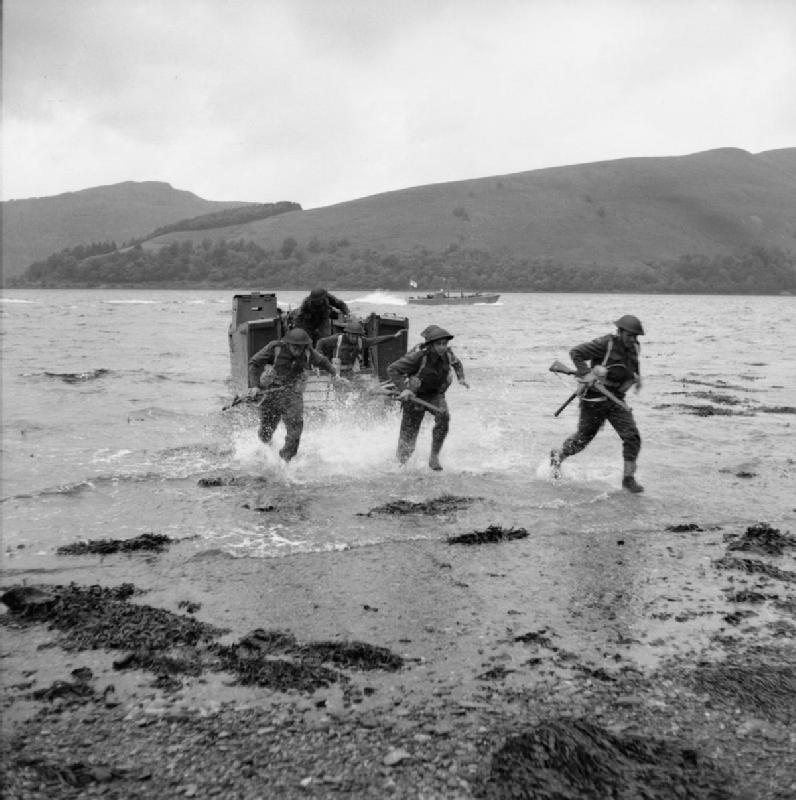
Troops rushing ashore from a landing craft during combined operations training by 29th Infantry Brigade Group at Loch Fyne, Argyllshire.

In the Second World War, the Cairo Brigade (a Regular Army force stationed in Egypt) was renamed as the 29th Infantry Brigade on 20 September 1939. In October 1939, it was redesignated as the 22nd Infantry Brigade.

On 14 July 1940, a new 29th Independent Infantry Brigade Group, under the command of Brigadier Sir Oliver Leese, was formed in the United Kingdom from Regular Army infantry battalions. It was successively under command of XII Corps, the West Sussex County Division, IV Corps and South Eastern Command before passing to War Office Control in May 1941.

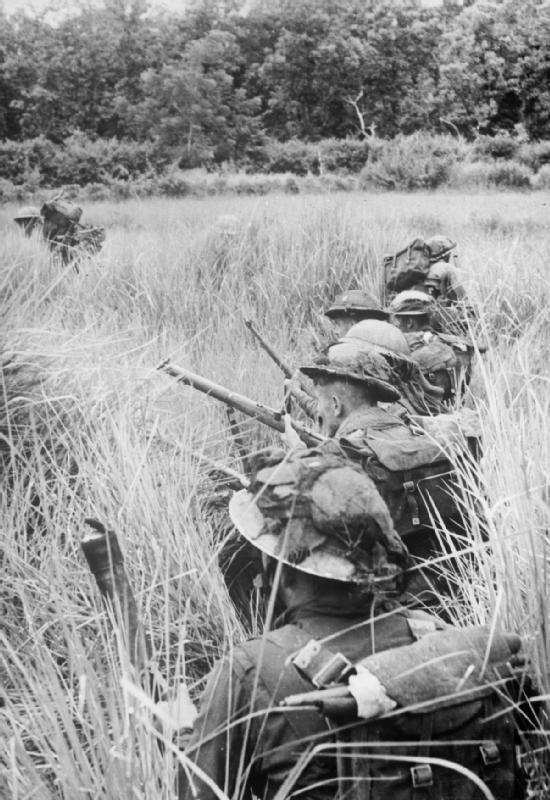
Men of the 2nd Battalion, Royal Welch Fusiliers use paddy fields for cover as they approach Japanese positions around Pinbaw, 1944.

The brigade, under the command of Brigadier Frank Festing, led the invasion of Madagascar by Force 121 on 5 May 1942. It left Madagascar for two weeks in East Africa in late August 1942 and finally departed on 16 October 1942 for South Africa. After two months, the brigade departed for India, arriving on 26 January 1943, and came under the command of Frank Festing's 36th Indian Infantry Division, where it was trained in amphibious assault operations. It entered Burma on 12 February 1944.

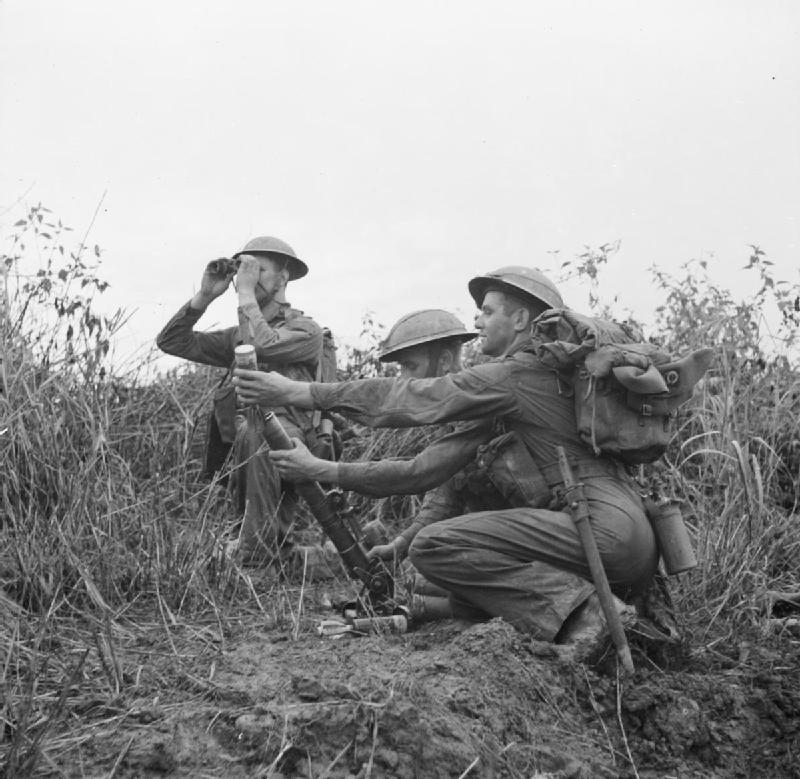
A 2-inch mortar team of the 2nd Battalion, East Lancashire Regiment, keep up covering fire during the advance on Pinbaw, December 1944.

It remained in 36 Division, which was redesignated as the British 36th Infantry Division on 1 September 1944, for the rest of the Burma Campaign, returning to India in June 1944 before flying into North Burma in August 1944 and advancing south to Mandalay. Throughout its time in the 36th Division, it was commanded by Brigadier Hugh Stockwell. The 29th Brigade returned to India in May 1945.

Officially recognised battles:

- North Arakan 1 January – 12 June 1944
- Mandalay 12/13 February – 21 March 1945
- Rangoon Road 1 April – 6 May 1945

== Korean War ==
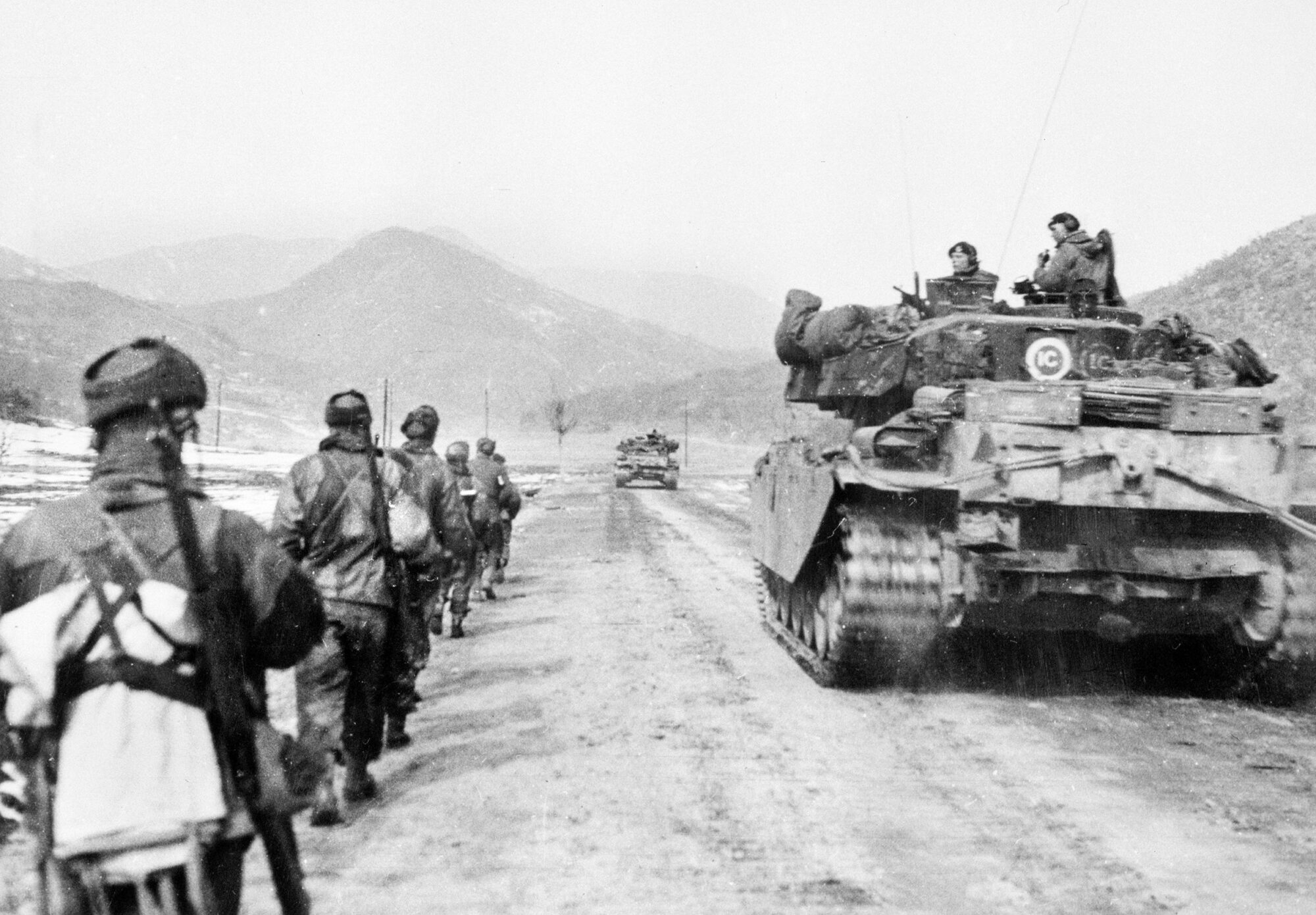
Tanks and infantry of the 29th Brigade advancing to attack Hill 327, March 1951.

The 29th Brigade was back in existence by 1949, and then was re-mustered after the outbreak of the Korean War as 29th Independent Infantry Brigade to reinforce the United Nations war effort. When it arrived in Korea, in December 1950, it comprised the 1st Battalion, Royal Northumberland Fusiliers, 1st Battalion, the Gloucestershire Regiment, 1st Battalion, the Royal Ulster Rifles, 8th King's Royal Irish Hussars, C Squadron, 7th Royal Tank Regiment (specialised armour), 45 Field Regiment RA, 11 LAA Battery RA, and 170 Mortar Battery RA, plus supporting units. It also incorporated elements from non-British forces, including the Belgian United Nations Command.

The brigade saw action during the third Battle for Seoul in late December 1950 and the Chinese Spring Offensive (the Battle of the Imjin River) in April 1951. In July 1951, it was re-organized as 29th British Infantry Brigade and absorbed into the 1st Commonwealth Division, the brigade finished its tour of duty in November 1951. In September 1956 all British troops had left Korea, thus ending the brigade's history.

== Component units ==
=== First World War ===
1914–1918

- 5th (Service) Battalion, Royal Irish Regiment (August 1914 to June 1915)
- 6th (Service) Battalion, Royal Irish Rifles (August 1914 to May 1918)
- 5th (Service) Battalion, Connaught Rangers (August 1914 to April 1918)
- 6th (Service) Battalion, Prince of Wales's Leinster Regiment (Royal Canadians) (August 1914 to 2 May 1918)
- 10th (Service) Battalion, Hampshire Regiment (June 1915 to November 1916)
- 1st Battalion, Prince of Wales' Leinster Regiment (Royal Canadians) (November 1916 to end of war)
- 29th Machine Gun Company (May 1916 to May 1918)
- 29th Trench Mortar Battery (October 1916 to October 1917)
- 1st Battalion, 54th Sikhs (Frontier Force) (April 1918 to end of war)
- 1st Battalion, 101st Grenadiers (April 1918 to end of war)
- 2nd Battalion, 151st Sikh Infantry (June 1918 to end of war)

=== Second World War ===
1939

- 1st Battalion, Buffs (Royal East Kent Regiment)
- 2nd Battalion, Scots Guards

1940–1945

- 1st Battalion, Royal Scots Fusiliers
- 2nd Battalion, East Lancashire Regiment
- 2nd Battalion, Royal Welch Fusiliers
- 2nd Battalion, South Lancashire Regiment (only till April 16, 1944)
- 29th Independent Brigade Group Anti-tank Company (1 September 1940 – 18 January 1941)
- 204th (Oban) Anti-tank Battery, Royal Artillery (16 July 1940 – 5 May 1941)
- 17th Field Regiment, Royal Artillery (16 July 1940 – 5 May 1941)
- "E" Company, 5th Argyll and Sutherland Highlanders (Machine Guns) 16 August 1940 – 11 June 1941)
- 29th Independent Brigade Group Machine Gun Company Argyll and Sutherland Highlanders (12 June 1941 – 31 October 1941)
- 29th Independent Brigade Group Reconnaissance Company (19 January 1941 – 5 May 1941)
- 29th Independent Brigade Group Machine Gun Company Royal Northumberland Fusiliers (19 January 1941 – 5 May 1941)
- "B" SS Squadron Royal Armoured Corps (20 August 1942 – 1 June 1943)
- 455th Independent Light Battery, Royal Artillery (20 August 1942 – 1 June 1943)
- "D" Company, 2nd Manchester Regiment (Machine Guns) 17 October 1943 – 16 June 1944)
- 236th Field Company, Royal Engineers (16 July 1940 – 25 January 1943)
- 29th Independent Brigade Group Company, Royal Army Service Corps 1 August 1940 – 5 May 1941)
- 154th Field Ambulance, Royal Army Medical Corps (16 July 1940 – 25 January 1943)
- 29th Independent Brigade Group Workshop, Royal Army Ordnance Corps (27 April 1940 – 10 July 1941)
- 29th Independent Brigade Group Ordnance Field Park, Royal Army Ordnance Corps (29 April 1940 – 5 May 1941)
- 29th Independent Brigade Group Provost Section, Royal Military Police (18 July 1940 – 15 January 1943)

From May–Aug 1945

- 1st Battalion, Cameronians (Scottish Rifles)
- 1st Battalion, Essex Regiment
- 2nd Battalion, Queen's Royal Regiment (West Surrey)

=== Korean War ===
From Nov 1950 – July 1951

- As 29th Independent Infantry Brigade

From July–Nov 1951

- 1st Battalion Royal Northumberland Fusiliers
- 1st Battalion Gloucestershire Regiment
- 1st Battalion Royal Ulster Rifles

From Nov 51 – Nov 52

- 1st Battalion Royal Norfolk Regiment
- 1st Battalion Royal Leicestershire Regiment
- 1st Battalion Welch Regiment

from Nov 52 – July 53

- 1st Battalion The Black Watch
- 1st Battalion King's Regiment (Liverpool)
- 1st Battalion Duke of Wellington's Regiment

== Commanders ==
First World War

- Brigadier-General R. J. Cooper (26 August 1914)

- Acting: Lieutenant-Colonel H. F. N. Jourdain (11 August 1915)
- Acting: Lieutenant-Colonel Q. G. K. Agnew (13 August 1915)
- Acting: Lieutenant-Colonel H. F. N. Jourdain (10 September 1915)

- Brigadier-General R. S. Vandeleur (22 September 1915)

- Acting: Lieutenant-Colonel J. Craske (8 June 1917)

- Brigadier-General R. S. Vandeleur (28 July 1917)

- Acting: Lieutenant-Colonel E. H. Wildblood (9 June 1918)

- Brigadier-General C. L. Smith (12 June 1918)

- Acting: Lieutenant-Colonel E. H. Wildblood (12 June 1918)

- Brigadier-General C. L. Smith (21 August 1918)

Second World War

- Lt-Col E.G. Earle (acting commander)
- Brig. Sir G.W.H. Leese, Bart
- Brig. J.M.L. Grover
- Brig. F.W. Festing
- Brig. H.C. Stockwell
- Brig. G.E.R. Bastin
- Lt-Col. C.S. Mill
- Brig. J.J. McCully

Korean War

- Brig T. Brodie
- Brig A.H.G. Ricketts
- Brig D.A. Kendrew
