= Fountain Inn, Ashurst =

Fountain Inn
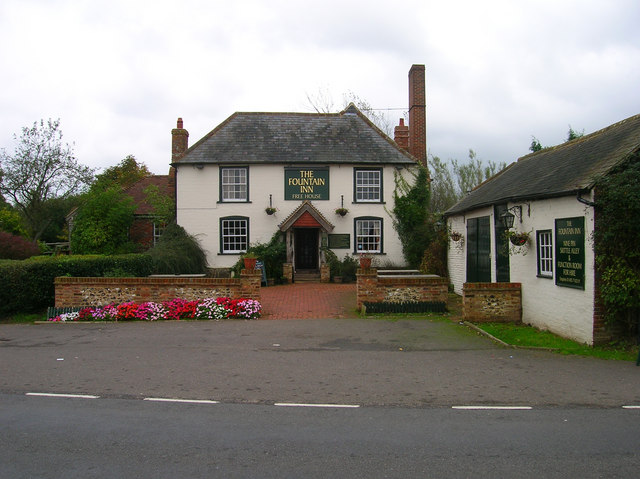
- The inn viewed from the south

- Location within West Sussex
- 50°55′58″N 0°19′17″W
- Location: Off Horsham Road, Ashurst
- OS grid reference: TQ 1805 1616

History
- Built: 16th century

Site notes
- Area: West Sussex
- Architectural style: Georgian
- Restored: Early 19th century

Listed Building – Grade II
- Official name: The Fountain Inn
- Designated: 9 May 1980
- Reference no.: 1027457

The Fountain Inn is a 16th-century public house in the village of Ashurst, in the Horsham district of West Sussex, England. After a period as a farmhouse, it was converted into the village inn and was extended and given a Georgian façade in the 18th century. English Heritage has listed the building at Grade II for its architectural and historical importance.

== History ==
Ashurst is a small village and civil parish about 3 miles (5 km) north of the town of Steyning. The parish covers a large area (2,494 acres (1,009 ha)) and consists mostly of well-spaced farms and other scattered buildings, but a small settlement had developed around the Horsham—Steyning road by the early 16th century. Many of the present buildings are 16th-century, although in some cases they replaced older buildings. Development spread along the road in the 17th century.

The first inn in the parish was to the south of the main settlement, near Horsebridge Common. It existed by the 17th century and over time was known by at least three names, the last of which was The Fountain. The building occupied by the present inn of that name was one of several timber-framed, partly tile-hung farmhouses in the centre of the village, opposite the village pond. It became an inn under the sign of the Red Lion by 1788, and adopted the name Fountain Inn soon afterwards.

In the early 19th century, the building was extended: an extra wing was added on the north side, perpendicular to the original structure, in brick. In contrast to the tiled roof of the older part, the newer wing had a roof of slate. At the same time, the façade was altered from its original timber-framed appearance: the Georgian style, popular at the time, was adopted.

Author Hilaire Belloc, who wrote extensively about Sussex in his fiction and non-fiction works, mentioned the Fountain Inn in his novel The Four Men: a Farrago; he wrote approvingly about the beer.

The Fountain Inn was listed at Grade II by English Heritage on 9 May 1980; this defines it as a "nationally important" building of "special interest".

== Architecture ==
The façade of the newer (north and west) part of the Fountain Inn, facing the road, was clad in painted cement during the 19th-century alterations. It has a range of two evenly spaced sash windows, a hipped roof of tiles, a steep-roofed entrance porch and two gable-end chimneys. The wing to the north is of brick with a slate-covered roof and sash windows. Both parts of the building have two storeys. Inside, there is a smaller bar with a large inglenook, and a larger bar to the rear.

== In popular culture ==
In 1979, the pub was used to film the promotional video for the Paul McCartney Christmas song "Wonderful Christmastime" with his band Wings.
