= Charles Harington (British Army officer, born 1910) =

British Army general (1910–2007)

General Sir Charles Harington GCB CBE DSO MC
- Born: 5 May 1910; Royal Tunbridge Wells, Kent, England
- Died: 13 February 2007 (aged 96)
- Military career
- Allegiance: United Kingdom
- Branch: British Army
- Service years: 1930–1971
- Rank: General
- Service number: 44880
- Unit: Cheshire Regiment
- Commands: 1st Battalion, Manchester Regiment; 1st Battalion, Parachute Regiment; 49th Infantry Brigade; School of Infantry; 3rd Division; Staff College, Camberley; Middle East Command
- Conflicts: Arab revolt in Palestine; Second World War; Mau Mau Uprising; Aden Emergency
- Awards: Knight Grand Cross of the Order of the Bath; Commander of the Order of the British Empire; Companion of the Distinguished Service Order; Military Cross

General Sir Charles Henry Pepys Harington, GCB, CBE, DSO, MC (5 May 1910 – 13 February 2007) was an officer in the British Army. He served in the British Expeditionary Force and in Normandy during the Second World War. He was later Commander-in-Chief of the three-service Middle East Command from 1963 to 1965, based at Aden. He ended his military career as Chief of Personnel and Logistics at the UK Ministry of Defence from 1968 to 1971.

== Early life and career ==
Charles Henry Pepys Harington was born in Royal Tunbridge Wells, into a military family, on 5 May 1910. He was related to General Sir Charles Harington Harington, the commander in Constantinople in 1922 during the Chanak crisis. His father, Lieutenant-Colonel Herbert Hastings Harington, an officer in the British Indian Army, was killed in action in Mesopotamia in 1916, and Harington and his two sisters were raised by their widowed mother.

Charles Harington was educated at Malvern College and later the Royal Military College, Sandhurst, and was commissioned as a second lieutenant into the Cheshire Regiment on 30 January 1930, being immediately posted to the regiment's 2nd Battalion. Promoted on 30 January 1933, he excelled at athletics, holding the British Army record for the 440 yard hurdles and competing for the Army against the other services. He was captain of the 2nd Battalion's athletics team, winning the Army Inter-Unit Team Athletic Championship in 1937, 1938 and 1939. He succeeded Thomas Brodie as the adjutant of the 2nd Battalion, then commanded by Lieutenant-Colonel Eric Nares, from 1936 to 1939, and on 1 August 1938 he was promoted to captain. During this time the battalion was deployed to Palestine during the Arab revolt, where it remained trying to keep the peace between the Jews and the Arabs, until 1938 when it returned to Aldershot, Hampshire.

== Second World War ==
He joined the British Expeditionary Force (BEF) in France in 1939 and 1940, commanding a machine gun company of the 2nd Battalion, Cheshire Regiment, which was attached to Major-General Harold Alexander's 1st Infantry Division. During the retreat from the River Dyle in the face of the German blitzkrieg in May 1940, his company formed part of the division's rearguard, supporting the 13th/18th Royal Hussars and 21st Anti-Tank Regiment of the Royal Artillery. He was awarded the Military Cross (MC) for his actions, and was evacuated from Dunkirk.

He spent most of the war on a variety of staff appointments, and married Victoire Marion Williams-Freeman in 1942. Promoted to lieutenant-colonel, he was appointed as Commanding Officer (CO) of the 1st Battalion, Manchester Regiment, in March 1944. The battalion (formerly the 6th Battalion, a Territorial Army unit before being redesignated as 1st Battalion in May 1942), serving as the machine gun battalion of the 53rd (Welsh) Infantry Division, a first-line TA formation commanded by Major-General Robert Ross, was poorly trained and virtually unfit for duty, but Harington quickly brought it to full combat readiness. The battalion, along with its parent division, landed in Normandy, France, in late June, three weeks after the Normandy landings, and was engaged in severe fighting throughout the Battle of Normandy, and most of the subsequent fighting in Western Europe, until Harington relinquished command in mid-September 1944, when he became a General Staff Officer Grade 1 (GSO1) with the 53rd Division HQ. He retained this post until May 1945. For his services as CO of the 1st Manchesters, Harington was appointed a Companion of the Distinguished Service Order (DSO) in early 1945.

== Post-war service ==
Harington was rapidly promoted after the war. He was General Staff Officer Grade 1 at the headquarters of the 53rd (Welsh) Division, then served as an instructor at the Staff College in Camberley for two years, before joining the British Military Mission in Greece during the Greek Civil War. He commanded the 1st Battalion, Parachute Regiment from 1949 to 1951. He then served as military assistant to two Chief of the Imperial General Staff, Field Marshal Viscount Slim and General Sir John Harding, before spending time at Supreme Headquarters Allied Powers Europe in France.

Promoted to Brigadier, he commanded the 49th Infantry Brigade in Kenya in 1955 and 1956, during the Mau Mau Uprising. He was appointed CBE in 1957, and was commandant of the School of Infantry in Warminster in 1958. He was promoted to major-general, and took command of the 3rd Division in 1959. He then became commandant of the Staff College, Camberley in 1961. He succeeded Major-General Tom Brodie as Colonel of the Cheshire Regiment in January 1962, remaining the regiment's Colonel until 1968.

== Aden ==
Promoted to lieutenant-general, he was appointed Commander-in-Chief of the three-service Middle East Command in May 1963, with responsibility for an area extending from the Persian Gulf to East Africa. In January 1964, he had to deal with mutinous battalions in newly independent Kenya, Tanganyika and Uganda, formerly part of the King's African Rifles. He was knighted in 1964.

He then had to deal with insurgency of Haushabi and Radfan tribes in the Western Aden Protectorate on the road between Aden and Dhala. The deployment of British forces bolstered support for the Front for the Liberation of South Yemen, triggering a campaign of violence in Aden itself.

Sir Arthur Charles, the Speaker of the nascent National Council, was murdered outside his house in Crater in September 1965. Direct British rule was reimposed when the president of the council, Abdul Qawi Makkawi, refused to condemn the killing. The subsequent counterinsurgency operations failed: the Aden Police were infiltrated, and officers in the local Special Branch were killed. In 1966, the British government, led by Harold Wilson, decided to withdraw British forces from Aden and the Protectorates by 1968, by which time Harington had returned to the UK.

== Late career ==
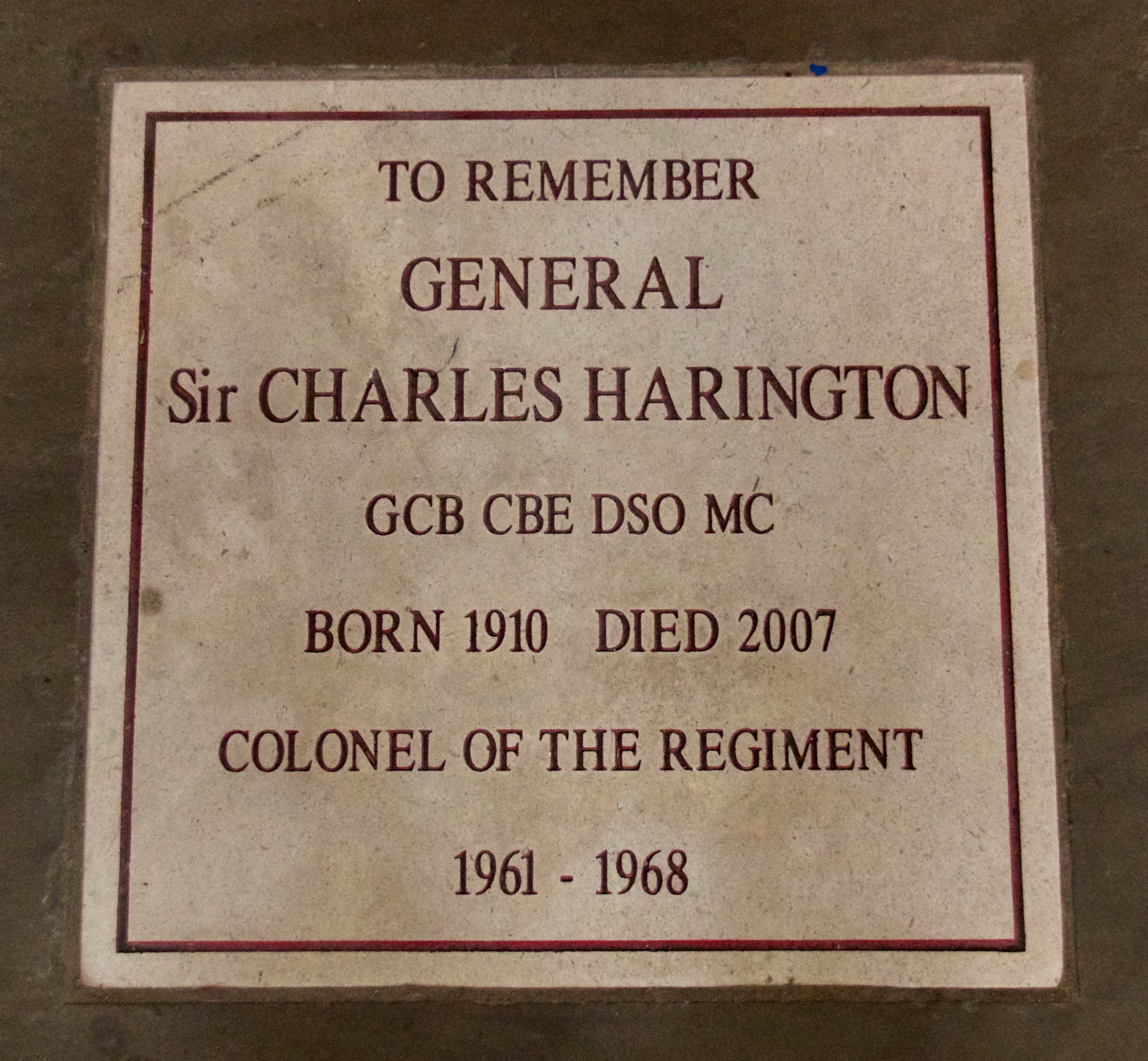
Memorial to General Sir Charles Harington in Chester Cathedral.

Harington returned from Aden in 1966 to take up the position of Deputy Chief of the Imperial General Staff. He was promoted to general in 1968, and became Chief of Personnel and Logistics at the UK Ministry of Defence. He was appointed GCB in 1969, and was an Aide-de-camp to the H. M. the Queen from 1969 to 1971. He retired from the Army in 1971.

In retirement, Harington was president of the Combined Cadet Force Association from 1971 to 1980 and also from 1972 to 1980 chairman of the Governors of the Royal Star and Garter Home, Richmond, for disabled ex-servicemen. He was a vice-president of Battersea Dogs' Home and from 1966 to 1999 president of the Milocarian (Tri-Service) Athletic Club. He also enjoyed sailing, and was president of the Hurlingham Club for over twenty-five years.

Harington's wife died in 2000, and he himself died in 2007, to be survived by a son and two daughters.

== Awards and decorations ==
- Knight Grand Cross of the Order of the Bath (1969), previously Knight Commander (1964), and Companion (1961)
- Commander of the Order of the British Empire (8 March 1957), previously Officer (Civil Division) (1953)
- Companion of the Distinguished Service Order (1 February 1945)
- Military Cross (20 August 1940)
- Mentioned in despatches (4 April 1946)
- Knight Grand Officer of the Order of Orange Nassau with Swords (Netherlands, 18 July 1947)

Military offices
Preceded by Geoffrey Musson	Commandant of the School of Infantry; 1958–1959	Succeeded by Antony Read
Preceded by George Gordon-Lennox	GOC 3rd Division; 1959–1961	Succeeded by Vivian Street
Preceded by Reginald Hewetson	Commandant of the Staff College, Camberley; 1961–1963	Succeeded by John Worsley
Honorary titles
Preceded by Thomas Brodie	Colonel of the Cheshire Regiment; 1962–1968	Succeeded by Sir Napier Crookenden
Military offices
Preceded by Sir Richard Anderson	C-in-C Middle East Land Forces; 1963–1966	Succeeded by Post disbanded
Preceded by Sir John Hackett	Deputy Chief of the Imperial General Staff; 1966–1968	Succeeded by Sir Ian Freeland
Preceded by Sir Desmond Dreyer	Chief of Personnel and Logistics, UK Ministry of Defence; 1968–1971	Succeeded by Sir Christopher Foxley-Norris
