= Thomas Brodie =

British Army officer (1903–1993)

Major-General Thomas Brodie CB CBE DSO
- Brodie in 1961
- Born: 20 November 1903; Bellingham, Northumberland, England
- Died: 1 September 1993 (aged 89); Basingstoke, Hampshire, England
- Military career
- Allegiance: United Kingdom
- Branch: British Army
- Service years: 1926–1957
- Rank: Major-General
- Service number: 34236
- Unit: Cheshire Regiment
- Commands: 1st Infantry Division (1952–1955); 29th Infantry Brigade (1949–1951); 61st (Lorried) Infantry Brigade (1947–1948); 1st Battalion, Cheshire Regiment (1946–1947); 14th Airlanding Brigade (1944–1945); 14th Infantry Brigade (1943–1944); 2nd Battalion, Manchester Regiment (1942)
- Conflicts: Second World War; Korean War; Third Battle of Seoul; Battle of the Imjin River
- Awards: Companion of the Order of the Bath; Commander of the Order of the British Empire; Distinguished Service Order; Mentioned in Despatches; Silver Star (2; United States) (with oak leaf cluster); Officer of the Legion of Merit (United States)

Major-General Thomas Brodie, CB, CBE, DSO (20 November 1903 – 1 September 1993) was a British Army officer who saw service in the Second World War, in Palestine and in the Korean War. After retirement in 1955, he became involved with the British pressure group the Economic League.

== Early life and family ==
Thomas Brodie was born on 20 November 1903 in Bellingham, Northumberland, to Thomas Brodie. He attended Durham University (Bede College), gaining a Bachelor of Arts degree in 1924. In 1938, Brodie married Jane Margaret Chapman Walker. The couple had three sons and a daughter.

== Military career ==
Brodie was commissioned as a second lieutenant into the Cheshire Regiment on 3 February 1926. In May 1936, recently promoted to captain, he was appointed as the Cheshire's regimental adjutant. From September 1939, he served as an instructor at the Royal Military College, Sandhurst. He was promoted to major in April 1941 and between 1942 and 1943 as an acting lieutenant colonel, Brodie commanded the 2nd Battalion, The Manchester Regiment. From November 1943 until March 1945, he commanded the 14th Infantry Brigade in India and Burma (subsequently redesignated in November 1944 as the 14th Airlanding Brigade). In this period, his substantive rank remained as major, but he received acting and temporary ranks of lieutenant colonel, colonel and brigadier.

After the war, Brodie returned to the Cheshires and, between 1946 and 1947, he was commanding officer of the 1st Battalion. In May 1947, he was formally promoted to lieutenant colonel and, within a few days, to colonel. Between 1947 and 1948, he served in Palestine, being appointed a Commander of the Order of the British Empire and mentioned in despatches.

At last after weeks of frustration we have nothing between us and the Chinese. I have no intention that this Brigade Group will retire before the enemy unless ordered by higher authority to conform with general movement. If you meet him you are to knock hell out of him with everything you got. You are only to give ground on my orders.

— Brigadier Thomas Brodie's order to the 29th Independent Infantry Brigade during the Third Battle of Seoul

As a local major general (he received the substantive rank of brigadier in October 1952), Brodie commanded the 29th Infantry Brigade in Korea. He participated in the difficult Third Battle of Seoul and the Battle of the Imjin River, defending the northern approach of Seoul in both battles. For his service in Korea, he was awarded the Distinguished Service Order and the US Silver Star (twice) and the Legion of Merit.

Between 1952 and July 1955, Brodie was general officer commanding, 1st Infantry Division, based in the Middle East. He retired from the army on 1 January 1957. Brody was appointed as honorary colonel of the Cheshire Regiment (a ceremonial role) on 26 December 1955 and served until December 1961. He was associated with the British right-wing pressure group, the Economic League, from 1957 until 1984.

Thomas Brodie died at Basingstoke, Hampshire, on 1 September 1993. His wife, Margaret, had died the previous year.

== Bibliography ==
- Farrar-Hockley, Anthony (1990), Official History: The British Part in the Korean War, vol. I, London, England: HMSO, ISBN 0-11-630953-9

Military offices
Preceded by Francis Matthews	General Officer Commanding 1st Infantry Division; 1952–1955	Succeeded by Rodney Moore
Honorary titles
Preceded by Arthur Percival	Colonel of the Cheshire Regiment; 1955–1962	Succeeded by Sir Charles Harington
