= Rodney Moore (British Army officer) =

British Army general (1905–1985)

General Sir Rodney Moore GCVO KCB CBE DSO KStJ
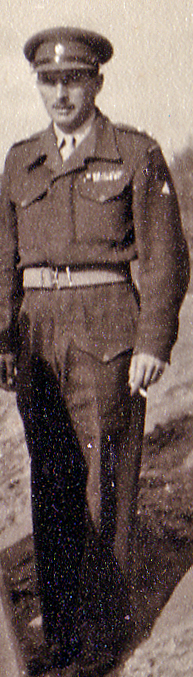
- Rodney Moore, Palestine, 1946
- Born: James Newton Rodney Moore; 9 June 1905; Bunbury, Western Australia, Australia
- Died: 19 May 1985 (aged 79); Richmond upon Thames, London, England
- Relatives: Sir Newton Moore (father)
- Military career
- Allegiance: United Kingdom
- Branch: British Army
- Service years: 1924–1966
- Rank: General
- Service number: 32071
- Unit: Grenadier Guards
- Commands: Malaysian Armed Forces (1959–1964); London District (1957–1959); 10th Armoured Division (1955–1957); 1st Infantry Division (1955); 1st Guards Brigade (1946–1947); 8th Infantry Brigade (1945–1946); 2nd Battalion, Grenadier Guards (1944–1945)
- Conflicts: Second World War; Palestine Emergency; Malayan Emergency; Indonesia–Malaysia confrontation
- Awards: Knight Grand Cross of the Royal Victorian Order; Knight Commander of the Order of the Bath; Commander of the Order of the British Empire; Companion of the Distinguished Service Order; Mentioned in Despatches; Knight of the Most Venerable Order of Hospital of Saint John of Jerusalem; Order of the Crown (Belgium); Commander of the Order of the Defender of the Realm (Malaysia); Commander of the Order of Loyalty to the Crown of Malaysia

General Sir James Newton Rodney Moore, GCVO, KCB, CBE, DSO, KStJ (9 June 1905 – 19 May 1985) was an Australian-born senior officer in the British Army. He served in the Second World War and the Palestine Emergency and was General Officer Commanding London District from 1957 to 1959. He served as the second Chief of the Malaysian Armed Forces Staff from 1959 to 1965. His tenure coincided with the final stages of the Malayan Emergency and the early years of the Indonesia–Malaysia confrontation. Moore's final appointment was as Defence Services Secretary, a role he fulfilled from 1964 to 1966.

== Early life and education ==
Moore was born in Bunbury, Western Australia, on 9 June 1905, the son of Major General Sir Newton Moore and his wife, Isabel Lowrie. He was educated at Harrow School and the Royal Military College, Sandhurst.

== Military career ==
After graduating from the Royal Military College, Sandhurst, Moore was commissioned as a second lieutenant into the Grenadier Guards on 29 January 1925. During the Second World War, between 1942 and 1944, he served as a General Staff Officer (GSO) with the Guards Armoured Division. He subsequently became the commanding officer of the 2nd Battalion, Grenadier Guards, during operations in North-West Europe. In 1945, he assumed command of the 8th Infantry Brigade, operating in Germany and later in Palestine.

In 1948, Moore returned to the United Kingdom and was appointed chief of staff of London District, a post he held until 1950. He then attended the Imperial Defence College. From 1951 to 1953, Moore served as Deputy adjutant general with the British Army of the Rhine in Germany. He later received his first NATO appointment as chief of staff at Allied Forces Northern Europe. In 1955, Moore returned to the Middle East, where he held command of the 1st Infantry Division before being transferred later that year to take command of the 10th Armoured Division.

Moore returned to London in 1957 to assume the post of Major-General commanding the Household Brigade and London District. In 1959, he undertook another overseas assignment, serving in the Federation of Malaya as Chief of the Armed Forces Staff, a position now recognised as the Chief of Defence Forces of Malaysia. He also held the concurrent role of Director of Border Operations during the latter phase of the Malayan Emergency. In recognition of his service, Moore was conferred the honorary title of Tan Sri following his appointment as a Commander of the Order of the Defender of the Realm (Malay: Panglima Mangku Negara, PMN) by the King of Malaysia in 1961. His final active military appointment was as the first Defence Services Secretary at the Ministry of Defence in London. He retired from military service in 1966.

Between 1965 and 1966, Moore served as Aide-de-Camp General to Queen Elizabeth II. He later held ceremonial duties as Chief Steward of Hampton Court Palace and was also appointed a Gentleman Usher to the Royal Household.

Military offices
| Preceded by Thomas Brodie | GOC 1st Infantry Division; 1955 | Succeeded by Guy Gregson |
| Preceded by Sir George Johnson | GOC London District; 1957–1959 | Succeeded by Sir George Burns |
| Preceded by Frank Hastings Brooke | Chief of Malaysian Armed Forces Staff; 1959–1964 | Succeeded by Tunku Osman |
| New office | Defence Services Secretary; 1964–1966 | Succeeded by Sir Ian Hogg |
| Preceded by Sir Richard Goodbody | Colonel Commandant and President, Honourable Artillery Company; 1966–1976 | Succeeded by Sir Victor FitzGeorge-Balfour |
