= St James's Church, Ashurst =

Church in Ashurst, West Sussex, England

Coordinates: 50.9348°N 0.3272°W

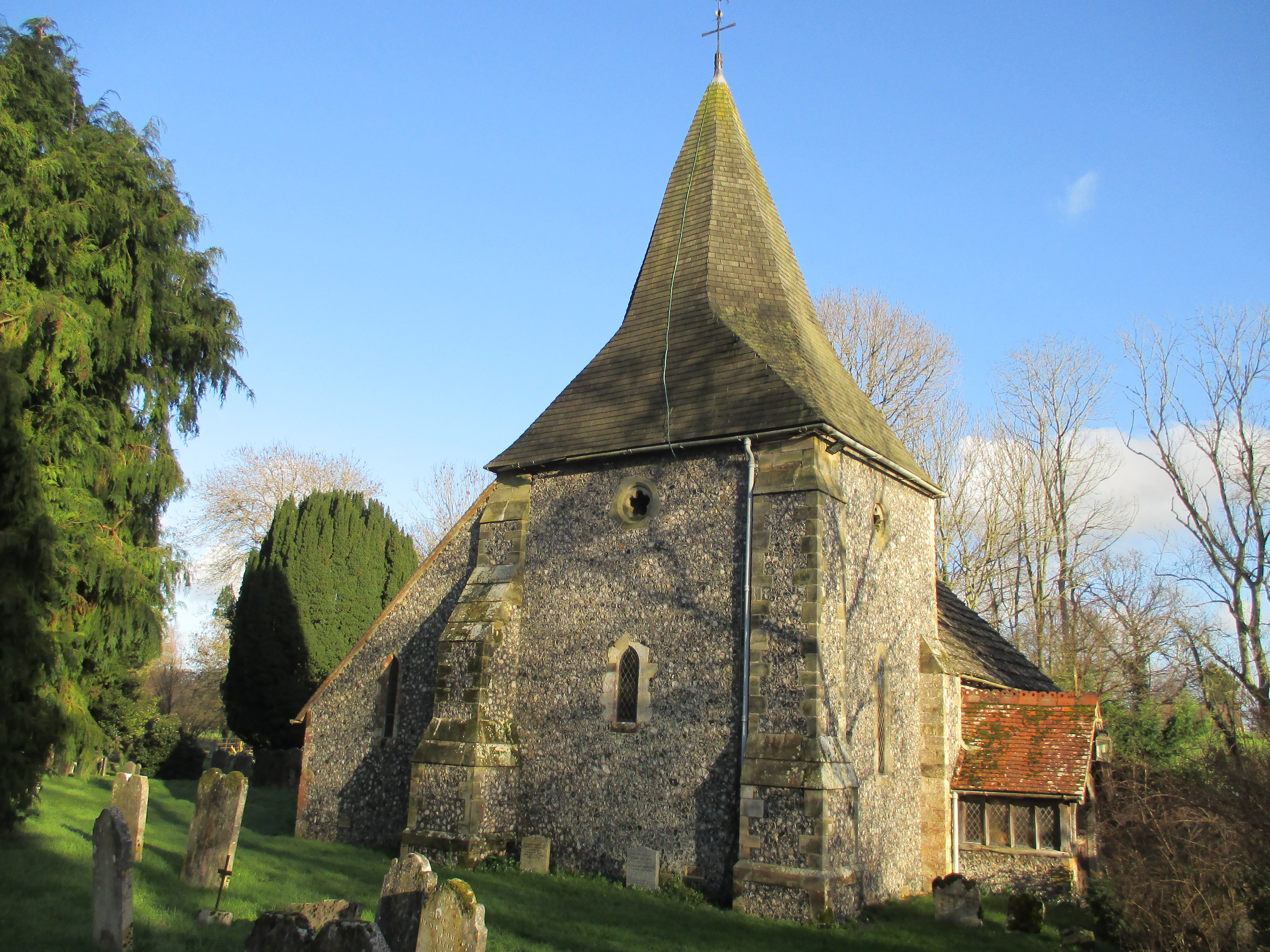
Exterior of the church

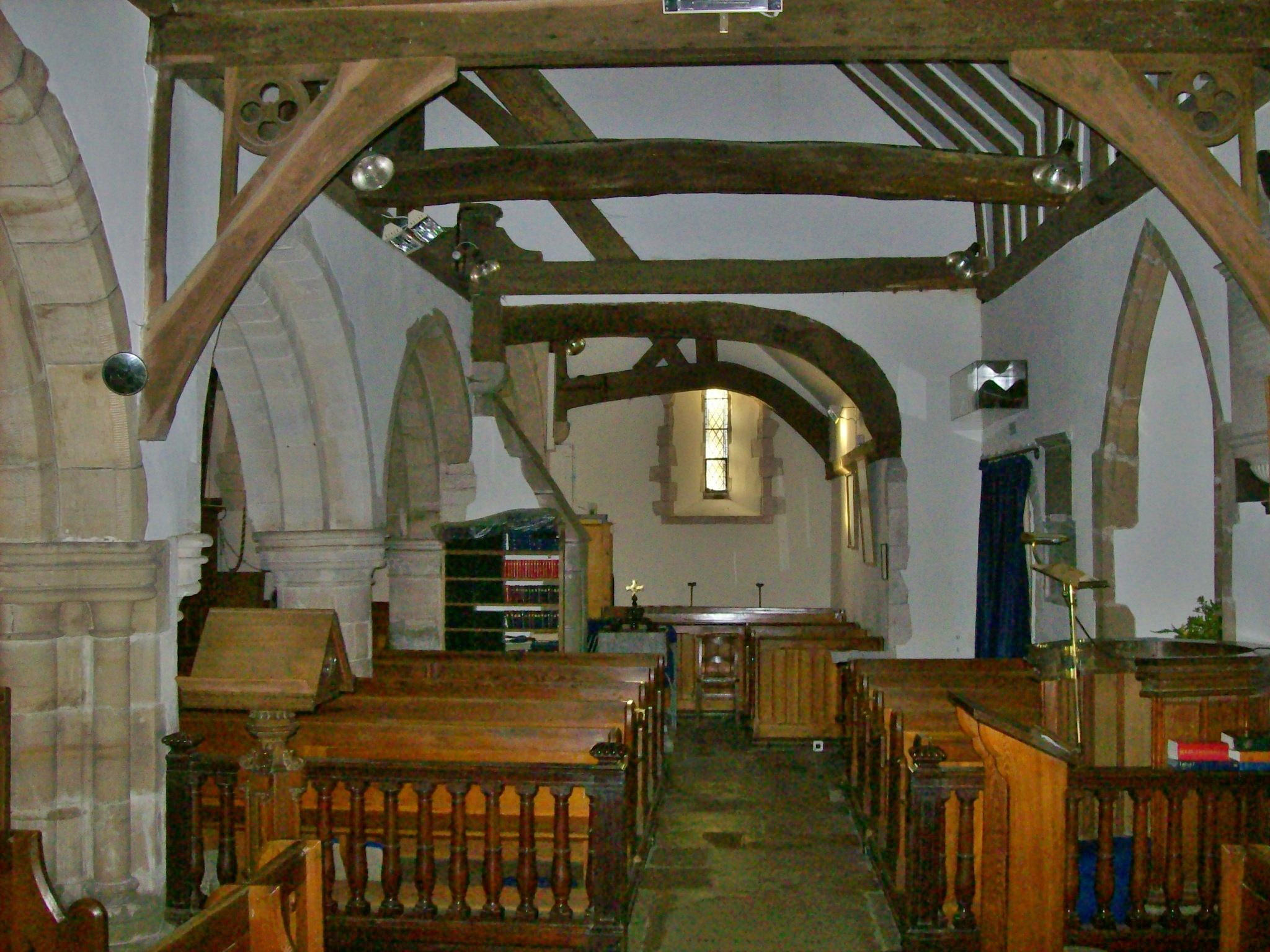
Interior of the church

St James's Church is a Church of England parish church in Ashurst, West Sussex. The church is a grade I listed building and it dates from the early 12th century.

== Present day ==
The parish of Ashurst is joined with St Andrew and St Cuthman, Steyning to form the joint benefice of Steyning and Ashurst. The benefice is in the Archdeaconry of Horsham in the Diocese of Chichester.

== Notable burials ==
- Margaret Barber, English Christian writer under the pseudonym Michael Fairless
