= Ashurst, West Sussex =

Village and parish in West Sussex, England

Coordinates: 50.93227°N 0.3229°W

Ashurst
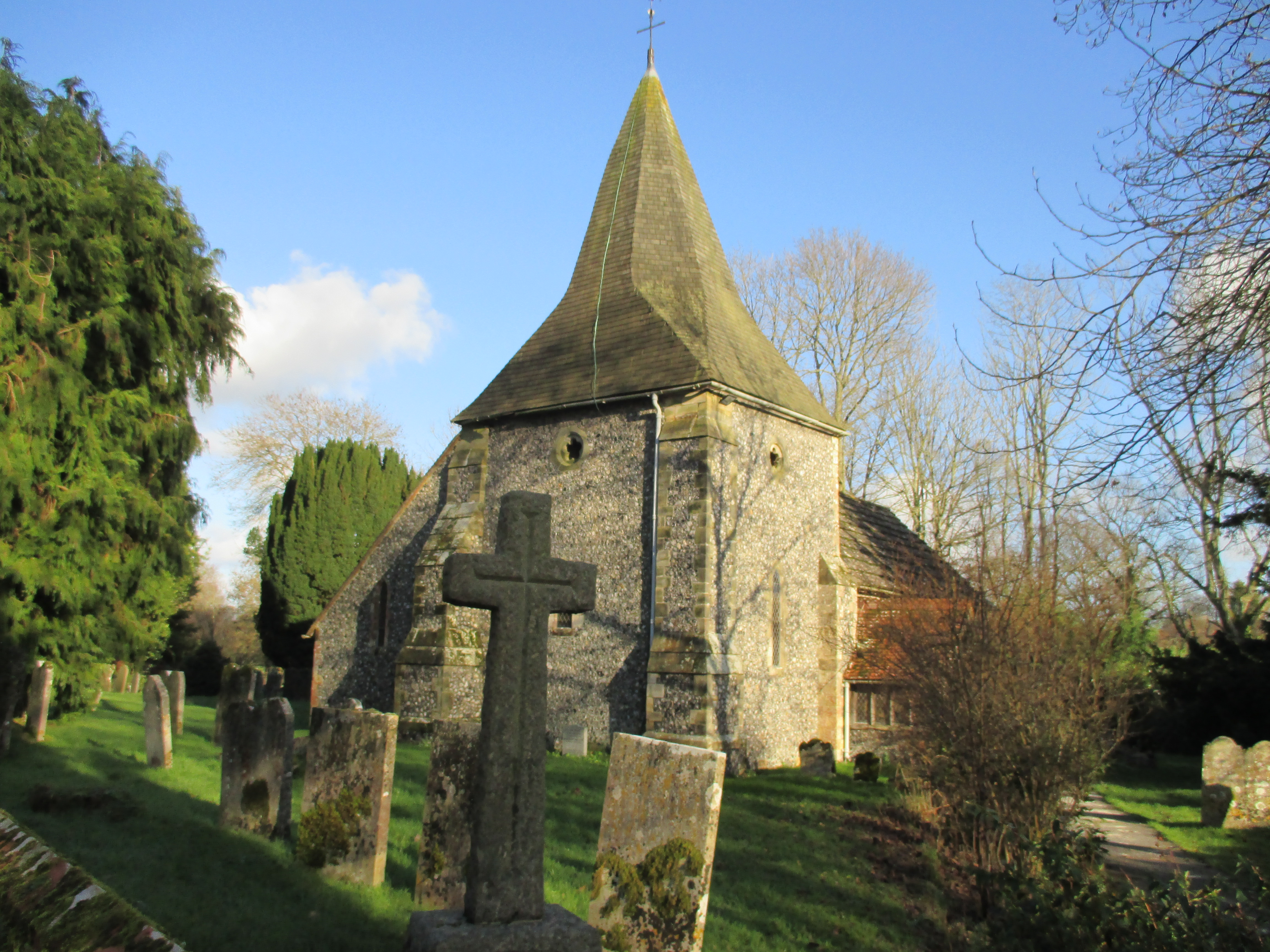
- St James' church and war memorial

- Location within West Sussex
- Area: 10.09 km^{2} (3.90 sq mi)
- Population: 226 2001 Census; 279 (2011 Census)
  - Density: 22/km^{2} (57/sq mi)
- OS grid reference: TQ179161
  - London: 40 miles (64 km) NNE
- Civil parish: Ashurst
- District: Horsham
- Shire county: West Sussex
- Region: South East
- Country: England
- Sovereign state: United Kingdom
- Post town: STEYNING
- Postcode district: BN44
- Dialling code: 01903
- Police: Sussex
- Fire: West Sussex
- Ambulance: South East Coast
- UK Parliament: Arundel and South Downs

Ashurst is a village and civil parish in the Horsham District of West Sussex, England, about 2 miles (3.2 km) west of Henfield and 11 miles (18 km) south of Horsham, on the B2135 road. The village is about 0.6 miles (0.97 km) west of the River Adur. It has a 12th-century parish church dedicated to St James, where local resident Laurence Olivier's funeral was held, as well as a Church of England primary school and a pub, the Fountain Inn.

The parish has a land area of 1,009 hectares (2,490 acres). In the 2001 Census, 226 people lived in 97 households, of whom 112 were economically active. At the 2011 Census the population was 279.
