= List of commanders of the British 5th Division =

5th Division 5th Infantry Division 5th Armoured Division
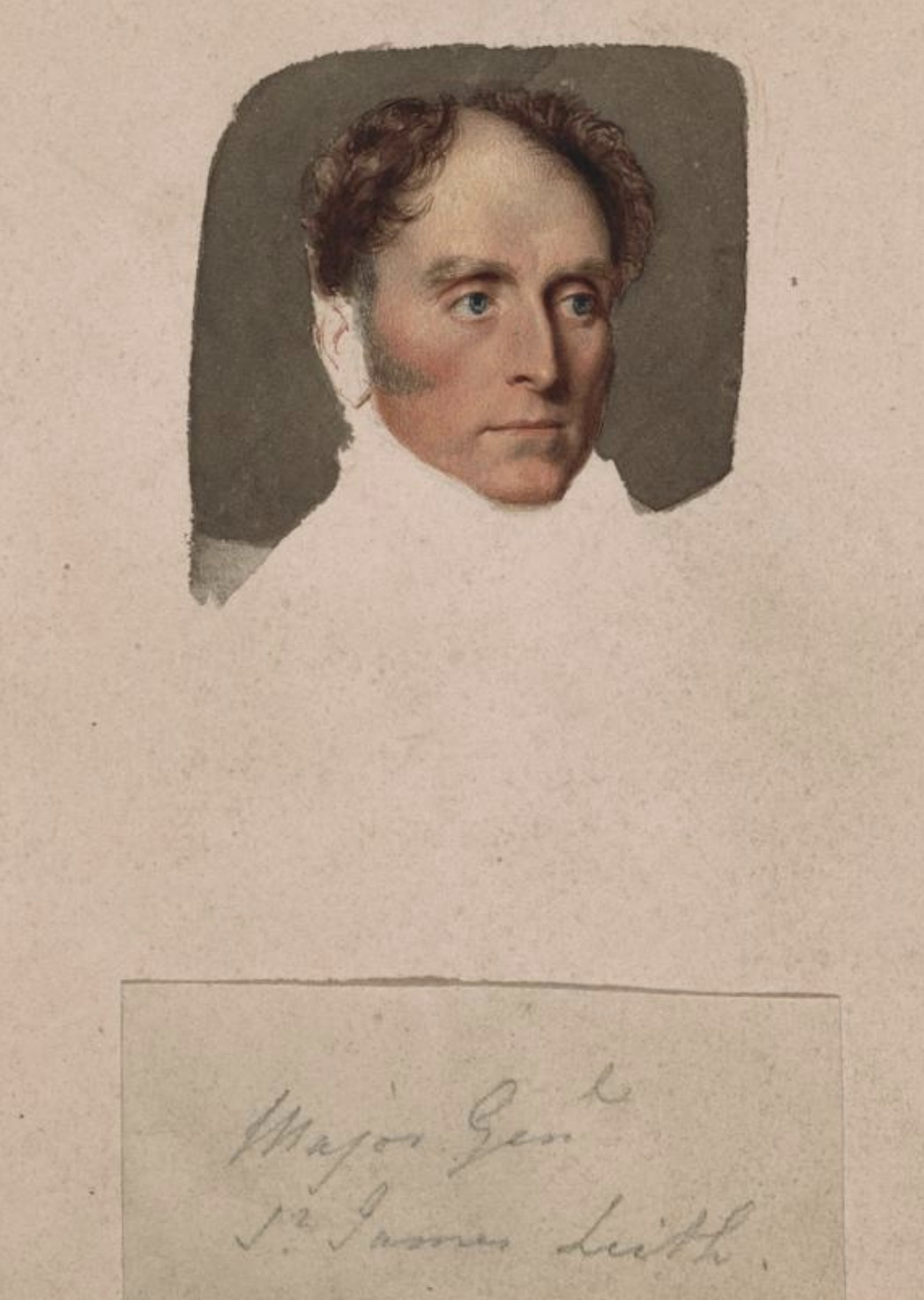
- Sir James Leith, the first commanding officer of the 5th Division.
- Active: Raised and disbanded numerous times between 1810 and 2012
- Country: United Kingdom
- Branch: British Army
- Engagements: Napoleonic Wars; Second Boer War; First World War; Second World War

The 5th Division was an infantry division of the British Army and was first formed in 1809 and disbanded for the final time in 2012. The division was commanded by a general officer commanding (GOC). In this role, the GOC received orders from a level above him in the chain of command, and then used the forces within the division to undertake the mission assigned. In addition to directing the tactical battle in which the division was involved, the GOC oversaw a staff and the administrative, logistical, medical, training, and discipline of the division.

Prior to 1809, the British Army did not use divisional formations. As the British military grew in size during the Napoleonic Wars, the need arose for such an implementation in order to better organise forces for administrative, logistical, and tactical reasons. The 5th Division was formed in 1810 by Lieutenant-General Arthur Wellesley, and served in the Peninsular War (part of the Napoleonic Wars).

== General officer commanding ==
General officer commanding
No.	Appointment date	Rank	General officer commanding	Notes	Source(s)
1	April 1810	Major-General	James Leith	Leith arrived in Portugal, in April 1810, with a brigade of British infantry. These men had come from fighting in the Walcheren Campaign, were stricken with fever and not ready for service until July. Over the following months, the 5th Division was built around this brigade.	
Acting	4 August 1810	Lieutenant-Colonel	James Barnes		
Acting	30 September 1810	Brigadier-General	Andrew Hay		
1	6 October 1810	Major-General	James Leith	On this date, the division was officially formed, and Leith formally made the first general officer commanding	
Acting	1 February 1811	Major-General	James Dunlop		
2	6 February 1811	Major-General	William Erskine		
Acting	7 March 1811	Major-General	James Dunlop		
2	23 April 1811	Major-General	William Erskine		
Acting	11 May 1811	Major-General	James Dunlop		
Acting	2 October 1811	Major-General	George Walker		
1	1 December 1811	Major-General	James Leith	Leith was wounded in action during the Battle of Salamanca on 22 July 1812	
Acting	22 July 1812	Major-General	William Pringle	Assumed temporary command when Leith was wounded	
3	31 July 1812	Major-General	Richard Hulse	Hulse died of typhus on 7 September 1812	
Acting	7 September 1812	Major-General	William Pringle		
4	25 October 1812	Major-General	John Oswald		
Acting	January 1813	Major-General	Andrew Hay		
4	April 1813	Major-General	John Oswald		
1	30 August 1813	Major-General	James Leith	Leith was seriously wounded in action, during the Siege of San Sebastián on 31 August/1 September 1813	
Acting	1 September 1813	Major-General	John Oswald	Oswald was wounded during the Siege of San Sebastián on 31 August/1 September 1813	
Acting	9 October 1813	Major-General	Andrew Hay		
5	December 1813	Major-General	Charles Colville		
Acting	14 April 1814	Major-General	Frederick Robinson	When John Hope was captured at the Battle of Bayonne Colville took command of his corps, leaving Robinson in command of the division for a brief period.	
5	April 1814	Major-General	Charles Colville	At the conclusion of the Peninsular War, in 1814, the division was disbanded in France. The final troops departed in June.	
6	11 April 1815	Lieutenant-General	Thomas Picton	On 11 April 1815, the division was reformed in Southern Netherlands. Following the conclusion of the Napoleonic Wars, the British military in France was reorganised into three divisions. The remaining forces, including the 4th Division, were stood down.	
7	14 November 1899	Lieutenant-General	Charles Warren	Following the outbreak of the Second Boer War, the division was ordered to be formed on 9 November. Warren was appointed as commander five days later, and the division arrived in southern Africa the following month.	
8	20 April 1900	Lieutenant-General	Henry Hildyard	At the end of 1900, while still in southern Africa, the division was broken-up.	
9	14 May 1902	Major-General	Leslie Rundle	The division was reformed in Dover, England	
10	10 November 1903	Major-General	Henry Grant		
11	1907	Major-General	Herbert Plumer	In 1907, the division was reformed in Ireland when the 7th Division was renumbered.	
12	4 February 1909	Major-General	William Campbell		
13	4 February 1913	Major-General	Charles Fergusson	Under Fergusson, the division mobilised for the First World War and moved to France in September 1914 and fought on the Western Front.	
14	18 October 1914	Major-General	Thomas Morland		
15	15 July 1915	Major-General	Charles Kavanagh		
16	1 April 1916	Major-General	Reginald Stephens		
17	4 July 1918	Major-General	John Ponsonby	At the end of the First World War, the division moved into Belgium where it demobilized.	
18	27 October 1919	Major-General	Hugh Jeudwine	The division was reformed in Ireland, and took part in the Irish War of Independence. Following the conclusion of the war, there was no room for the division to be based in Northern Ireland and was disbanded in 1923.	
19	13 December 1929	Major-General	Walter Kirke	The division was reformed in England	
20	30 September 1931	Major-General	Thomas Humphreys		
21	30 March 1934	Major-General	Geoffrey Howard		
22	19 May 1937	Major-General	Guy Williams		
Acting	27 September 1938	Brigadier	Unknown	An unknown interim commander looked after the division between Williams being appointed and Franklyn assuming command	
23	20 December 1938	Major-General	Harold Franklyn	Under Franklyn, the division mobilized for service in the Second World War and moved to France in December 1939. Following the Battle of France, in mid 1940, the division was evacuated back to the UK.	
24	19 July 1940	Major-General	Horatio Berney-Ficklin	During Berney-Ficklin's tenure, the division was transferred to British India, Iraq, Iran, Syria, and Egypt, and Italy where it served during the Allied invasion of Sicily.	
25	3 August 1943	Major-General	Gerard Bucknall	The division fought in the Italian campaign	
26	22 January 1944	Major-General	Philip Gregson-Ellis		
Acting	21 April 1944	Brigadier	Lorne Campbell		
26	29 April 1944	Major-General	Philip Gregson-Ellis	During Gregson-Ellis' tenure, the division returned to Egypt and Palestine.	
27	24 November 1944	Major-General	Richard Hull	Under Hull, the division was transferred to northwest Europe, and took part in the Western Allied invasion of Germany.	
26	1946	Major-General	Philip Gregson-Ellis		
28	July 1947	Major-General	John Churcher	The division was disbanded in September 1947	
29	April 1958	Major-General	Geoffrey Musson	The division was reformed, in Germany, when the 7th Armoured Division was renamed. In 1960, the division was renamed the 1st Division.	
30	1 April 1968	Major-General	Walter Thomas	The division was reformed at Wrexham, England	
31	5 March 1970	Major-General	Mervyn Janes	Janes relinquished command on 26 February 1971. Due to the demand to deploy troops to Northern Ireland, as part of The Troubles, the division was disbanded.	
32	April 1995	Major-General	Ian Freer	The division was reformed at Shrewsbury, England, when the Wales and Western District was redesignated.	
33	16 September 1996	Major-General	Robin Searby		
34	12 January 2000	Major General	Peter Peterkin	This marks the first time the Gazette does not use the hyphen between major and general.	
35	20 December 2000	Major General	Arthur Denaro		
36	28 January 2003	Major General	Nicholas Cottam		
37	9 March 2005	Major General	Andrew Farquhar		
38	7 June 2008	Major General	Martin Rutledge	Rutledge held command until the division was disbanded for the final time in April 2012, as a result of the Strategic Defence and Security Review 2010, and retired shortly after.	
