= 9th/12th Royal Lancers =

British Army cavalry regiment

9th/12th Royal Lancers (Prince of Wales's)
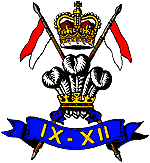
- Badge of the regiment
- Active: 11 September 1960 – 2 May 2015
- Allegiance: United Kingdom
- Branch: British Army
- Type: Cavalry
- Role: Formation Reconnaissance
- Size: One regiment
- Part of: Royal Armoured Corps
- Garrison/HQ: RHQ: South Wigston, Leicester; Regiment: Hohne, Germany
- Nickname: The Delhi Spearmen
- Motto: Ich Dien (I Serve)
- March: Quick: God Bless the Prince of Wales; Slow: Men of Harlech, The Coburg March
- Anniversaries: Mons/Moy

Commanders
- Colonel-in-Chief: Queen Elizabeth the Queen Mother (1960–2002); The Duke of York (2003–2015)
- Colonel of the Regiment: Major-General J.H.T. Short CB OBE

Insignia
- Tactical Recognition Flash

- Arm Badge: from 12th Dragoons
- Abbreviation: 9/12 L

The 9th/12th Royal Lancers (Prince of Wales's) was a cavalry regiment of the British Army, formed in 1960 by the amalgamation of the 9th Queen's Royal Lancers and the 12th Royal Lancers. In the later years of its existence, the regiment served as a formation reconnaissance regiment, equipped with the Combat Vehicle Reconnaissance (Tracked) family of vehicles and was attached to the 7th Armoured Brigade, the Desert Rats. The regiment was based in South Wigston, Leicestershire, along with its affiliated Territorial Army unit, B (Leicestershire and Derbyshire Yeomanry) Squadron, The Royal Yeomanry. It was amalgamated with the Queen's Royal Lancers on 2 May 2015 to form the Royal Lancers.

== History ==
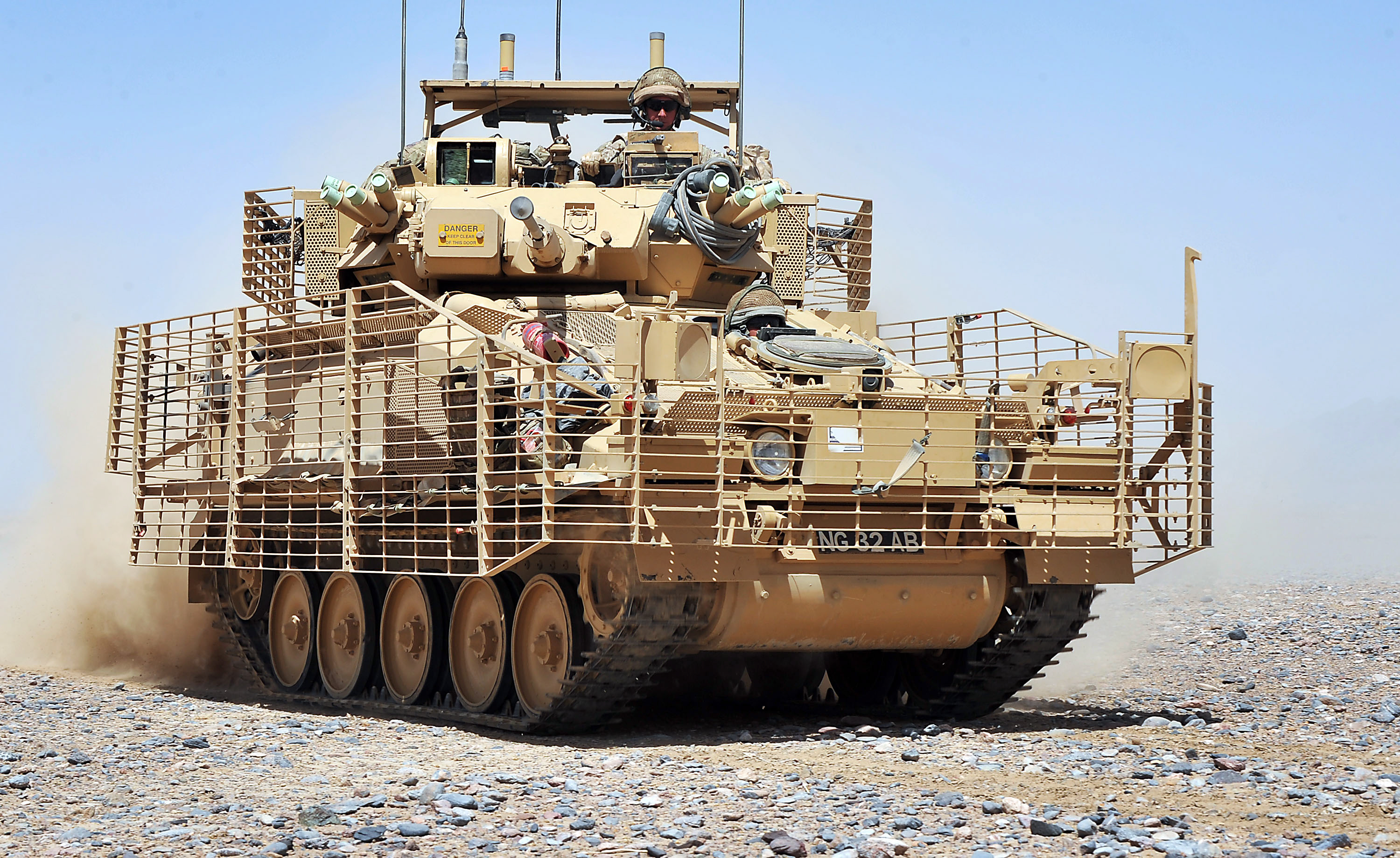
Combat Vehicle Reconnaissance (Tracked) vehicle being operated in Afghanistan by soldiers of the 9th/12th Royal Lancers

The amalgamation of the 9th Queen's Royal Lancers and the 12th Royal Lancers took place on 11 September 1960 in Tidworth Garrison Church. The inscription reads:

"Here on the 11 September 1960, 9th/12th Royal Lancers (Prince of Wales's) was formed by the 9th Queen's Royal Lancers and the 12th Royal Lancers (Prince of Wales's) coming together before God. It is not the beginning but the continuing of the same until it be thoroughly finished, which yieldeth the true glory."

During 1960, the regiment was assigned Centurion tanks. On 10 May 1972, the regiment received the Freedom of Derby and in January 1975 the whole regiment was deployed to Armagh for a four-month tour during the Troubles. Squadrons were sent on tours to Cyprus in the late 1980s during the emergency there.

D Squadron deployed to the Middle East in 1991 on Operation Granby to provide battle casualty replacements. The regiment was again at the forefront in 1992 as part of the deployment to Bosnia on Operation Grapple 1.

In 1999, the regiment was deployed to Canada as the 'opposing force' for training battlegroups.

The regiment took part in Operation Telic in Iraq, providing units for Telic 3 in 2004 and then Telic 7 in 2005. It provided the Tactical Air Control Party for 16 Air Assault Brigade's deployment to Herrick 8 in the summer of 2008. It also provided a number of sub units, which were deployed on Telic 12 in 2008. In addition, the regiment provided units for Operation Herrick 14 in Afghanistan in 2011.

In 2012, as part of the Army 2020 reforms intended to reduce the size of the British Army in line with the Strategic Defence and Security Review, it was announced that the 9th/12th Royal Lancers would be amalgamated with the Queen's Royal Lancers to form a single regiment, The Royal Lancers, in 2015.

== Regimental museum ==
The Royal Lancers Museum is housed at Derby Museum and Art Gallery in the Soldier's Story Gallery, based on the collections, inter alia, of the 9th/12th Royal Lancers.

== Battle honours ==
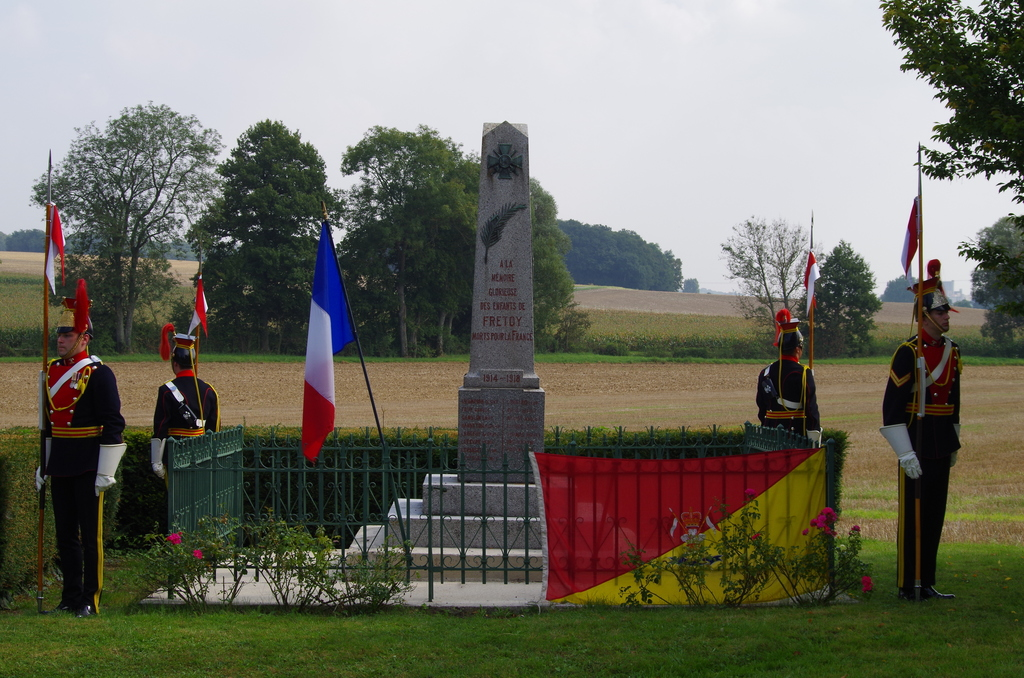
9th/12th Royal Lancers guard of honour in full dress as part of a ceremony marking the centenary of the British army's last cavalry charge, by the 9th Queen's Royal Lancers, 7 September 1914

The regiment carried the following battle honours awarded to its predecessors:

- Egypt, Salamanca, Peninsula, Waterloo, Punniar, Sobraon, Chillianwallah, Goojerat, Punjaub, South Africa 1851–53, Sevastopol, Delhi 1857, Lucknow, Central India, Charasiah, Kabul 1878, Kandahar 1880, Afghanistan 1878–80, Modder River, Relief of Kimberley, Paardeberg, South Africa 1899–1902
- Great War: Mons, Retreat from Mons, Marne 1914, Aisne 1914, Messines 1914, Ypres 1914–18, Somme 1916–18, Arras 1917, Cambrai 1917–18, Rosieres, Sambre, Pursuit to Mons
- Second World War: Dyle, Dunkirk 1940, Somme 1940, NW Europe 1940, Chor Es Sufan, Gazala, Rusweisat, El Alamein, El Hamma, Tunis, N Africa 1941–43, Lamone Bridgehead, Argenta Gap, Bologna, Italy 1944–45

== Colonels-in-chief ==
- 1960–2002: Queen Elizabeth the Queen Mother LG LT CI ONZ GCVO GBE CC RRC CD
- 2003–2015: The Duke of York KG GCVO CD ADC

== Regimental colonels ==
Colonels of the Regiment were:

- 1960–1961: Gen. Sir Richard McCreery, GCB, KBE, DSO, MC (ex 12th Royal Lancers)
- 1961–1967: Maj. (Hon. Lt-Col.) Gerald Grosvenor, 4th Duke of Westminster, DSO
- 1967–1973: Maj-Gen. Gilbert Monckton, 2nd Viscount Monckton of Brenchley, CB, OBE, MC, DL, KJStJ
- 1973–1978: Brig. Christopher Beckett, 4th Baron Grimthorpe, OBE, DL
- 1978–1982: Maj-Gen. Matt Abraham, CB, MC
- 1982–1986: Maj-Gen. John Myles Brockbank, CBE, MC
- 1986–1990: Col. Michael ffolliott Woodhead, OBE
- 1990–1995: Maj-Gen. George Michael Geoffrey Swindells, CB
- 1995–2003: Brig. Hugh William Kellow Pye
- 2003–2008: Maj-Gen. Robin Searby, CB
- 2008–2015: Maj-Gen. James Henderson Terry Short, CB, OBE

== Mons Moy ==
Mons Moy is the weekend that the regiment, both serving and old comrades, remember the fallen of all conflicts. Where commitments allow, it falls between 28 August and 7 September. On 28 August 1914, at Moy, the 12th Royal Lancers (Prince of Wales's) successfully charged against the Prussian Guard Dragoons.

== Regimental collect ==
"O Eternal God, grant to us, thy servants of the 9th/12th Royal Lancers, strength, guidance, courage, and steadfast Faith, that we may ever serve thee truly; and finally by thy mercy attain everlasting glory, through Jesus Christ our Lord – Amen".

== Freedoms ==
The Regiment received the Freedom of several locations throughout their history. These included

- (England) 5 November 2012: Northampton.

== Alliances ==
- Canada – The Prince Edward Island Regiment (RCAC)
- Pakistan – 12th Cavalry (Frontier Force)

== Affiliations ==
- B (Leicestershire and Derbyshire (Prince Albert's Own) Yeomanry) Squadron, Royal Yeomanry
- HMS Tireless
- B Squadron, Leicestershire, Northamptonshire & Rutland Army Cadet Force
- Bedfordshire & Hertfordshire Army Cadet Force
