= Martin Rutledge =

British Army general (1954–2025)

Major General Martin Rutledge CB OBE
- Born: April 1954; Birmingham, West Midlands, England
- Died: 26 October 2025 (aged 71); Dorchester, Dorset, England
- Military career
- Allegiance: United Kingdom
- Branch: British Army
- Service years: 1973–2012
- Rank: Major General
- Commands: 5th Infantry Division; 9th/12th Royal Lancers
- Awards: Companion of the Order of the Bath; Officer of the Order of the British Empire

Major General Martin John Rutledge, CB, OBE (April 1954 – 26 October 2025) was a British Army officer who commanded the 5th Division from 2008 to 2012.

== Life and career ==
Born in Birmingham, Rutledge was educated at Wadham College, Oxford, and the Royal Military Academy Sandhurst, Rutledge was commissioned into the 9th/12th Royal Lancers in 1973. He became commanding officer of his regiment in 1994. He was appointed Director, Royal Armoured Corps in 2002, chief of staff to the Adjutant General's Corps in 2005, and Kosovo Protection Corps Co-ordinator in 2007 before becoming General Officer Commanding 5th Division in 2008. He retired in 2012 and became Chief Executive of ABF – The Soldiers' Charity.

Rutledge died of cancer on 26 October 2025, at the age of 71.

Military offices
Preceded by Andrew Farquhar	General Officer Commanding 5th Division; 2008–2012	Post abolished
