= Robin Searby =

British Army general

Major General Robin Searby CB
- Born: 20 July 1947 (age 79)
- Military career
- Allegiance: United Kingdom
- Branch: British Army
- Service years: 1968–2004
- Rank: Major General
- Commands: 5th Infantry Division; 9th/12th Royal Lancers
- Conflicts: Operation Banner; Dhofar Rebellion; Bosnian War
- Awards: Companion of the Order of the Bath

Major General Robin Vincent Searby, CB (born 20 July 1947) is a retired British Army officer who commanded the 5th Division from 1996 to 1999.

== Military career ==
Educated at Leasam House School and the Royal Military Academy Sandhurst, Searby was commissioned into the 9th/12th Royal Lancers in 1968. After service in Germany, Northern Ireland and Oman, he was appointed commanding officer of his regiment in 1987. He was appointed chief of staff to the Director Royal Armoured Corps in 1989, Commander Royal Armoured Corps for 1 (British) Corps in 1991 and Commander of British Forces in the Former Republic of Yugoslavia in 1993. He went on to be President of the Army Officer Selection Board in 1993, General Officer Commanding 5th Division in 1996 and Senior British Loan Services Officer in Oman in 2000 before retiring in 2004.

In 2003 Searby was appointed colonel of the 9th/12th Royal Lancers. In 2004 he was appointed Defence Co-ordinator with Libya under an agreement to advise and train members of the Libyan Army at Sandhurst. In 2010 he became the Prime Minister's adviser on counterterrorism for North Africa.

== Family ==
In 1976 Searby married Caroline Angela Beamish; they have one son and two daughters.

Military offices
Preceded by Ian Freer	General Officer Commanding 5th Division; 1996–1999	Succeeded by Peter Grant Peterkin
