= Andrew Farquhar =

British Army general

Major General Andrew Farquhar CBE DL
- Military career
- Allegiance: United Kingdom
- Branch: British Army
- Service years: 1973–2008
- Rank: Major General
- Commands: 5th Infantry Division; 15th Infantry Brigade; 1st Battalion the Green Howards
- Conflicts: Operation Banner; Iraq War
- Awards: Commander of the Order of the British Empire; Queen's Commendation for Valuable Service; Officer of the Legion of Merit (United States)

Major General Andrew Peter Farquhar, CBE, DL is a retired British Army officer who commanded the 5th Division from 2005 to 2008.

== Military career ==
Educated at Pocklington School, the University of Sheffield and the Royal Military Academy Sandhurst, Farquhar was commissioned into the Green Howards in 1973. He became commanding officer of the 1st Battalion the Green Howards in 1994. He was appointed commander of the 15th Infantry Brigade in 2000, Deputy Commanding General of the Multi-National Force – Iraq in 2004 and General Officer Commanding 5th Division in 2005 before retiring in 2008.

Farquhar was appointed a Member of the Order of the British Empire in 1980, awarded a Queen's Commendation for Valuable Service in 1996 "in recognition of gallant and distinguished services in Northern Ireland", advanced to Commander of the Order of the British Empire in the 2003 Birthday Honours, and appointed an Officer of the United States Legion of Merit in 2005.

== Civic and charitable role ==
In retirement Farquhar became a management consultant. He is also a Deputy Lieutenant of Staffordshire.

Military offices
Preceded by Andrew Graham	Deputy Commanding General Multi-National Corps – Iraq; 2004–2005	Succeeded by Mark Mans
Preceded by Nicholas Cottam	General Officer Commanding 5th Division; 2005–2008	Succeeded by Martin Rutledge
