= Mervyn Janes =

British Army officer

Major-General Mervyn Janes CB MBE
- Born: 1 October 1920
- Died: 7 December 2008 (aged 88)
- Military career
- Allegiance: United Kingdom
- Branch: British Army
- Service years: 1942–1973
- Rank: Major-General
- Commands: 5th Infantry Division
- Conflicts: Second World War; Dhofar Rebellion
- Awards: Companion of the Order of the Bath; Member of the Order of the British Empire

Major-General Mervyn Janes, CB, MBE (1 October 1920 – 7 December 2008) was a British Army officer who commanded the 5th Division from 1970 to 1971.

== Military career ==
Educated at Sir Walter St John's Grammar School For Boys, Janes was commissioned into the Royal Artillery in 1942 during the Second World War. He was appointed Commander, Royal Artillery in 1965, Deputy Military Secretary in 1967 and General Officer Commanding 5th Division in 1970 before becoming Director Royal Artillery in 1971. As Director Royal Artillery he visited Oman during the closing stages of the operation to remove communist forces following the Dhofar Rebellion. He retired in 1973.

Military offices
Preceded by Walter Thomas	General Officer Commanding 5th Division; 1970–1971	Division disbanded (Post next held by Ian Freer)
