= Thomas Humphreys (British Army officer) =

British Army general (1878–1955)

Lieutenant-General Sir Thomas Humphreys KCB CMG DSO
- Born: 5 November 1878; Dover, Kent, England
- Died: 15 January 1955 (aged 76); West Malling, Kent
- Military career
- Allegiance: United Kingdom
- Branch: British Army
- Service years: 1898–1937
- Rank: Lieutenant-General
- Commands: 5th Infantry Division; Staff College, Quetta; 7th Indian Infantry Brigade
- Conflicts: Second Boer War; First World War
- Awards: Knight Commander of the Order of the Bath; Companion of the Order of St Michael and St George; Distinguished Service Order

Lieutenant-General Sir Edward Thomas Humphreys, KCB, CMG, DSO (5 November 1878 – 15 January 1955) was a British Army officer who commanded the 5th Division from 1931 to 1934.

== Early life and education ==
Humphreys was born in Dover, Kent, the son of Thomas Humphreys and Jeannette Napoli Cotman. He was educated at Charterhouse School and the Royal Military College, Sandhurst.

== Military career ==
Humphreys was commissioned into the Lancashire Fusiliers as a second lieutenant on 7 May 1898, and was promoted to lieutenant on 1 April 1899. He served in the 2nd Battalion, which was posted to South Africa in December 1899 after the outbreak of the Second Boer War. In South Africa he was adjutant of the Mounted Infantry Battalion, and was promoted to captain on 5 October 1901. Humphreys served in South Africa throughout the war, which formally ended in June 1902 after the Peace of Vereeniging, and returned to the posting as regular officer in the 2nd Battalion of his regiment in late September 1902. He joined other officers and men of the battalion who left Cape Town on the SS Britannic in October that year, and was stationed at Aldershot after their return.

Humphreys served in the First World War in France and then with the Egyptian Expeditionary Force, latterly as a brigade commander. After the war he became commander of the 7th Indian Infantry Brigade, before being appointed deputy director of military operations and intelligence at the War Office in 1925. He relinquished this position in January 1928 and went on to be commandant of the Staff College, Quetta, in India in 1928 and General Officer Commanding 5th Division in 1931 before retiring in 1937.

He was appointed a Companion of the Order of the Bath (CB) in the 1923 Birthday Honours.

Military offices
Preceded by C. A. C. Goodwin	Commandant of the Staff College, Quetta; 1928–1931	Succeeded by Roger Wilson
Preceded by Walter Kirke	GOC 5th Division; 1931–1934	Succeeded by Geoffrey Howard
