= Sandy Thomas (British Army officer) =

New Zealand-born British Army officer

Major-General Sandy Thomas CB DSO MC & Bar ED
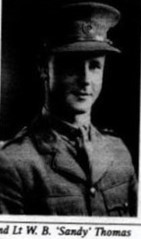
- Born: 29 June 1919; Motueka, New Zealand
- Died: 22 October 2017 (aged 98); Beaudesert, Queensland, Australia
- Military career
- Allegiance: New Zealand; United Kingdom
- Branch: New Zealand Military Forces (1940–46); British Army (1946–72)
- Service years: 1940–1972
- Rank: Major-General
- Nickname: "Sandy"
- Commands: Far East Land Forces (1970–71); 5th Division (1968–70); 23rd Battalion (1944–45)
- Conflicts: Second World War; Battle of Greece; Battle of Crete; Italian Campaign; Mau Mau Uprising
- Awards: Companion of the Order of the Bath; Distinguished Service Order; Military Cross & Bar; Efficiency Decoration; Mentioned in Despatches (2); Silver Star (United States)

Major-General Walter Babington "Sandy" Thomas, CB, DSO, MC & Bar, ED (29 June 1919 – 22 October 2017) was a New Zealand-born British Army officer, who served as General Officer Commanding Far East Land Forces from 1970 to 1971. He previously served with the New Zealand Military Forces in the Second World War, where he was decorated, wounded and, at age 24, became the youngest New Zealand battalion commander of the war.

== Military career ==
Thomas was born in Motueka, New Zealand, on 29 June 1919. He was commissioned into the New Zealand Military Forces at the outbreak of the Second World War. During his service in the Middle East, Thomas was wounded, became a prisoner of war in Crete, escaped from a prison hospital, fled to Syria, and was awarded the Military Cross and Bar. As a temporary major he received the Distinguished Service Order in 1943, and rose to command the 23rd Battalion in Italy to become, at age 24, the youngest New Zealand battalion commander in the war. Thomas ended the war as a lieutenant colonel, and was awarded the United States Silver Star.

After the war Thomas obtained a commission in the Royal Hampshire Regiment and, in 1955, he was mentioned in despatches while dealing with the Mau Mau Uprising in Kenya. He was appointed General Officer Commanding 5th Division in 1968, and Chief of Staff at Headquarters Far East Land Forces in April 1970, before being elevated to be General Officer Commanding Far East Land Forces in October. Thomas was appointed a Companion of the Order of the Bath in 1971, and retired in 1972.

Thomas died at his home in Beaudesert, Queensland, on 22 October 2017 at the age of 98.

== Bibliography ==
- Thomas, W. B. Sandy (2005). Dare to be Free. Phoenix. ISBN 978-0-304-36639-2.
- Thomas, W. B. Sandy (2004). Pathways to Adventure. Dryden Press. ISBN 978-0476006119.
- Thomas, W. B. Sandy (2006). Mask of Evil & The Black Trees. Temple House. ISBN 978-1-921206-29-0.

Military offices
Recreated Title last held by Geoffrey Musson	General Officer Commanding the 5th Division; 1968–1970	Succeeded by Mervyn Janes
Preceded by Sir Peter Hunt	GOC Far East Land Forces; 1970–1971	Post disbanded
