= Geoffrey Howard (British Army officer) =

British Army officer

Lieutenant-General Sir Geoffrey Howard KCB CMG DSO
- Born: 14 December 1876; Stone, Worcestershire, England
- Died: 3 October 1966 (aged 89); Eton, Berkshire, England
- Military career
- Allegiance: United Kingdom
- Branch: British Army
- Service years: 1897–1938
- Rank: Lieutenant-General
- Service number: 13267
- Unit: Essex Regiment
- Commands: 5th Infantry Division; 9th Infantry Brigade; 145th Brigade
- Conflicts: Second Boer War; First World War; Arab revolt in Palestine
- Awards: Knight Commander of the Order of the Bath; Companion of the Order of St Michael and St George; Distinguished Service Order

Lieutenant-General Sir Geoffrey Weston Howard, KCB, CMG, DSO (14 December 1876 – 3 October 1966) was a British Army officer who commanded the 5th Division from 1934 to 1937.

== Military career ==
Howard was commissioned as a second lieutenant into the 4th (Worcestershire Militia) Battalion, Worcestershire Regiment, in October 1895, before transferring to the Essex Regiment in December 1897.

He served with the 1st Battalion of his regiment in South Africa during the Second Boer War. The battalion was present at the operations around Colesberg in January 1900, following which he was promoted to lieutenant on 29 January 1900; then took part in the battle of Paardeberg (February 1900) and the subsequent march to Bloemfontein, during which he was aide-de-camp (ADC) to Brigadier General Theodore Stephenson. His battalion joined the force that subsequently went to occupy Pretoria, and took part in the engagement at the Vet River, and the battles of Diamond Hill (June 1900) and Belfast (August 1900).

For his service in the war, he was awarded the Distinguished Service Order (DSO) in the October 1902 South African honours list.

After the war ended in May 1902, Howard stayed in South Africa as ADC to Stephenson, who was now Major-General in Command at Bloemfontein district.

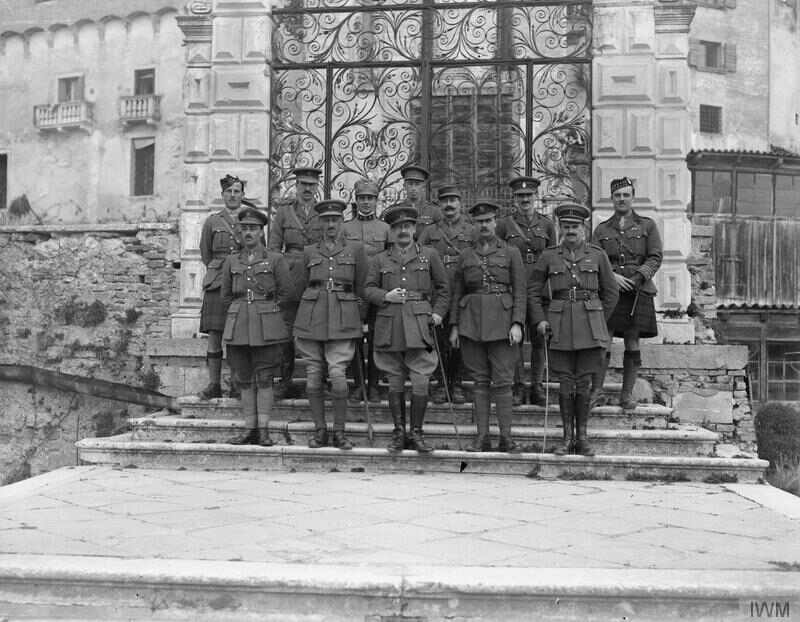
Major-General T. H. Shoubridge (centre, front), GOC 7th Division, and his staff, standing on the steps of his headquarters, Italy, 1918. To his right is his GSO1, Lieutenant Colonel G. W. Howard.

He was promoted to captain in December 1907.

Howard served in the First World War in Malta, France and Italy. On 1 September 1915 he was promoted to major. In October 1916 he was appointed as general staff officer, grade 1 of the 7th Division and was promoted to temporary lieutenant colonel while so employed. In October 1918, at the end of the war, he was made commander of the 48th (South Midland) Division's 145th Infantry Brigade.

He was promoted to brevet colonel in June 1919 and was appointed deputy director for organisation at the War Office in 1921, general staff officer at Aldershot Command in 1924, was placed on half-pay on 1 April 1924, and was commander of the 9th Infantry Brigade in 1927. After receiving a promotion to major general in March 1931, he went on to be major general in charge of administration at Eastern Command in June 1931 and in March 1934 became general officer commanding of the 5th Division, which he led in Egypt, Palestine and Transjordan during the Arab revolt in 1934 before retiring from the army in 1938. He had been promoted to lieutenant general in February 1937.

Howard was made colonel of the Essex Regiment from 1935 to 1946.

== Family ==
In 1905 Howard married Meta Minnie Gregory; they had a son and a daughter.

Military offices
Preceded by Thomas Humphreys	GOC 5th Infantry Division; 1934–1937	Succeeded by Guy Williams
Honorary titles
Preceded by John Harding-Newman	Colonel of the Essex Regiment; 1935–1946	Succeeded by Graham Wilmer
