= John Milne (British Army officer) =

British Army general

Major-General John Milne, CB (born 13 October 1946) is a former senior British Army officer. He was Commander of the 1st Artillery Brigade from 1992 to 1993; Director of Army Recruiting from 1994 to 1997; Deputy Commander of Logistics for the Stabilisation Force in Bosnia Herzegovina in 1997; Director for Support, Allied Land Forces, Central Europe (1998–99) and Chief of Staff, Kosovo Force, Pristina (1999–2000). He was appointed a Companion of the Order of the Bath in 2000 and Colonel Commandant of the Royal Artillery in 2001 (retiring in 2007); between 2001 and 2008, he was also Registrar of St Paul's Cathedral.

Other offices
Preceded by Robert Acworth	Registrar, St Paul's Cathedral; 2001–2008	Succeeded by Nicholas Cottam
