= Nicholas Cottam =

British Army general

Major General Nicholas Cottam CB OBE
- Born: 17 February 1951 (age 75)
- Military career
- Allegiance: United Kingdom
- Branch: British Army
- Service years: 1973–2008
- Rank: Major General
- Commands: 5th Infantry Division
- Conflicts: Operation Banner
- Awards: Companion of the Order of the Bath; Officer of the Order of the British Empire; Mentioned in Despatches

Major General Nicholas Jeremy Cottam, CB, OBE (born 17 February 1951) is a retired senior British Army officer who served as Military Secretary and thereafter Registrar of St Paul's Cathedral.

== Early life ==
Cottam is the son of Brigadier Donald Cottam. He was educated at Durham University, where he gained a degree in Modern History. Cottam was President of the Durham Union for Easter term of 1972.

== Military career ==
Cottam was commissioned into the Royal Green Jackets in 1973. He became commanding officer of his regiment and was deployed to Northern Ireland in the early 1990s, being appointed an Officer of the Order of the British Empire and mentioned in despatches for his service there. In 1994 he went to South Africa as part of a Commonwealth Peace Keeping Force.

Cottam became Director of Personnel Services for the Army in 2001, and went on to be General Officer Commanding 5th Infantry Division in 2003. He became Military Secretary in 2005. In that role he increased the retirement age for officers in the Territorial Army to 60, and carried out a review of the reserves, recommending that they be used for augmentation as much as for maximum effort.

== Cathedral Registrar ==
In 2008, after retirement from the army, Cottam became Registrar of St Paul's Cathedral. In this position he returned to global prominence during the 2011–2012 Occupy London protests outside the cathedral buildings. He led the public response of the cathedral community to the protests, and made public statements on the resignations of three members of the cathedral's clergy, including the Revd Canon Dr Giles Fraser; Cottam was reported to have been angered by Fraser's decision not to support agreed policy and to resign his position. Cottam retired in September 2015.

Military offices
Preceded by Arthur Denaro	General Officer Commanding 5th Division; 2003–2005	Succeeded by Andrew Farquhar
Preceded by Freddie Viggers	Military Secretary; 2005–2008	Succeeded by Mark Mans
Other offices
Preceded by John Milne	Registrar, St Paul's Cathedral; 2008–2015	Succeeded by Emma Davies
