= Guy Williams (British Army officer) =

British Army general (1881–1959)

General Sir Guy Williams KCB CMG DSO
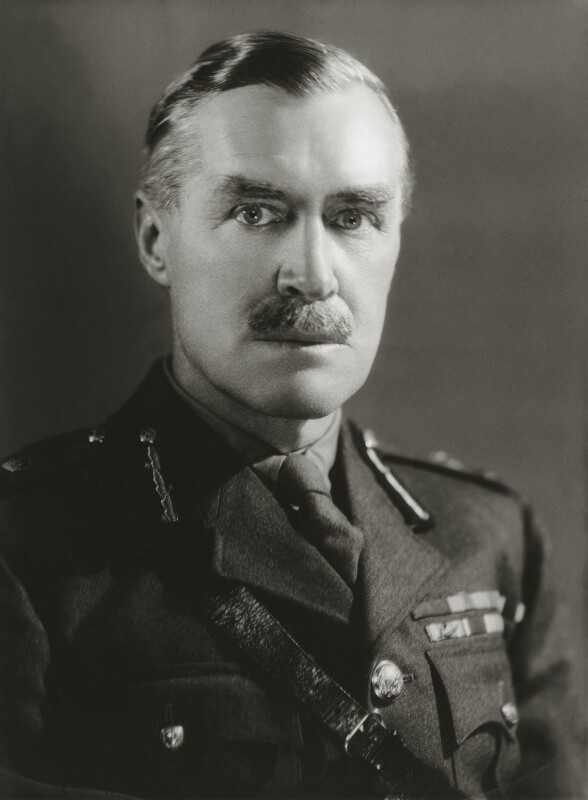
- Williams in 1938
- Born: 10 September 1881; Bangalore, British India
- Died: 2 February 1959 (aged 77)
- Military career
- Allegiance: United Kingdom
- Branch: British Army
- Service years: 1901–1941
- Rank: General
- Service number: 8372
- Unit: Royal Engineers
- Commands: Eastern Command (1938–41); 5th Infantry Division (1937–38); Staff College, Quetta (1934–37); 8th Brigade (1927–28); 199th Brigade (1918)
- Conflicts: Second Boer War; First World War; Arab revolt in Palestine; Second World War
- Awards: Knight Commander of the Order of the Bath; Companion of the Order of St Michael and St George; Distinguished Service Order; Mentioned in Despatches (7)

General Sir Guy Charles Williams, KCB, CMG, DSO (10 September 1881 – 2 February 1959) was a British Army officer who served as general officer commanding-in-chief (GOC-in-C) Eastern Command during the Second World War.

== Military career ==
Born in Bangalore in British India on 10 September 1881, Guy Williams was sent to England where he was educated at Sherborne School. He later attended the Royal Military Academy, Woolwich, where he was commissioned as a second lieutenant into the Royal Engineers and, after serving briefly in the Second Boer War, served in the First World War. His service in the war was outstanding, being mentioned in dispatches seven times and awarded the Distinguished Service Order in 1915 and, in 1918, after being promoted to temporary brigadier general at the age of 36, commanding the 199th Brigade of the 66th Division, where he had previously been Commander Royal Engineers (CRE). He was promoted to brevet lieutenant colonel in January 1918.

After attending the Staff College, Camberley, graduating in 1919, Williams was appointed deputy military secretary at the War Office in 1923 and the commander of the 8th Brigade in 1927. In 1928 he became an instructor at the Imperial Defence College and then Engineer in Chief at Aldershot Command. In 1934 he was appointed commandant of the Staff College, Quetta, in India, and in 1937 he became general officer commanding (GOC) of the 5th Division. The division was then stationed in Palestine during the Arab revolt.

Williams served in the Second World War as GOC-in-Chief Eastern Command from 1938 to 1941, when he was appointed military adviser to the New Zealand Government: he retired later that year.

== Bibliography ==
- Smart, Nick (2005). Biographical Dictionary of British Generals of the Second World War. Barnesley: Pen & Sword. ISBN 1844150496.

Military offices
Preceded by Roger Wilson	Commandant of the Staff College, Quetta; 1934–1937	Succeeded by Brodie Haig
Preceded by Geoffrey Howard	GOC 5th Infantry Division; 1937–1938	Succeeded by Harold Franklyn
Preceded by Sir Edmund Ironside	GOC-in-C Eastern Command; 1938–1941	Succeeded by Laurence Carr
Honorary titles
Preceded by Sir Ronald Charles	Chief Royal Engineer; 1946–1951	Succeeded by Sir Edward Morris
