= Walter Kirke =

British Army general

General Sir Walter Kirke GCB CMG DSO
- General Sir Walter Kirke in 1937
- Born: 19 January 1877; Portsea Island, Hampshire, England
- Died: 2 September 1949 (aged 72)
- Military career
- Allegiance: United Kingdom
- Branch: British Army
- Service years: 1896–1940
- Rank: General
- Commands: Home Guard (1939–1940); Territorial Army (1936–1939); Western Command (1933–1936); 5th Infantry Division (1929–1931)
- Conflicts: First World War; Second World War
- Awards: Knight Grand Cross of the Order of the Bath; Companion of the Order of St Michael and St George; Companion of the Distinguished Service Order; Mentioned in Despatches

General Sir Walter Mervyn St George Kirke, GCB, CMG, DSO (19 January 1877 – 2 September 1949) was the Commander in Chief of the British Home Forces at the beginning of the Second World War.

== Military career ==
Born the second son of Colonel St. George Mervyn Kirke of the Royal Engineers and his wife Sarah, Walter Kirke was commissioned into the Royal Artillery as a second lieutenant on 21 September 1896. He was promoted to lieutenant on 21 September 1899, and to captain on 4 December 1901 while serving in Waziristan on the North West Frontier of India between 1901 and 1902. From July 1902 he was seconded for service with the Burma Military Police.

Kirke was instrumental in creating the Army's Intelligence Corps in 1907, and he worked for Colonel George Macdonogh in the War Office's Intelligence Department. This area of work comprised special duties, such as protective security, ciphers and censorship of post (news) and telegraphs. Starting 1 October 1909, the new Secret Service Bureau (MI5) was created and fell under Macdonogh's supervision. Here, Kirke came to know Major Vernon Kell (headed up counter-espionage) and Captain Mansfield Cumming (enemy intelligence). Together, Cumming and Kell formed the two halves of MI5. Macdonogh and Kirke, who in February 1914 was promoted to brevet major, travelled to France and spent two weeks on a walking tour of the French and Belgium borders, visiting areas that looked vulnerable to a German attack. On 12 August 1914, the Intelligence Corps crossed the English Channel, near Le Havre, France as part of the deployment of the B.E.F.

Kirke served in the First World War as a General Staff Officer at GHQ in France and Belgium. In 1916 he learned that German soldiers were intercepting British field telephone conversations and acted to secure them. On 23 March 1918, Kirke was flown in from the front to brief the War Cabinet in London on Operation Michael. In late 1918 he became deputy director of Military Operations at the War Office and was then moved to Aldershot in 1922. He was promoted to major general on 1 January 1924.

In 1924 he was appointed Head of the British Military Mission to Finland and in 1925 President of Inter-Allied Commission of Investigation for Hungary. In 1926 Kirke became Deputy Chief of the General Staff for India, moving on to be General Officer Commanding 5th Division in 1929.

He was promoted to lieutenant general in June 1931 and in 1933 he was appointed General Officer Commanding-in-Chief for Western Command. In 1936 he became director general of the Territorial Army.

Kirke served in the Second World War, initially as inspector general of Home Defence and then as Commander-in-Chief, Home Forces. In that role he always thought that the threat of a German invasion was exaggerated. He retired in 1940. He was also an Aide-de-Camp General to the King from 1937 to 1940.

Military offices
New command Division reformed (Post last held by Hugh Jeudwine)	GOC 5th Division; 1929–1931	Succeeded by Thomas Humphreys
Preceded by Sir Cyril Deverell	GOC-in-C Western Command; 1933–1936	Succeeded by Sir Henry Jackson
