= Ian Freer (British Army officer) =

British Army general

Major General Ian Freer CB CBE
- Born: 18 May 1941 (age 85)
- Military career
- Allegiance: United Kingdom
- Branch: British Army
- Service years: 1961–1996
- Rank: Major General
- Service number: 468998
- Commands: 5th Infantry Division; Wales and Western District
- Conflicts: Operation Banner
- Awards: Companion of the Order of the Bath; Commander of the Order of the British Empire

Major General Ian Lennox Freer, CB, CBE (born 18 May 1941) is a retired British Army officer who commanded the 5th Division from 1995 to 1996.

== Military career ==
Freer was educated at George Watson's College, Edinburgh, then attended the Royal Military Academy Sandhurst. He was commissioned into the Staffordshire Regiment in 1961. He was appointed Chief of British Mission to Soviet Forces in Europe in 1989 and then served as Commander Land Forces in Northern Ireland from 1991 to 1994 during The Troubles. He went on to be General Officer Commanding Wales and Western District in 1994 and General Officer Commanding 5th Division in 1995 before retiring in 1996.

Freer was appointed colonel of the Staffordshire Regiment from 1990 to 1995.

On his retirement in 1996 Freer settled in Melbourne, Australia, and became chairman of Ocean Software.

Military offices
| Preceded by Michael Regan | General Officer Commanding Wales and Western District; 1994–1995 | Command disbanded |
| New command Division Reformed (Post last held by Mervyn Janes) | General Officer Commanding the 5th Division; 1995–1996 | Succeeded by Robin Searby |
