= Matt Abraham =

British military officer (1919–2001)

Major-General Matt Abraham CB MC
- Born: 26 January 1919
- Died: 15 May 2001 (aged 82)
- Military career
- Allegiance: United Kingdom
- Branch: British Army
- Service years: 1939–1973
- Rank: Major-General
- Conflicts: Second World War
- Awards: Companion of the Order of the Bath; Military Cross

Major-General Sutton Martin O’Heguerty Abraham CB MC (26 January 1919 – 15 May 2001) was a British military officer who served as Director of Combat Development at the Ministry of Defence.

== Career ==
Abraham was born to Captain Edgar Abraham, of the Indian Civil Service, and Ruth Eostre Abraham. Educated at Eton and Trinity College, Cambridge, he was commissioned into the 12th Royal Lancers in 1939. He won two MCs within a year during operations in the Western desert in 1942. He personally destroyed a German anti-tank gun and then took the surrender of 63 German soldiers. He went on to be Director of Combat Development at the Ministry of Defence in 1968 and chief of the Joint Services Liaison Organisation in the British Army of the Rhine in 1971 before retiring in 1973.

He served as Colonel of the 9th/12th Royal Lancers, 1977-1981.

== Notes ==
- Abraham's entry in Who's Who
