= HMS Tireless =

Two submarines of the British Royal Navy have been named HMS Tireless:

- HMS Tireless (P327) was a Taciturn- or T-class submarine that served during the Cold War
- HMS Tireless (S88) is a Trafalgar-class submarine, decommissioned on 19 June 2014
