= 5th Infantry Division (United Kingdom) =

British Army formation

5th Division; 5th Infantry Division
- Shoulder sleeve insignia of the 5th Division, 1995 onwards
- Active: 1810–1815; 1906–1922; 1929–1947; 1958–1960; 1968–1971; 1995–2012
- Country: United Kingdom
- Branch: British Army
- Type: Infantry
- Nicknames: The Globe Trotters; The Gypsies; The Fighting Fifth
- Engagements: Napoleonic War; Peninsula War; Battle of Bussaco; Battle of Sabugal; Siege of Almeida; Battle of Badajoz; Battle of Salamanca; Battle of Vitoria; Siege of San Sebastian; Battle of Nivelle; Battle of the Nive; Battle of Quatre Bras; Battle of Waterloo; First World War; Western Front; Battle of Mons; Battle of Le Cateau; First Battle of Ypres; Second Battle of Ypres; Battle of the Somme; Battle of Passchendaele; Battle of Vimy Ridge; Battle of Épehy; Second World War; Italian campaign; Operation Husky; Western Front; North West Europe campaign

Insignia
- c. 1939–Cold War period

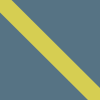
- c. First World War

The 5th Infantry Division was a regular army infantry division of the British Army. It was established by Arthur Wellesley, 1st Duke of Wellington for service in the Peninsular War, as part of the Anglo-Portuguese Army, and was active for most of the period since, including the First World War and the Second World War and was disbanded soon after. The division was reformed in 1995 as an administrative division covering Wales and the English regions of West Midlands, East Midlands and East. Its headquarters were in Shrewsbury. It was disbanded on 1 April 2012.

== Peninsular War ==
During the Peninsular War, the 5th Division, which was under the command of General James Leith, was present at most of the major engagements, including the Battle of Bussaco, the Battle of Sabugal, the Siege of Almeida, the Battle of Badajoz, the Battle of Salamanca, the Battle of Vitoria, the Siege of San Sebastian, the Battle of Nivelle and the Battle of the Nive.

=== Peninsular War order of battle ===
The order of battle in summer 1813 was:

- 1st Brigade
  - 3/1st (Royal Scots) Regiment of Foot
  - 1/9th (Norfolk) Regiment of Foot
  - 1/38th (1st Staffordshire) Regiment of Foot (from June 1812)
  - 2/38th (1st Staffordshire) Regiment of Foot (to December 1812)
  - 2/47th (Lancashire) Regiment of Foot (from October 1813)
  - 1 Coy., Brunswick-Oels Jaegers
- 2nd Brigade
  - 1/4th (King's Own) Regiment of Foot
  - 2/4th (King's Own) Regiment of Foot (May to December 1812)
  - 2/30th (Cambridgeshire) Regiment of Foot
  - 2/44th (East Essex) Regiment of Foot
  - 2/47th (Lancashire) Regiment of Foot (to October 1813)
- Portuguese Brigade
  - 1/3rd Infantry Regiment, Portuguese Army
  - 2/3rd Infantry Regiment, Portuguese Army
  - 1/15th Infantry Regiment, Portuguese Army
  - 2/15th Infantry Regiment, Portuguese Army
  - 8th Caçadores Battalion, Portuguese Army

== Waterloo Campaign ==
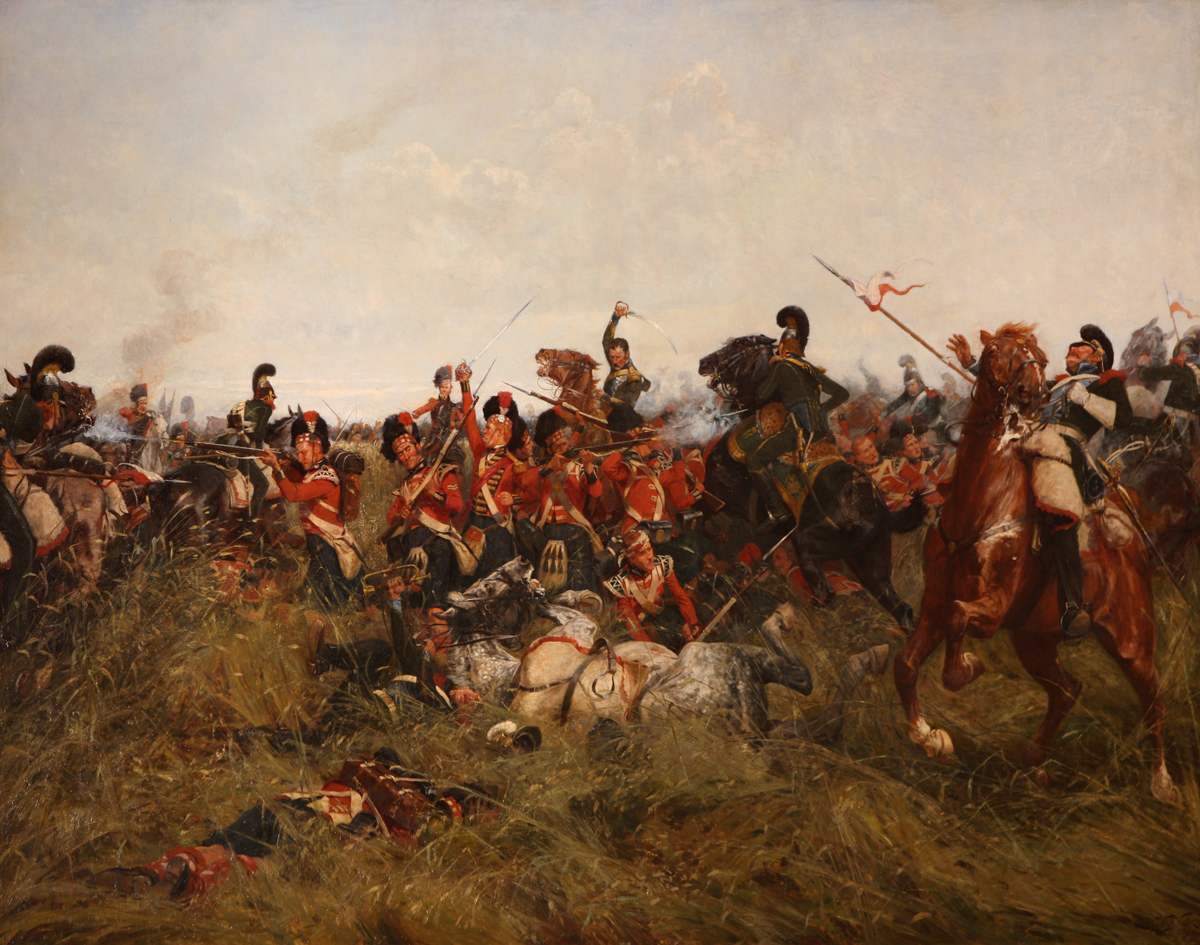
Black Watch at Quatre Bras

The division was also present during the Waterloo Campaign, first seeing action at the Battle of Quatre Bras, then at the Battle of Waterloo under the command of Lieutenant General Sir Thomas Picton.

=== Waterloo order of battle ===
The division's order of battle at Waterloo was as follows:

- 8th British Brigade, Major-General Sir James Kempt
  - 1/28th (North Gloucestershire) Regiment of Foot
  - 1/32nd (Cornwall) Regiment of Foot
  - 79th Regiment of Foot (Cameron Highlanders)
  - 1/95th Regiment of Foot (Rifles)
- 9th British Brigade, Major-General Sir Dennis Pack
  - 3/1st Regiment of Foot (Royal Scots)
  - 42nd (Royal Highland) Regiment of Foot "Black Watch"
  - 2/44th (East Essex) Regiment of Foot
  - 92nd Regiment of Foot (Gordon Highlanders)
- 5th Hanoverian Brigade, Colonel Ernst von Vincke
  - Landwehr Battalion Gifhorn
  - Landwehr Battalion Hameln
  - Landwehr Battalion Hildesheim
  - Landwehr Battalion Peine
- Artillery, Major Heinrich Heise
  - Roger's Battery, Royal Artillery
  - Braun's Battery, Hanoverian Foot Artillery

== Second Boer War ==
On the outbreak of war in 1899, an Army Corps of three divisions was sent to South Africa from the UK; the troops already there constituted the 4th Division. The rapid deterioration of the situation led the War Office to announce on 11 November 1899 that a 5th Division was to be formed and sent out. This consisted of the 10th and 11th (Lancashire) Brigades and concentrated at Estcourt on 8 January 1900. Under the command of Lieutenant-General Sir Charles Warren, 5th Division joined up with the Natal Field Force shortly after the Battle of Colenso and was a part of the relieving army of the besieged Ladysmith.

=== Second Boer War order of battle ===
The division was constituted as follows:

10th Brigade

- Commanded by Major-General John Talbot Coke.
- 2nd Battalion Dorset Regiment
- 2nd Battalion Middlesex Regiment
- 2nd Battalion Somerset Light Infantry
- Yorkshires and Warwickshires being left at Cape Colony
- Imperial Light Infantry joined later

11th (Lancashire) Brigade

- Initially commanded by Major-General Edward Woodgate, who was wounded at Spion Kop and died shortly afterwards. He was succeeded by Major-General Arthur Wynne who was later wounded at the Battle of the Tugela Heights and was temporarily succeeded by Brigadier-General Walter Kitchener.
- 2nd Battalion Kings Own Royal Lancasters
- 2nd Battalion Lancashire Fusiliers
- 1st Battalion South Lancashire Regiment
- 1st Battalion York and Lancaster Regiment

Royal Field Artillery

- 13th, 67th and 69th Batteries – already in Natal

Royal Engineers

- 37th Company

== First World War ==
=== 1914 ===
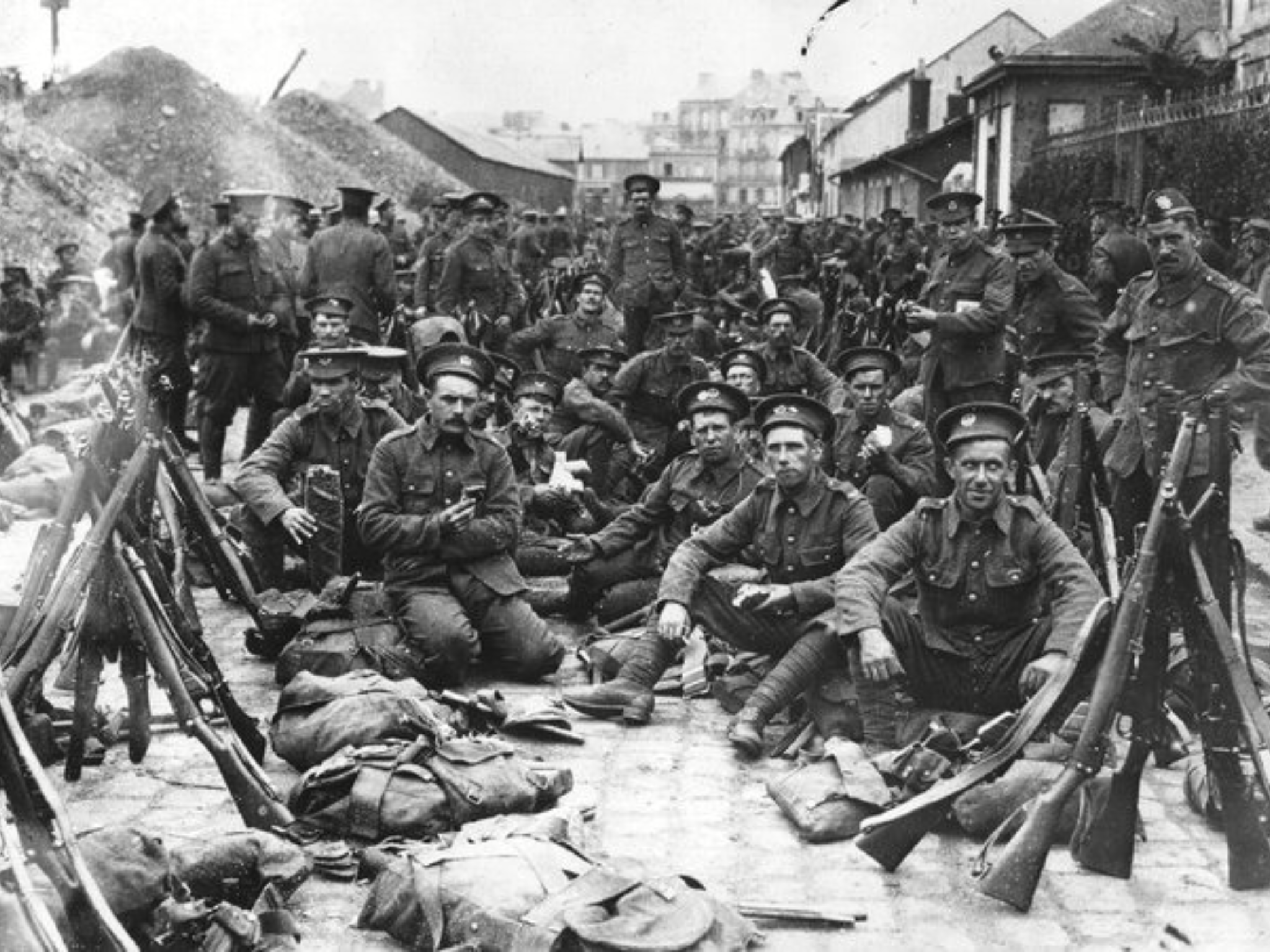
Tommies of the 1st Battalion, Cheshire Regiment, at Mons, August 1914.

Under the command of Major General Sir Charles Fergusson, who had taken over as GOC 5th Division from Major General William Pitcairn Campbell in February 1913, the division, a key component of II Corps, was part of the original British Expeditionary Force (BEF) that deployed to France in the summer of 1914, and where it would remain for the rest of the war, except for a brief period on the Italian Front from 27 November 1917 to 1 April 1918.

The division saw action in several pivotal battles, including the Battle of Mons (23-24 August) and the subsequent retreat, where it engaged in the Action of Élouges (24 August) and the Battle of Le Cateau (26 August). Continuing to play a significant role in the war effort, the division participated in the First Battle of the Marne (7-10 September), the First Battle of the Aisne (12-15 September), and the Battle of La Bassée (10 October – 2 November). Following Fergusson's controversial removal by Field Marshal Sir John French, commander-in-chief of the BEF, Major-General Thomas Morland took command, and elements of the division saw action at Messines (12 October – 2 November) and Armentières (13 October – 2 November). In November, the division took part in the First Battle of Ypres, specifically the Battle of Nonne Bosschen (11 November).

=== 1915 ===
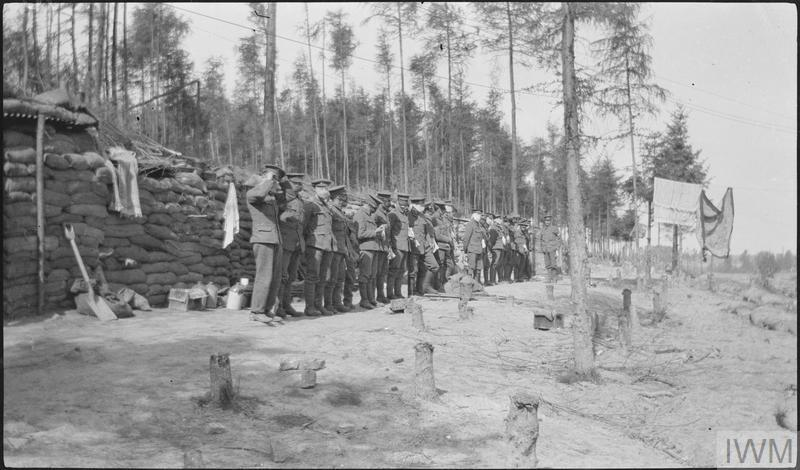
Men of the 1st Battalion, Devonshire Regiment, undergoing anti-gas respirator inspection behind breastworks just in front of the Yser Canal, spring 1915.

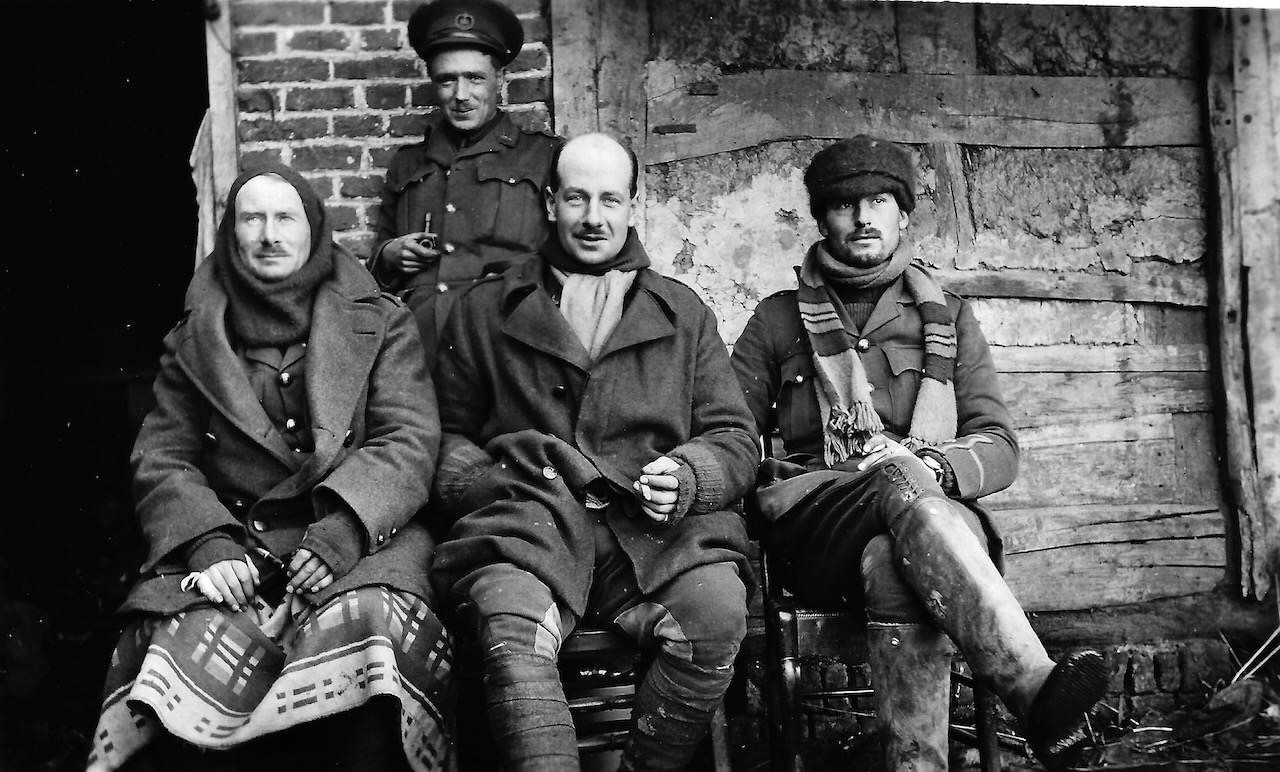
Officers of 'D' Company, 1st Battalion, Dorsetshire Regiment, at Burnt Farm, about 400 yards from Wulverghem Church and 500 yards from the front line. Left to right: Lieutenant Wheeler, Lieutenant Wood (standing), Captain R.E. Partridge, Lieutenant Morley.

In 1915, the 5th Division played a key role in several battles. It participated in the Capture of Hill 60 from 17-22 April. The division was also involved in the Second Battle of Ypres, with the 13th Infantry Brigade seeing action at the Battle of Grafenstafel (22-23 April) and the Battle of St. Julien (24 April – 4 May), both under the temporary command of V Corps.

Major-General Morland, in command for almost nine months, was promoted to a corps command on 15 July, and Major-General Charles Kavanagh, a cavalryman, took over the division.

Later in 1915, the division underwent changes, with some of its Regular units being exchanged with those from the 32nd Division, a newly arrived Kitchener's Army formation, comprising civilians who had volunteered for military service. This was done to bolster the inexperienced division with Regular Army troops, although many of the pre-war Regular units had already suffered heavily and the Regular battalions were by now actually largely composed of new recruits.

=== 1916 ===
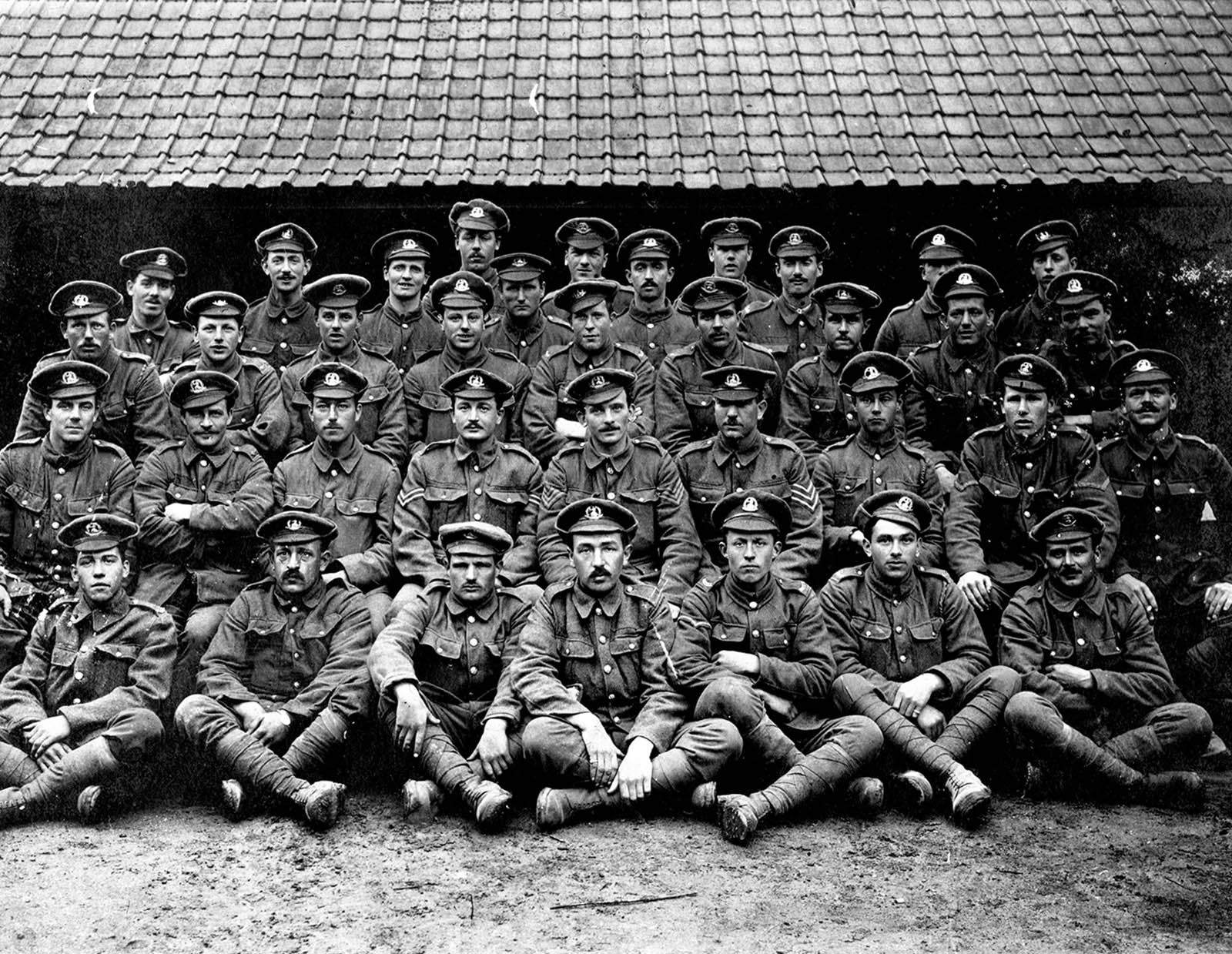
Tommies of the 1st Battalion, Norfolk Regiment in France, May 1916.

In March 1916, the 5th Division redeployed to the Arras sector, assuming control of the front line stretching from St. Laurent Blangy to the southern edge of Vimy Ridge. The area was a hotbed of activity, with frequent trench raids, sniping incidents, and mining operations.

Major-General Reginald Stephens took command on 1 April from Major-General Kavanagh, who went to command a corps.

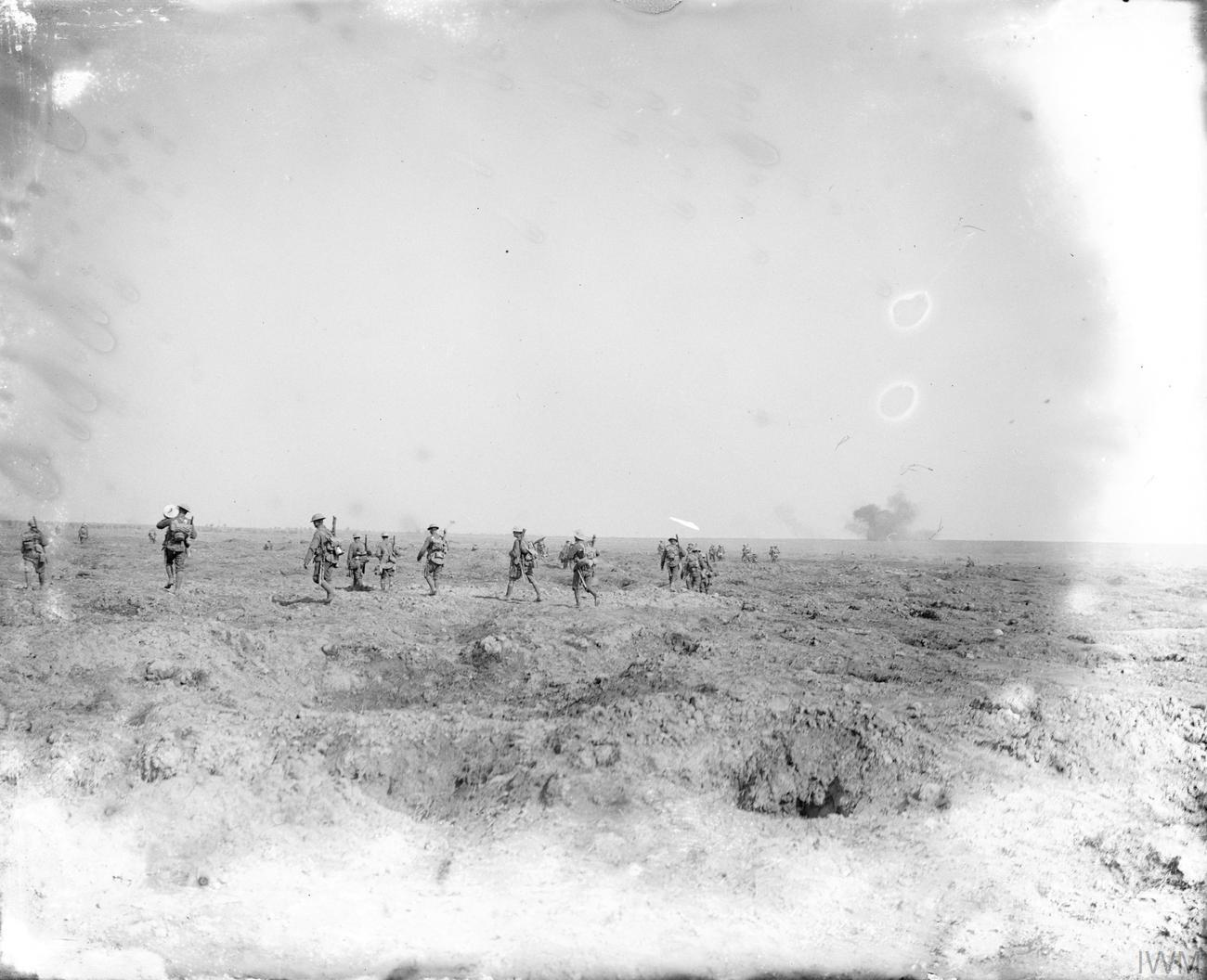
Men of the 12th (Service) Battalion, Gloucestershire Regiment ("Bristol's Own") moving up in support in open order near Ginchy, France, 25 September 1916.

As the Franco-British offensive on the Somme commenced on 1 July, the 5th Division was withdrawn to the BEF's general headquarters reserve for rest and refurbishment. The division subsequently participated in several key Somme battles, including:

- Attacks on High Wood (XV Corps, 20-25 July)
- Guillemont (XIV Corps, 3-6 September)
- Flers–Courcelette (XIV Corps, 15-22 September)
- Morval (XIV Corps, 25-28 September)

By early October, the division had relocated to the Festubert sector, where it endured a relatively calm period, punctuated by occasional artillery and sniper fire, which lasted until March 1917.

=== 1917 ===
The 5th Division played a key role in several battles in 1917, including the Battle of Arras in April and the Third Battle of Ypres, which began in late July. The 5th fought at Vimy Ridge under the Canadian Corps (9-14 April), at the Attack on La Coulotte (23 April), and the Third Battle of the Scarpe (3-4 May).

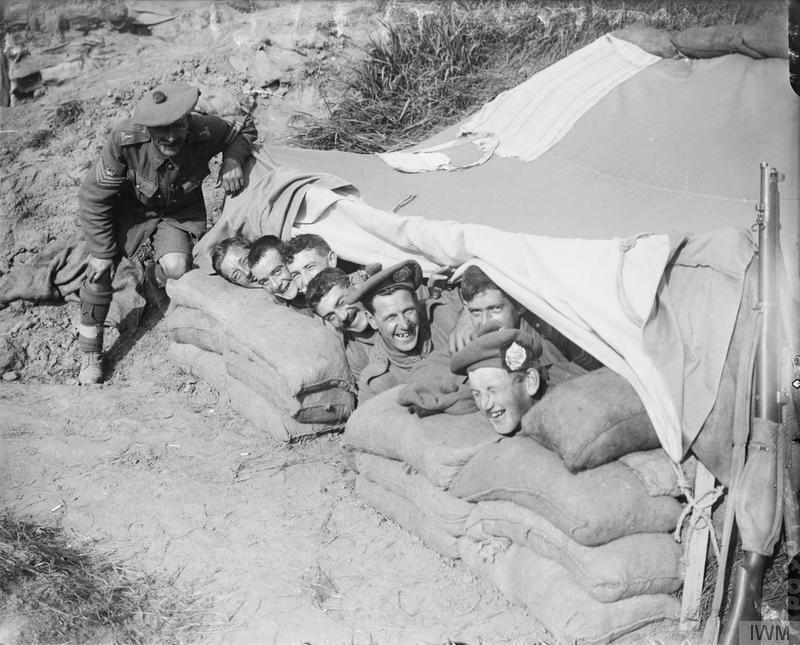
Men of the 1/6th (Renfrewshire) Battalion, Argyll and Sutherland Highlanders, the divisional pioneers, resting beneath a tarpaulin, Ypres–Comines Canal, Belgium, 1 October 1917.

After several months in the Arras area, they were relieved and sent to Flanders for the Third Battle of Ypres, where they fought at Polygon Wood (26 September – 3 October), Broodseinde (4 October), Poelcapelle (9 October), and the Second Battle of Passchendaele (26 October – 10 November).

The division was then selected as one of ultimately five British divisions to be sent from the Western Front to the Italian Front, a move agreed upon by the British government to support Italian forces after the disaster at Caporetto in late October. Many British soldiers described the move to Italy as "like another world" after the harsh conditions of Passchendaele.

The division prepared to move to the Brenta mountains but eventually took up positions along the River Piave in late January 1918. Together with the 41st Division (which had also been sent from the Western Front to Italy, like the 5th), they were later recalled to France in response to the German attack on 21 March, having seen no major actions in Italy.

=== 1918 ===
In 1918, the 5th Division fought in the Battles of the Lys, specifically the Battle of Hazebrouck (12-15 April) under XI Corps, where they defended Nieppe Forest.

A leadership change occurred on 15 July, with Major General John Ponsonby succeeding Major General Stephens, who was promoted to command a corps.

The division was withdrawn for rest on 14 August and placed in GHQ Reserve. Two weeks later, they joined the “Hundred Days Offensive”, fighting through Albert, Irles, Beugny, Havrincourt, Gonnelieu, and the River Selle, eventually reaching Valenciennes and the River Sambre. They were in continuous action until late October.

The division's battles included:
The Second Battle of the Somme (August-September)

- Battle of Albert (21-23 August) under IV Corps
- Second Battle of Bapaume (31 August – 3 September) under IV Corps

The Battles of the Hindenburg Line (September-October)

- Battle of Épehy (18 September) under IV Corps
- Battle of the Canal du Nord (27 September – 1 October) under IV Corps
- Pursuit to the Selle (9-12 October) under IV Corps
- Battle of the Selle (17-25 October) under IV Corps, part of the Final Advance in Picardy

The Armistice of 11 November 1918 brought an end to the fighting on the Western Front.

=== Order of battle ===
The order of battle of the 5th Division during the Great War was as follows:

13th Infantry Brigade The 13th Brigade was temporarily under the command of the 28th Division between 23 February and 7 April 1915, when it was replaced by the 84th Infantry Brigade from that division.

- 2nd Battalion, King's Own Scottish Borderers
- 2nd Battalion, Duke of Wellington's Regiment (left January 1916)
- 1st Battalion, Queen's Own (Royal West Kent Regiment)
- 2nd Battalion, King's Own Yorkshire Light Infantry (left December 1915)
- 1/9th (City of London) Battalion (Queen Victoria's), London Regiment (joined November 1914, left February 1915)
- 14th (Service) Battalion, Royal Warwickshire Regiment (joined December 1915, became Divisional Pioneers October 1918)
- 15th (Service) Battalion, Royal Warwickshire Regiment (joined January 1916, disbanded October 1918)
- 16th (Service) Battalion, Royal Warwickshire Regiment (joined October 1918)
- 13th Machine Gun Company, Machine Gun Corps (formed 24 December 1915, moved to 5th Battalion, Machine Gun Corps 26 April 1918)
- 13th Trench Mortar Battery (formed April 1916)

14th Infantry Brigade The 14th Brigade transferred to the 32nd Division on 30 December 1915.

- 1st Battalion, Devonshire Regiment (left 12 January 1916)
- 2nd Battalion, Suffolk Regiment (left September 1914)
- 1st Battalion, East Surrey Regiment (left 12 January 1916)
- 1st Battalion, Duke of Cornwall's Light Infantry (left 12 January 1916)
- 2nd Battalion, Manchester Regiment
- 1/5th Battalion, Cheshire Regiment (joined February 1915, left November 1915)
- 1/9th (Highlanders) Battalion, Royal Scots (joined November 1915)
- 2nd Battalion, Royal Inniskilling Fusiliers (joined November 1915)
- 14th Machine Gun Company, Machine Gun Corps (formed December 1915, moved to 5th Battalion, Machine Gun Corps 26 April 1918)
- 14th Trench Mortar Battery (formed April 1916)

15th Infantry Brigade The 15th Brigade was temporarily under the command of the 28th Division between 3 March and 7 April 1915, when it was replaced by the 83rd Brigade from that division.

- 1st Battalion, Norfolk Regiment
- 1st Battalion, Bedfordshire Regiment
- 1st Battalion, Cheshire Regiment
- 1st Battalion, Dorset Regiment (left December 1915)
- 1/6th Battalion, Cheshire Regiment (joined December 1914, left March 1915)
- 1/6th (Rifle) Battalion, The King's (Liverpool) Regiment (joined February 1915, left November 1915)
- 16th (Service) Battalion, Royal Warwickshire Regiment (joined December 1915, left October 1918)

95th Infantry Brigade The 95th Brigade transferred from the 32nd Division on 26 December 1915

- 12th (Service) Battalion, Gloucestershire Regiment (Bristol's Own) (joined December 1915, disbanded October 1918)
- 1st Battalion, Devonshire Regiment (joined January 1916)
- 1st Battalion, East Surrey Regiment (joined January 1916)
- 1st Battalion, Duke of Cornwall's Light Infantry (joined January 1916)

Artillery

- XV Brigade, Royal Field Artillery
- XXVII Brigade, Royal Field Artillery
- XXVIII Brigade, Royal Field Artillery (until 21 January 1917)
- VIII (Howitzer) Brigade, Royal Field Artillery (until 21 May 1916)
- 108th Heavy Battery, Royal Garrison Artillery (until 9 April 1915)

Engineers

- 17th Field Company, Royal Engineers (until 26 March 1915)
- 59th Field Company, Royal Engineers
- 1st South Midland Field Company, Royal Engineers (from 24 March until 10 April 1916)
- 2/1st North Midland Field Company, Royal Engineers (from 23 March until 19 May 1915)
- 1/2nd Home Counties Field Company, Royal Engineers (joined 2 February 1915; became 491st (Home Counties) Field Company 3 February 1917)
- 2nd Durham Field Company, Royal Engineers (joined 20 September 1916; became 527th (Durham) Field Company 3 February 1917)

Pioneers

- 1/6th Battalion, Argyll and Sutherland Highlanders (from 13 June 1916 until 5 October 1918)
- 14th (Service) Battalion, Royal Warwickshire Regiment (from 5 October 1918)

=== Insignia ===
The 5th Division was unusual among other British divisions in that no battle patches were worn on their tunics or helmets, aside from those briefly worn by New Army battalions bringing them from their former division.

== Between the wars ==
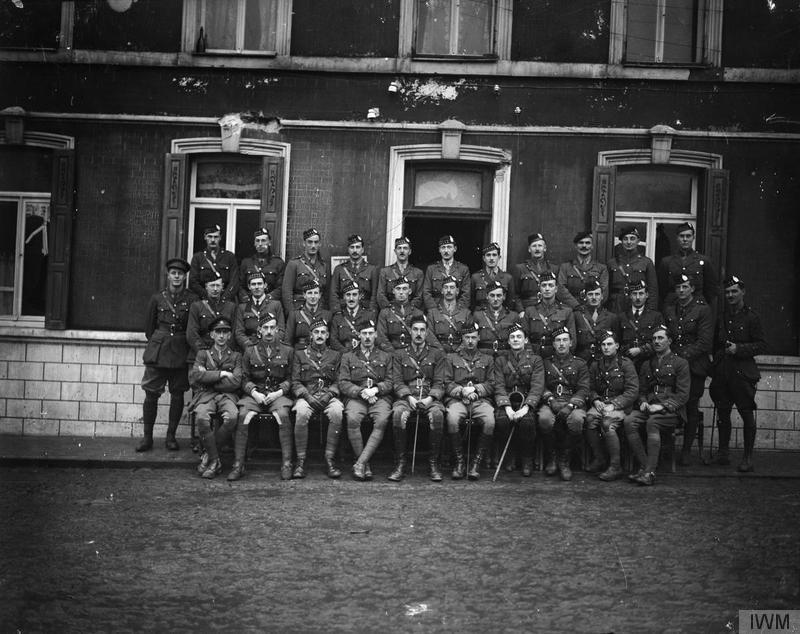
Officers of the 2nd Battalion, King's Own Scottish Borderers, Contay, 4 December 1918.

The 5th Division remained in the Le Quesnoy area until mid-December 1918, before commencing a march into Belgium on 13 December. They eventually reached the region between Namur and Wavre, where demobilisation efforts began on 22 December, continuing into early 1919 with men being released at regular intervals.

The division was later based in Egypt and then in Palestine. The latter occurred during the 1936–1939 Arab revolt in Palestine.

== Second World War ==
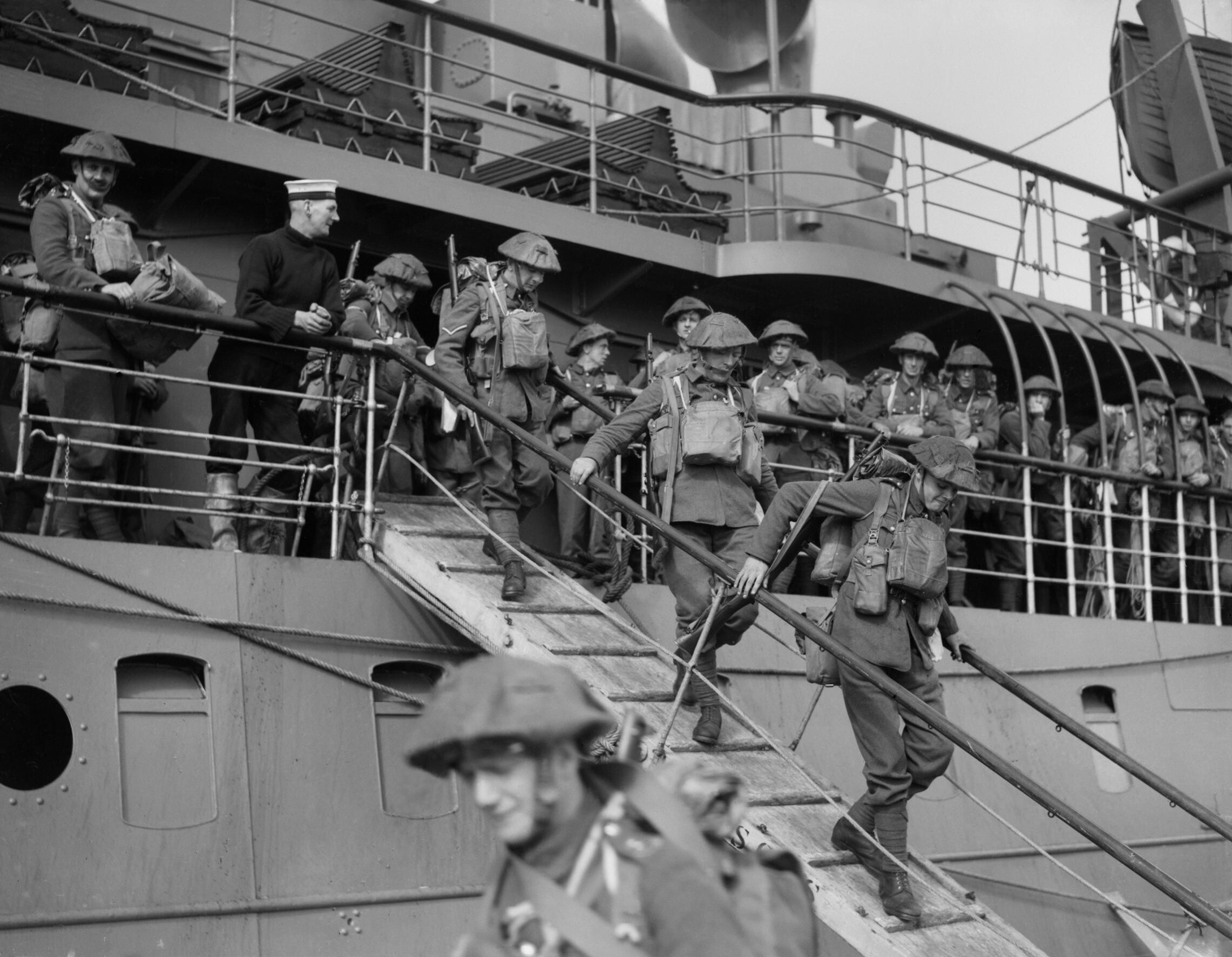
Men of the 2nd Battalion, Royal Inniskilling Fusiliers disembarking at Cherbourg, France, from the steamer 'Royal Sovereign', 16 September 1939.

Upon the outbreak of the Second World War, in September 1939, the 5th Infantry Division was a Regular Army formation, commanded by Major-General Harold Franklyn, who had been in command since 1938. The division was based at Catterick under Northern Command. Both of its infantry brigades (the 13th and 15th) went to France to join the rest of the British Expeditionary Force (BEF) in early October 1939 as independent infantry brigades, but the divisional Headquarters crossed to France on 19 December 1939, coming under the command of Lieutenant-General Alan Brooke's II Corps from 23 December. In early 1940, the division was reformed with three infantry brigades –the 13th, 15th and 17th, all commanded by men who would achieve high rank in the next few years.

=== Globe Trotting ===
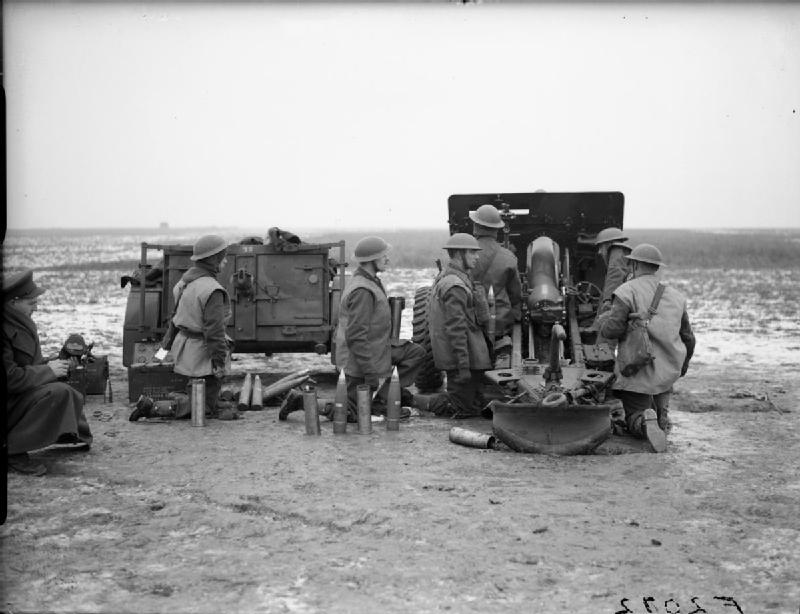
A 25-pounder of 361 Battery, 91st Field Regiment, Royal Artillery, at Oppy near Vimy, France, 7 January 1940.

Throughout the early months of 1940, the division saw some changing of units, as the Territorial Army (TA) divisions began to arrive in France from the United Kingdom. This was part of official BEF policy, based on experience from the Great War, and was intended to strengthen the inexperienced TA formations with experienced Regulars, although at the same time diluting the strength of the Regular divisions with inexperienced TA units. Despite this, the division still maintained its integrity as a Regular formation. The next few months were spent in training, although this was hampered by severe shortages of modern equipment. Due to the lack of immediate action, many soldiers believed the war would amount to very little. Despite this, morale in the division was high. This period of inactivity was known as the "Phoney War".

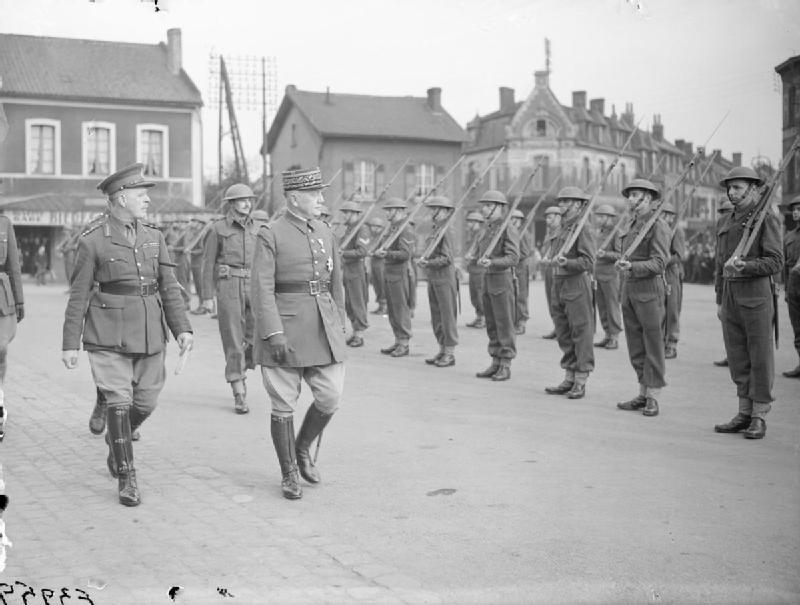
General Alphonse Georges of the French Army, accompanied by General Lord Gort, Commander-in-Chief (C-in-C) of the BEF, inspecting men of the 2nd Battalion, Royal Inniskilling Fusiliers at Bethune, France, 23 April 1940.

In mid-April, the 15th Brigade was sent to Norway and fought, very briefly, in the unsuccessful Norwegian campaign, evacuating from there and arriving in the United Kingdom in early May, although it did not rejoin the 5th Division until 3 July 1940. In early May, the 25th Infantry Brigade came temporarily under command of the division in France. The German Army launched its attack in the West on 10 May 1940 and the 5th Division saw action in the battles of Belgium and France in May–June 1940, including the Battle of Arras, supported by the 1st Army Tank Brigade, on 21 May 1940 and at the Battle of the Ypres-Comines Canal from 26 to 28 May 1940, and then was withdrawn to Dunkirk, along with the rest of the BEF, where they were evacuated to England, with most of the division arriving on 1 June. Lieutenant-General Brooke, commanding II Corps, wrote in his diary that there "is no doubt that the 5th Div in its fight on the Ypres-Comines canal saved the II Corps and the BEF".

The division, having sustained very heavy losses, remained in the United Kingdom for the next 21 months, with most of 1940 being spent in Scotland under Scottish Command, reforming in numbers and being brought up to strength with large numbers of conscripts, alongside training in anti-invasion duties and preparing for Operation Sea Lion, the German invasion of the United Kingdom which never arrived. In late March 1941 the division, now under the command of Major-General Horatio Berney-Ficklin, who had taken over in July 1940 (and previously commanded the 15th Brigade), was sent to Northern Ireland, coming under command of Lieutenant-General James Marshall-Cornwall's III Corps, under overall control of British Troops Northern Ireland, and, as in Scotland, continued training to repel a German invasion there (see Operation Green).

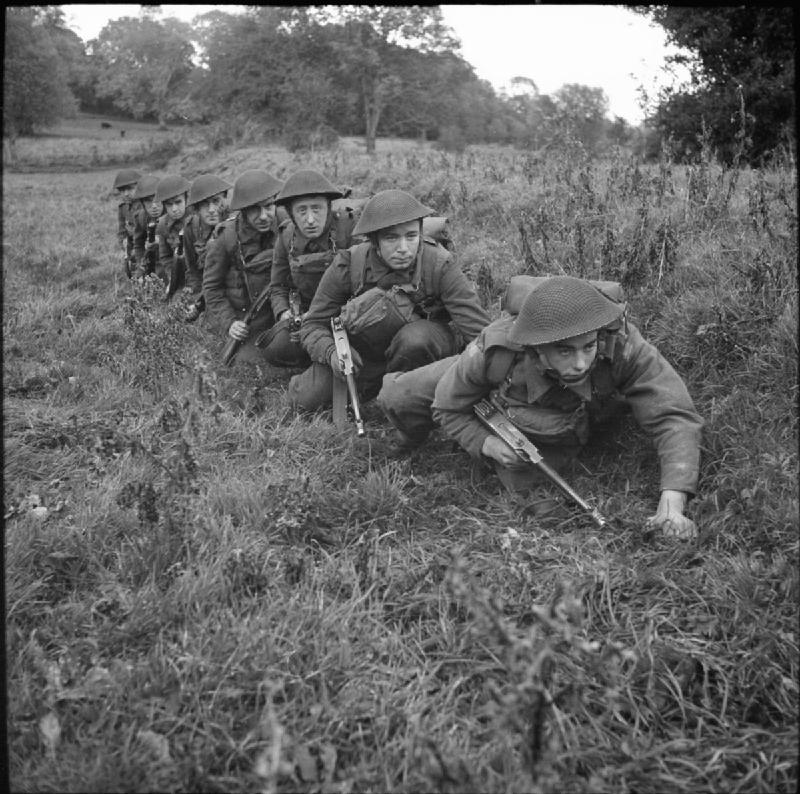
An infantry section of the 6th Battalion, Seaforth Highlanders, creep forward during exercises at Crum Castle in County Fermanagh, Northern Ireland, November 1941.

The division left Northern Ireland on 16 March 1942 and served and travelled in so many regions of the world that they were known as the Globe Trotters, and became the most travelled division of the British Army during the Second World War. In April 1942, the 13th and 17th Infantry Brigades and a portion of the divisional troops were detached to 'Force 121' for Operation Ironclad, the invasion of Vichy French held Madagascar. The division was not complete again until August 1942. It was sent from the United Kingdom to India for three months and then to Middle East Command, where it trained in mountain warfare.

In mid-February 1943, the division was sent to Syria, remaining there for the next four months, and later Egypt, where it came under the command of British XIII Corps, commanded by Lieutenant-General Miles Dempsey (who earlier had commanded the 13th Brigade in France and Belgium in 1940), which was part of the British Eighth Army, under General Sir Bernard Montgomery. The division, serving again alongside the 50th Division, began training in amphibious operations in preparation for Operation Husky, the Allied invasion of Sicily.

=== Sicily, Italy and North-Western Europe ===
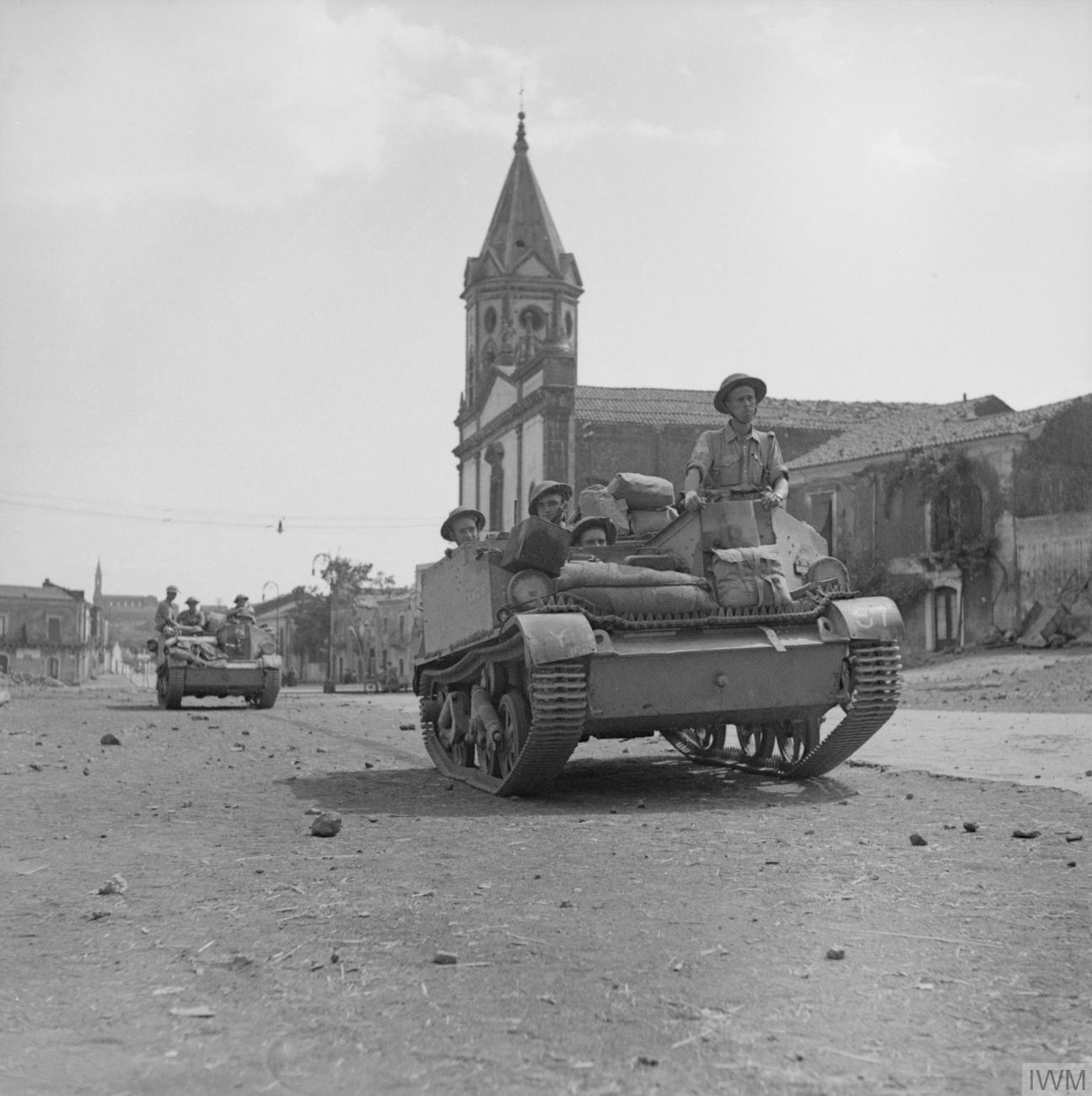
Universal carriers of the 2nd Battalion, Wiltshire Regiment pass through Pedara, Sicily, 9 August 1943.

The 5th Division saw action during the invasion of Sicily where, towards the end of the campaign, in early August, the divisional commander, Major-General Berney-Ficklin, who had commanded the division since July 1940, was replaced by Major-General Gerard Bucknall. The division was pulled out of the line and absorbed replacements, and invaded the Italian mainland in Operation Baytown on 3 September (four years since Britain's entry into the war), still as part of XIII Corps of the Eighth Army, but now serving alongside the 1st Canadian Infantry Division, and advanced up the spine of Italy. Later in the year, the division fought in the Moro River Campaign, although sustaining relatively light casualties in comparison to the other Allied formations involved.

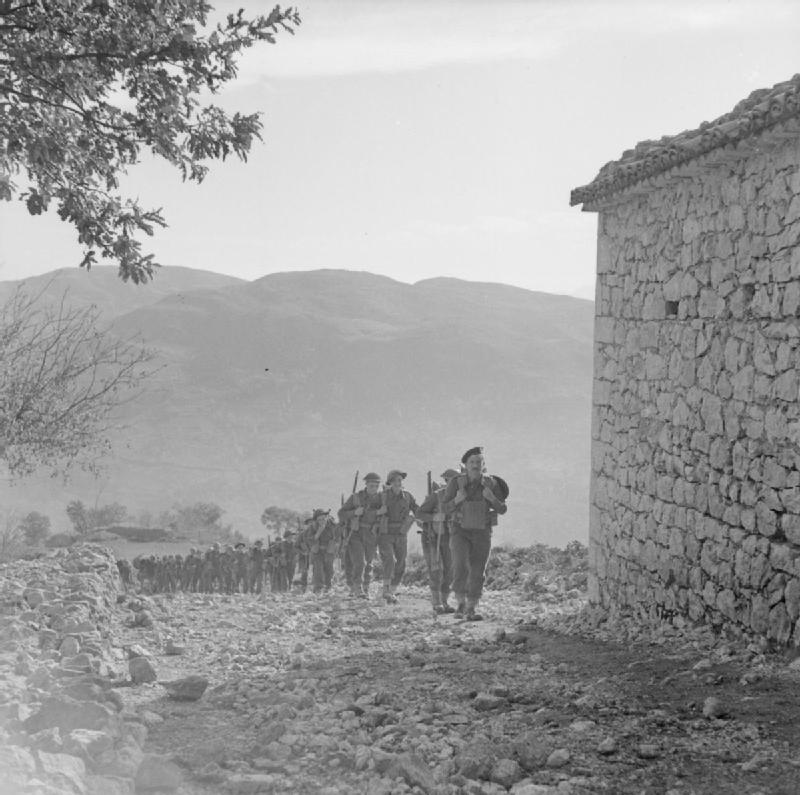
Men of the 2nd Battalion, Cameronians (Scottish Rifles) climbing a track in mountainous terrain, Italy, 21 November 1943.

Progress for the Allied Armies in Italy (AAI), commanded by General Sir Harold Alexander, towards the end of 1943 had slowed down considerably, due mainly to a combination of worsening weather, stiffening German resistance and the Winter Line (also known as the Gustav Line, a series of formidable defences the Germans had created). The Eighth Army, operating on the Adriatic coast, had already pierced the Gustav Line at its eastern end. However, the appalling weather conditions forbade further progress and so operations there were closed down. As a result, the relatively intact 5th Division was available elsewhere. Therefore, in early January 1944 the division was transferred from the Eighth Army, now under Lieutenant-General Sir Oliver Leese, to the western side of Italy to join Lieutenant-General Richard McCreery's British X Corps. X Corps, stationed along the Garigliano river, was part of Lieutenant General Mark W. Clark's U.S. Fifth Army. The division, now commanded by Major-General Philip Gregson-Ellis and with the veteran 201st Guards Brigade now under command, crossed the Garigliano river as part of the First Battle of Monte Cassino where it gained considerable territory.

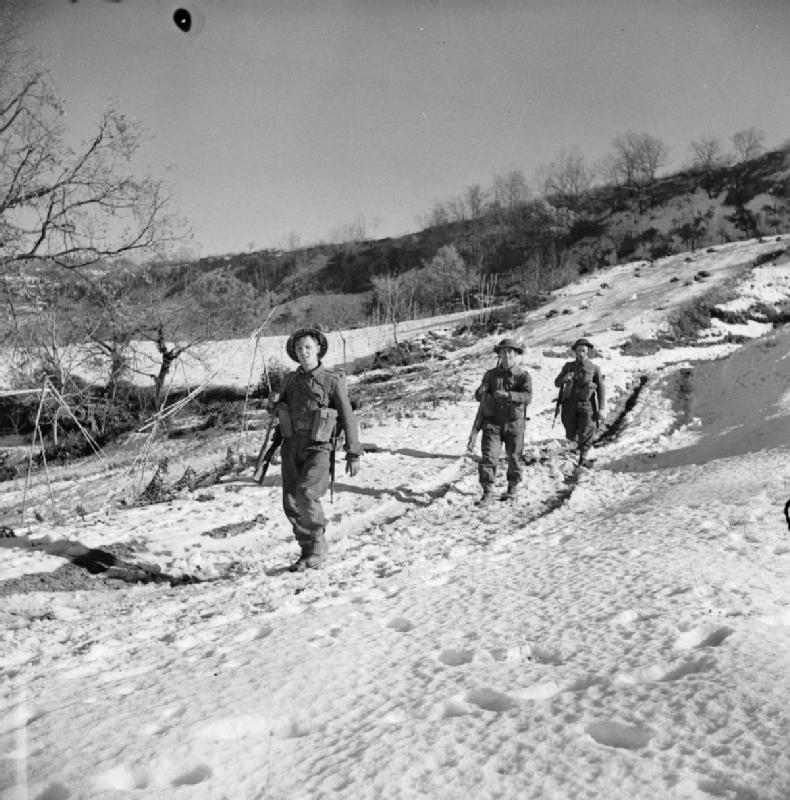
Infantrymen of the 1st Battalion, Green Howards trudge down a snow-covered hillside, Italy, on New Year's Day, 1 January 1944.

In March 1944, the division, after holding its positions that it gained during the battle, was transferred again, this time to the Anzio bridgehead (or, more appropriately, beachhead) where they came under command of Major General Lucian Truscott's U.S. VI Corps and relieved the battered 56th Division, which was returning to the Middle East. Although, by this time, the major battles for the Anzio beachhead were over, the division was involved in minor skirmishing and operating in conditions more reminiscent of the trench warfare of the First World War. In May, the division participated in Operation Diadem and the breakout from Anzio, which led to the capture of the Italian capital of Rome in early June. During the fighting, Sergeant Maurice Rogers of the 2nd Battalion, Wiltshire Regiment was posthumously awarded the Victoria Cross, the first and only to be awarded to the 5th Division during the Second World War. Soon afterwards, the division, having sustained just under 3,000 casualties since its arrival at Anzio three months before, was then withdrawn to Palestine, arriving there in mid-July. The division then came under command of Persia and Transjordan Command.

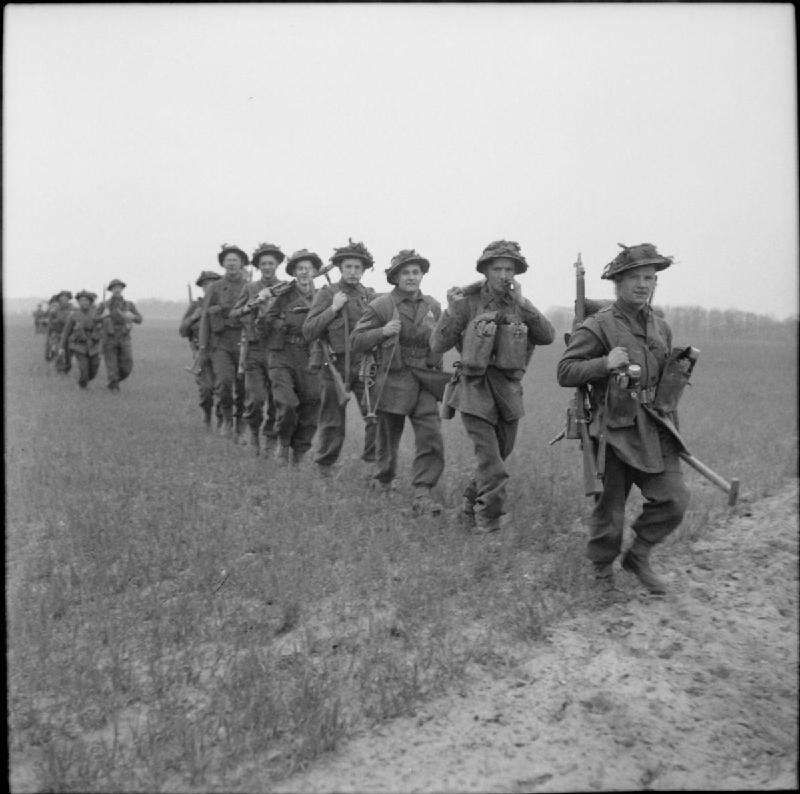
Infantrymen of the 2nd Battalion, Royal Scots Fusiliers advance in single file during operations to outflank German resistance in Uelzen, Germany, 16 April 1945.

The division, now commanded by the relatively young Major-General Richard Hull, who, at the age of 37, was the youngest division commander in the British Army (and later destined to become Chief of the General Staff and Chief of the Defence Staff), returned to Italy in early 1945 where they relieved the 1st Infantry Division, which had fought alongside the Globetrotters at Anzio. Soon afterwards, however, the division was transferred to the Western Front in March 1945 to participate in the final stages of the North West Europe campaign. Arriving in Belgium just after the British crossing of the Rhine, the division came under command of VIII Corps, under Lieutenant-General Evelyn Barker, part of the British Second Army, under Lieutenant-General Miles Dempsey, and took part in the Western Allied invasion of Germany, closely supported by elements of the 6th Guards Armoured Brigade.

Throughout the Second World War, the British 5th Infantry Division used a 'Y' on a khaki background as its insignia.

=== Order of battle ===
The 5th Infantry Division was constituted as follows during the war:
13th Infantry Brigade (detached to Force 121 in Madagascar from 26 April until 2 August 1942)

- 2nd Battalion, Cameronians (Scottish Rifles)
- 2nd Battalion, Royal Inniskilling Fusiliers (30 November 1939 to 14 August 1944)
- 2nd Battalion, Wiltshire Regiment
- 13th Infantry Brigade Anti-Tank Company (from 3 September 1939, disbanded 6 January 1941)
- 5th Battalion, Essex Regiment (from 14 August 1944)
- 13th Infantry Brigade Support Company (from 4 May 1943, left 20 June 1944)

15th Infantry Brigade

- 1st Battalion, Green Howards
- 1st Battalion, King's Own Yorkshire Light Infantry
- 1st Battalion, York and Lancaster Regiment
- 15th Infantry Brigade Anti-Tank Company (formed 29 September 1939, disbanded 6 January 1941)
- 15th Infantry Brigade Support Company (from 4 May 1943, left 14 June 1944)

17th Infantry Brigade (Brigade HQ formed 3 October 1939, detached to Force 121 in Madagascar from 15 March to 30 June 1942)

- 2nd Battalion, Royal Scots Fusiliers (from 4 October 1939)
- 2nd Battalion, Seaforth Highlanders (from 4 October 1939, left 30 March 1940)
- 2nd Battalion, Northamptonshire Regiment (from 5 October 1939)
- 17th Infantry Brigade Anti-Tank Company (formed 18 October 1939, disbanded 6 January 1941)
- 6th Battalion, Seaforth Highlanders (from 30 March 1940)
- 17th Infantry Brigade Support Company (from 4 May 1943, left 6 June 1944)

Divisional Troops

- 7th Battalion, Cheshire Regiment (machine gun battalion, from 11 November 1941)
- 3rd Battalion, Tower Hamlets Rifles (Rifle Brigade (The Prince Consort's Own)) (Reconnaissance Battalion, from 15 to 29 January 1941)
- 5th Battalion, Reconnaissance Corps (formed from 3rd Tower Hamlets Rifles, 30 January 1941, redesignated 5th Regiment 6 June 1942, became 5th Reconnaissance Regiment, Royal Armoured Corps 1 January 1944)
- 9th Field Regiment, Royal Artillery (until 7 April 1942)
- 91st (4th London) Field Regiment, Royal Artillery (until 26 April 1942, and again from 2 July 1942)
- 92nd (5th London) Field Regiment, Royal Artillery (left 30 April 1940, returned 6 June 1940)
- 97th (Kent Yeomanry) Army Field Regiment, Royal Artillery (from 14 to 31 May 1940)
- 156th (Lanarkshire Yeomanry) Field Regiment, Royal Artillery (from 29 August 1942)
- 52nd (6th London) Anti-Tank Regiment, Royal Artillery (from 28 December 1939)
- 18th Light Anti-Aircraft Regiment, Royal Artillery (from 5 February 1943)
- 245th (Welsh) Field Company, Royal Engineers (from 29 December 1939)
- 252nd (West Lancashire) Field Company, Royal Engineers (from 29 December 1939)
- 506th Field Company, Royal Engineers (until 29 January 1940)
- 38th Field Company, Royal Engineers (from 29 January 1940 until 7 April 1942, and again from 30 June 1942)
- 254th (West Lancashire) Field Park Company, Royal Engineers (from 29 December 1939)
- 18th Bridging Platoon, Royal Engineers (from 16 March 1943)
- 5th Divisional Signals Regiment, Royal Corps of Signals

== Post War and Cold War ==
The division remained in Germany, undertaking occupation duties, into the immediate post-war period. Major-General John Churcher was the final commander, taking command in July 1947 and the division was disbanded two months later in September. (Note: The Imperial War Museum stated that the division was disbanded in 1946.) In April 1958, as part of a restructure undertaken by the British Army of the Rhine (BAOR), the 7th Armoured Division was converted into and became the newly revived 5th Division and was headquartered at Verden an der Aller, Germany. This incarnation of the division lasted until 30 June 1960. The following day, 1 July, it was redesignated as the 1st Division and took on that formation's lineage and insignia.

On 1 April 1968, the Army Strategic Command was formed in the UK, with a goal of supporting NATO forces from as far north as Norway to as far south as Turkey; to provide internal security operations world-wide; and to undertake limited operations alongside allied forces. In conjunction with this command being formed, the 5th Division was resurrected at Wrexham. During this period, it consisted of the 2nd, the 8th, and the 39th Infantry Brigades. However, with the onset of Operation Banner, the deployment of British troops to Northern Ireland during The Troubles, the division was disbanded on 26 February 1971 as it was no longer needed.

== Final decades ==
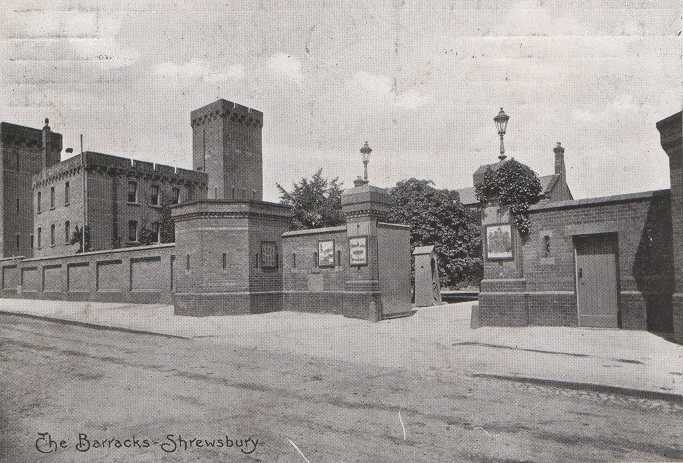
Copthorne Barracks, where the division was headquartered on reformation

During the mid-1990s, the British Army restructured and disbanded various regional districts, which were replaced by several regionally based divisions. This included the reformed 5th Division, alongside the 2nd and the 4th Divisions. These formations were all dubbed "regenerative" divisions, and held administrative and training responsibilities for all non-deployed forces located within their geographical boundaries. For the 5th Division, this included Wales, the West Midlands, and North West England. In the event of a major international crisis, the formation would be used as the core to form a combat-ready division around. On reformation (April 1995), the division was headquartered in Shrewsbury and comprised the 42nd Brigade (headquartered in Preston, Lancashire), the 143rd Brigade (Shrewsbury), and the 160th Infantry Brigades (Brecon). At the time, it was around 4,600 strong and also contained 97 artillery pieces, one multiple launch rocket system, two helicopters, and 123 tracked vehicles.

As part of its training mandate, the division dispatched troops to train in Belize, was the first British formation to undertake training operations in Slovakia, and regularly worked with the Army Cadet Force. In addition to training, the division was held responsible for environmental conservation in areas that it oversaw. It also conducted a number of UK-based humanitarian missions in the early 2000s. During Operation Waterfowl, the division assisted those effected by the Autumn 2000 Western Europe floods. In 2001, the division supported farmers across the country, as well as the Ministry of Agriculture, Fisheries and Food, during the 2001 United Kingdom foot-and-mouth outbreak (its deployment falling under the codename Operation Peninsular). The same year, it also sent troops to join the Stabilisation Force in Bosnia and Herzegovina (Operation Palatine).

By the mid-2000s, the division's boundaries had changed. The 2nd Division was assigned northern England and the 42nd Brigade. In turn, the 5th Division's area of responsibility was expanded so that it stretched from Wales, across the Midlands, and included the East of England. It also took command of the 49th (East) Brigade. (Note: Charles Heyman, a defence analyst, provides a different geographical area for the division during this period: Wales, the East Midlands, and South West England.) The opening decade of the millennium saw the outbreak of the war on terror, which resulted in British deployments to Afghanistan (Operation Herrick) and Iraq (Operation Telic and the division prepared troops for deployments to these conflicts. It also sent troops to the Falkland Islands.

The Strategic Defence and Security Review of 2010 identified that the army had had become optimised for operations in Afghanistan, but in order to meet potential future threats would need to be reorganised to become more flexible. This restructure was called Army 2020 and resulted in the decision to disband the three regional regenerative divisions, to be replaced by Support Command, with the aim of making the home-based forces better able to support any deployed troops. The 5th Division was disbanded alongside the 2nd during April 2012, with the 4th Division preceding them in January.

== See also ==
- List of commanders of the British 5th Division
- List of British divisions in World War I
- List of British divisions in World War II
- British Army Order of Battle (September 1939)
