= Lord Claud Hamilton (1843–1925) =

British politician and railway director (1843–1925)

The Right Honourable Lord Claud Hamilton PC
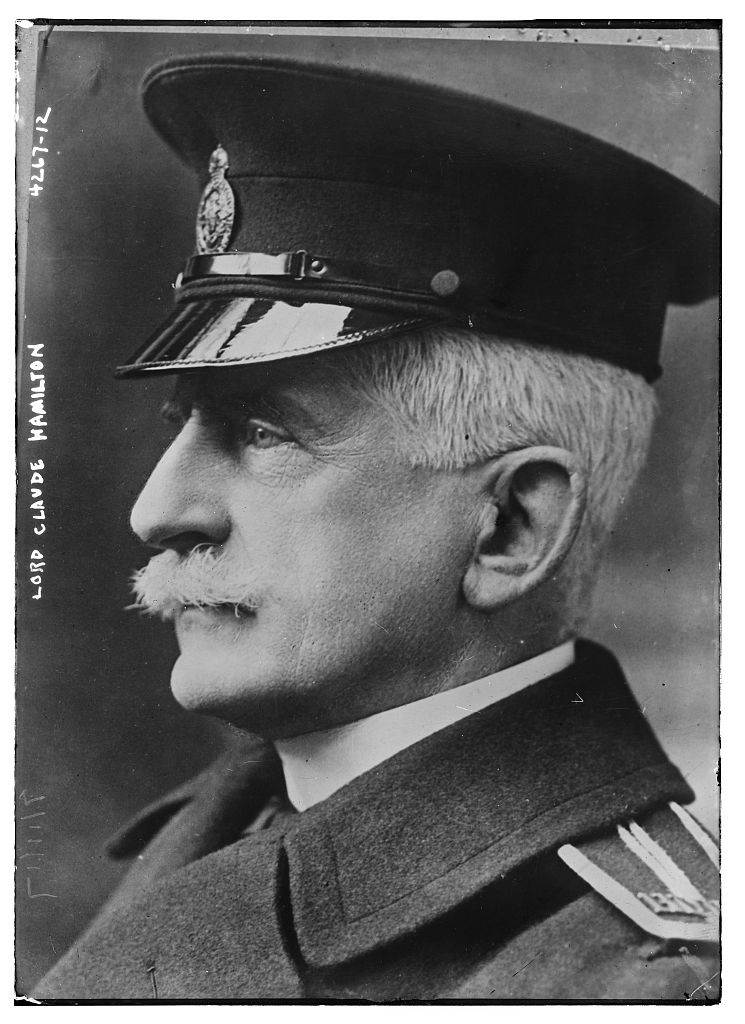
- Lord Claud Hamilton, c. 1916

Member of Parliament for Kensington South
- In office January 1910–1918

Member of Parliament for Liverpool West Derby
- In office 1885–1888

Member of Parliament for Liverpool
- In office 1880–1885

Member of Parliament for King's Lynn
- In office 1869–1880

Member of Parliament for Londonderry City
- In office 1865–1868

Personal details
- Born: 20 February 1843 Stanmore, Middlesex
- Died: 26 January 1925 (aged 81) Paddington, London, England
- Party: Conservative
- Spouse: Carolina Chandos-Pole (m. 1878; died 1911)
- Children: 2
- Parents: James Hamilton (father); Louisa Russell (mother)
- Relatives: Louisa Hamilton (sister); James Hamilton (brother); George Hamilton (brother); Albertha Hamilton (sister); Maud Hamilton (sister); Frederick Hamilton (brother); Ernest Hamilton (brother)
- Military career
- Service: British Army
- Units: Grenadier Guards; Royal Inniskilling Fusiliers

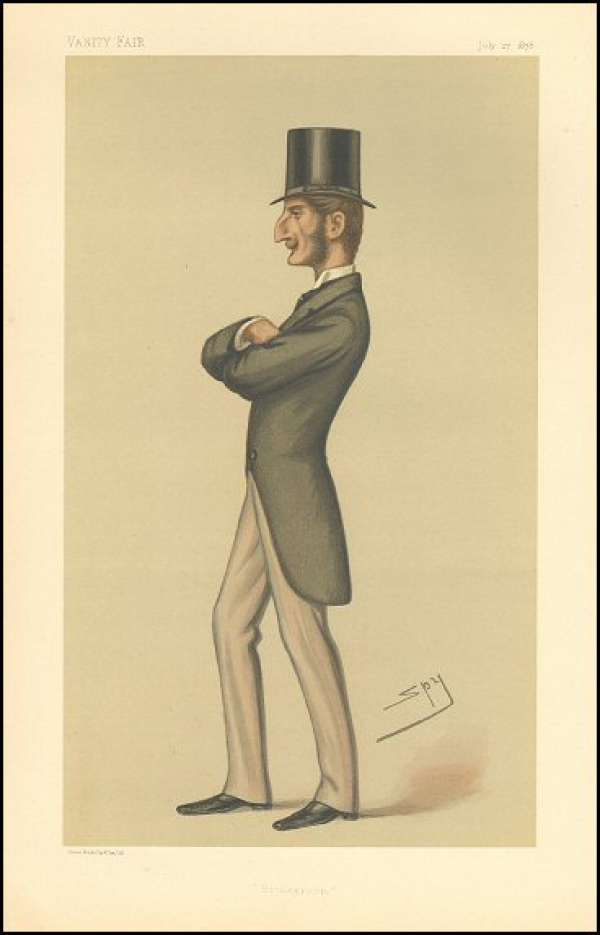
"Bridegroom". Caricature by Spy published in Vanity Fair in 1878.

Rt. Hon. Lord Claud John Hamilton PC (20 February 1843 – 26 January 1925) was a British aristocrat, Member of Parliament (MP), and a noted railway director during the Victorian era.

== Early life ==
Lord Claud was born at the Priory in Stanmore, Middlesex, the second son of James Hamilton, 2nd Marquess of Abercorn (later the 1st Duke of Abercorn) and his wife Lady Louisa Jane Russell, daughter of 6th Duke of Bedford.

He was educated at Harrow School.

== Careers ==
Before turning to political life, Hamilton served in the British Army. He purchased a commission as Ensign & Lieutenant in the Grenadier Guards on 27 May 1862, buying his promotion to Lieutenant & Captain on 8 August 1865, before retiring by sale of his commission on 8 June 1867.

On 10 July 1867 he was appointed Lieutenant-Colonel Commandant of the part-time Prince of Wales's Own Donegal Militia (later the 5th (Donegal Militia) Battalion, Royal Inniskilling Fusiliers) in succession to his uncle, Lord Claud Hamilton (1813–1884). He was appointed Honorary Colonel of the battalion on 17 January 1891, in succession to his elder brother James Hamilton, 2nd Duke of Abercorn.

In 1865, he became Conservative MP for Londonderry City until 1868 when he was appointed a Lord of the Treasury in Benjamin Disraeli's first ministry. In 1869, he became MP for King's Lynn until 1880, for Liverpool from 1880 to 1885, for Liverpool West Derby from 1885 until he resigned his seat in 1888, and for Kensington South from January 1910 to 1918.

Lord Claud had been an aide-de-camp to Queen Victoria from 1887 to 1897 and was appointed to the Privy Council in 1917.

=== Great Eastern Railway ===
However his principal contribution to British public life was as a director of the Great Eastern Railway (GER) from 1872, becoming vice-chairman in 1874, and chairman in 1893, continuing as chairman until 1922. The GER operated from London's Liverpool Street station to major eastern towns and cities including Cambridge, Norwich, Ipswich, Chelmsford, and Colchester. Hamilton travelled the network extensively. "He devoted the main energies of his life to the company, constantly travelling over the system, observing its conduct and operation". The shares of the company (which had been bankrupt in 1866) rose from 76, shortly after he became a director, to par in 1896, and the dividend to 6% in 1901.

In 1900, the Great Eastern Railway named the first of its new class of 4-4-0 express passenger locomotives (designed by James Holden and designated GER Classes S46, D56 and H88 ) after its chairman, and the whole class came to be known as the "Claud Hamilton" type.

== Personal life ==
On 20 July 1878, Lord Claud married Carolina Chandos-Pole (1857–1911), a daughter of Edward Sacheverell Chandos-Pole and Lady Anna Caroline Stanhope (daughter of the 5th Earl of Harrington). Together, they had two children:

- Gilbert Claud Hamilton (1879–1943), who fought in the Second Boer War; he married Enid Awa Elgar, daughter of Charles Elgar of Fernside, New Zealand, in 1911. After her death in 1916, he married Mary Blair, a daughter of Joseph Allan Blair of New York City, in 1916.
- Ida Hamilton (1883–1970), who married Hugh Duncombe Flower in 1909. They divorced in 1923.

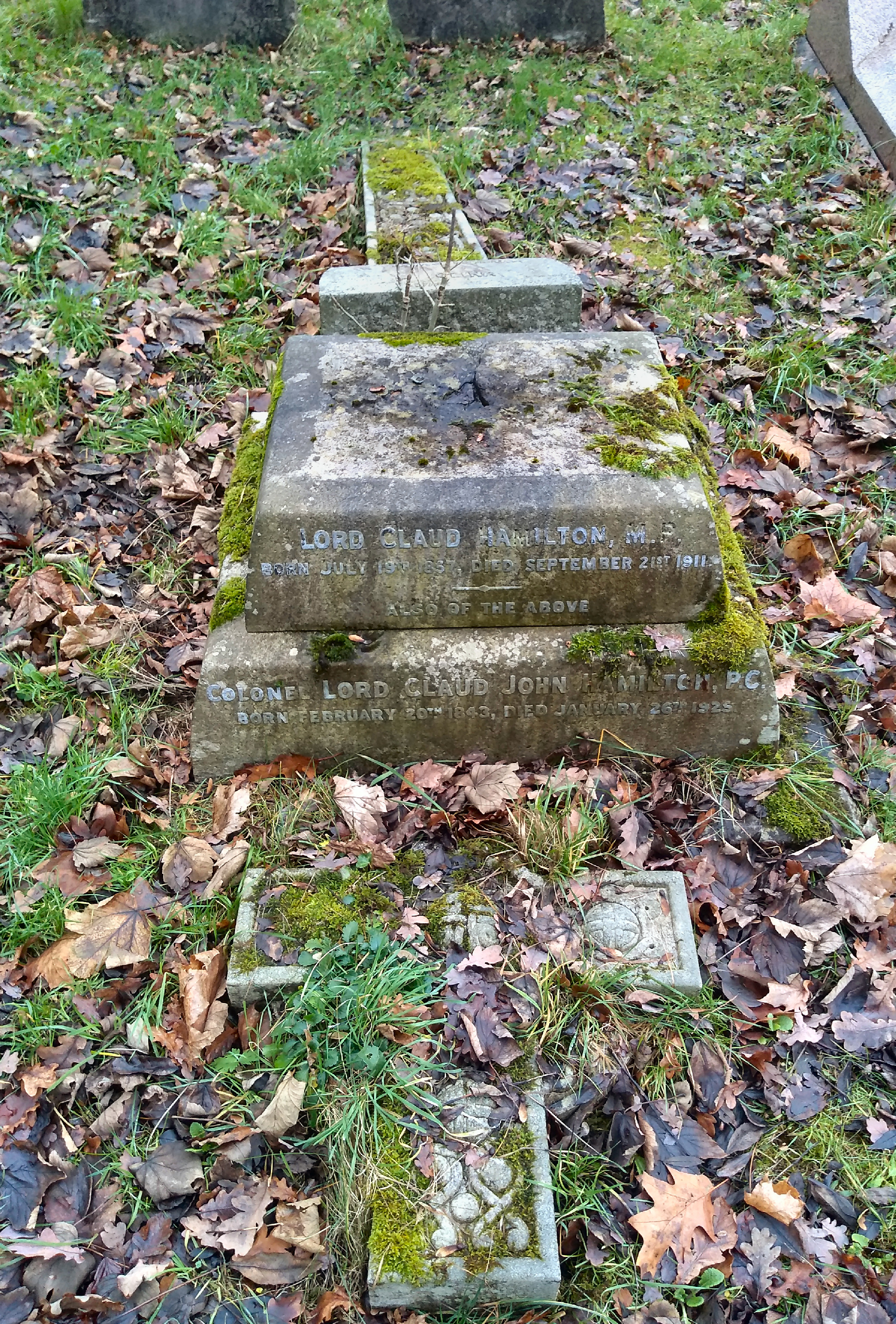
Richmond cemetery

Hamilton underwent major surgery in November 1924. He died at his London home at 28 Cambridge Square, on 26 January 1925. He was buried in Richmond Cemetery. He was 81 years of age.

== Legacy ==
A memorial was erected by Ida Flower in 1925 to the memory of her father. It can be found on the south wall of St John's-Hyde Park Church, London, W2.

== Ancestry ==
Ancestors of Lord Claud Hamilton (1843–1925)

16. Captain The Hon. John Hamilton
8. John Hamilton, 1st Marquess of Abercorn
17. Harriet Craggs
4. James Hamilton, Viscount Hamilton
18. Sir Joseph Copley, 1st Baronet
9. Catherine Copley
19. Mary Buller
2. James Hamilton, 1st Duke of Abercorn
20. James Douglas, 14th Earl of Morton
10. The Hon. John Douglas
21. Bridget Heathcote
5. Harriet Douglas
22. Edward Lascelles, 1st Earl of Harewood
11. Lady Frances Lascelles
23. Anne Chaloner
1. Lord Claud Hamilton
24. John Russell, 4th Duke of Bedford
12. Francis Russell, Marquess of Tavistock
25. The Hon. Gertrude Leveson-Gower
6. John Russell, 6th Duke of Bedford
26. Willem van Keppel, 2nd Earl of Albemarle
13. Lady Elizabeth Keppel
27. Lady Anne Lennox
3. Lady Louisa Jane Russell
28. Cosmo Gordon, 3rd Duke of Gordon
14. Alexander Gordon, 4th Duke of Gordon
29. Lady Catherine Gordon
7. Lady Georgina Gordon
30. Sir William Maxwell, 3rd Baronet of Monreith, Wigtownshire
15. Jane Maxwell
31. Magdalen Blair

== See also ==
History of the associated clubs of the Apprentice Boys of Derry

Parliament of the United Kingdom
Preceded by William McCormick	Member of Parliament for Londonderry City; 1865–1868	Succeeded by Richard Dowse
Preceded by Lord Stanley; Hon. Robert Bourke	Member of Parliament for King's Lynn; 1869–1880; With: Hon. Robert Bourke	Succeeded by Sir William ffolkes, 3rd Baronet; Hon. Robert Bourke
Preceded by Viscount Sandon; Edward Whitley; Lord Ramsay	Member of Parliament for Liverpool; 1880–1885; With: Viscount Sandon 1880–1882; Edward Whitley 1880–1885; Samuel Smith 1882–1885	Constituency abolished
New constituency	Member of Parliament for Liverpool West Derby; 1885–1888	Succeeded by Hon. William Cross
Preceded by Earl Percy	Member of Parliament for Kensington South; Jan 1910 – 1918	Succeeded by William Davison
Party political offices
Preceded by Lord Randolph Churchill and Sir Michael Hicks Beach, Bt	Chairman of the National Union of Conservative and Constitutional Associations; 1885	Succeeded by Ellis Ashmead-Bartlett
