= Lord Ernest Hamilton =

British Army officer and politician (1858–1939)

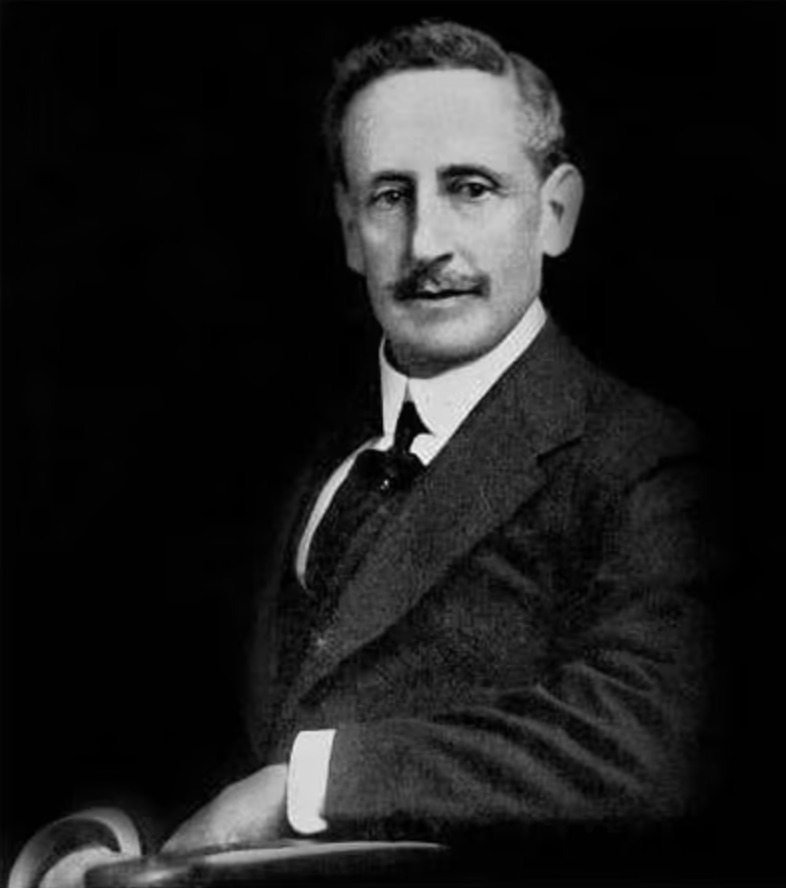
- Lord Ernest Hamilton by Elliott & Fry

Member of Parliament for Tyrone North
- In office 1885–1892

Personal details
- Born: 5 September 1858 Tunbridge Wells, Kent
- Died: 14 December 1939 (aged 81) Belgravia, London
- Party: Conservative
- Other political affiliations: British Fascists (until 1926)
- Spouse: Pamela Campbell (m. 1891; died 1931)
- Children: 4
- Parents: James Hamilton (father); Louisa Russell (mother)
- Relatives: Louisa Hamilton (sister); James Hamilton (brother); George Hamilton (brother); Albertha Hamilton (sister); Maud Hamilton (sister); Frederick Hamilton (brother); Claud Hamilton (brother)
- Military career
- Allegiance: United Kingdom
- Branch: British Army
- Rank: Captain
- Unit: 11th Hussars

Lord Ernest William Hamilton (5 September 1858 – 14 December 1939) was a British aristocrat, soldier, author, and Conservative politician who sat in the House of Commons from 1885 to 1892.

== Early life and family ==
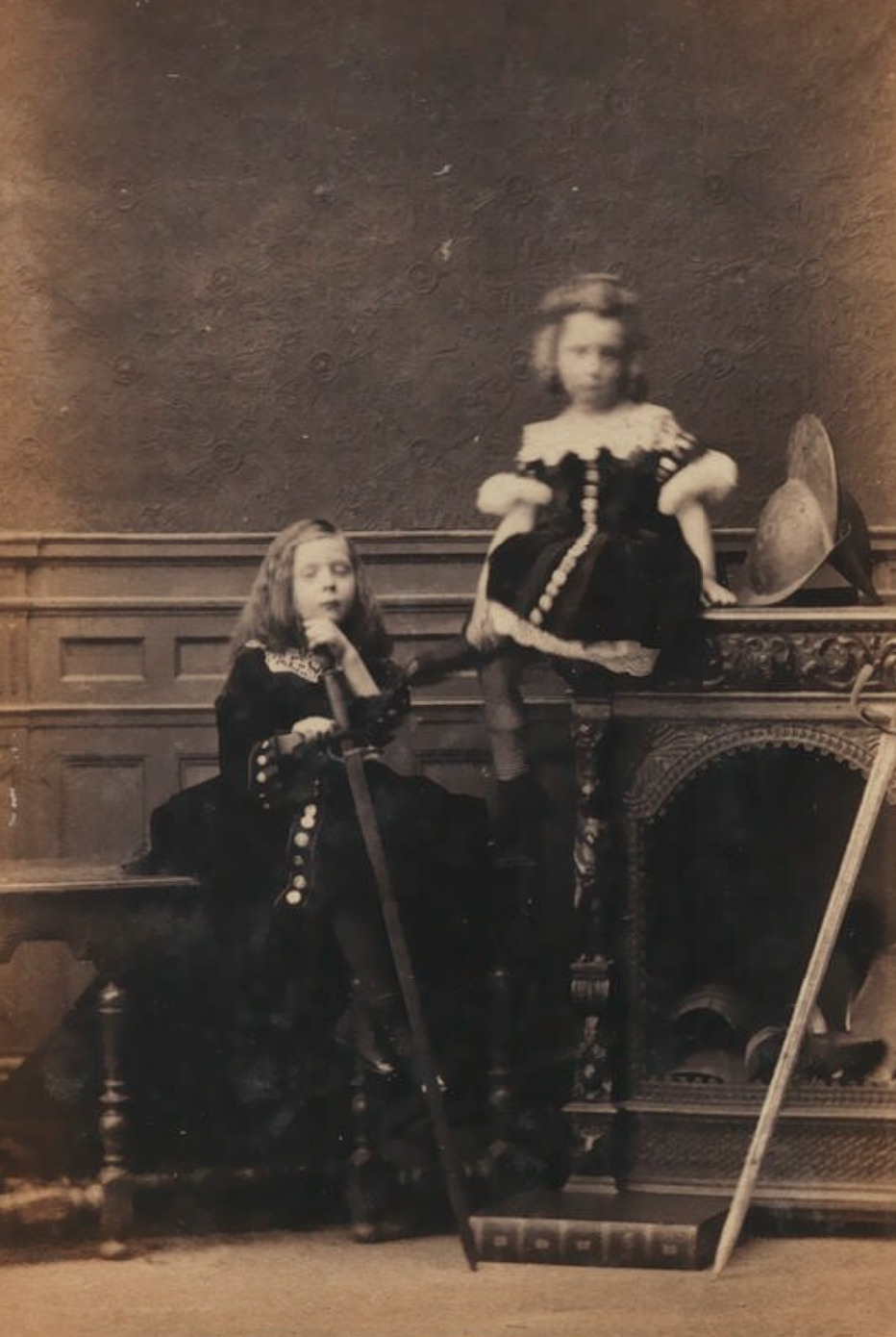
Lord Frederick Hamilton and Lord Ernest Hamilton, the two youngest sons of the Duke of Abercorn, in 1862, by Camille Silvy

Hamilton was born at Chancellor House, Tunbridge Wells, the seventh son of James Hamilton, 1st Duke of Abercorn, and his wife, Lady Louisa Jane Russell. He was educated at Harrow School and Royal Military College, Sandhurst. He became a captain in the 11th Hussars.

His elder brothers James, Marquess of Hamilton; Lord George Hamilton, Lord Claud Hamilton, and Lord Frederick Hamilton were also Conservative MPs. All seven of his sisters married into the peerage, including Louisa, Duchess of Buccleuch; Albertha, Duchess of Marlborough; and Maud Petty-Fitzmaurice, Marchioness of Lansdowne.

== Career ==
In the 1885 general election, Lord Ernest was elected Member of Parliament for Tyrone North. He held the seat until 1892.

Lord Ernest was the author of several novels, two of which, The Outlaws of the Marches and The Mawkin of the Flow, are set on the Scottish Borders in the late sixteenth and early seventeenth centuries. Another novel, Mary Hamilton, is based on the ballad of the same name.

In the period after the First World War, Hamilton published several historical works, notably The Soul of Ulster, arguing that Ulster Protestants are descended from Scottish Border Reivers transplanted to Ulster by James I and VI, and equating the 1641 massacre of planters by Irish Catholic rebels with later Irish nationalist movements.

In the 1920s, Lord Ernest supported the British Fascists led by Rotha Lintorn-Orman, but he resigned from the movement when Lintorn-Orman refused to co-operate with the Conservative government in resisting the 1926 general strike.

Lord Ernest was brought up as an Evangelical Anglican. His religious views are expressed in Involution, a book which denounces the theological concept of sacrificial atonement and argues that Jesus was a purely ethical teacher. Hamilton argues that Marcionism was the correct interpretation of Jesus' message and that the God of the Old Testament is a personification of the Jewish national character, which he describes in highly anti-semitic terms.

== Personal life ==
Lord Ernest married Pamela Campbell (d. 1931) in 1891. She was a granddaughter of Sir Guy Campbell, 1st Baronet by his son Capt. Frederick Augustus Campbell (1839–1916), Royal Equerry to Princess Louise, Duchess of Argyll. They had two sons and two daughters:

- Guy Ernest Frederick Hamilton (1894–1914), who died by suicide, unmarried, early in the First World War. He had lost his commission in the Naval Brigade, which according to his father, was because "his intense anxiousness to be at the front brought on nervous trouble." He shot himself in the chest days before he was to go to the Sandhurst.
- Mary Brenda Hamilton (1897–1985), who in 1922 married the Lt.-Col. of the Scots Guards, Alphonse de Chimay, Prince de Chimay, Comte de Caraman (d. 1973). Their only child, Pamela Therese Louise de Riquet married the 8th Marquess of Hertford.
- Jean Barbara Hamilton (b. 1898), who in 1921 became the first wife of Sir John Buchanan-Jardine, 3rd Baronet (1900–1969). They were divorced in 1944 and had one son.
- John George Peter Hamilton (1900–1967), who in 1932 married Alexandra Christine Egerton (d. 1963), daughter of William Egerton from Kimberley, South Africa. They had no issue.

His wife died in 1931.

He was the last surviving of the Duke of Abercorn's sons when he died in 1939 at Chesham Place, 89 years after Lord Cosmo Hamilton, who was the first of the Duke of Abercorn's children to die.

== Ancestry ==
Ancestors of Lord Ernest Hamilton

16. Captain The Hon. John Hamilton
8. John Hamilton, 1st Marquess of Abercorn
17. Harriet Craggs
4. James Hamilton, Viscount Hamilton
18. Sir Joseph Copley, 1st Baronet
9. Catherine Copley
19. Mary Buller
2. James Hamilton, 1st Duke of Abercorn
20. James Douglas, 14th Earl of Morton
10. The Hon. John Douglas
21. Bridget Heathcote
5. Harriet Douglas
22. Edward Lascelles, 1st Earl of Harewood
11. Lady Frances Lascelles
23. Anne Chaloner
1. Lord Ernest Hamilton
24. John Russell, 4th Duke of Bedford
12. Francis Russell, Marquess of Tavistock
25. The Hon. Gertrude Leveson-Gower
6. John Russell, 6th Duke of Bedford
26. Willem van Keppel, 2nd Earl of Albemarle
13. Lady Elizabeth Keppel
27. Lady Anne Lennox
3. Lady Louisa Jane Russell
28. Cosmo Gordon, 3rd Duke of Gordon
14. Alexander Gordon, 4th Duke of Gordon
29. Lady Catherine Gordon
7. Lady Georgina Gordon
30. Sir William Maxwell, 3rd Baronet of Monreith, Wigtownshire
15. Jane Maxwell
31. Magdalen Blair

Parliament of the United Kingdom
New constituency	Member of Parliament for Tyrone North; 1885–1892	Succeeded by Lord Frederick Spencer Hamilton
