= Lord Frederic Hamilton =

British politician

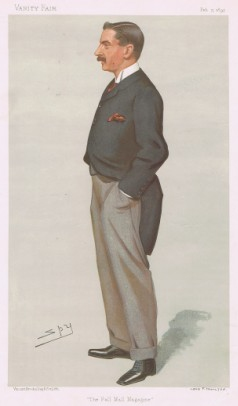
- "The Pall Mall Magazine"; Hamilton as caricatured by Spy (Leslie Ward) in Vanity Fair, February 1895

Member of Parliament for North Tyrone
- In office 1892-1895

Member of Parliament for Manchester South West
- In office 1885-1886

Personal details
- Born: 13 October 1856 Brighton, Sussex
- Died: 11 August 1928 (aged 71) Westminster, London
- Party: Conservative
- Parents: James Hamilton (father); Louisa Russell (mother)

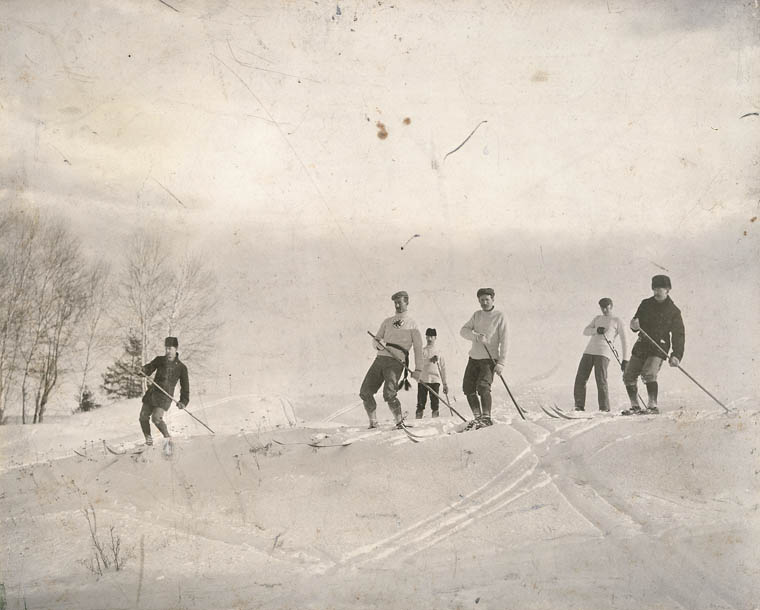
Skiers in Ottawa, 1895. Lord Frederic Hamilton introduced the sport of skiing to Canada in 1887.

Lord Frederic Spencer Hamilton (13 October 1856 – 11 August 1928) was a British aristocrat, Conservative politician, diplomat, and author.

== Biography ==
Lord Frederic was born in Brighton, the sixth son and thirteenth child of James Hamilton, Marquess of Abercorn and Louisa, Marchioness of Abercorn, who were "long remembered as the most handsome and most distinguished young couple of their generation." His father was created the 1st Duke of Abercorn in 1868. His mother, the daughter of the 6th Duke of Bedford, was the half-sister to Prime Minister John Russell.

He was Second Secretary of the Diplomatic Service (1877–1884) and Member of Parliament (MP) for Manchester South West (1885–1886) and North Tyrone (1892–1895). Lord Frederic also wrote the three-volume set of books, The Days Before Yesterday, Vanished Pomps of Yesterday and Here, There and Everywhere, which were first published in 1920 by Hodder and Stoughton, and known collectively as My Yesterdays. These give vivid, sometimes amusing and always well-written accounts of his early life, diplomatic service, and travels.

While serving as aide-de-camp to Lord Lansdowne, then Governor-General of Canada, in Ottawa, In January 1887, Lord Frederic was the first person to introduce skiing to Canada, using skis he had brought from Russia. As he recounts, he used to "slide down the toboggan slides at Ottawa on them, to universal derision". He was told they were "unsuited to Canadian conditions, and would never be popular in Canada".

From 1896 to 1900 he was editor of the Pall Mall Magazine.

Although his name was spelled "Frederick" on his birth certificate and in parliamentary records, he always spelled his name "Frederic" in his books and correspondence.

He never married and died without children, aged 71, at 13 Great College Street, Westminster.

== Ancestry ==
Ancestors of Lord Frederic Hamilton

16. Captain The Hon. John Hamilton
8. John Hamilton, 1st Marquess of Abercorn
17. Harriet Craggs
4. James Hamilton, Viscount Hamilton
18. Sir Joseph Copley, 1st Baronet
9. Catherine Copley
19. Mary Buller
2. James Hamilton, 1st Duke of Abercorn
20. James Douglas, 14th Earl of Morton
10. The Hon. John Douglas
21. Bridget Heathcote
5. Harriet Douglas
22. Edward Lascelles, 1st Earl of Harewood
11. Lady Frances Lascelles
23. Anne Chaloner
1. Lord Frederic Spencer Hamilton
24. John Russell, 4th Duke of Bedford
12. Francis Russell, Marquess of Tavistock
25. The Hon. Gertrude Leveson-Gower
6. John Russell, 6th Duke of Bedford
26. Willem van Keppel, 2nd Earl of Albemarle
13. Lady Elizabeth Keppel
27. Lady Anne Lennox
3. Lady Louisa Jane Russell
28. Cosmo Gordon, 3rd Duke of Gordon
14. Alexander Gordon, 4th Duke of Gordon
29. Lady Catherine Gordon
7. Lady Georgina Gordon
30. Sir William Maxwell, 3rd Baronet of Monreith, Wigtownshire
15. Jane Maxwell
31. Magdalen Blair

== Works ==
- The Vanished Pomps of Yesterday at Project Gutenberg, by Lord Frederic Hamilton, 1919 *
- The Days Before Yesterday at Project Gutenberg, by Lord Frederic Hamilton, 1920
- Here, There and Everywhere at Project Gutenberg, by Lord Frederic Hamilton, 1921

Parliament of the United Kingdom
New constituency	Member of Parliament for Manchester South West; 1885–1886	Succeeded by Jacob Bright
Preceded by Lord Ernest William Hamilton	Member of Parliament for North Tyrone; 1892–1895	Succeeded by Charles Hare Hemphill
