= Lord Wriothesley Russell =

English religious figure and peer

Canon of Windsor
- In office 1840-1886

Personal details
- Born: 11 May 1804 St James's, London
- Died: 6 April 1886 (aged 81) Chenies, Buckinghamshire
- Spouse: Elizabeth Russell
- Children: 3
- Parents: John Russell (father); Georgiana Gordon (mother)
- Relatives: Edward Russell (brother); Charles Russell (brother); Louisa Russell (sister); Alexander Russell (brother); Francis Russell (half-brother); George Russell (half-brother); John Russell (half-brother)
- Education: Trinity College, Cambridge

Lord Wriothesley Russell MA (11 May 1804 – 6 April 1886) was an Anglican cleric and aristocrat from the Russell family who was Canon of Windsor from 1840 to 1886.

== Biography ==
Lord Wriothesley was born in 1804 in St James's, Westminster, the fourth son of John Russell, 6th Duke of Bedford, and first with his second wife, Lady Georgiana Gordon, daughter of Alexander Gordon, 4th Duke of Gordon.

He was educated at Trinity College, Cambridge and was awarded MA in 1829. He was chaplain to Prince Albert.

He was appointed:

- Rector of St Michael's Church, Chenies, Buckinghamshire, 1829
- Rector of Streatham, Surrey, 1830
- Canon of the Ninth Stall in St George's Chapel, Windsor Castle, 1840
- Deputy Clerk of the Closet to Queen Victoria, 1850

== Personal life ==
Lord Wriothesley married his first cousin, Elizabeth Laura Henrietta Russell (22 Jan 1803 – 5 May 1886). They had three children:

- Alfred John Russell (13 Aug 1833 – 11 Feb 1857)
- Algernon Wriothesley Russell (30 Aug 1835 – 19 Feb 1908)
- Evelyn Mary Eliza Russell (5 May 1837 – 5 Dec 1913)

Rev. Russell and his wife are buried in the churchyard of St Michael's, Chenies, together with other members of the Russell family.
