= Wriothesley Russell =

Wriothesley Russell may refer to:

- Wriothesley Russell, 2nd Duke of Bedford (1680–1711)
- Wriothesley Russell, 3rd Duke of Bedford (1708–1732)
- Reverend Lord Wriothesley Russell (1804–1886)
