= Georgiana Russell, Duchess of Bedford =

British aristocrat

Her Grace The Duchess of Bedford
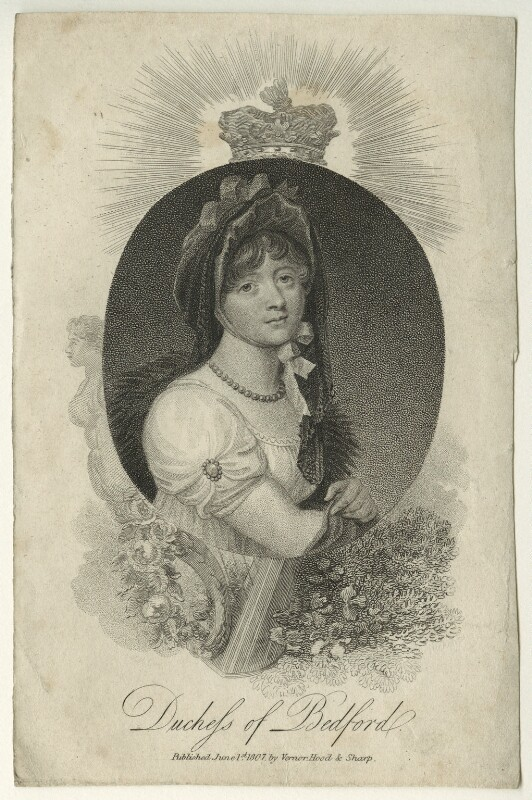
- Stipple engraving, 1806
- Born: 18 July 1781; Gordon Castle, Scotland
- Died: 24 February 1853 (aged 71)
- Spouse: John Russell, 6th Duke of Bedford (m. 1803)
- Children: Lord Wriothesley Russell; Lord Edward Russell; Lord Charles Russell; Lord Francis John Russell; Lady Georgiana Romilly; Louisa Hamilton, Duchess of Abercorn; Lord Francis John Russell; Lord Cosmo Russell; Lord Alexander Russell; Lady Rachel Butler
- Parent(s): Alexander Gordon, 4th Duke of Gordon; Jane Maxwell

Georgiana Russell, Duchess of Bedford (née Gordon; 18 July 1781 – 24 February 1853), formerly Lady Georgiana Gordon, was a British aristocrat, patron of the arts and wife of John Russell, 6th Duke of Bedford.

Georgiana was born at Gordon Castle in Scotland, a younger daughter of Alexander Gordon, 4th Duke of Gordon, and his first wife, Jane. In 1802, after the Treaty of Amiens, the Duchess of Gordon took Georgiana to Paris to pursue the option of a marriage with Eugène de Beauharnais, stepson of Napoleon, who was around her own age, but political sensitivities put an end to the plan. As a second option, the Duchess of Gordon then arranged for her to become engaged to Francis Russell, 5th Duke of Bedford; he died, aged 36, before they could marry. The duchess advised Georgiana to wear black when meeting Francis's younger brother, who had inherited the title and had been widowed with several children.

== Teenage years ==
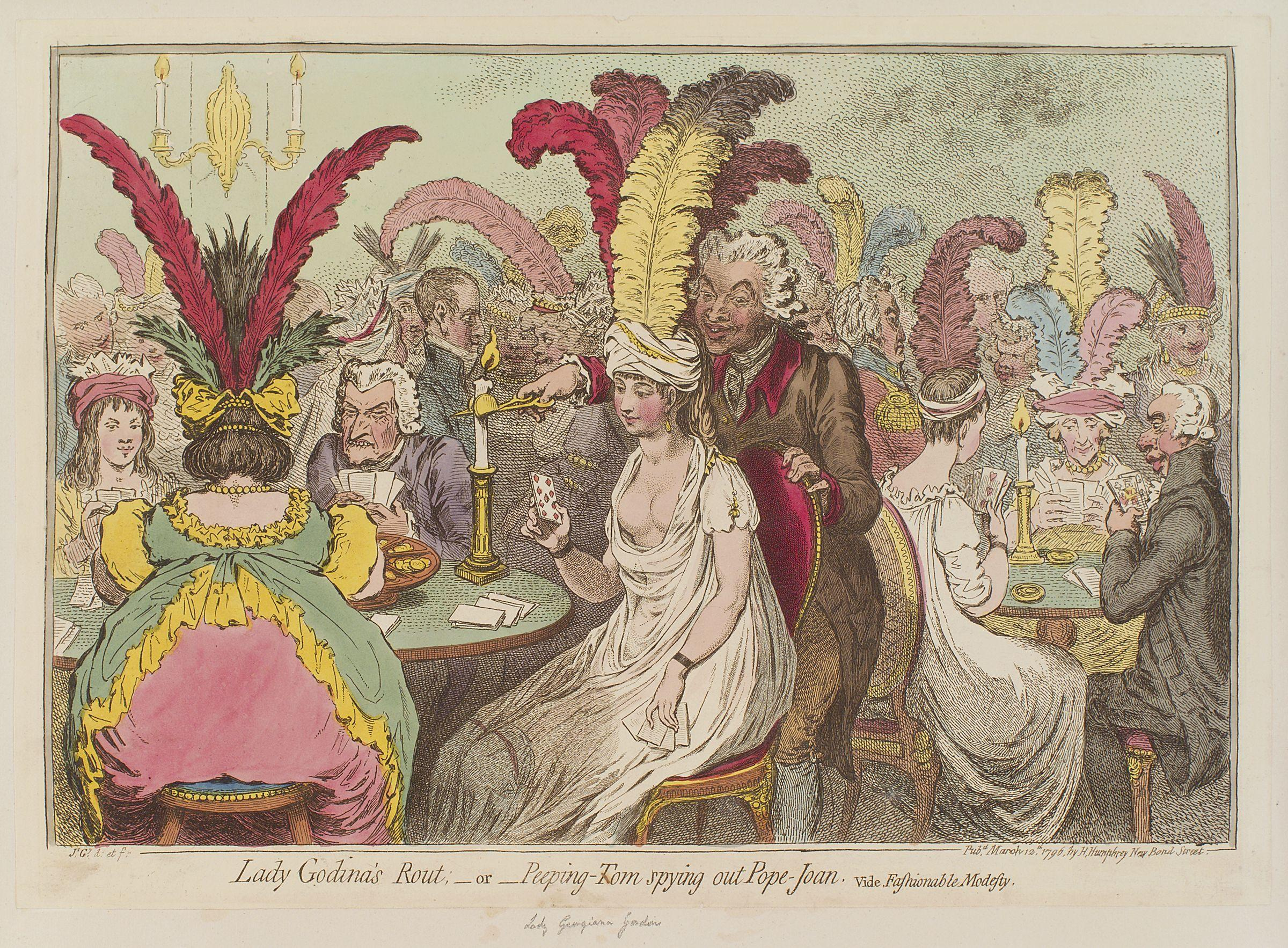
Lady Godina's rout; - or - Peeping-Tom spying out Pope-Joan, by James Gillray, 1796. She holds the ♦9, a powerful card in the game, the so-called Curse of Scotland.

Her mother was an inveterate party-giver, first in Edinburgh, then in London. James Gillray's caricature of 1796 shows Lady Georgiana Gordon, at the age of 14, at a rout-party, gambling at a game called "Pope Joan". Behind the card-tables is a tight crush of people. She is wearing an extreme décolletage, as was fashionable.

== Marriage ==
On 23 June 1803, Georgiana married, as his second wife, John Russell, 6th Duke of Bedford, already known as a politician under the title Lord John Russell. Georgiana's wedding dress was so elaborate that it became known as the "Georgiana Frock"; the couple honeymooned at Woburn Abbey. He was fifteen years her senior, and had previously been married for fifteen years to Georgiana Byng, daughter of George Byng, 4th Viscount Torrington, by whom he had three sons. She had died in 1801, prior to his inheriting the dukedom.

The Duchess of Gordon succeeded in finding titled husbands for all Georgiana's sisters, two of whom, Charlotte and Susan, also became duchesses. Jane Gordon died in 1812 and Georgiana's father married his long-standing mistress, Jean Christie.

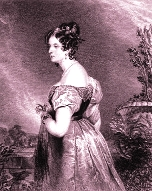
Georgiana, Duchess of Bedford

The Duke of Bedford and his second wife had seven sons and three daughters, including:

- Reverend Lord Wriothesley Russell (11 May 1804 – 6 April 1886), who married Elizabeth Henrietta Russell, his second cousin once removed, and had children
- Admiral Lord Edward Russell (24 April 1805 – 21 May 1887), who married Mary Ann Taylor and died childless
- Lieutenant-Colonel Lord Charles James Fox Russell (10 February 1807 – 29 June 1894), who married Isabella Davies and had children
- Lord Francis John Russell (born 1805), who joined the Navy.
- Lady Georgiana Elizabeth Russell (1810 – 22 March 1867), who married Charles Romilly and had children
- Lady Louisa Jane Russell (8 July 1812 – 31 March 1905), who married James Hamilton, 1st Duke of Abercorn, and had children
- Lord Henry Russell (born 1816), who joined the Navy.
- Lord Cosmo Russell (1817 – 1875), who married Anne Norbury
- General Lord Alexander Russell (16 September 1821 – 10 January 1907), who married Anne Holmes and had children
- Lady Rachel Evelyn Russell (1826 – 21 February 1898), who married Lord James Butler (son of James Butler, 1st Marquess of Ormonde) and had children

In 1806 the duchess accompanied her husband to Ireland, where he served for a year as Lord Lieutenant of Ireland. She also assisted the duke in implementing reforms on his estate, and it was said that she "had a strong natural sense of fairness and candour".

In 1823 the duchess met the artist Edwin Landseer, who had been commissioned to paint her portrait. He began giving her art lessons. The duke and duchess paid Landseer generously for the portrait. Soon she embarked on an affair with Landseer, of which the Duke seems to have been aware. An engraving of the portrait was published in The Keepsake annual for 1829, together with a poetical commentary by Letitia Elizabeth Landon, simply entitled Verses..

== Glen Feshie ==
In 1818, the Duke and Duchess of Bedford leased the Invereshie shootings in Badenoch from George Macpherson Grant of Ballindalloch, beginning a lifelong sporting association with Glen Feshie. In 1829, Georgiana began renting Doune House of Rothiemurchus as a retreat. In the 1830s she had a number of simple timber cottages constructed on the site of the former sheiling at Rugh Aiteachain in the upper glen, where she spent time fishing, sketching and gardening with her daughter Rachel. In the late 1840s, she had Alexander Mackintosh of Mackintosh convert the east side of Glen Feshie into a deer forest.

== As Dowager ==
Following the duke's death in 1839, the duchess moved to Endsleigh House in Devon, Woburn now being the property of her stepson Francis, the new duke. Endsleigh had been built by the duke, during their marriage, as a private family residence, with gardens designed by Humphry Repton. The Dowager Duchess also continued to live at Bedford Lodge on Campden Hill in Kensington and made it a famous centre for social gatherings. Duchess of Bedford's Walk in Kensington is named in her honour. Her finances were strained after her husband's death, who had left the new duke considerable debts, and she asked Lord Holland to allow her to graze a cow on Holland House land so that she could have fresh milk.

It has been suggested that Landseer proposed marriage to Georgiana in 1840, and that she rejected him, a disappointment from which he never recovered.

== Death ==
The duchess died in Nice, France on 23 February 1853, aged 71. Georgina chose to be buried in the cemetery of the English church in Nice rather than in the traditional Bedford burial place at Chenies.
