= Lord Alexander Russell =

British Army general (1821–1907)

General Lord Alexander Russell GCB
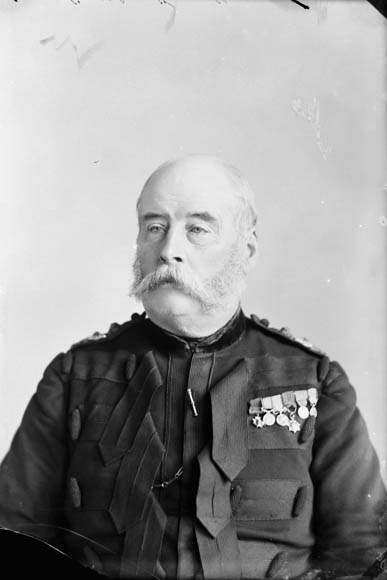
- Born: Alexander George Russell; 16 September 1821; Woburn, England
- Died: 10 January 1907 (aged 85); Woodeaton, England
- Spouse: Anne Emily Worsley Holmes (m. 1844; died 1906)
- Military career
- Branch: British Army
- Rank: General
- Unit: Rifle Brigade
- Conflicts: Crimean War

General Lord Alexander George Russell GCB (16 September 1821 – 10 January 1907) was a British Army general. He served during the Siege of Sevastapol in the Crimean War.

== Background ==
Russell was born at Woburn Abbey, Bedfordshire, the seventh son of John Russell, 6th Duke of Bedford and his second wife, Lady Georgina (or Georgiana) Gordon, daughter of Alexander Gordon, 4th Duke of Gordon, although it has been claimed that Russell's father was actually the Victorian painter Sir Edwin Landseer, who conducted a lengthy affair with the Duchess of Bedford. He was the half-brother of Francis Russell, 7th Duke of Bedford, Lord George Russell and Prime Minister John Russell, 1st Earl Russell and the full brother of Lord Edward Russell and Lord Charles Russell. He had three sisters, including Louisa Hamilton, Duchess of Abercorn.

== Military career ==
Russell joined the Army on 11 July 1839 when he purchased a commission as a Second Lieutenant in the Rifle Brigade. Russell was a Colonel in the Rifle Brigade and served during the Siege of Sevastapol in the Crimean War. He became General Officer Commanding South-Eastern District in April 1877 and Commander of the British Troops in Canada in May 1883 and was advanced to Knight Grand Cross of the Order of the Bath (GCB), having previously been a Companion of the Order of the Bath (CB). He was not however styled Sir Alexander Russell since he already held the higher title of Lord due to his father being first a Marquess and later a Duke.

== Life ==
Russell married Anne Emily Worsley Holmes, daughter of Sir Leonard Worsley Holmes, 9th Baronet, on 3 July 1844. They had two children:

- Alexander Gordon Russell (11 July 1854 – 4 June 1917); became a captain in the British Army.
- Leonard George Russell (6 June 1858 – 7 April 1946); became a major in the British Army.

Lady Alexander Russell died in October 1906. Russell survived her by only three months and died at Woodeaton, Oxfordshire, in January 1907, aged 85. She is buried with her husband in the churchyard of St Michael's, Chenies.

== Ancestry ==
Ancestors of Lord Alexander Russell

16. Wriothesley Russell, 2nd Duke of Bedford
8. John Russell, 4th Duke of Bedford
17. Elizabeth Howland
4. Francis Russell, Marquess of Tavistock
18. John Leveson-Gower, 1st Earl Gower
9. The Hon. Gertrude Leveson-Gower
19. Lady Evelyn Pierrepont
2. John Russell, 6th Duke of Bedford
20. Arnold van Keppel, 1st Earl of Albemarle
10. Willem van Keppel, 2nd Earl of Albemarle
21. Geertruid Johanna Quirina van der Duyn
5. Lady Elizabeth Keppel
22. Charles Lennox, 1st Duke of Richmond
11. Lady Anne Lennox
23. Anne Brudenell
1. Lord Alexander Russell
24. Alexander Gordon, 2nd Duke of Gordon
12. Cosmo Gordon, 3rd Duke of Gordon
25. Lady Henrietta Mordaunt
6. Alexander Gordon, 4th Duke of Gordon
26. William Gordon, 2nd Earl of Aberdeen
13. Lady Catherine Gordon
27. Lady Susan Murray
3. Lady Georgina Gordon
28. Sir Alexander Maxwell, 2nd Baronet of Monreith, Wigtownshire
14. Sir William Maxwell, 3rd Baronet of Monreith, Wigtownshire
29. Lady Jean Montgomerie
7. Jane Maxwell
30. William Blair
15. Magdalen Blair
31. Catharine Tait

Military offices
Preceded by William Parke	GOC South-Eastern District; 1877–1880	Succeeded by Edward Newdegate
Preceded by Sir Alexander Macdonnell	Colonel-Commandant of the 2nd Battalion, The Prince Consort's Own (Rifle Brigade); 1891–1892	Succeeded by Frederick Elrington
Preceded by Sir Patrick Leonard MacDougall	Lieutenant-General Commanding the Troops in Canada; 1883–1888	Succeeded by Sir John Ross
Preceded by John Longfield	Colonel of the 8th (The King's) Regiment of Foot; 1889–1891	Succeeded by George William Powlett Bingham
Preceded by Sir Arthur Johnstone Lawrence	Colonel-Commandant of the 1st Battalion, The Prince Consort's Own (Rifle Brigade); 1892–1907	Succeeded by Sir Arthur Frederick Warren
