= Badenoch =

Traditional district in Scotland

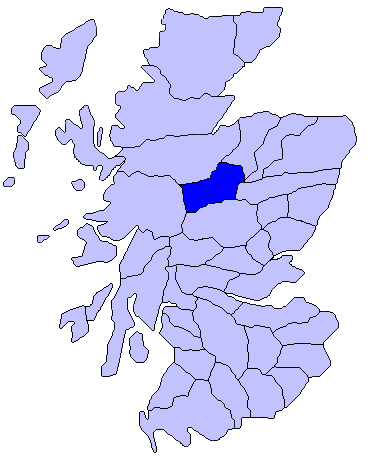
Map of Scotland showing the historic district of Badenoch

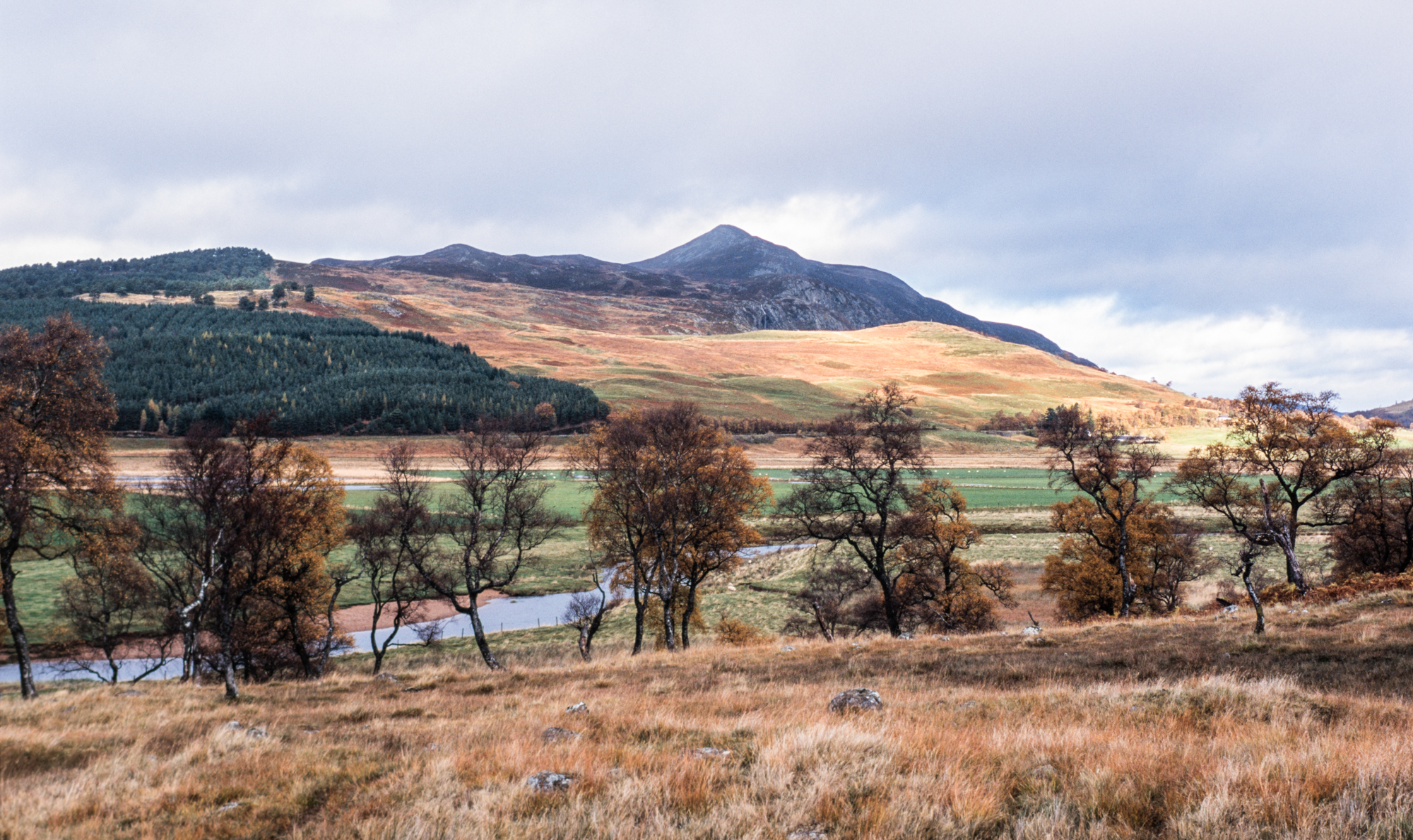
View of Creag Dhubh from across the Spey

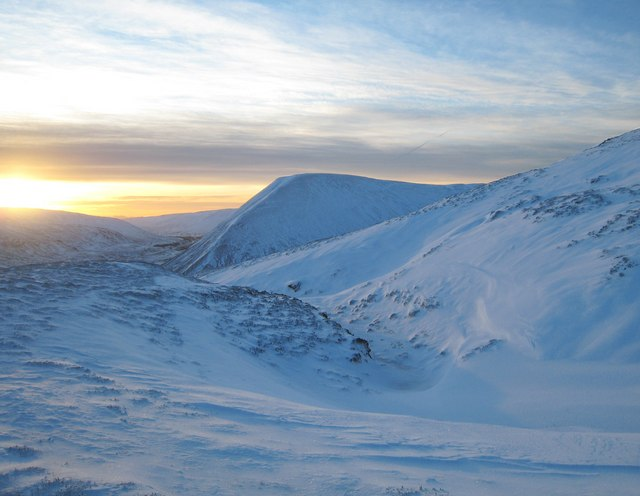
The Boar of Badenoch, a hill overlooking the Pass of Drumochter (which leads between Badenoch and Atholl)

Badenoch (/ˈbædənɒx/ BAD-ə-nokh; Scottish Gaelic: Bàideanach [ˈpaːtʲənəx]) is a district of the Scottish Highlands centred on the upper reaches of the River Spey, above Strathspey. The name Badenoch means the drowned land, with most of the population living close to the River Spey or its tributaries.

The area is bounded on the north by the Monadhliath Mountains, on the east by the Cairngorms and Braemar, on the south by Atholl and the Grampians, and on the west by Lochaber. The capital of Badenoch is Kingussie, although historically Ruthven was the market town, and later site of the British Army's Ruthven Barracks.

== Geography ==
The somewhat undefined area of Badenoch covers 36 miles (58 km) from northeast to southwest and 15 miles (24 km) from north to south, comprising 540 square miles (1,400 km^{2}). Excepting the strath of the Spey and the great glens, it consists almost entirely of wild mountainous country, many mountains exceeding 3,000 feet or 914.4 metres in height (i.e., Munros), and contains in the deer forests of Alder, Drumochter, Gaick and Feshie, some of the best deer country in the Highlands.

The principal lochs in Badenoch are Loch Laggan, Loch Insh and Loch Ericht. The River Spey and its numerous tributaries water the district abundantly. South of Loch Insh, the Spey extends into the Insh Marshes.

The Highland railway traverses Badenoch from Dalnaspidal to Boat of Garten.

In modern times Badenoch comprises the parishes of Alvie, Kingussie and Insh, and Laggan. The former Lordship of Badenoch also included a detached portion in the east, the parish of Kincardine, now part of Abernethy and Kincardine parish. As regards the parish of Duthil and Rothiemurchus, the barony of Glencarnie in Duthil (from Aviemore to Garten) was attached for a time. Rothiemurchus, which lies between Badenoch and its former detached portion, was never a part of Badenoch.

Badenoch is within the Cairngorms National Park, and is part of the Badenoch and Strathspey ward of Highland Council.

== Population ==
The population of Badenoch at the 2011 census was as follows:

Parish	Population
Alvie	564
Kingussie and Insh	3100
Laggan	266
TOTAL	3930

The Picts inhabited Badenoch, as shown by the placenames, which include Pictish prefixes such as pet- (Pitowrie, Pitchurn, Pitmean) and aber- (Aberarder). However their language was superseded by Gaelic by the 11th century at the latest, and even as late as 1881, 74% of Badenoch was Gaelic-speaking (2,685 out of the population of 3,611).

== History ==
From 1229 to 1313 Clan Comyn held the lordship of Badenoch.

Badenoch is also the traditional homeland of the Clan Chattan Confederation, particularly Clan MacPherson, whose traditions state that in 1309 Robert the Bruce offered the lands of Badenoch to them if they destroyed the Bruce's enemies, the Clan Comyn.

In 1371 King Robert II granted Badenoch to his son Alexander Stewart, 1st Earl of Buchan (1343–1405), who became known as the "Wolf of Badenoch". Reverting to the crown, the territory came in 1452 to Alexander Gordon, 1st Earl of Huntly, and still gives the title of "Lord of Badenoch" to the Marquess of Huntly. However, in 1829, insupportable debts obliged George Gordon, 5th Duke of Gordon to advertise his remaining estates in Badenoch for sale, and by 1834 all of the Gordon lands had been sold.

Historically, the area was subsistence farmed. In the summer, cattle were grazed on high pastures, with people living in shieling huts at up to 2,500 feet (760 m) above sea level. An estimated 4500–5000 cattle were in Badenoch in the 1770s.

In the mid-1750s, the first flood banks on the River Spey in Badenoch were built at Pitmain, just southwest of the modern day edge of Kingussie.

High timber prices during the Napoleonic Wars led to substantial tree felling in Glenmore, Rothiemurchus, Inshriach and Glen Feshie, with many of the logs being floated down the Spey to the coast.

Famine struck Badenoch in the early 1770s and 1780s, the later was widespread across Scotland and even Europe. This particularly impacted the peasants of the area and increased the polarisation between rich and poor. Farming tenants suffered hardship again in the years 1836-39 when severe weather resulted in crop failures and substantial losses of livestock. While Badenoch was hit hard by the potato famine of 1847, it escaped the utter devastation experienced in other parts of the Highlands.

The 1830s and 1840s saw the creation of deer forests to meet the demand from southern aristocrats and industrialists for Highland sporting estates. The requirement that deer forests be free of sheep and cattle brought the hill farming economy of these areas to an end, resulting in more people leaving the land. George Macpherson Grant of Ballindalloch converted the forest of Gaik into a deer forest for Sir Joseph Radcliffe after purchasing it in 1830. In 1836, Ewen Macpherson of Cluny converted his lands of Benalder and Gallovie (Ardverikie) into one large deer forest for James Hamilton, Marquis of Abercorn. Macpherson Grant converted his sheep range in the Forest of Feshie into a deer forest in 1839. Georgiana Gordon, Duchess of Bedford had Alexander Mackintosh of Mackintosh convert the east side of Glen Feshie into a deer forest in the late 1840s. Rothiemurchus became a deer forest in 1859.

A significant proportion of the population was dependent on seasonal employment outwith the Highlands, but depopulation as a result of large-scale emigration occurred later in Badenoch than in other areas. Poor market prices, harvest failures, farm amalgamations, rent rises and the creation of sheep walks and deer forests led to a steady exedus of people from the 1830s onwards, mainly to Canada and Australia.

== Economy ==
The area has very few industries, and the population is mainly located in Kingussie and in other settlements on or near the Spey.

== Bibliography ==
- Barrow, G.W.S. (1988). "Badenoch and Strathspey, 1130-1312. 1: Secular and political". Northern Scotland. 8 (1): 1–15. doi:10.3366/nor.1988.0002.
- MacBain, Alexander (1890). "Badenoch: Its History, Clans and Place Names". Transactions of the Gaelic Society of Inverness.
- Ross, Alasdair (2015). Land Assessment and Lordship in Medieval Northern Scotland. Turnhout: Brepols. ISBN 978-2503541334.
- Taylor, David (2016). The wild black region: Badenoch 1750-1800. Edinburgh: John Donald, an imprint of Birlinn Ltd. ISBN 978-1-906566-98-2.
- Taylor, David (2022), The People Are Not There: The Transformation of Badenoch 1800 - 1863, John Donald, Edinburgh, ISBN 9781910900987
- Mackenzie, Mary, & Taylor, David (2024), Glen Banchor: A Highland Glen and its People, Badenoch Heritage, ISBN 9781913529154
