= Louisa Hamilton, Duchess of Abercorn =

English aristocrat (1812–1905)

Her Grace The Duchess of Abercorn VA
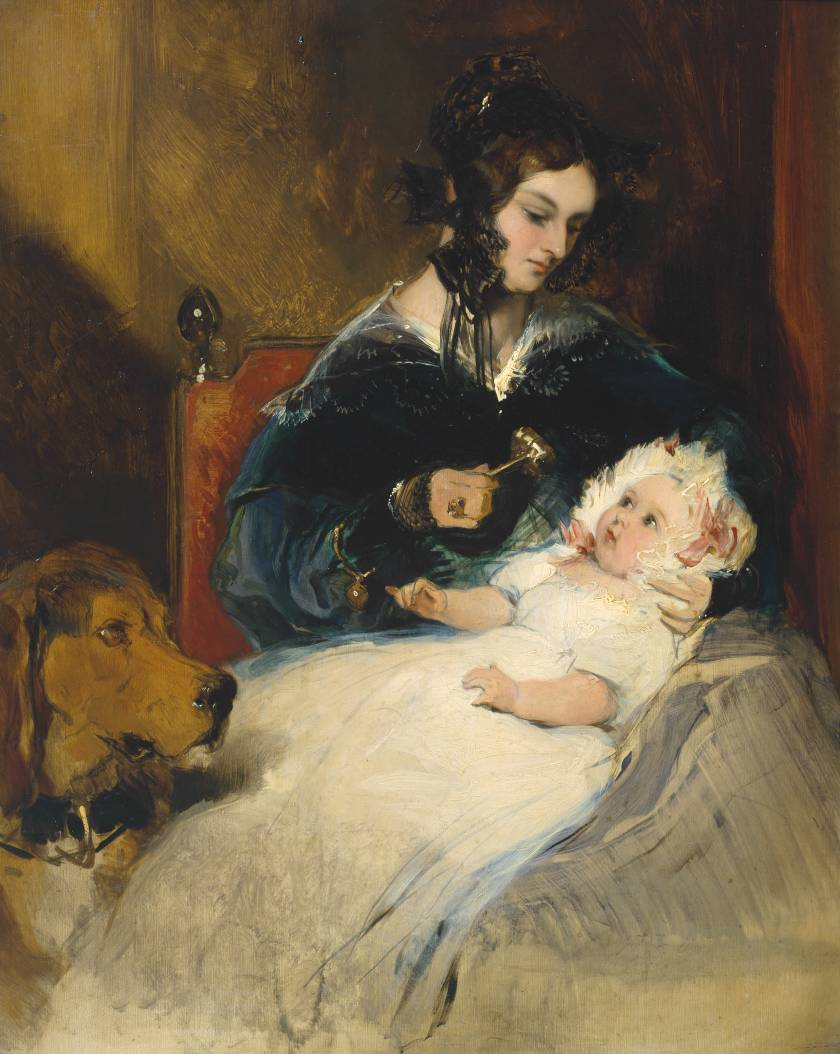
- Painting of Louisa Hamilton, by Edwin Henry Landseer
- Born: Lady Louisa Jane Russell; 8 July 1812; London, England
- Died: 31 March 1905 (aged 92); Coates Castle, Coates, West Sussex, England
- Burial place: Chenies, Buckinghamshire
- Spouse: James Hamilton, 1st Duke of Abercorn (m. 1832; died 1885)
- Children: Harriett Anson, Countess of Lichfield; Beatrix Lambton, Countess of Durham; Louisa Montagu Douglas Scott, Duchess of Buccleuch; Katherine Edgcumbe, Countess of Mount Edgcumbe; James Hamilton, 2nd Duke of Abercorn; Georgiana Turnour, Countess Winterton; Lord Claud Hamilton; Lord George Hamilton; Albertha Spencer-Churchill, Duchess of Marlborough; Lord Ronald Hamilton; Maud Petty-Fitzmaurice, Marchioness of Lansdowne; Lord Cosmo Hamilton; Lord Frederick Spencer Hamilton; Lord Ernest Hamilton
- Parents: John Russell, 6th Duke of Bedford; Lady Georgina Gordon

Louisa Jane Hamilton, Duchess of Abercorn VA (née Russell; 8 July 1812 – 31 March 1905) was a member of the British aristocracy. She and her husband, James Hamilton, 1st Duke of Abercorn, had 13 children, and were "long remembered as the most handsome and most distinguished young couple of their generation."

== Early life, marriage, and family ==
Lady Louisa Jane Russell was born on Wednesday, 8 July 1812, at 2 Hamilton Place, Mayfair, She was the sixth child of eight, and a second daughter for John Russell, 6th Duke of Bedford and Lady Georgiana Gordon. She was the sister of Rev. Lord Wriothesley Russell, Gen. Lord Alexander Russell, Admiral Lord Edward Russell, and Lord Charles Russell and half-sister of Francis Russell, 7th Duke of Bedford, Prime Minister John Russell, 1st Earl Russell, and Lord George Russell. She made her debut in society aged 12 and met her future husband at a children's ball.

On Thursday, 25 October 1832, at Gordon Castle, in Morayshire, Scotland, Louisa married James Hamilton, 2nd Marquess of Abercorn, the son of James Hamilton, Viscount Hamilton, and Harriet Douglas.

Louisa and James had fourteen children, and she was known for her skills as a matchmaker for her children, with her choices based primarily on rank. Among her issue were seven daughters, all of whom were ordered to marry into the peerage and no one beneath the rank of an earl. Their children were:

- Lady Harriett Georgiana Louisa Hamilton (6 July 1834 – 23 April 1913), married 10 April 1855 Thomas Anson, 2nd Earl of Lichfield, and had issue
- Lady Beatrix Frances Hamilton (21 July 1835 – 21 January 1871), married in London 23 May 1854 George Lambton, 2nd Earl of Durham, and had issue
- Lady Louisa Jane Hamilton (26 August 1836 – 16 March 1912), married in London 22 November 1859 William Montagu Douglas Scott, 6th Duke of Buccleuch, and had issue
- James Hamilton, 2nd Duke of Abercorn (24 August 1838 – 3 January 1913), married Lady Mary Anna Curzon-Howe, daughter of Richard Curzon-Howe, 1st Earl Howe, and his second wife, Anne Gore, and had issue
- Lady Katherine Elizabeth Hamilton (9 January 1840 – 3 September 1874), married 26 October 1858 William Edgcumbe, 4th Earl of Mount Edgcumbe, and had issue
- Lady Georgiana Susan Hamilton (7 July 1841 – 23 March 1913), married in London 16 March 1882 Edward Turnour, 5th Earl Winterton, and had issue
- Lord Claud John Hamilton (20 February 1843 – 26 January 1925), an aide-de-camp to Queen Victoria from 1887 to 1897. He married Carolina Chandos-Pole, and had issue
- Lord George Francis Hamilton (17 December 1845 – 22 September 1927), married Lady Maud Lascelles, and had issue
- Lady Albertha Frances Anne Hamilton (29 July 1847 – 7 January 1932), married at the Palace of Westminster, London, 8 November 1869 George Spencer-Churchill, 8th Duke of Marlborough, and had issue, divorced 20 November 1883
- Lord Ronald Douglas Hamilton (17 March 1849 – 6 November 1867)
- Lady Maud Evelyn Hamilton (17 December 1850 – 21 October 1932), married at Westminster Abbey, London, 8 November 1869 Henry Petty-Fitzmaurice, 5th Marquess of Lansdowne, and had issue
- Lord Cosmo Hamilton (16 April 1853 – 16 April 1853)
- Lord Frederick Spencer Hamilton (13 October 1856 – 11 August 1928), never married
- Lord Ernest William Hamilton (5 September 1858 – 14 December 1939), married Pamela Campbell, and had issue

In 1881, Louisa was invested as a Lady of the Royal Order of Victoria and Albert (3rd class).

She was still living at the time of the birth of her great-great-grandson, the future Prime Minister Alec Douglas-Home, on 2 July 1903. Her other great-great-grandchildren that she lived to see were Lady Patricia Herbert, Mildred Egerton, daughter of Lady Bertha Anson, Louisa's great-granddaughter through her grandson Thomas Anson, 3rd Earl of Lichfield and Guendolen Wilkinson, daughter of Lady Beatrix Herbert, Louisa's great-granddaughter through her granddaughter Lady Beatrix Lambton.

== Death ==
The Duchess of Abercorn died at Coates Castle, Coates, West Sussex, England on 31 March 1905, aged 92. She survived her husband by almost twenty years.

She was interred on 5 April 1905, in Chenies, Buckinghamshire; she left an estate worth over £24,000 (equivalent to £2,523,000 in 2025).
