= John Rundle =

British politician

John Rundle

John Rundle (1791 – January 1864) was a British Whig politician and businessman.

From 1835 to 1843, he was a member of parliament, representing Tavistock in the House of Commons. He was one of the original directors and financiers of the South Australia Company, the company that was formed in London in 1834 to promote the settlement of the colony that was to become South Australia. He was an original director of the South Australian Banking Company and the first chairman of the South Australian School Society whilst living in England. Rundle never visited South Australia. His business interests included the Tavistock Bank, Gill and Rundle – Merchants and Carriers, Rundle and Co Gas Works, Gill and Rundle Foundry and a brewery. A canal linking Tavistock to the port at Plymouth was leased by his company and they had their own lime kilns, warehouses and wharves. In the 1840s his business affairs soured and he finally moved to London to live with his daughter where he died in poverty.

Rundle Mall and Rundle Street in the Adelaide central business district bear his name. John Rundle married Barbara Gill in 1825. They had one daughter who was the famed author Elizabeth Rundle Charles.

Parliament of the United Kingdom
| Preceded by Charles Richard Fox; Lord Edward Russell | Member of Parliament for Tavistock; 1835 – 1843; With: Lord Edward Russell; Edward Russell | Succeeded by John Salusbury Trelawny; Edward Russell |
