= Elizabeth Charles =

English writer (1828–1896)

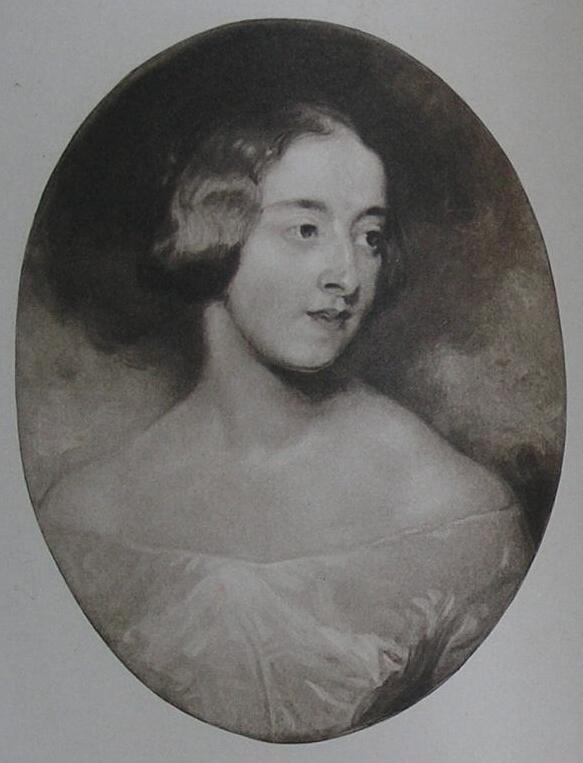
Elizabeth Rundle

Elizabeth Rundle Charles (2 January 1828 – 28 March 1896) was an English writer.

She was born at Tavistock, Devon, the daughter of John Rundle, MP. Some of her youthful poems won the praise of Tennyson, who read them in manuscript. In 1851 she married Andrew Paton Charles. She was affiliated with the Anglican Church, and died at Hampstead, London, in 1896.

== Author ==
Charles's best known book, written to order for an editor who wished for a story about Martin Luther, The Chronicles of the Schönberg-Cotta Family, was published in 1862, and was translated into most of the European languages, into Arabic, and into many Indian dialects. Mrs Charles wrote in all over fifty books, the majority of a semi-religious character, as well as writing and translating a number of hymns. She took an active part in the work of various charitable institutions, and among her friends and correspondents were Dean Stanley, Archbishop Tait, Charles Kingsley, William Booth, Benjamin Jowett and Edward Bouverie Pusey.

Her works include The Voice of Christian Life in Song; or, Hymns and Hymn-writers of Many Lands and Ages (1859), The Three Wakings, and Other Poems (1859), Wanderings over Bible Lands and Seas (1862), The Early Dawn (1864), Winifred Bertram and the World She Lived In (1866), Poems (1867), The Draytons and the Davenants (1867), Songs Old and New (1882), and Conquering and to Conquer/The Diary of Brother Bartholomew. Our Seven Homes (1896) is autobiographical. A number of her hymns appeared in The Family Treasury, edited by William Arnot (1808–1875).

== Books ==
- The Voice of Christian Life in Song; or, Hymns and Hymn-writers of Many Lands and Ages (1859)
- The Three Wakings, and Other Poems (1859)
- Wanderings over Bible Lands and Seas (1862)
- The Early Dawn (1864)
- Diary of Mrs. Kitty Trevylyan (1864)
- Chronicles of the Schonberg-Cotta Family (1865)
- The Martyrs of Spain and the Liberators of Holland (1865)
- Winifred Bertram and the World She Lived In (1866)
- Poems (1867)
- The Draytons and the Davenants (1867)
- On Both Sides of the Sea (1868)
- The Victory of the Vanquished (1870)
- Against the Stream: The Story of an Heroic Age in England (1873)
- Songs Old and New (1882)
- Conquering and to Conquer/The Diary of Brother Bartholomew
- Our Seven Homes (1896)
- The Beatitudes: Thoughts for All Saints' Day
- By the Mystery of Thy Holy Incarnation
- By Thy Cross and Passion
- By Thy Glorious Resurrection and Ascension
- By the Coming of the Holy Ghost: Thoughts for Whitsuntide
- The True Vine
- The Great Prayer of Christendom: Thoughts on the Lord's Prayer
- An Old Story of Bethlehem: One Link in the Great Pedigree
- Joan the Maid, Deliverer of England and France
- Ecce Ancilla Domini: Mary the Mother of our Lord, Studies in the Ideal of Womanhood
- Ecce Homo, Ecce Rex: Pages from the Story of the Moral Conquests of Christianity
- Three Martyrs of the Nineteenth Century: Studies from the Lives of Gordon, Livingstone, and Patteson
- Martyrs and Saints of the First Twelve Centuries: Studies from the Lives of the Black-letter Saints of the English Calendar
- Attila and his Conquerors: A Story of the Days of St. Patrick and St. Leo the Great
- Early Christian Missions of Ireland, Scotland, and England
- Lapsed, not Lost
- Within the Veil: Studies in the Epistle to the Hebrews
- The Book of the Unveiling: Studies in the Revelation of St. John the Divine
- Lady Augusta Stanley: Reminiscences
- Sketches of the Women of Christendom
- Thoughts and Characters: Being Selections from the Writings of Mrs. Charles

== Hymns ==
- Around a Table, Not a Tomb
- Come and Rejoice with Me
- Is Thy Cruse of Comfort Wasting?
- Jesus, What Once Thou Wast
- Never Further Than Thy Cross
- Praise Ye the Triune God
- What Marks the Dawning of the Year?

== Hymn translations ==
- Dost Thou in a Manger Lie?
- Lo, the Day, the Day of Life!
- The Morning Kindles All the Sky
- A Lamb Goes Uncomplaining Forth (Original: Paul Gerhardt, German)
