= John Longfield =

Irish army officer (1805–1889)

General John Longfield, CB (1805 – 27 February 1889) was an Irish senior officer in the British Army. He was married to Frances Patience Longfield.

His father was John Longfield of the Longfield family who owned Longueville house, near Mallow. In 1825 Longfield was appointed an ensign in the 8th (The King's) Regiment of Foot. He was promoted successively, to the ranks of lieutenant in 1828, captain in 1835, major in 1844, lieutenant-colonel in 1846 and brevet colonel in 1854. He was a brigadier general in Bengal from May to November 1855, April to December 1856 and June 1857 to April 1859.

Longfield was reported to have been in command of British Army's reserve force during its assault on Delhi in 1857. It was described as having consisted of 250 men of the 61st Battalion, 200 men of the Belosch Battalion, (Note: 127th Baluch Light Infantry?) 250 men of the 4th Punjab Infantry, and 200 men of the Jheend Force. This reserve was called up to strengthen the columns that had breached the city's defences in advance of pushing to the heart of the city. During the subsequent fighting over the course of six days, Longfield's 2nd Brigade was in the city of Delhi.

Longfield was made a major general in 1860. He was appointed colonel of the 29th Regiment of Foot on 19 April 1868 and one year later promoted to lieutenant-colonel. He was made a full general on 19 July 1876.

The 29th Foot was amalgamated with the 36th (Herefordshire) Regiment of Foot, creating the Worcestershire Regiment. Following this, Longfield continued as colonel of the new regiment's 1st Battalion until 1881. In that year he transferred back as colonel of his original regiment, the 8th King's. He held this position until his death.

On 27 February 1889 Longfield died at Kilcoleman, (Note: Kilcolman?) near Bandon.

== Notes ==
Military offices
Preceded by Thomas Gerrard Ball	Colonel of The King's (Liverpool) Regiment; 1881–1889	Succeeded by Alexander George Russell
Preceded by Sir James Simpson	Colonel of the 29th (Worcestershire) Regiment of Foot; 1868–1881	Succeeded by Amalgamated to form the Worcestershire Regiment
