= Rachel Butler =

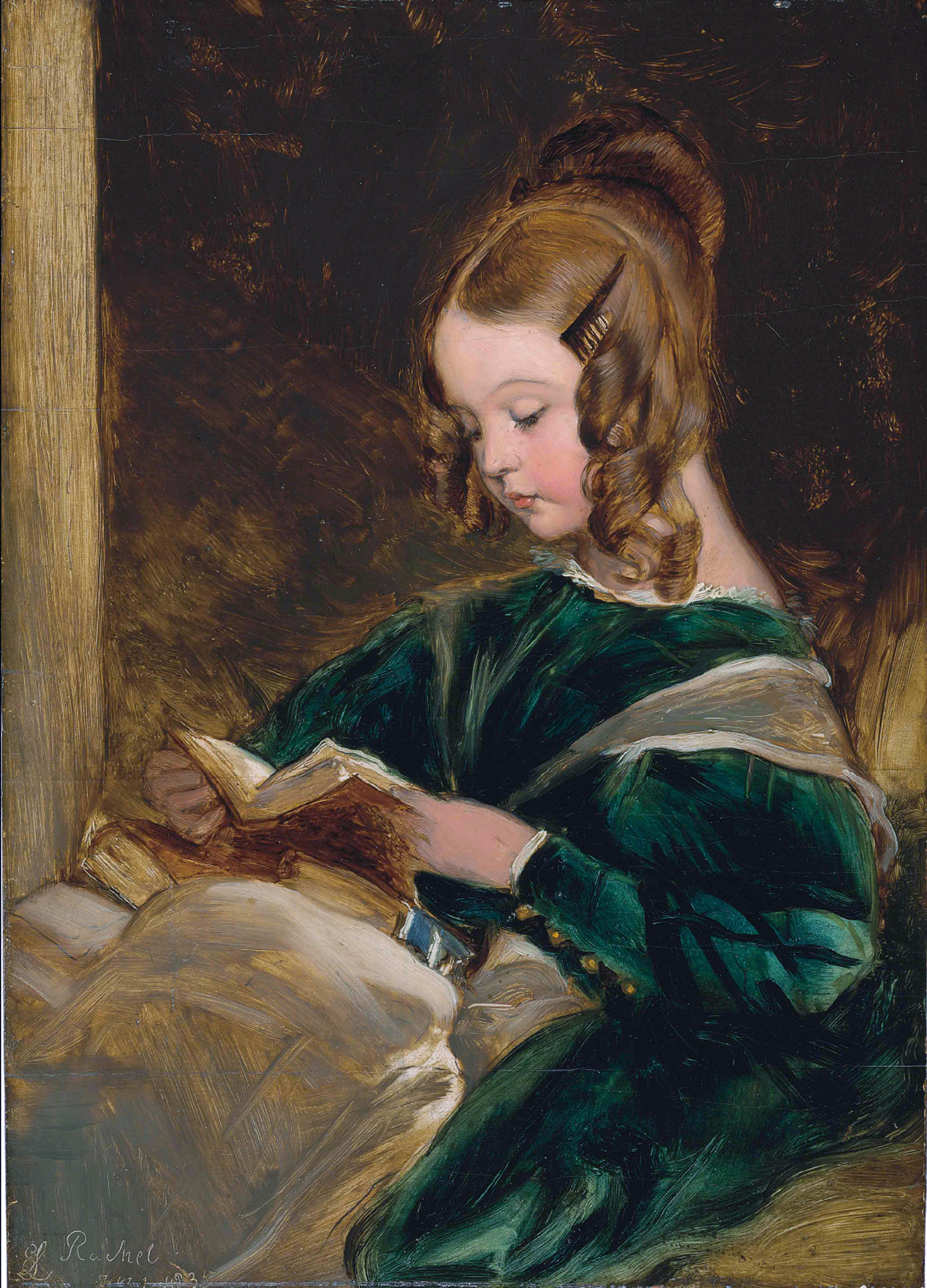
- portrait by Edwin Henry Landseer
- Born: 1826
- Died: 21 February 1898 (aged 71–72)
- Occupation: Novelist
- Spouse(s): James Wandesford Butler
- Children: 4
- Parent(s): John Russell, 6th Duke of Bedford; Georgiana Russell, Duchess of Bedford

Lady Rachel Evelyn Butler (1826 – 21 February 1898) was an English novelist.

She was born Rachel Evelyn Russell in 1826, the daughter of John Russell, 6th Duke of Bedford and Georgiana Russell, Duchess of Bedford. Her mother, a famed patron of the arts, had an affair with the painter Edwin Landseer, twenty one years her junior. Landseer was a frequent visitor to Woburn Abbey and painted portraits of the Russell family members, including Rachel. The affair led to the widespread belief, both among her contemporaries and biographers, that Rachel was actually the daughter of Landseer.

In 1856, Rachel Russell married Lord James Wandesford Butler, son of James Butler, 1st Marquess of Ormonde. He was briefly state steward to the Lord Lieutenant of Ireland and had a small estate in Drumcondra. They had four children.

Her novel The Prophecy (1862) is a work of historical fiction framed as a document discovered in 1822 about the history of the Butler family in the early 17th century. Of her Scottish Highlands novel Jessie Cameron (1857), George Eliot wrote that it contained "deep feeling, void of sentimentality".

Rachel Butler died on 21 February 1898.

== Bibliography ==
- Jessie Cameron: A Highland Story. 1 vol. Edinburgh: Blackwood, 1857.
- The Prophecy. 2 vol. London: Bentley, 1862.
