= Charles Romilly =

English cricketer

Charles Romilly (22 January 1808 – 26 August 1887) was an English barrister and cricketer with amateur status. He was associated with Marylebone Cricket Club (MCC) and made his debut in 1828.

He was the fifth son of the legal reformer Sir Samuel Romilly and Anne Garbett. His brothers were John Romilly, 1st Baron Romilly (1802–1874); and fellow cricketers Edward Romilly (1804–1870) and Lt.-Col. Frederick Romilly (1810–1887).

He married Lady Georgiana Russell, daughter of John Russell, 6th Duke of Bedford and Georgiana Russell, Duchess of Bedford. He died in 1887 at 29 Wilton Crescent in Belgravia.

== Bibliography ==
- Haygarth, Arthur (1996) [1862]. Scores & Biographies, Volume 1 (1744–1826). Kennington: Frederick Lillywhite. ISBN 978-19-00592-23-9.
- Haygarth, Arthur (1997) [1862]. Scores & Biographies, Volume 2 (1827–1840). Kennington: Frederick Lillywhite. ISBN 978-19-00592-23-9.
