= River Feshie =

Tributary of the River Spey, Scotland

Coordinates: 57°08′N 3°55′W

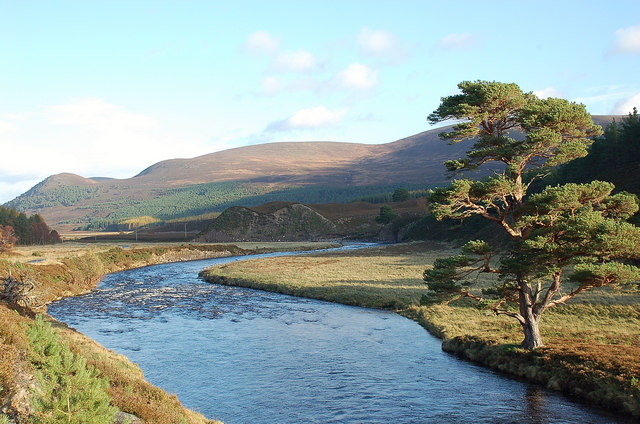
A Scots pine by the River Feshie

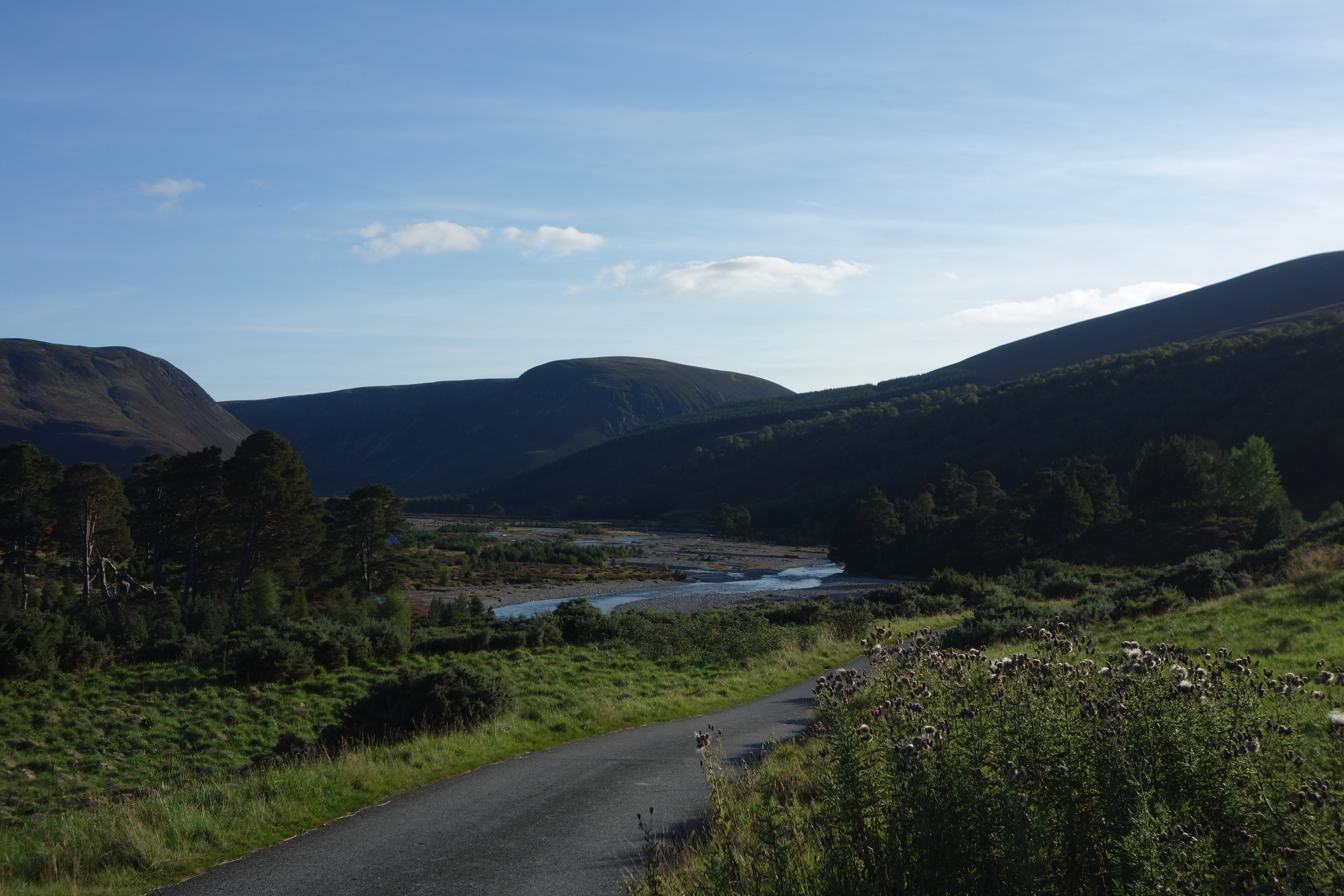
A view of Glen Feshie, with the River Feshie in the center

The River Feshie (Scottish Gaelic: Fèisidh / Abhainn Fhèisidh) is a major right bank tributary of the River Spey in north-east Scotland. It rises in the remote countryside of the Glenfeshie Forest, flowing initially eastwards before turning sharply to the northwest as a result of the capture of the waters of Geldie Burn. After gaining the waters of the River Eidart on its right bank and dropping down into Glen Feshie, it flows northwards through the wooded glen and is often braided in nature. It is joined by several burns which descend steeply from the Cairngorm plateau to the east and, on its left bank, by the Allt Chomhraig near Balachroick. The river passes beneath the B970 road at Feshiebridge and after a further 1.5 miles (2.5 km) it joins the Spey near the village of Kincraig.

== Etymology ==
The name of the river and the glen which it occupies derives from the Gaelic faith meaning 'boggy place' and isidh signifying 'pasture land'.

== Glen Feshie estate ==
The east side of Glen Feshie was primarily Mackintosh land. On the west side, the Forest of Feshie was a hunting ground of the Dukes of Gordon. From 1752 it was leased to the Macphersons of Invereshie as sheilings. In the late 18th and early 19th centuries the Glen Feshie Wood Company was active in extracting timber from Aeneas Mackintosh's land at Ruigh Aiteachain. In 1804, Mackintosh and George Macpherson Grant of Ballindalloch fell into dispute over damage to floodbanks caused by logs being floated down the river. In 1815, Alexander Gordon, 4th Duke of Gordon, sold his Glen Feshie land to George Macpherson Grant of Ballindalloch.

The Duke and Duchess of Bedford first leased the Invereshie shootings from George Macpherson Grant of Ballindalloch in 1818, beginning a lifelong sporting association with Glen Feshie. From 1829 Macpherson Grant began to impose limitations on sheep numbers on the upland grazings on which his farming tenants relied. In 1839, he converted his sheep range in Glen Feshie into a deer forest. In the late 1840s, the Duchess had Alexander Mackintosh of Mackintosh convert the Bedford shootings on the east side of Glen Feshie into a deer forest.

For an extended period in the 20th century the Glen Feshie estate was owned by the Dulverton family, before being bought by the Danish retail magnate Klaus Helmerson in the late 1990s. In 2006, the estate was bought by the Danish businessman Anders Holch Povlsen, who expanded it by buying the neighbouring 4,000 acre (1,600 ha) farm of Killiehuntly.
