= Lord George Hamilton =

British politician (1845–1927)

The Right Honourable Lord George Hamilton GCSI JP
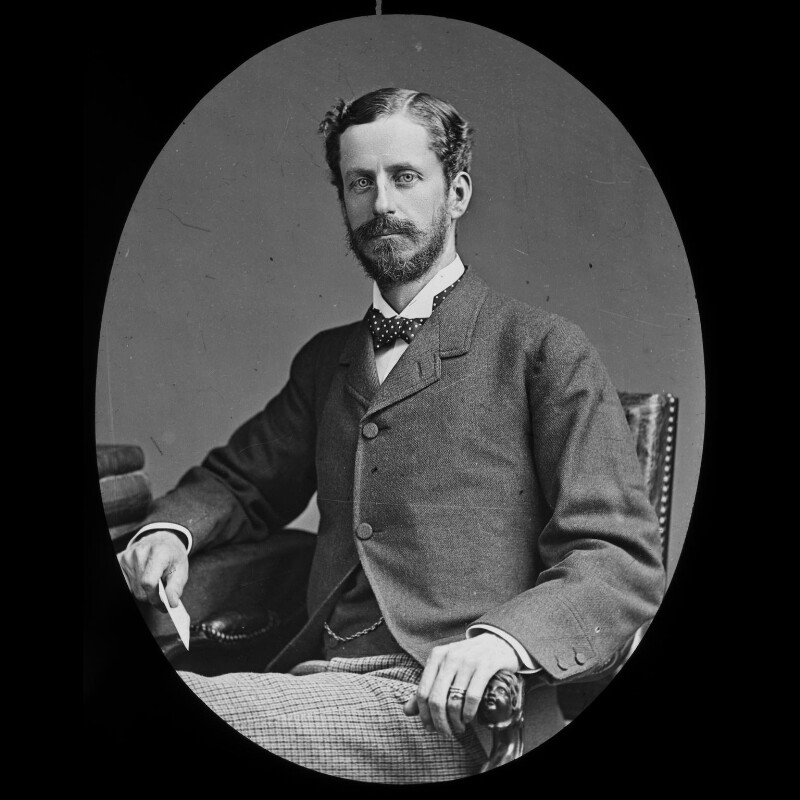
- Hamilton in 1890

First Lord of the Admiralty
- In office 24 June 1885 – 28 January 1886
- Monarch: Queen Victoria
- Prime Minister: The Marquess of Salisbury
- Preceded by: The Earl of Northbrook
- Succeeded by: The Marquess of Ripon
- In office 9 August 1886 – 11 August 1892
- Monarch: Queen Victoria
- Prime Minister: The Marquess of Salisbury
- Preceded by: The Marquess of Ripon
- Succeeded by: The Earl Spencer

Secretary of State for India
- In office 4 July 1895 – 9 October 1903
- Monarchs: Queen Victoria; Edward VII
- Prime Minister: The Marquess of Salisbury; Arthur Balfour
- Preceded by: Henry Fowler
- Succeeded by: Hon. St John Brodrick

Personal details
- Born: 17 December 1845 Brighton, Sussex
- Died: 22 September 1927 (aged 81) Marylebone, London
- Party: Conservative
- Spouse(s): Lady Maud Lascelles (1846–1938)
- Children: 3
- Parent(s): James Hamilton, 1st Duke of Abercorn; Lady Louisa Russell
- Education: Harrow School

Lord George Francis Hamilton GCSI PC JP (17 December 1845 – 22 September 1927) was a British Conservative Party politician of the late 19th and early 20th centuries who served as First Lord of the Admiralty and Secretary of State for India.

== Background ==
Hamilton was born in Brighton into the aristocracy, the third son of James, Marquess of Abercorn (later the Duke of Abercorn) and Lady Louisa, daughter of John Russell, 6th Duke of Bedford. His parents were "long remembered as the handsomest and most distinguished couple of their time."

He was educated at Harrow. He served with the Rifle Brigade and Coldstream Guards, achieving the rank of lieutenant.

== Political career ==
Hamilton was Member of Parliament for Middlesex between 1868 and 1885 and for Ealing between 1885 and 1906. He served under Benjamin Disraeli as Under-Secretary of State for India from 1874 to 1878 and as Vice-President of the Committee on Education from 1878 to 1880 and was sworn of the Privy Council in 1878.

He entered the cabinet as First Lord of the Admiralty under Lord Salisbury in 1885, a post he held until 1886 and again between 1886 and 1892. In 1894 he was elected as Chairman of the London School Board, standing down after one year when the Unionists won the general election and he became Secretary of State for India under Salisbury, which he remained until 1903, the last year under the premiership of Arthur Balfour. He was appointed a Knight Grand Commander of the Order of the Star of India (GCSI) in the 1903 Durbar Honours, and was knighted and invested with the decoration by King Edward VII on 28 January 1903, during a visit to Windsor Castle.

In 1916 he was part of the Mesopotamia Commission of Inquiry.

== Other public appointments ==
For a number of years, Hamilton was a member of the board of the Underground Electric Railways Company of London (UERL) which ran the majority of London's Underground lines. He served as the company's chairman between 1915 and 1919, following the resignation of Sir Edgar Speyer in 1915.

Hamilton also held the honorary posts of Captain of Deal Castle (1899–1923) and Major of Deal (1909) and received the degree of honorary LLD from Glasgow University and of honorary DCL from the University of Oxford. He was also a Justice of Peace for Middlesex and Westminster. Hamilton was a Founder of the London School Board Masonic Lodge No. 2611 in 1896

He was also President of the Royal Statistical Society from 1910 to 1912 and from 1915 to 1916.

== Family and children ==
Hamilton married Lady Maud Caroline, daughter of Henry Lascelles, 3rd Earl of Harewood, in 1871. They had three sons:

- Ronald James Hamilton OBE (1872–1958), who fought in the First World War, was wounded and in 1919 invested an OBE. He was awarded with the decoration of the Order of the Crown (Belgium). He served as First Secretary in the Diplomatic Service. In 1915 he married Florence Marguerite (Sarah Brooke) Hanna (d. 1959). They had one daughter:
  - Maud Sarah Hamilton (1917–1995). In 1939 she married Squadron Leader Count Manfred Maria Edmund Ralph Beckett Czernin von und zu Chudenitz, DFC, DSO, MC, RAF (1913–1962). With him she had one son and one daughter.
- Major Anthony George Hamilton (1874–1936), who fought in the First World War with the East Kent Regiment. He died unmarried and without issue.
- Vice-Admiral Robert Cecil Hamilton (1882–1947), who fought in the First World War. In 1911 he married Edith Maud Paley (d. 1967), daughter of the barrister Algernon Herbert Paley.

Hamilton died in September 1927, aged 81, at his house in Portman Square, London. His wife survived him by eleven years and died in April 1938.

Parliament of the United Kingdom
Preceded by Viscount Enfieldand; Henry Labouchère	Member of Parliament for Middlesex; 1868 – 1885; With: Viscount Enfield 1857–1874; Octavius Edward Coope 1874–1885	Constituency abolished
New constituency	Member of Parliament for Ealing; 1885 – 1906	Succeeded by Sir Herbert Nield
Political offices
Preceded by M. E. Grant Duff	Under-Secretary of State for India; 1874 – 1878	Succeeded by Hon. Edward Stanhope
Preceded by Viscount Sandon	Vice-President of the Committee on Education; 1878–1880	Succeeded by A. J. Mundella
Preceded by The Earl of Northbrook	First Lord of the Admiralty; 1885 – 1886	Succeeded by The Marquess of Ripon
Preceded by The Marquess of Ripon	First Lord of the Admiralty; 1886 – 1892	Succeeded by The Earl Spencer
Preceded by Henry Fowler	Secretary of State for India; 1895 – 1903	Succeeded by Hon. St John Brodrick
Government offices
Preceded by Joseph Diggle	Chairman of the London School Board; 1894 – 1895	Succeeded by The Marquess of Londonderry
Business positions
Preceded by Sir Edgar Speyer	Chairman, Underground Electric Railways Company of London; 1915–1919	Succeeded by Sir Albert Stanley
