= Invereshie and Inshriach National Nature Reserve =

National nature reserve in Highland, Scotland

- IUCN category IV (habitat/species management area)
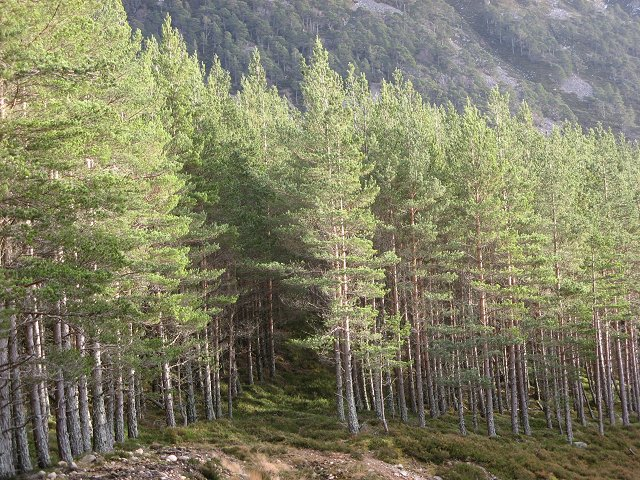
- Scots pines below the crags of Creag Mhigeachaidh

- Location within Highland
- Location: Highland, Scotland
- Coordinates: 57°05′51″N 3°51′08″W
- Area: 37.3 km^{2} (14.4 sq mi)
- Designation: NatureScot
- Established: 2007
- Owner: NatureScot & Forestry and Land Scotland
- Website: Invereshie and Inshriach National Nature Reserve

Invereshie and Inshriach (Scottish Gaelic: Inbhir Fheisidh agus Na h-Innse Riabhaich) is a national nature reserve on the western flank of the Cairngorms in the Highland council area of Scotland. The reserve covers habitats at a range of different altitudes, ranging from Caledonian Forest beside the River Feshie in the west, via bog and open moorland, to an arctic-alpine environment on the Cairngorm plateau. The Munro summit of Sgòr Gaoith (1118 m) lies on the eastern boundary of the reserve. The forested areas of the reserve form part of an expanse of Caledonian pinewood that stretches from Glen Feshie to Abernethy, and which as a whole forms the largest single area of this habitat remaining in Scotland. The reserve is owned and managed jointly by NatureScot and Forestry and Land Scotland (FLS): NatureScot own the Invereshie portion of the reserve and FLS the Inshriach area.

There are no waymarked trails at the reserve; however, several paths do run through it, starting from Coire Ruadh or Achlean in Glen Feshie. The paths through the reserve are regularly used by hillwalkers to access the summit of Sgòr Gaoith.

== Flora and fauna ==
Probably the most significant habitat at the reserve is the Caledonian Forest, which covers the landscape between about 250-630 m above sea level. Invereshie is often considered to be one of the best examples of this habitat, with the montane scrub zone at Creag Fhiaclach being perhaps the only example of a truly natural tree line in Scotland. The forest consists chiefly of Scots pine, with scattered examples of rowan, birch, aspen, alder, juniper and holly. Some areas of Inshriach were planted with non-native species for commercial reasons, however these trees have largely been removed, and these areas are now developing into a semi-natural pineforest. The forest floor hosts a wide array of plants, including heather, blaeberry and cowberry, and many species of mosses, lichens and fungi. There are also areas of bog woodland, where wet conditions inhibit tree growth. Here, plant species like cross-leaved heath, cotton grass and various species of sphagnum moss thrive. At the upper edge of Invereshie the climate causes pines and juniper to grow into twisted, stunted forms known as krummholz. Above the krummholz the landscape is more open, and consists of wet and dry heaths and blanket bog. These open mountain habitats host plants that are specially adapted to harsh conditions, with species such as twinflower, cloudberry, bladderwort, yellow saxifrage, alpine lady’s mantle, trailing azalea and purple saxifrage all present.

Wood ants form an important part of the ecosystem of the Caledonian Forest, which also supports a wide range of other invertebrate life. Many of the species found here are otherwise scarce in Britain, with the green hairstreak butterfly being one example. The large heath, dingy skipper and pearl-bordered fritillary have also been found at Invereshie and Inshriach. Other rare invertebrates include Chamaesyrphus scaevoides (a hoverfly) and Hybomitra lurida (a horsefly). The bog woodlands attract dragonflies and damselflies, including the northern damselfly (Scotland’s rarest damselfly), the northern emerald and the white-faced darter. On the mountain plateau the black mountain moth has been found.

The woodland is home to many species of bird which are otherwise rare or uncommon, such as Scottish crossbill (Scotland's only endemic bird species), crested tit, capercaillie and black grouse. The forested parts of Invereshie and Inshriach supports Scotland's most successful breeding population of capercaillie, whilst the montane areas support ptarmigan and snow bunting, these being complemented by the arrival of summer breeders such as dotterel. Raptors such as golden eagle, merlin and osprey can also be sighted.

The streams and lochs of the forest are ideal for otters. Red squirrels and pine martens are widespread in the pineforest, and pipistrelle and brown long-eared bats are also present. The montane areas support a population of mountain hare.

== History ==
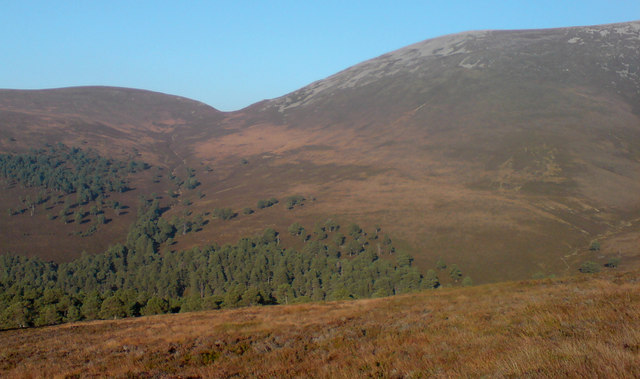
Regeneration of the forest is now leading to the re-establishment of a natural treeline

Caledonian Forest first became established in Invereshie and Inshriach at the end of the last ice age. Although humans are known to have lived in the area since at least the Bronze Age, until around the mid-18th century the forest remained largely intact, with only small-scale felling of trees for domestic use and localised rough grazing.

As the population of Scotland grew during the second half of the 18th century more people began to move into the glens of the Cairngorms, including Glen Feshie, and land began to be cleared for agriculture. From 1780, the Invereshie estate was managed by Captain John Macpherson (1751 - 1799), firstly on behalf of his father George (1702 - 1795), and then his older brother William (1733 - 1812). He and his father gradually modernised the estate, replacing the old runrig townships with small but self-sufficient single-tenant farms. George Macpherson Grant of Ballindalloch (1781 - 1846) inherited the Invereshie estate from his uncle William in 1812.

Development accelerated during the Napoleonic Wars, when high stock prices boosted incomes and there was increased demand for timber. Several water-driven sawmills were built along the River Feshie and its tributaries during this period. There was also extensive construction of embankments to increase the grazing potential of the Invereshie Meadows on the floodplains of the Rivers Feshie and Spey. Demand for timber continued throughout the 19th century, especially with the coming of the railways, as timber was required for sleepers, bridges and buildings.

In 1850 Invereshie was converted into a deer forest, as deer stalking and grouse shooting became popular amongst Britain's upper classes. The subsequent increase in deer numbers, alongside management practices such as muirburn (the burning of patches of heather to create habitats for grouse) led to a reduction in natural regeneration of the native woodland.

Demand for timber increased again during the First and Second World Wars, and by the end of the Second World War only woods in the most remote parts of Scotland were still intact. Following this period, interest in preserving the remaining woodlands grew, and the Nature Conservancy (NC) purchased Invereshie in 1954, making the area part of the Cairngorms National Nature Reserve. The NC, and its successor bodies, the Nature Conservancy Council (NCC), Scottish Natural Heritage (SNH), and NatureScot, made efforts to encourage regrowth of the woodland, reducing deer numbers, erecting fences to exclude deer, and planting native tree species. During this period the Inshriach Estate, to the west of Invereshie, came under the ownership of the Forestry Commission. During the 1960s and 70s Inshriach was managed mainly for commercial forestry, and non-native species such as sitka spruce and lodgepole pine were planted in the area. Since the 1990s the emphasis has changed, and the Commission began work aimed at restoring the native forest.

Following a review of the Cairngorms NNR in 2006 it was decided that the NNR should be broken up into separate, smaller reserves that reflected existing management units. The new Invereshie and Inshriach NNR was declared in September 2007, combining the SNH-owned Invereshie estate with part of the neighbouring Inshriach Forest, which had been previously outwith the Cairngorms NNR.

== Conservation designations ==
In addition to being a national nature reserve (NNR), Invereshie and Inshriach lies within a number of other protected areas of Scotland. It forms part of the Cairngorms Site of Special Scientific Interest (SSSI), the Cairngorms Special Protection Area (SPA), and the Cairngorms Special Area of Conservation (SAC). It also lies within the Cairngorms National Park. The Invereshie and Inshriach NNR is classified as a Category IV protected area by the International Union for Conservation of Nature.
