= James Hamilton, 1st Duke of Abercorn =

British Conservative statesman (1811–1885)

His Grace The Duke of Abercorn KG KP PC
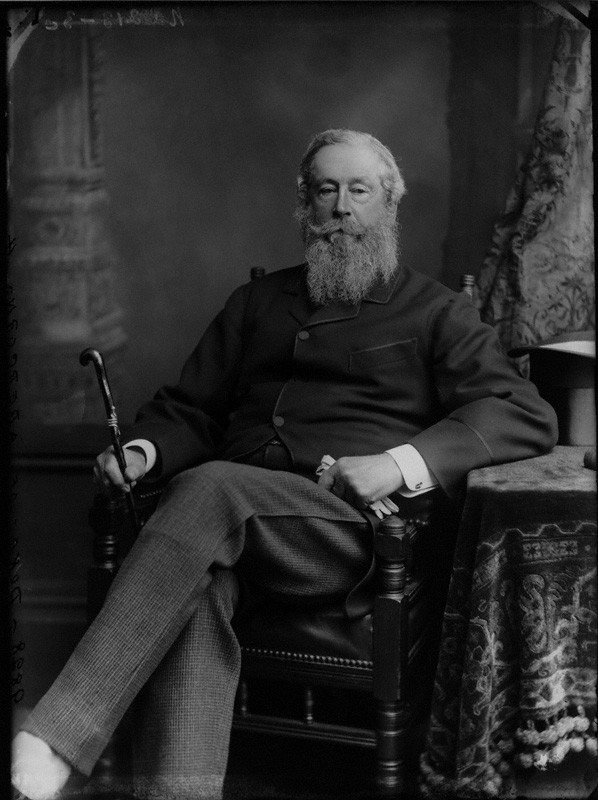
- Photograph by Alexander Bassano, c. 1884

Lord Lieutenant of Ireland
- In office 13 July 1866 – 1 December 1868
- Monarch: Victoria
- Prime Minister: The Earl of Derby; Benjamin Disraeli
- Preceded by: The Lord Wodehouse
- Succeeded by: The Earl Spencer
- In office 2 March 1874 – 11 December 1876
- Monarch: Victoria
- Prime Minister: Benjamin Disraeli
- Preceded by: The Earl Spencer
- Succeeded by: The Duke of Marlborough

Personal details
- Born: 21 January 1811 Mayfair, Westminster, Middlesex, England
- Died: 31 October 1885 (aged 74) Baronscourt, County Tyrone, United Kingdom
- Party: Conservative
- Spouse: Lady Louisa Russell (m. 1832)
- Children: Harriet, Countess of Lichfield; Beatrix, Countess of Durham; Louisa, Duchess of Buccleuch and Queensberry; James, 2nd Duke of Abercorn; Katherine, Countess of Mount Edgcumbe; Georgiana, Countess Winterton; Lord Claud Hamilton; Lord George Hamilton; Albertha, Duchess of Marlborough; Lord Ronald Douglas Hamilton; Maud, Marchioness of Lansdowne; Lord Cosmo Hamilton; Lord Frederick Spencer Hamilton; Lord Ernest Hamilton
- Parents: James, Viscount Hamilton; Harriet Douglas
- Education: Christ Church, Oxford

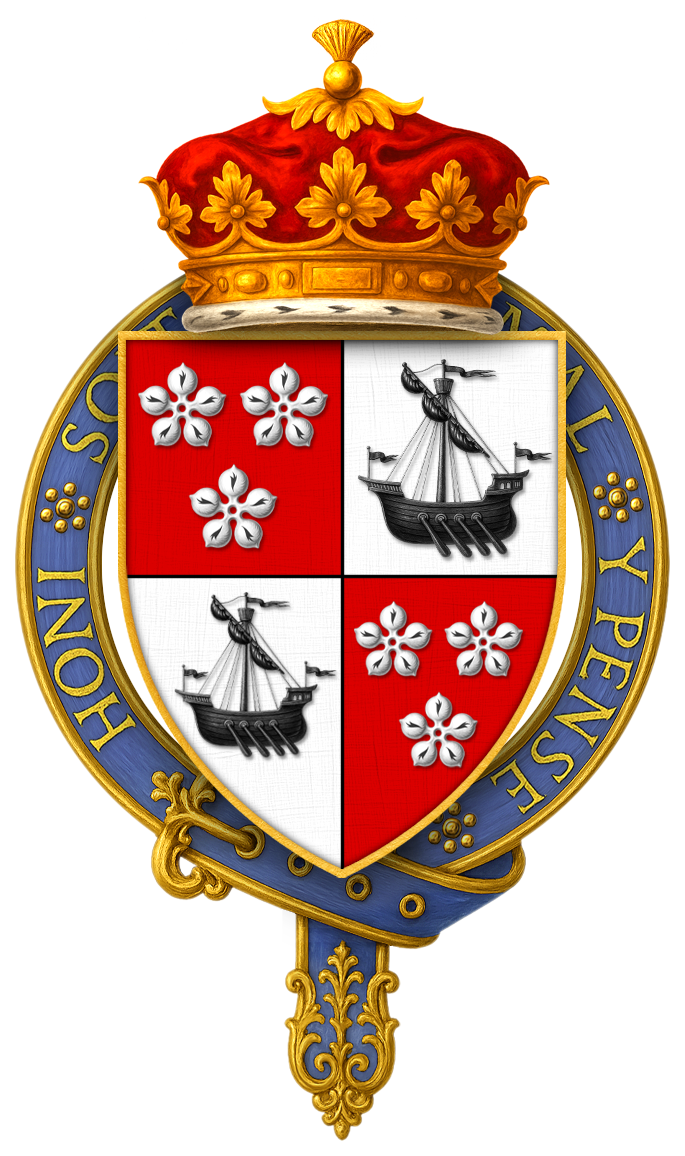
Quartered arms of James Hamilton, 1st Duke of Abercorn, KG, KP, PC

James Hamilton, 1st Duke of Abercorn (21 January 1811 – 31 October 1885), styled Viscount Hamilton from 1814 to 1818 and The Marquess of Abercorn from 1818 to 1868, was a Conservative statesman who twice served as Lord Lieutenant of Ireland.

== Background and education ==
Born into an Anglo-Irish (or rather Scottish) aristocratic family at Seymour Place, Mayfair, on 21 January 1811. Abercorn was the son of James, Viscount Hamilton (the eldest son of The 1st Marquess of Abercorn). His mother, Harriet, was the second daughter of The Hon. John Douglas (the son of The 14th Earl of Morton). His father died when Abercorn was only three. In 1818, aged seven, he succeeded his grandfather in his titles and estates. He was educated at Harrow School and Christ Church, Oxford, where he matriculated on 2 July 1829.

== Political career ==
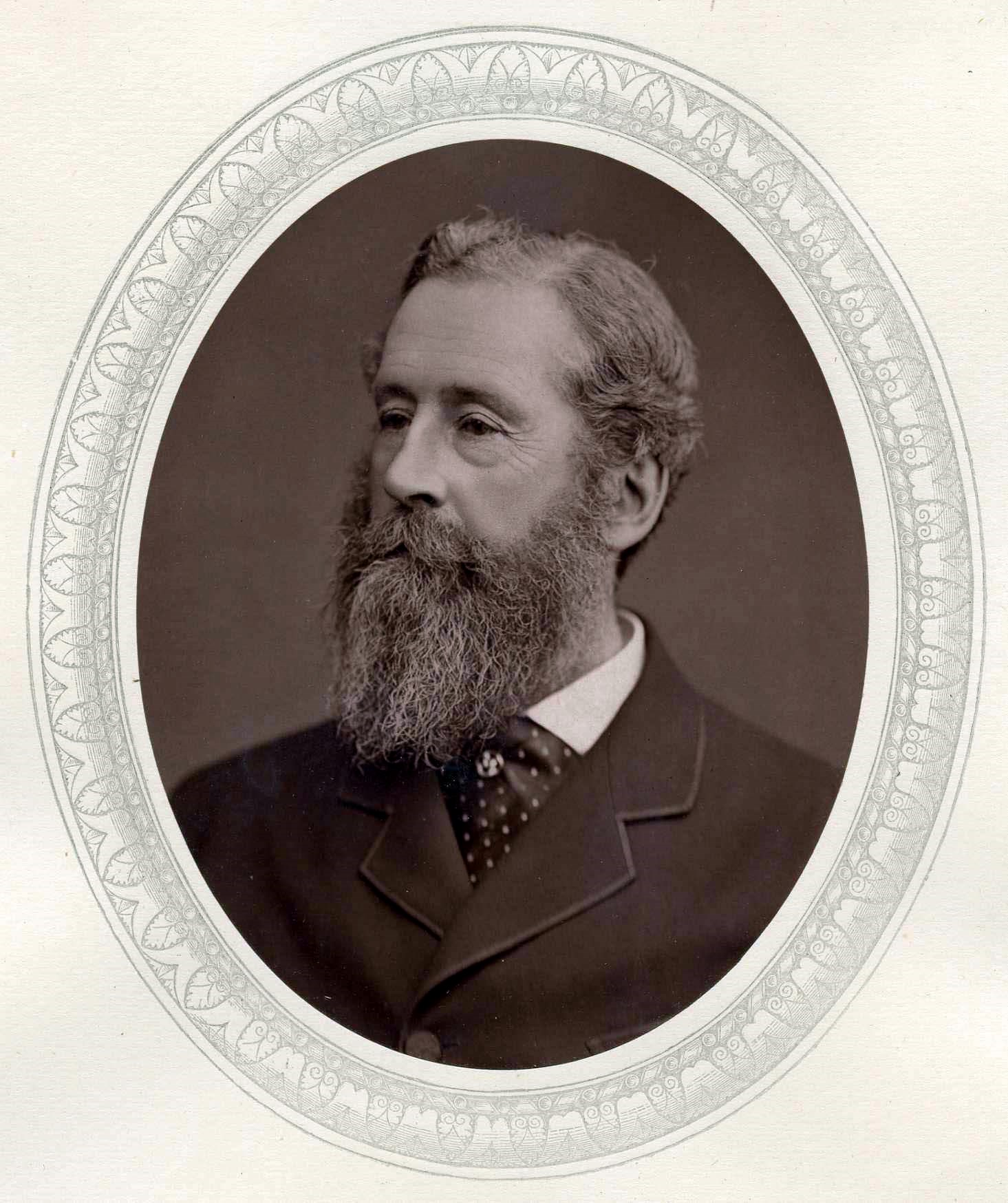
James, 1st Duke of Abercorn.

Lord Abercorn was first appointed a deputy lieutenant of County Tyrone, where he had a family seat at Baronscourt. On 13 November 1844, Lord Abercorn was appointed Lord Lieutenant of Donegal. The next month, on 12 December 1844, he was made a Knight of the Garter at the relatively young age of 33.

Abercorn was appointed Groom of the Stole to Prince Albert on 8 February 1846, and shortly thereafter, on 25 February 1846, was made a Privy Counsellor. He served as Groom of the Stole until June 1859, and remained a prominent figure in the royal court for the next two decades. He received two honorary degrees during this period, becoming an LL.D. of Cambridge on 5 July 1847, a DCL of Oxford on 4 June 1856. From 11 April 1855 to 22 September 1860, he was Honorary Colonel of the Prince of Wales's Own Donegal Militia, and on 18 February 1860, was commissioned as a Captain in the newly raised London Scottish Rifle Volunteers.

On 6 July 1866, he was appointed Lord Lieutenant (Viceroy) of Ireland, under the third ministry of Lord Derby. He retained the post after Derby resigned in February 1868 and Benjamin Disraeli took the reins of the ministry. On 10 August 1868, he was created Marquess of Hamilton and Duke of Abercorn in the Peerage of Ireland. Around this time, he received his third honorary degree, an LL.D. from Trinity College, Dublin. After Gladstone and the Liberals won the 1868 general election, Abercorn resigned the Lord-Lieutenancy on 14 December.

Abercorn, his wife and one of his daughters appeared, thinly disguised, in Disraeli's 1870 novel Lothair.

After the formation of the second Disraeli ministry, Abercorn was again appointed Lord Lieutenant of Ireland on 2 March 1874, and was also chosen Grand Master of the Grand Lodge of Ireland, a post he held until his death. He resigned the Lord-Lieutenancy again on 6 December 1876, partly on account of his wife's ill health.

Abercorn was Envoy-Extraordinary for the investiture of King Umberto I of Italy with the Order of the Garter on 2 March 1878. He was elected Chancellor of the University of Ireland in 1881, and died four years later at his home of Baronscourt, County Tyrone on 31 October 1885. He is buried in the cemetery at Baronscourt Parish Church, the traditional burial place of the Dukes of Abercorn and their families.

== Sporting interests ==
Abercorn was the shooting tenant of Ewen Macpherson of Cluny at Loch Ericht and Benalder in the Central Highlands of Scotland. In 1836, William Mitchell (1756 - c.1839), one of Badenoch's biggest farmers, was obliged to surrender his Benalder sheep walk to accommodatate the Marquess's shooting interests. In 1839 Abercorn built a large shooting lodge at Ardverikie on the south side of Loch Laggan, where the painter Sir Edwin Landseer was one of the shooting guests.

== Family and children ==
Abercorn married Lady Louisa, second daughter of John Russell, 6th Duke of Bedford, in 1832. They had fourteen children, thirteen of whom survived infancy, among them seven daughters, all of whom were ordered to marry into the peerage and no one beneath the rank of an earl:

- Lady Harriet Georgiana Louisa Hamilton (1834–1913), married in 1855 to Thomas George Anson, 2nd Earl of Lichfield. They had eight sons and five daughters.
- Lady Beatrix Frances Hamilton (1835–1871), married in 1854 to George Frederick D'Arcy Lambton, 2nd Earl of Durham
- Lady Louisa Jane Hamilton (1836–1912), married in 1859 to William Montagu Douglas Scott, 6th Duke of Buccleuch
- James Hamilton, 2nd Duke of Abercorn (1838–1913)
- Lady Katherine Elizabeth Hamilton (1840–1874), married in 1858 to William Henry Edgcumbe, 4th Earl of Mount Edgcumbe
- Lady Georgiana Susan Hamilton (1841–1913), married in 1882 to Edward Turnour, 5th Earl Winterton
- Lord Claud Hamilton (1843–1925)
- Lord George Hamilton (1845–1927)
- Lady Albertha Frances Anne Hamilton (1847–1932), married in 1869 to George Charles Spencer-Churchill, 8th Duke of Marlborough. The marriage was annulled in 1883.
- Lord Ronald Douglas Hamilton (1849–1867)
- Lady Maud Evelyn Hamilton (1850–1932), married in 1869 to Henry Petty-Fitzmaurice, 5th Marquess of Lansdowne
- Lord Cosmo Hamilton (1853, died on the same day as his birth)
- Lord Frederic Spencer Hamilton (1856–1928)
- Lord Ernest Hamilton (1858–1939)

Abercorn died in October 1885, aged 74, and was succeeded by his eldest son, James. The Duchess of Abercorn died in March 1905, aged 92.

== Notes ==
Political offices
Preceded by The Earl of Kimberley	Lord Lieutenant of Ireland; 1866–1868	Succeeded by The Earl Spencer
Preceded by The Earl Spencer	Lord Lieutenant of Ireland; 1874–1876	Succeeded by The Duke of Marlborough
Honorary titles
Preceded by The Marquess of Donegall	Lord Lieutenant of Donegal; 1844–1885	Succeeded by The Duke of Abercorn
Preceded by The Earl of Leitrim	Custos Rotulorum of Donegal; 1855–1885	Succeeded by The Duke of Abercorn
Court offices
Preceded by The Marquess of Exeter	Groom of the Stole to Prince Albert; 1846–1859	Succeeded by The Earl Spencer
Masonic offices
Preceded by The Duke of Leinster	Grandmaster of the Grand Lodge of Ireland; 1874–1885	Succeeded by The 2nd Duke of Abercorn
Peerage of Great Britain
Preceded by John Hamilton	Marquess of Abercorn; 1818–1885	Succeeded by James Hamilton
Peerage of Ireland
New creation	Duke of Abercorn; 1868–1885	Succeeded by James Hamilton
