= Lord Edward Russell (1805–1887) =

Royal Navy Admiral and Whig politician (1805–1887)

Admiral Lord Edward Russell CB

Member of Parliament for Tavistock
- In office 29 June 1841 – 29 July 1847
- Preceded by: Lord Russell, John Rundle
- Succeeded by: Hon. Edward Russell, Sir John Salusbury-Trelawny, Bt

Personal details
- Born: 24 April 1805
- Died: 21 May 1887 (aged 82)
- Spouse: Mary Ann Taylor
- Parent(s): John Russell, 6th Duke of Bedford; Lady Georgina Gordon

Military service
- Allegiance: United Kingdom
- Branch/service: Royal Navy
- Years of service: 1819–1887
- Rank: Admiral
- Commands: HMS Britomart; HMS Savage; HMS Nimrod; HMS Actaeon; HMS Vengeance
- Battles/wars: Greek War of Independence; Battle of Navarino; Crimean War; Siege of Sevastopol

Admiral Lord Edward Russell, CB (24 April 1805 – 21 May 1887) was a British naval officer and Whig politician.

== Early life ==
He was the son of John Russell, 6th Duke of Bedford, and his second wife Lady Georgina Gordon, and was the younger half-brother of future Prime Minister John Russell.

== Career ==
Russell gained the rank of midshipman in 1819 in the service of the Royal Navy, and of lieutenant in 1826. He fought in the Battle of Navarino in 1827, the victory over the Turks. He gained the rank of commander in 1828, and of captain in 1833.

He was elected unopposed as Member of Parliament (MP) for Tavistock at the 1841 general election, but did not stand again in 1847. He held the office of Naval Aide-de-Camp to HM Queen Victoria between 1846 and 1850. He was invested as a Companion of the Order of the Bath in 1855. He gained the rank of rear-admiral in 1856. He gained the rank of vice-admiral in 1863. He gained the rank of admiral in 1867.

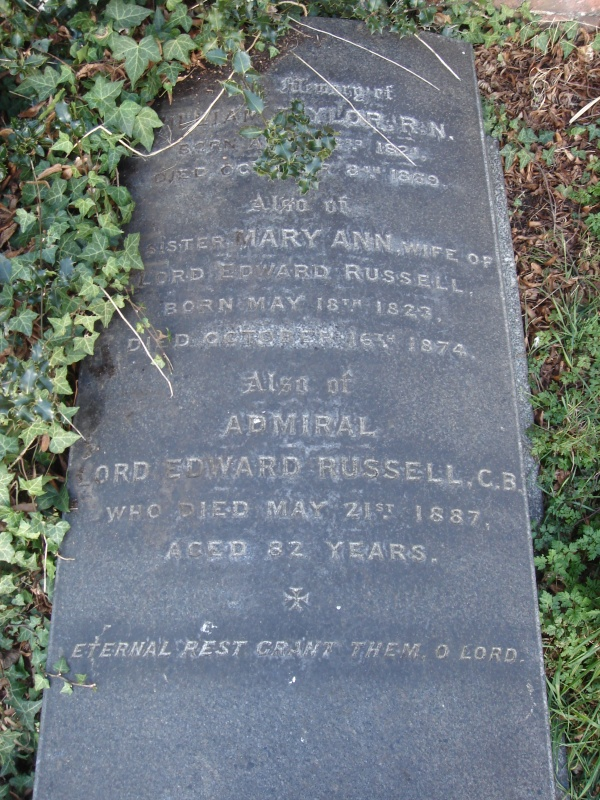
Funerary monument, Brompton Cemetery, London

He died in 1887, aged 82, and is buried in Brompton Cemetery, London.

== Personal life ==
He married Mary Ann Taylor on 8 February 1860. They did not have any children. She died in 1874.

== Ancestry ==
Ancestors of Lord Edward Russell (1805–1887)

16. Wriothesley Russell, 2nd Duke of Bedford
8. John Russell, 4th Duke of Bedford
17. Elizabeth Howland
4. Francis Russell, Marquess of Tavistock
18. John Leveson-Gower, 1st Earl Gower
9. The Hon. Gertrude Leveson-Gower
19. Lady Evelyn Pierrepont
2. John Russell, 6th Duke of Bedford
20. Arnold van Keppel, 1st Earl of Albemarle
10. Willem van Keppel, 2nd Earl of Albemarle
21. Geertruid Johanna Quirina van der Duyn
5. Lady Elizabeth Keppel
22. Charles Lennox, 1st Duke of Richmond
11. Lady Anne Lennox
23. Anne Brudenell
1. Lord Edward Russell
24. Alexander Gordon, 2nd Duke of Gordon
12. Cosmo Gordon, 3rd Duke of Gordon
25. Lady Henrietta Mordaunt
6. Alexander Gordon, 4th Duke of Gordon
26. William Gordon, 2nd Earl of Aberdeen
13. Lady Catherine Gordon
27. Lady Susan Murray
3. Lady Georgina Gordon
28. Sir Alexander Maxwell, 2nd Baronet of Monreith, Wigtownshire
14. Sir William Maxwell, 3rd Baronet of Monreith, Wigtownshire
29. Lady Jean Montgomerie
7. Jane Maxwell
30. William Blair
15. Magdalen Blair
31. Catharine Tait

== See also ==
- O'Byrne, William Richard (1849). "Russell, Edward" . A Naval Biographical Dictionary . John Murray – via Wikisource.

Parliament of the United Kingdom
Preceded by Lord Russell; John Rundle	Member of Parliament for Tavistock; 1841 – 1847; With: John Rundle to 1843; John Salusbury Trelawny from 1843	Succeeded by Edward Russell; John Salusbury Trelawny
