= John Russell, 6th Duke of Bedford =

British politician (1766–1839)

His Grace The Duke of Bedford KG PC FSA
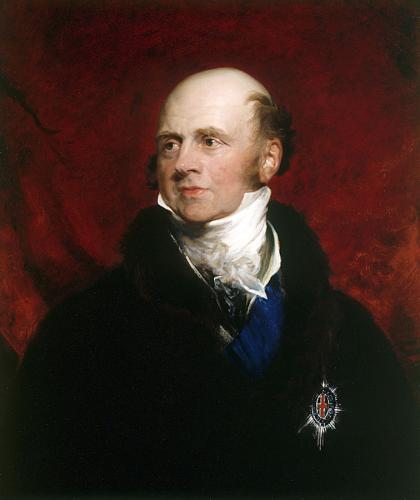
- Portrait of John Russell, 6th Duke of Bedford by Sir George Hayter in 1835

Lord Lieutenant of Ireland
- In office 12 March 1806 – 11 April 1807
- Monarch: George III
- Prime Minister: The Lord Grenville
- Preceded by: The Earl of Powis
- Succeeded by: The Duke of Richmond

Member of Parliament for Tavistock
- In office 1790–1802
- Succeeded by: Lord Robert Spencer
- In office 1788–1790
- Preceded by: Richard Rigby

Personal details
- Born: 6 July 1766 Woburn Abbey, Woburn, Bedfordshire, England
- Died: 20 October 1839 (aged 73)
- Spouse(s): Hon. Georgiana Byng (m. 1786; died 1801) Lady Georgiana Gordon (m. 1803)
- Children: 14, including Francis, George, John, Wriothesley, Edward, Charles, Louisa, Alexander, and Rachel
- Parent(s): Francis Russell, Marquess of Tavistock; Lady Elizabeth Keppel

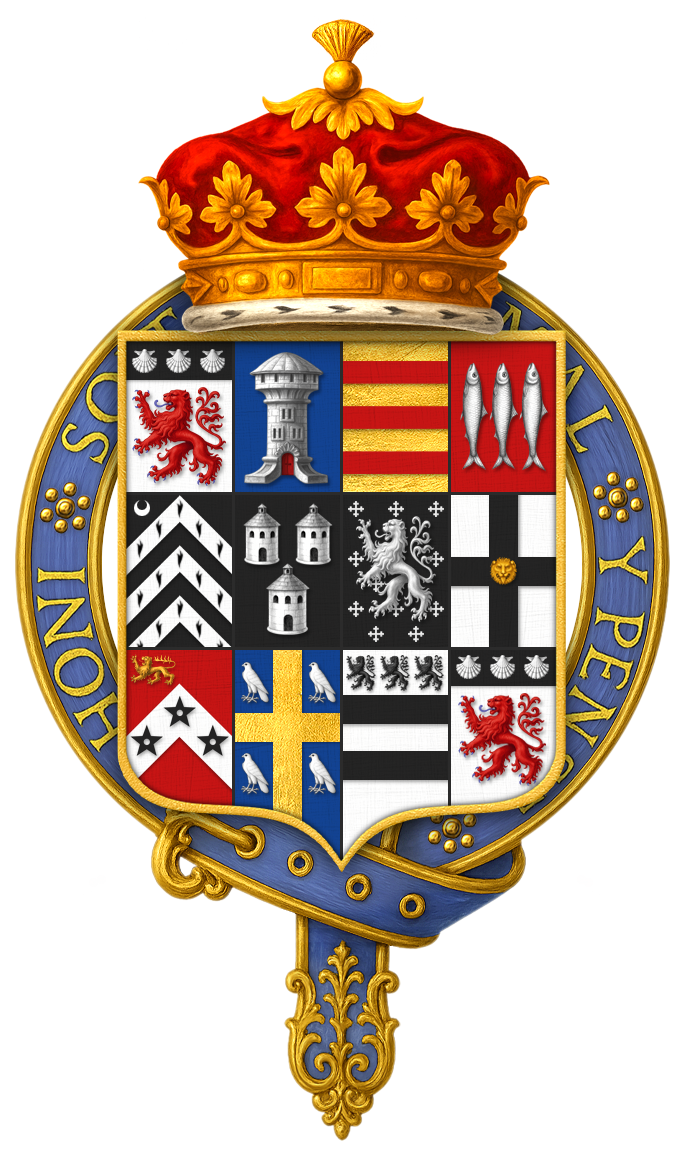
Quartered arms of John Russell, 6th Duke of Bedford, KG, PC, FSA

John Russell, 6th Duke of Bedford (6 July 1766 – 20 October 1839), known as Lord John Russell until 1802, was a British Whig politician who notably served as Lord Lieutenant of Ireland in the Ministry of All the Talents. He was the father of Prime Minister John Russell, 1st Earl Russell.

== Background ==
Bedford was a younger son of Francis Russell, Marquess of Tavistock, eldest son and heir of John Russell, 4th Duke of Bedford. His mother was Lady Elizabeth, the youngest child of Willem van Keppel, 2nd Earl of Albemarle and Lady Anne Lennox.

== Political career ==
Like most Russells, Bedford was a Whig in politics. He sat as Member of Parliament for Tavistock (Note: which had not seen any professedly Tory MPs since at least 1660) from 1788 to June 1790 and from December 1790 to 1802, when he was automatically elevated to the Lords on the death of his brother. He served as Lord Lieutenant of Ireland during the Whig government of 1806–1807. He became, as did many of his party who were strong followers of Bonapartism, opposed to the Peninsular War, believing that it neither could nor should be won. He funded, along with his son, many anti-war publications. Bedford was sworn of the Privy Council in 1806 and appointed a Knight of the Garter in 1830.

== Family ==
Georgiana Byng

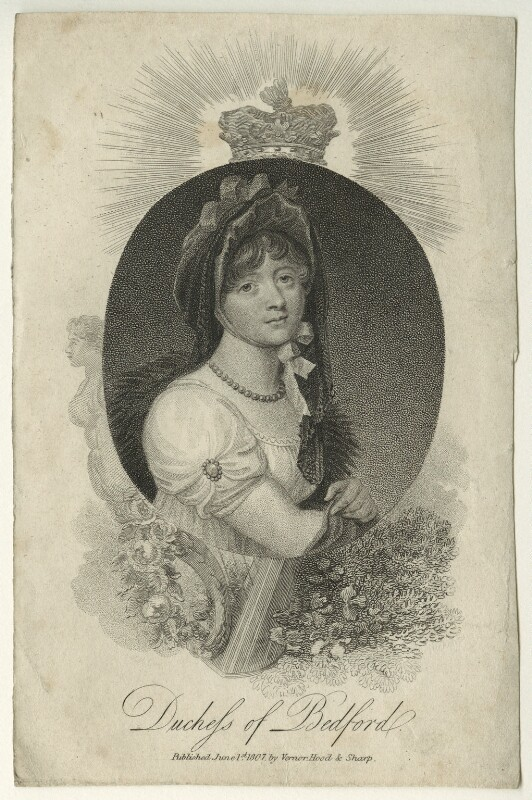
Georgiana Russell

Bedford married firstly the Hon. Georgiana Byng, daughter of George Byng, 4th Viscount Torrington, in 1786. The marriage lasted 15 years and they had three sons:

- Francis Russell, 7th Duke of Bedford
- Lord George William Russell
- Lord John Russell, Prime Minister of the United Kingdom, 1st Earl Russell and grandfather of philosopher Bertrand Russell.

After Georgiana's early death in October 1801, Bedford married secondly Lady Georgiana, daughter of Alexander Gordon, 4th Duke of Gordon, in 1803. They had ten children, including:

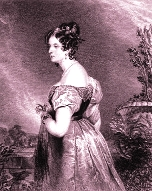
Georgina, Duchess of Bedford, 2nd wife of the 6th Duke of Bedford

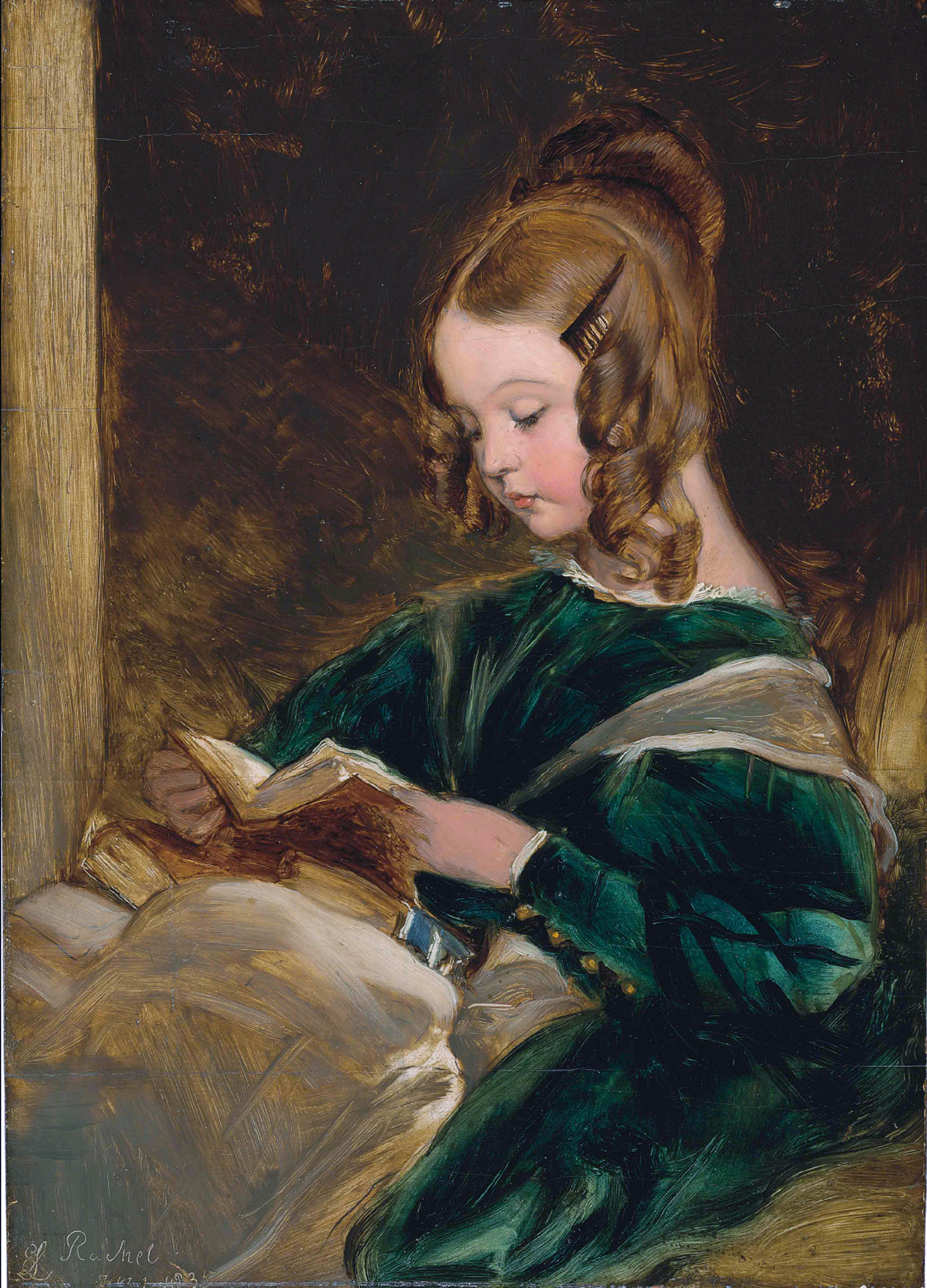
Study of Rachel Russell. Unsubstantiated gossip said that Rachel was the daughter of Edwin Landseer. (Edwin Henry Landseer, 1835)

- Reverend Lord Wriothesley Russell (11 May 1804 – 6 April 1886), married Elizabeth Russell, his first cousin, and had issue
- Admiral Lord Edward Russell (24 April 1805 – 21 May 1887), married Mary Ann Taylor and died without issue
- Lieutenant-Colonel Lord Charles James Fox Russell (10 February 1807 – 29 June 1894), married Isabella Davies and had issue
- Lady Georgiana Elizabeth Russell (23 June 1810 – 22 March 1867), married Charles Romilly and had issue
- Lady Louisa Jane Russell (8 July 1812 – 31 March 1905), married James Hamilton, 1st Duke of Abercorn and had issue.
- Lord Cosmo Russell (1817–1875)
- General Lord Alexander Russell (16 September 1821 – 10 January 1907), married Anne Holmes and had issue
- Lady Rachel Evelyn Russell(1826 – 21 February 1898), married Lord James Butler and had issue.

The Duchess of Bedford was a great patroness of the arts, and had a longstanding relationship with the painter Sir Edwin Landseer, a man twenty years her junior. The Bedfords' marriage was nevertheless considered to be a very happy one.

== Glen Feshie ==
In 1818, the Duke and Duchess of Bedford leased the Invereshie shootings in Badenoch from George Macpherson Grant of Ballindalloch, beginning a lifelong sporting association with Glen Feshie. The Duke built a timber shooting lodge (his 'shooting box') at Ruigh Fionntaig in the upper glen. In 1829, the Bedfords moved to the Mackintosh shootings on the east side of the glen, making the Doune House of Rothiemurchus their base. While there, the Duke's main focuses were the breeding of livestock and the collection of botanical specimens.

== Bedford Lodge ==
In 1823 the 6th Duke of Bedford was looking for a house in London and took the lease of one of the seven houses designed and built by John Tasker on Campden Hill, Kensington, for the sum of £5,250. The lodge, previously occupied by General Sir John Fraser and then a Major Colegrave, was a simple Regency villa. The Duke employed his architect Jeffry Wyatt, who had worked for him on Woburn Abbey, to enlarge the villa. After these developments were completed, for several years Bedford Lodge was valued more highly for rating purposes than Holland House. After the Duke's death in 1839, the Dowager Duchess continued to live at Bedford Lodge and made it a famous centre for social gatherings. Duchess of Bedford's Walk in Kensington is named in her honour. Shortly after her death in 1853, it was taken by the eighth Duke of Argyll, who renamed the house Argyll Lodge and kept it until his death in 1900.

== Footnotes and references ==
Notes

Citations

Parliament of Great Britain
Preceded by Richard Rigby; Richard FitzPatrick	Member of Parliament for Tavistock; 1788 – June 1790; With: Richard FitzPatrick	Succeeded by Richard FitzPatrick; Charles Wyndham
Preceded by Richard FitzPatrick; Charles Wyndham	Member of Parliament for Tavistock; December 1790 – 1801; With: Richard FitzPatrick	Succeeded by Parliament of the United Kingdom
Parliament of the United Kingdom
Preceded by Parliament of Great Britain	Member of Parliament for Tavistock; 1801–1802; With: Richard FitzPatrick	Succeeded by Richard FitzPatrick; Lord Robert Spencer
Political offices
Preceded by The Earl of Powis	Lord Lieutenant of Ireland; 1806–1807	Succeeded by The Duke of Richmond
Peerage of England
Preceded by Francis Russell	Duke of Bedford; 1802–1839	Succeeded by Francis Russell
Preceded by Francis Russell	Baron Howland of Streatham (descended by acceleration); 1802–1833	Succeeded by Francis Russell
