= Monreith =

Coordinates: 54.7333°N 4.5500°W

- Location within Dumfries and Galloway
- Council area: Dumfries and Galloway
- Lieutenancy area: Wigtown
- Country: Scotland
- Sovereign state: United Kingdom
- Post town: NEWTON STEWART
- Postcode district: DG8
- Dialling code: 01988
- Police: Scotland
- Fire: Scottish
- Ambulance: Scottish
- UK Parliament: Dumfries & Galloway
- Scottish Parliament: Galloway and Upper Nithsdale

Monreith (/mɒnˈriːθ/ mon-REETH; Scottish Gaelic: Am Monadh Rèidh) is a small seaside village in the Machars, in the historical county of Wigtownshire, Scotland.

A ruined church near Monreith is called "Kirkmaiden-in-Fernis" and was dedicated to St Medan. The chancel was rebuilt as a mausoleum for the Maxwell family of nearby Monreith House and in which is buried Sir Herbert Maxwell. Within the graveyard is the last resting place of Captain François Thurot, a French privateer captain who lost his life in a sea battle off the Mull of Galloway.

Above the church on the cliff is the memorial to Gavin Maxwell the naturalist, and author of Ring of Bright Water, an otter, sculpted in bronze by Penny Wheatley in 1978. On visits back to the family seat of Monreith House, Maxwell would exercise his tame otter Mijbil on the beach below.

The area around Monreith is also rich in prehistoric remains. Barsalloch Fort lies on the A747 west of Monreith between Monreith and Port William. It is the remains of an Iron Age promontory fort overlooking Monreith Bay. It is thought that the fort was associated with the Novantae people.

== See also ==
- Monreith House
