= Norcott =

Norcott is a surname. Notable people by that name include:

- William Norcott (satirist) (1770–1820), Irish lawyer and satirist.
- Geoff Norcott (born 1976), English comedian.
- Amos Norcott (1777–1838), British soldier.
- Charles Norcott (1849-1931), British soldier.
- William Norcott (1804–1886), British soldier.
- Flemming L. Norcott Jr. (born 1943), American judge.
