= Hugh Rowlands =

Recipient of the Victoria Cross

General Sir Hugh Rowlands VC KCB DL
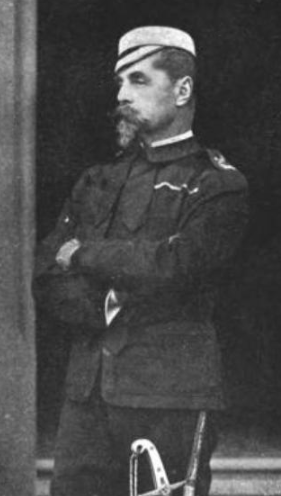
- Born: 6 May 1828; Llanrug, Wales
- Died: 1 August 1909 (aged 81); Llanrug, Wales
- Burial place: St Michael's Churchyard, Llanrug
- Military career
- Allegiance: United Kingdom
- Branch: British Army
- Rank: General
- Units: 41st (Welsh) Regiment of Foot; 34th Regiment of Foot
- Conflicts: Crimean War; Anglo-Zulu War
- Awards: Victoria Cross; Knight Commander of the Order of the Bath; Légion d'honneur (France); Order of the Medjidieh (Ottoman Empire)

General Sir Hugh Rowlands VC KCB DL (6 May 1828 – 1 August 1909) was a Welsh officer in the British Army and a recipient of the Victoria Cross for courageous action that led to the rescue of Colonel William O'Grady Haly during the Crimean War.

== Early life ==
Hugh Rowlands was born in the village of Plastirion, Llanrug. He was the second son of miner and Welsh landowner John Rowlands, heir to the Plastirion estate, and his wife Elizabeth (née Hartwell). His family claimed descent from Bleddyn ap Cynfyn, Prince of Powys, and Dafydd ap Llywelyn, Prince of Gwynedd and had resided in the area for almost 200 years. He was educated at Beaumaris Grammar School and Mr John Taylor's Cramming Academy, Woolwich.

== Career ==
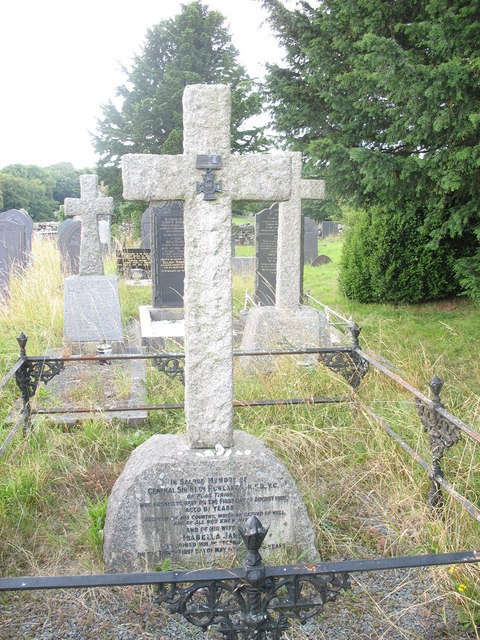
Rowlands' grave in Llanrug

Rowlands entered the military at the age of 21, purchasing a commission as an ensign in the 41st (Welch) Regiment of Foot, British Army. Rowlands served in Ireland, Malta and the Ionian Islands and was promoted to captain in the 41st in September 1854, during the Crimean War. He first saw action at the battle of the Alma in the same month and was present at Little Inkerman the following month.

On 5 November 1854 in the Crimea at Inkerman, Captain Rowlands and Private John McDermond rescued Colonel William O'Grady Haly of the 47th Regiment who had been wounded and surrounded by Russian soldiers. He also acted with great gallantry in holding the ground occupied by his advanced picquet against the enemy at the commencement of the Battle of Inkerman. For this action he became the first Welshman to be awarded the Victoria Cross.

He further distinguished himself during the siege of Sevastopol and was nominated for a Victoria Cross in recognition of his action during the second assault on the Redan in September 1855.

After service in the West Indies and India he was a Special Service officer in South Africa in 1878 and 1879. He was appointed Commandant of the Transvaal in 1878 and led an unsuccessful assault on the Pedi stronghold of Chief Sekhukhune. He served as a brigadier-general during the later stages of the Zulu War.

His latter years of service were spent in India where he commanded the Bangalore Division of the Madras Army and, on two occasions, took temporary command of the Madras Army. Returning to Britain he was appointed Lieutenant of the Tower of London in 1893 and Commander-in-Chief, Scotland in 1894 before retiring in 1896.

In October 1897 he was appointed colonel of the Duke of Wellington's Regiment, which he retained until his death at Plastirion on 1 August 1909.

== Further information ==
He later achieved the rank of General. He was born and died in Llanrug. His VC is on display at the Welch Regiment Museum in Cardiff Castle in Wales. He served as a deputy lieutenant of Caernarfonshire and was a justice of the peace in Caernarfonshire and in the Transvaal. His only son, Major Hugh Barrow Rowlands, Suffolk Regiment and King's African Rifles, died of wounds in Somaliland in 1903.

Colonel Rowlands and his officers 41st Regiment 1870

Military offices
Preceded by Arthur Lyon Fremantle	GOC Scottish District; 1894–1896	Succeeded by Edward Chapman
