= Richard O'Grady-Haly =

British Army general

Major-General Richard O'Grady-Haly CB DSO
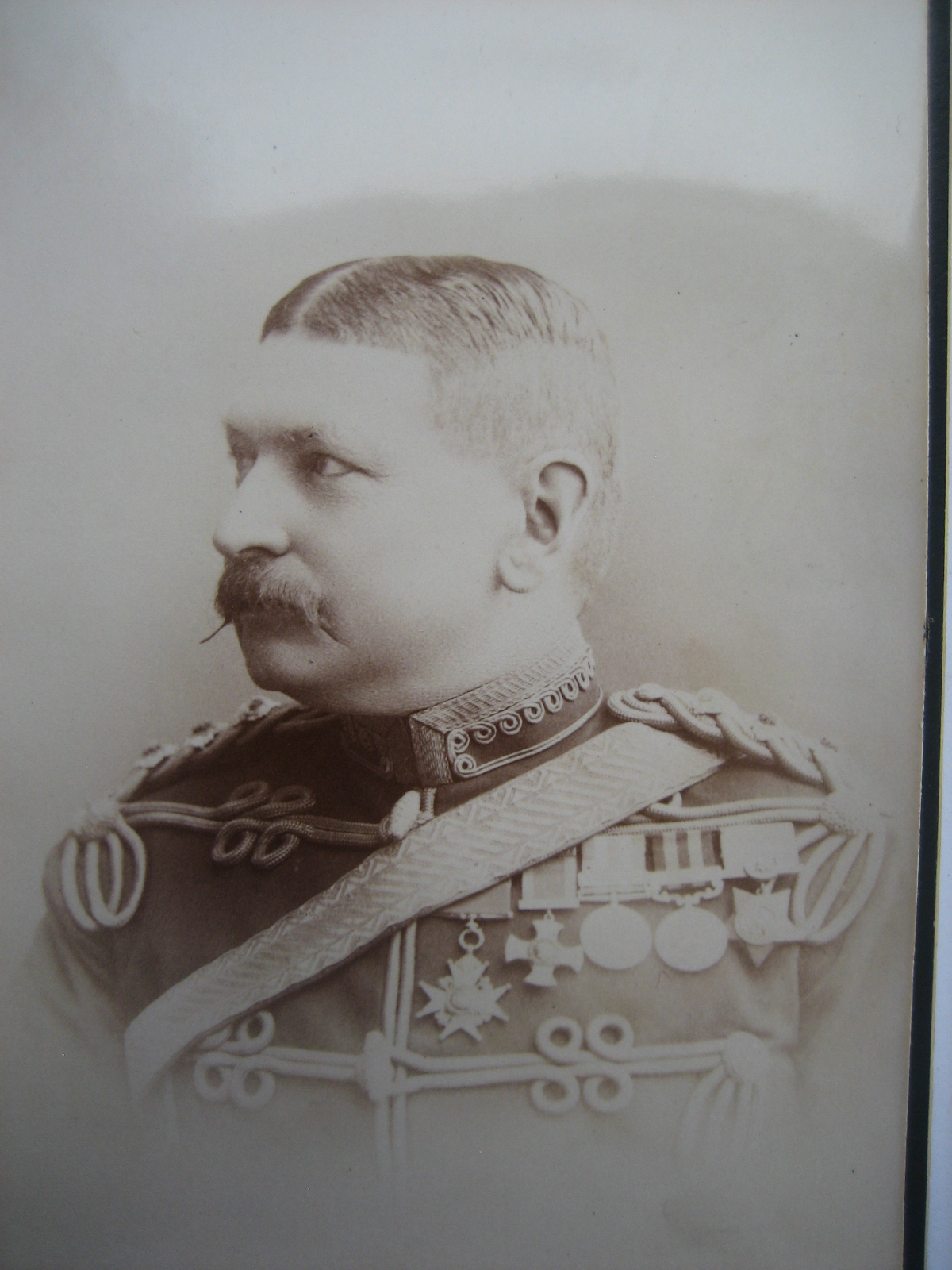
- Born: 22 February 1841; Frant, Sussex
- Died: 8 July 1911 (aged 70); Camberley, Surrey
- Burial place: Frimley, Surrey
- Relatives: General Sir William O'Grady Haly (father)
- Military career
- Allegiance: United Kingdom
- Branch: British Army
- Service years: 1858–c.1902
- Rank: Major-General
- Commands: General Officer Commanding the Militia of Canada; 1st Battalion Suffolk Regiment
- Conflicts: Mahdist War; Second Boer War
- Awards: Knight Commander of the Order of the Bath; Distinguished Service Order; Mentioned in dispatches

Major-General Richard Hebden O'Grady-Haly, CB, DSO (22 February 1841 – 8 July 1911) was a British Army officer who served as General Officer Commanding the Militia of Canada from 1900 to 1902.

== Military career ==
Born the son of General Sir William O'Grady Haly, O'Grady-Haly was commissioned into the British Army in 1858.

He served with the Nile Expedition in 1882 and took part in the action of El Maffar, both actions at Kassassin and the Battle of Tel el-Kebir.

He commanded the Second Column of the Hazara Field Force and was mentioned in dispatches in 1888.

He commanded the 1st Battalion the Suffolk Regiment in India and went on to be Assistant Adjutant-General in Belfast in 1891. He was appointed General Officer Commanding the Militia of Canada in 1900.

He also was a surveyor and when he was a lieutenant colonel, and invented a compass clinometer system which was built by Elliott Bros. Pictures of the compass can be seen in the online compass museum COMPASSIPEDIA.

== Family ==
In 1865 he married Geraldine Mary Gostling and they went on to have four daughters.

Military offices
Preceded by Sir Edward Hutton	General Officer Commanding the Militia of Canada; 1900–1902	Succeeded by The Earl of Dundonald
