= Charles Hastings Doyle =

British Army general (1803–1883)

General The Honourable Sir Charles Hastings Doyle KCMG
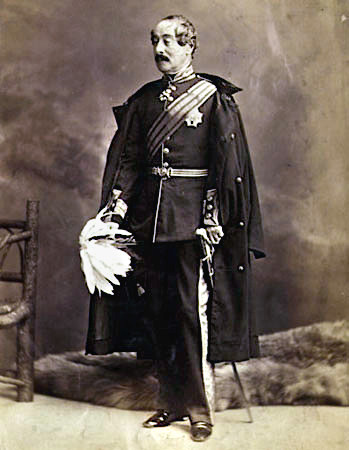

Colonial Lieutenant Governor of Nova Scotia
- In office 17 September 1863 – 8 November 1865
- Monarch: Victoria
- Premier: James W. Johnston; Charles Tupper
- Governor: The Viscount Monck
- Preceded by: George Phipps, 2nd Marquess of Normanby
- Succeeded by: Richard Graves MacDonnell

2nd Lieutenant Governor of Nova Scotia
- In office 18 October 1867 – 1 May 1873
- Monarch: Victoria
- Governors General: The Viscount Monck; The Lord Lisgar
- Premier: Hiram Blanchard; William Annand
- Preceded by: Sir William Williams, 1st Baronet, of Kars
- Succeeded by: Joseph Howe

1st Lieutenant Governor of New Brunswick
- In office 1 July 1867 – 18 October 1867
- Monarch: Victoria
- Governor General: The Viscount Monck
- Premier: Peter Mitchell; Andrew Rainsford Wetmore
- Preceded by: Arthur Hamilton-Gordon, 1st Baron Stanmore
- Succeeded by: Francis Pym Harding

Personal details
- Born: 10 April 1803 London, England
- Died: 19 March 1883 (aged 79) London, England

Sir Charles Hastings Doyle KCMG (10 April 1803 – 19 March 1883) was a British Army officer who was the second Lieutenant Governor of Nova Scotia post Confederation and the first Lieutenant Governor of New Brunswick.

== Military career ==
Born in London, England, the eldest son of Lieutenant-General Sir Charles William Doyle and Sophia Cramer Coghill, he attended the Royal Military College, Sandhurst, and joined the army as an ensign of the 24th (The 2nd Warwickshire) Regiment of Foot on 23 December 1819. He was promoted to the ranks of lieutenant on 27 September 1822 and captain on 16 June 1825. He received a brevet as major on 28 June 1838. Rising through the ranks (Lieutenant Colonel in 1846,), he reached major-general in 1860. He was Colonel of the 70th (Surrey) Regiment of Foot from 1868 to 1870.

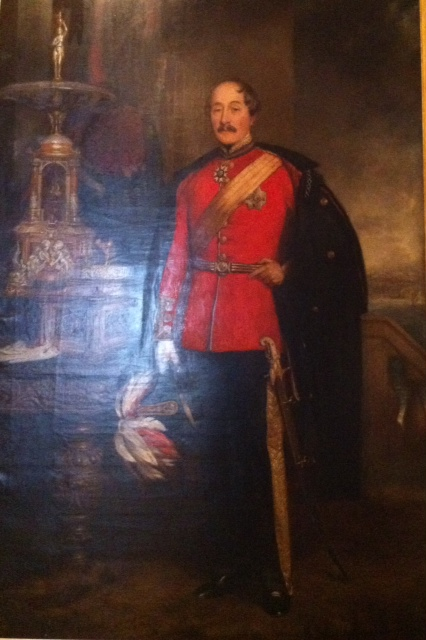
Charles Hastings Doyle by Adolphus Robert Venables, Province House (Nova Scotia), Canada

After service in the Crimean War, he was stationed in Nova Scotia and, during the American Civil War, resolved the Chesapeake Affair, which took place in Halifax. He then countered the threat of the Fenian Raid on Canada's Maritime Provinces by ending the Campobello Island Raid. By April 1866 the menace of a Fenian invasion of New Brunswick was at its most serious, and Doyle quickly responded to Lieutenant Governor Gordon's request for military aid. On 17 April 1866, he left Halifax with Royal Navy warships carrying over 700 British regulars and proceeded to Passamaquoddy Bay, where the Fenian force was concentrated, under the command of John O'Mahony. This show of British armed might discouraged the Fenians, and the invaders dispersed.

He was appointed the Lieutenant-Governor of New Brunswick in 1867, the first Lieutenant Governor of New Brunswick after Confederation. From 1867 to 1873, he was the second Lieutenant Governor of Nova Scotia post-Confederation. In 1869 he was appointed a Knight Commander of St Michael and St George, and in 1870 he was promoted to lieutenant-general. He became Commander of the British Troops in Canada in 1870 and general officer commanding Southern District in April 1874. He was promoted full general in 1877.

There is a full-length portrait of him by Adolphus Robert Venables in Province House (Nova Scotia). He is the namesake of Port Hastings, Nova Scotia.

== See also ==
- Military history of Nova Scotia
- Battle of Southsea

== Sources ==
- Hart, H.G. 1841. The New Army List. London.
- Paton, G. 1892. Historical Records of the 24th Regiment. London.

Military offices
Preceded by Sir Charles Windham	Commander of the British Troops in Canada; February 1870 – March 1870 (acting)	Succeeded by Sir James Lindsay
Preceded by Sir James Lindsay	Commander of the British Troops in Canada; 1870–1873	Succeeded by Sir William Haly
Preceded by Viscount Templetown	GOC Southern District; 1874–1877	Succeeded by Sir John Garvock
Preceded by Thomas Henry Johnston	Colonel of the 87th (Royal Irish; Fusiliers) Regiment of Foot; 1870–1881	Succeeded by Amalgamation to form Princess Victoria's (Royal Irish Fusiliers)
Preceded by George William Paty	Colonel of the 70th (Surrey) Regiment of Foot; 1868–1870	Succeeded by Henry Knight Storks
