= Thomas Henry Johnston (British Army officer) =

British Army officer

General Thomas Henry Johnston
- Died: 1891
- Military career
- Allegiance: United Kingdom
- Branch: British Army
- Rank: General
- Commands: 66th Regiment of Foot
- Conflicts: Lower Canada Rebellion

Thomas Henry Johnston (died 1891) was a general in the British Army.

== Military career ==
Johnston was commissioned as an ensign in the 66th Regiment of Foot on 21 February 1822. He was promoted to lieutenant on 1 October 1826, to captain on 24 October 1826 and to major on 20 May 1836. Promoted to lieutenant-colonel on 28 December 1838, he commanded his regiment during the Lower Canada Rebellion.

He was the colonel of the 87th (Royal Irish Fusiliers) Regiment of Foot from 1864 to 1870. He then transferred to be colonel of the 66th (Berkshire) Regiment of Foot from 1870 until it was amalgamated with the 49th Foot to form the Princess Charlotte of Wales's (Berkshire Regiment) in 1881, after which he was colonel of the 2nd Battalion of the new regiment until his death in 1891.

Military offices
Preceded by Edward Wells Bell	Colonel of the 66th (Berkshire) Regiment of Foot; 1870–1881	Succeeded by Amalgamation to form Princess Charlotte of Wales's (Berkshire Regiment)
Preceded by Lord William Paulet	Colonel of the 87th (Royal Irish; Fusiliers) Regiment of Foot; 1864–1870	Succeeded by Sir Charles Hastings Doyle
