= James Simpson (British Army officer) =

British army officer (1792–1868)

General Sir James Simpson GCB
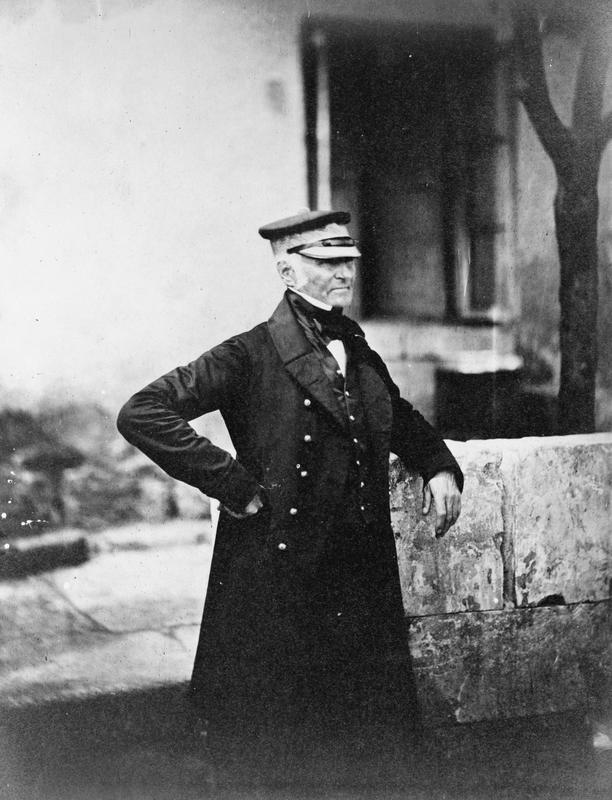
- Born: 12 February 1792; Edinburgh, Midlothian
- Died: 18 April 1868 (aged 76); Horringer, Suffolk
- Burial place: Horringer, Suffolk
- Military career
- Allegiance: United Kingdom
- Branch: British Army
- Service years: 1811–1855
- Rank: General
- Commands: British Troops in the Crimea; South-West District; 29th (Worcestershire) Regiment of Foot
- Conflicts: Napoleonic Wars; Peninsular War; Waterloo campaign; Crimean War
- Awards: Knight Grand Cross of the Order of the Bath; Grand Cross of the Legion of Honour (France); Knight Grand Cross of the Military Order of Savoy (Sardinia); Order of the Medjidie, First Class (Ottoman Empire)

General Sir James Simpson GCB (12 February 1792 – 18 April 1868) was a British Army officer of the 19th century. He commanded the British troops in the Crimea from June to November 1855, following the death of Field Marshal Lord Raglan. Simpson's competence in leading troops during the Crimean conflict was criticized by his contemporaries.

== Military career ==
Educated at the University of Edinburgh, Simpson was commissioned into the 1st Regiment of Foot Guards on 3 April 1811. He served with his regiment during the Peninsular War and the Waterloo Campaign, and then commanded the 29th Regiment of Foot in Mauritius and Bengal.

In 1839 Simpson married Elizabeth, daughter of Sir Robert Dundas, 1st Baronet of Beechwood. She died in 1840. Promoted to major general on 11 November 1851, he became General Officer Commanding the South-West District that same month.

In February 1855 he was sent out to the Crimea to act as chief of staff to the army commander Lord Raglan. Raglan died on 28 June, and Simpson reluctantly took command of the army, as the senior division commander Sir George Brown had been invalided home the same day as Raglan's death. He resigned on 10 November, and was succeeded by Sir William Codrington.

Historians Karl Marx and Friedrich Engels used the phrase "lions led by donkeys" on 27 September 1855, in an article published in Neue Oder-Zeitung, No. 457 (1 October 1855), on the British military's strategic mistakes and failings during the fall of Sevastopol, and particularly Simpson's military leadership of the assault on the Great Redan:

The joke making the rounds of the Russian army, that "L'armée anglaise est une armée de lions, commandée par des ânes" (The English army is an army of lions led by asses) has been thoroughly vindicated by the assault on Redan.

Military offices
Preceded by Sir George D'Aguilar	GOC South-West District; 1852–1855	Succeeded by Henry Breton
Preceded by Sir Ulysses Burgh, 2nd Baron Downes	Colonel of the 29th (Worcestershire) Regiment of Foot; 1863–1868	Succeeded by John Longfield
Preceded by Sir Hugh Gough, 1st Viscount Gough	Colonel of the 87th (Royal Irish; Fusiliers) Regiment of Foot; 1855–1863	Succeeded by Lord William Paulet
