= William O'Grady Haly =

British Army general

General Sir William O’Grady Haly KCB
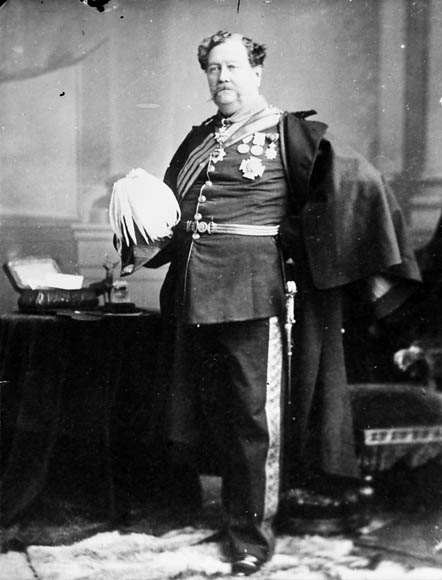
- Born: 2 January 1811; Middlesex
- Died: 19 March 1878 (aged 67); Halifax, Nova Scotia
- Military career
- Allegiance: United Kingdom
- Branch: British Army
- Service years: 1823–1878
- Rank: General
- Conflicts: Crimean War
- Awards: Knight Commander of the Order of the Bath

General Sir William O'Grady Haly KCB (2 January 1811 – 19 March 1878) was a British Army officer who was the Commander of the British Troops in Canada.

== Early life and family ==
Haly was one of five surviving children born to Richard Aylmer Haly of Wadhurst Castle, Sussex and his wife, Amelia Banister. The family lived largely on his mother's annual stipend from her father, Richard Banister.

== Military career ==
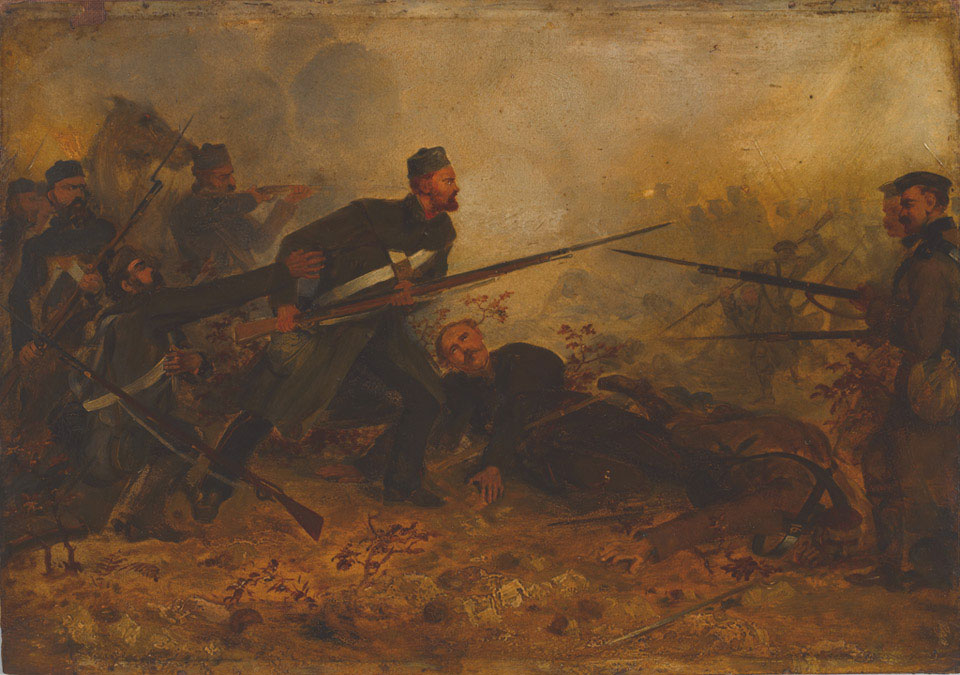
Haly being saved by John McDermond, by Louis William Desanges

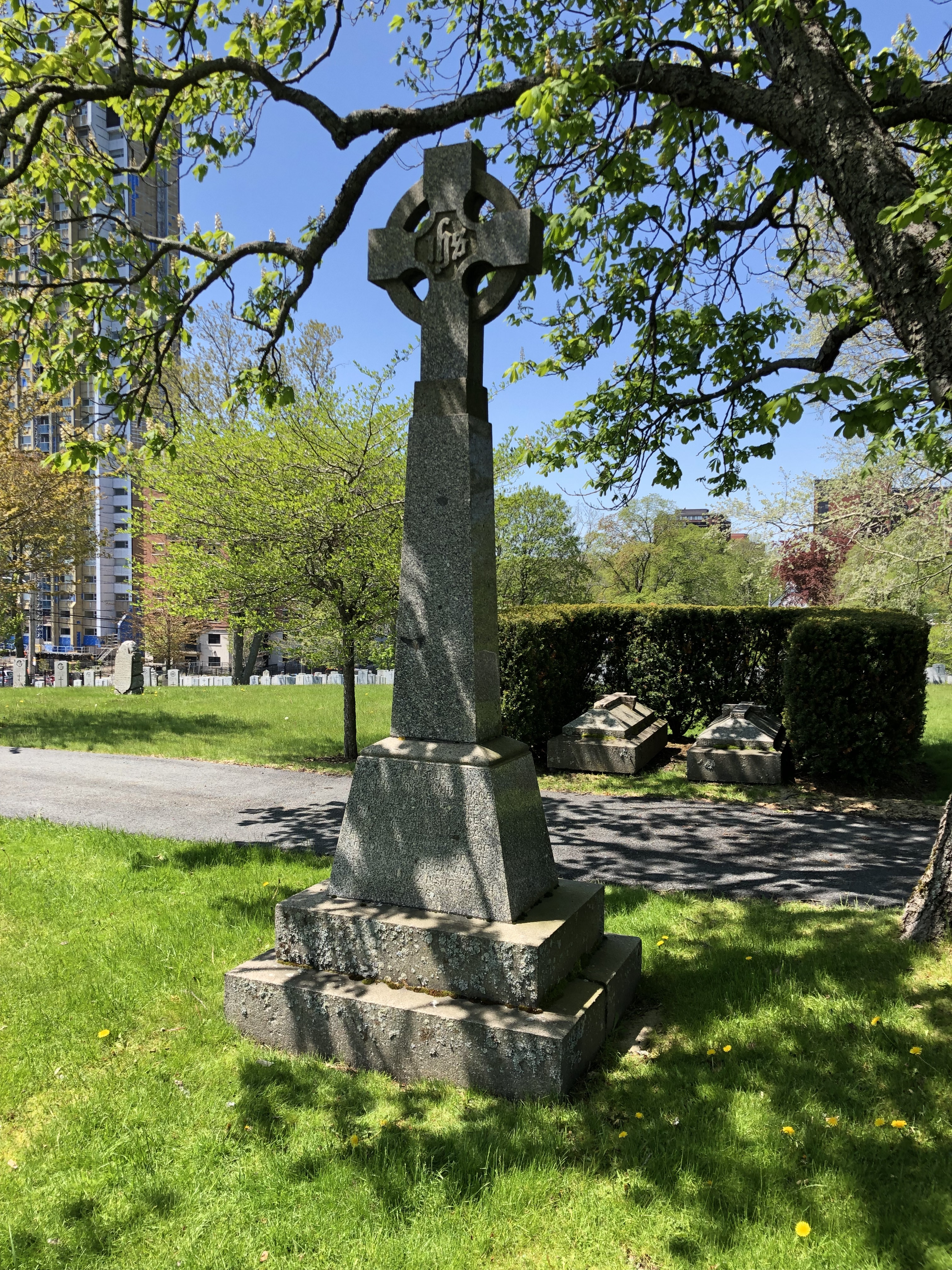
Sir William O'Grady Haly, Fort Massey Cemetery, Halifax, Nova Scotia

Haly was commissioned as an ensign in the 4th Regiment of Foot on 17 June 1828.

In 1831, Haly became a Lieut. in the 47th Regiment and made Captain by 1834.

In the Crimean War, Haly was wounded in the Battle of Inkerman (1854) and was rescued by Brevet Major Hugh Rowlands and John McDermond, both of whom received the Victoria Cross for their actions. Haly received the Order of the Medjidie.

After fighting in the Crimean War, he became Commander of the British Troops in Canada in 1873. He was given the colonelcy of the 47th (Lancashire) Regiment of Foot from 1875 to his death. and promoted General on 1 October 1877.

He died in office from gout on 19 March 1878. He is buried in the Fort Massey Cemetery.

== Family ==
In November 1839 Haly married Harriett Hebden: their eldest son was Major General Richard Hebden O'Grady Haly.

Military offices
Preceded by Sir Charles Doyle	Commander of the British Troops in Canada; 1873–1878	Succeeded by Sir Patrick MacDougall
Preceded by John Patton	Colonel of the 47th (Lancashire) Regiment of Foot; 1875–1878	Succeeded by Sir William Sherbrooke Ramsay Norcott
