= Fort Massey Cemetery =

Historic cemetery in Halifax, Nova Scotia, Canada

Coordinates: 44.63955°N 63.57476°W

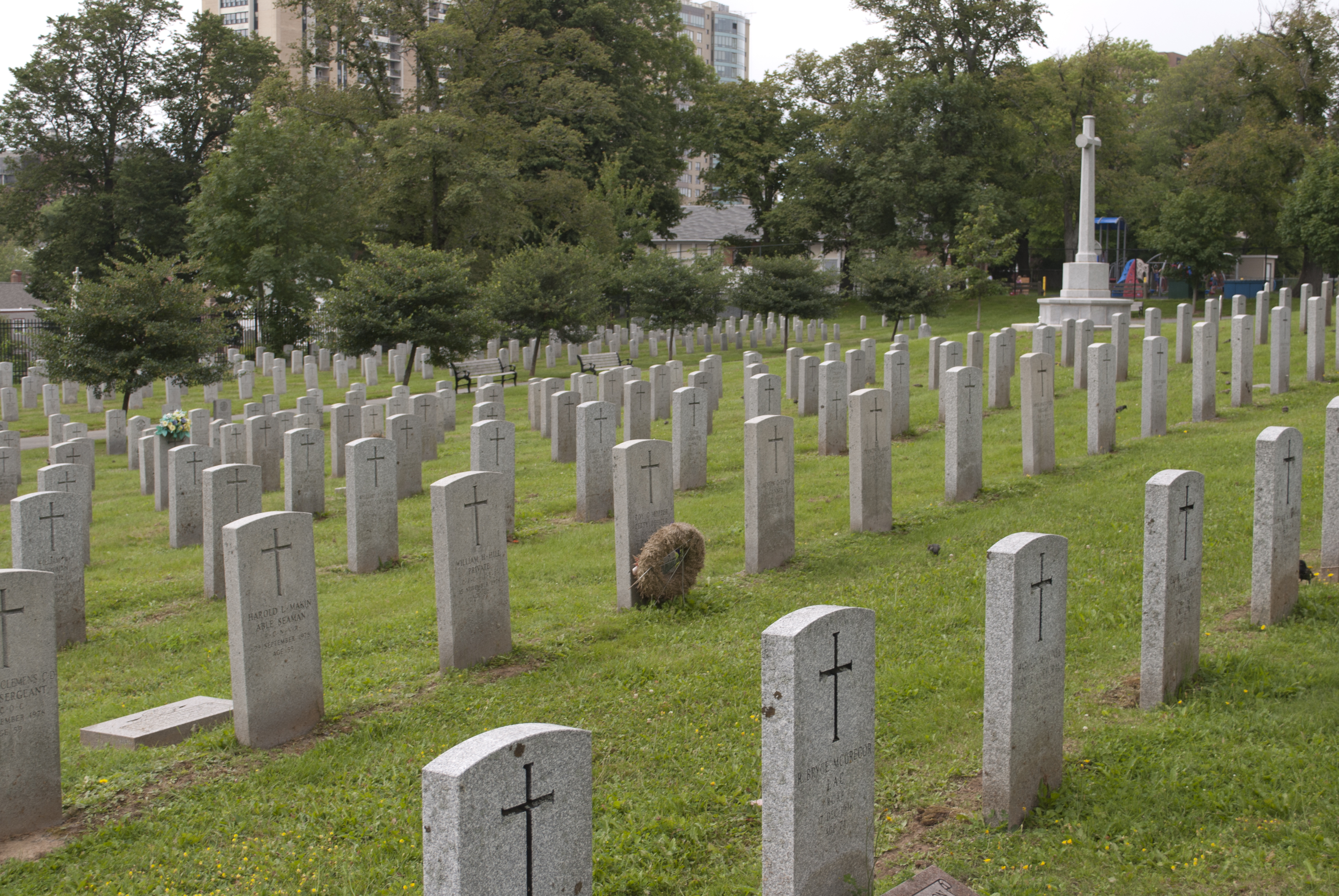
Fort Massey Cemetery

Fort Massey Cemetery is a military cemetery in Halifax, Nova Scotia dating back to the 1750s, and is the resting place for British and Canadian soldiers, veterans and spouses. The cemetery is named after Major General Eyre Massey. The cemetery is maintained by Veteran's Affairs Canada.

== Notable interments ==
It contains 86 Commonwealth burials of the First World War and 41 from the Second World War. Most of these graves are in a plot at the lower end of the cemetery, next to which stands the Cross of Sacrifice. The HALIFAX (FORT MASSEY) MEMORIAL stands within the cemetery and commemorates two servicemen who were killed in the 1917 explosion but whose bodies were not found.

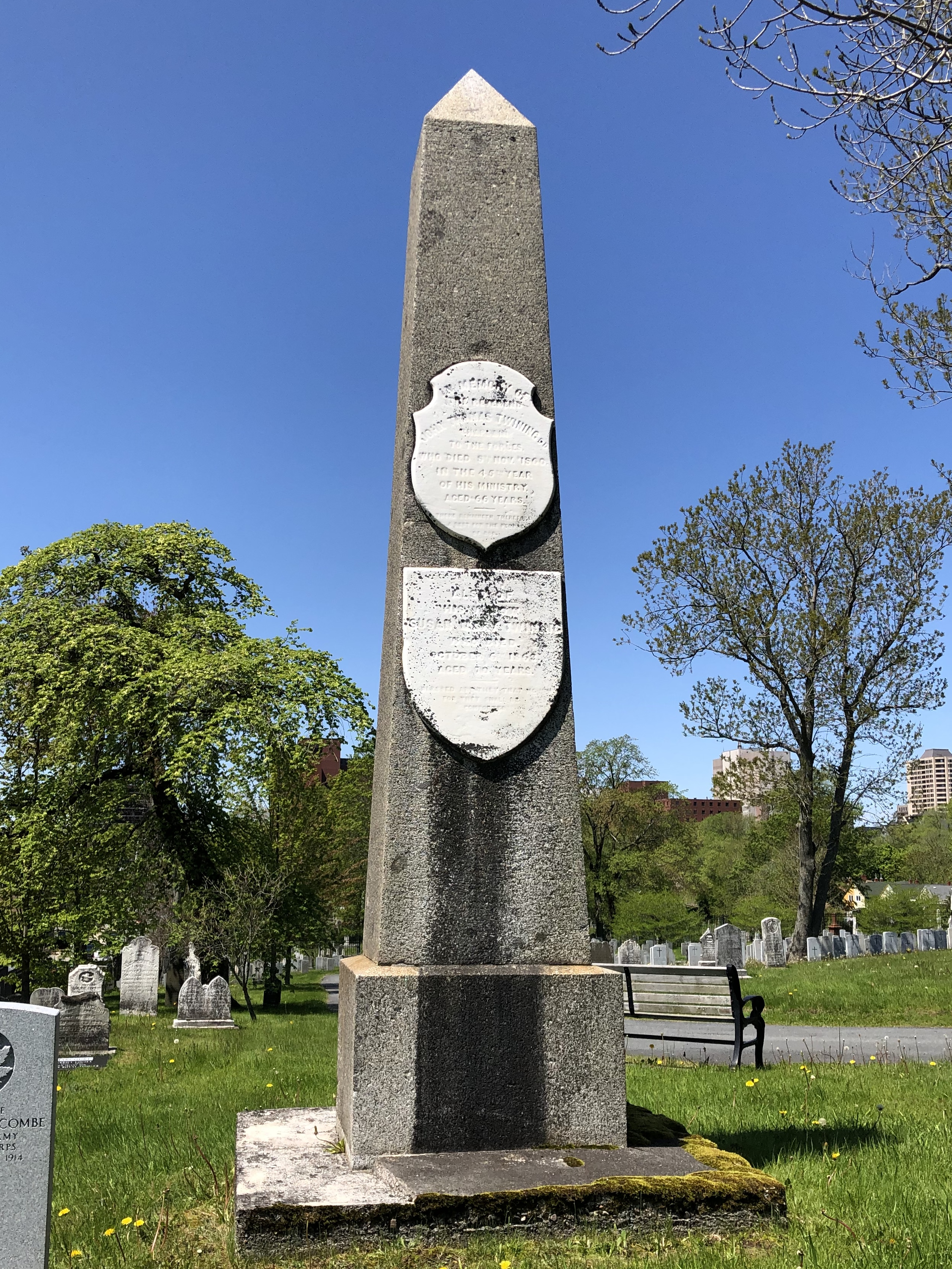
John Thomas Twining (d.1860)

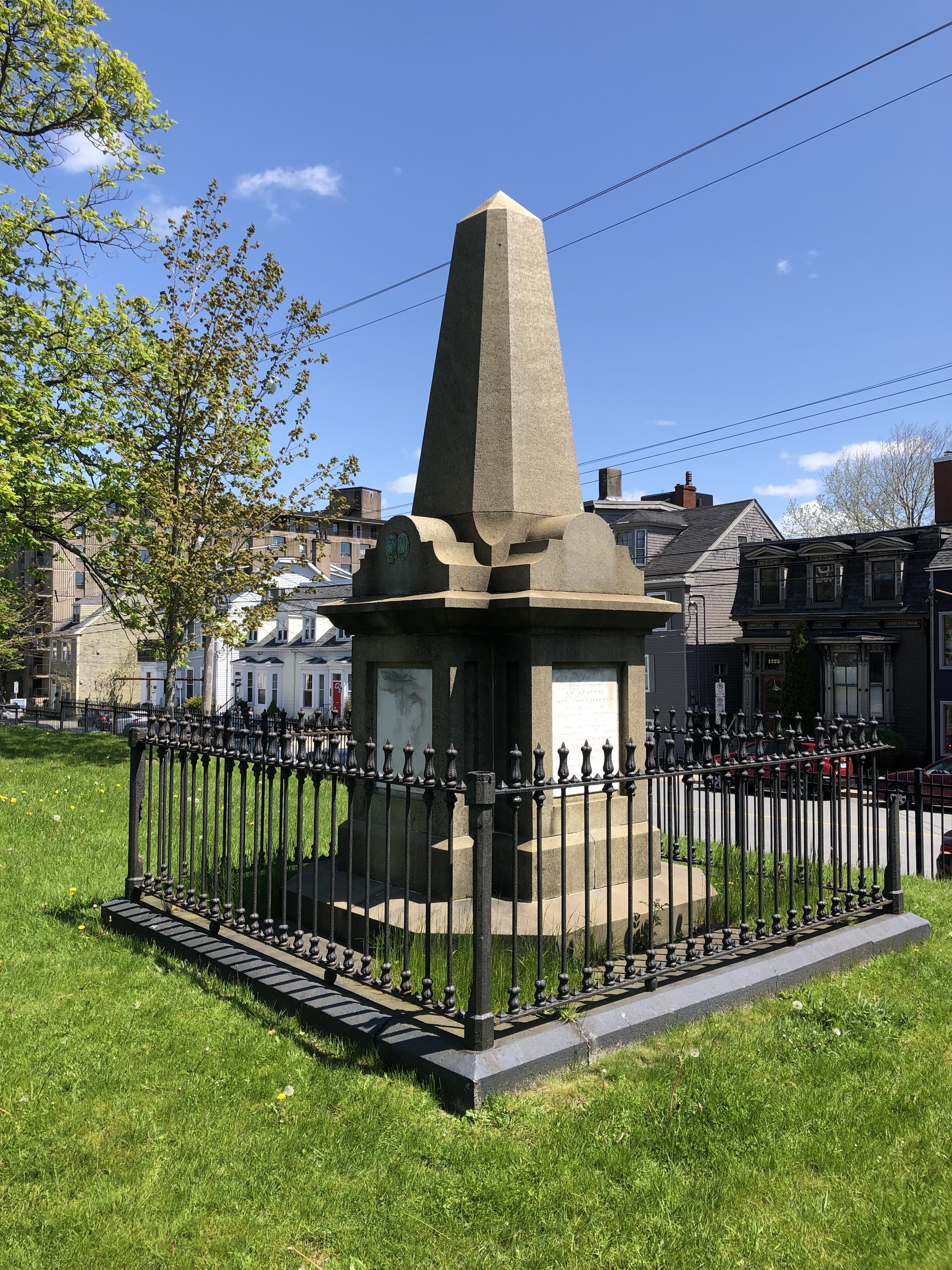
Sir John Harvey (d.1852)

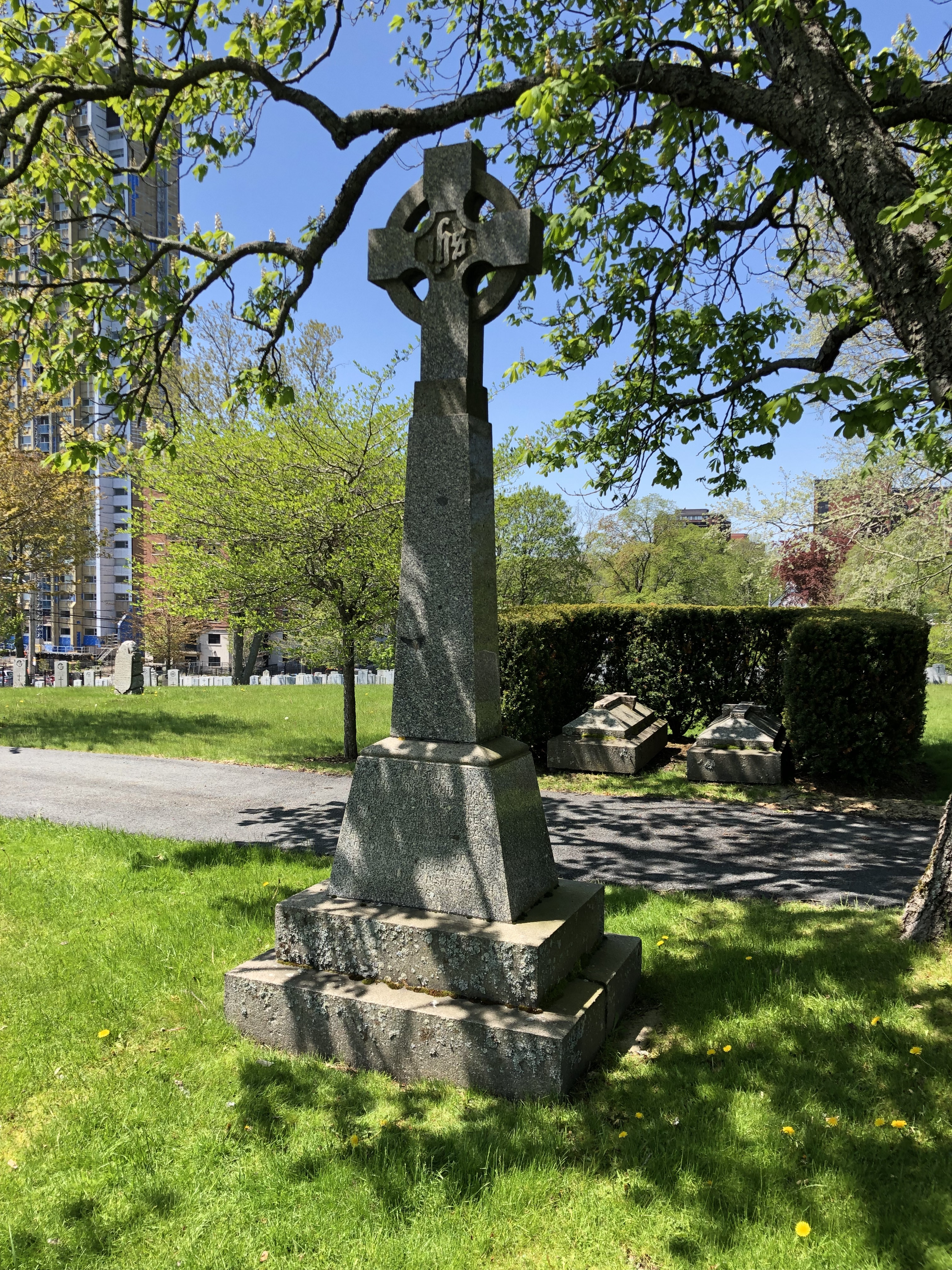
Sir William O'Grady Haly (d.1878)

Canadian Infantry (Nova Scotia Regiment):

- John Neal Private March 8, 1915
- Allan Mclean Private March 18, 1915
- Willis Henshaw Private April 18, 1915
- Alexander Duncan Sergeant March 23, 1918
- William Mills Private October 31, 1918
- Roderick Mcnutt Corporal January 15, 1920

Halifax Explosion

- Alexander Thompson Fyfe
