= Charles Norcott =

Charles Norcott CMG
- Born: 25 April 1849; Canada East
- Died: 20 January 1931 (aged 81)
- Military career
- Allegiance: United Kingdom
- Branch: British Army
- Rank: Colonel
- Unit: Rifle Brigade
- Commands: 4th Infantry Brigade
- Conflicts: Second Boer War
- Awards: Companion of the Order of St Michael and St George

Colonel Charles Hawtrey Bruce Norcott, CMG (1849–1931) of the Rifle Brigade was a third generation officer of the Rifle Brigade who served between 1867 and 1901. During the Second Boer War he took part in the relief of Ladysmith, later being given command of the 4th Infantry Brigade of the Natal Field Force.

== Early life ==
Norcott was born in Canada East on 25 April 1849, the second son of Lieutenant General William Sherbrooke Ramsay Norcott and grandson of Major General Amos Godsell Robert Norcott.

== Military career ==
Charles Norcott purchased his commission as an Ensign to the Rifle Brigade on 14 August 1867 and was promoted to lieutenant on 1 November 1871, acting as an Adjutant between 14 June 1873 to 11 September 1875. He was promoted to captain on 1 April 1879 and major on 1 January 1884. From 29 November 1884 he served as an Aide-de-camp to Major General Dillon, a divisional commander of the Bengal Army.

He was made lieutenant colonel on 16 December 1895. and Brevetted Colonel on 16 December 1899

During the Second Boer War he sailed with his regiment in command of the 1st Battalion, Rifle Brigade during the Relief of Ladysmith, and in February 1900 temporarily took over command of the 4th Brigade, Natal Field Force, while General Neville Lyttelton was promoted to divisional command.

He was put on half pay on 7 March 1900, and retired from the army 2 November 1901.

Norcott was Deputy Lieutenant of the County of Rutland from 6 September 1916 to 10 August 1921.

He died on 20 January 1931.

== Family ==
Norcott married Mary Emily Kinahan on the 14 July 1892 and they had six children. Charles' father William Norcott was also a general in the Rifles who served during the Crimean War. His grandfather Amos Norcott commanded the 2nd Battalion, Rifle Brigade at Waterloo. He also had an uncle named Charles Rossmore Robert Norcott who gained renown for his service as a superintendent of the Western Australia Police.

== Notes ==
=== Sources ===
- Schneider, John (28 April 2012a), The Anglo-Allied Army (Anglo-Allied Order of Battle for the campaign), Napoleonic Literature, archived from the original on 17 July 2012
