= John McDermond =

Recipient of the Victoria Cross

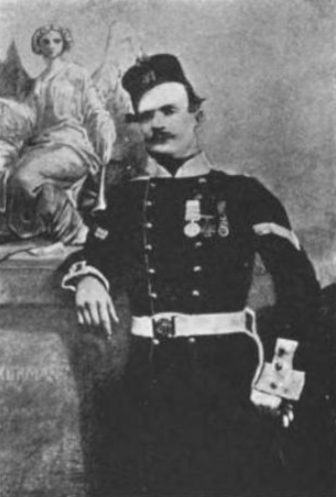
- Born: 1832; Glasgow, Scotland
- Died: 22 July 1868 (aged 35–36); Glasgow, Scotland
- Burial place: Woodside Cemetery, Paisley
- Military career
- Allegiance: United Kingdom
- Branch: British Army
- Rank: Corporal
- Units: 47th (the Lancashire) Regiment of Foot
- Conflicts: Crimean War
- Awards: Victoria Cross; Médaille militaire (France)

John McDermond VC (1832 – 22 July 1868) was a Scottish recipient of the Victoria Cross, the highest and most prestigious award for gallantry in the face of the enemy that can be awarded to British and Commonwealth forces.

== Details ==
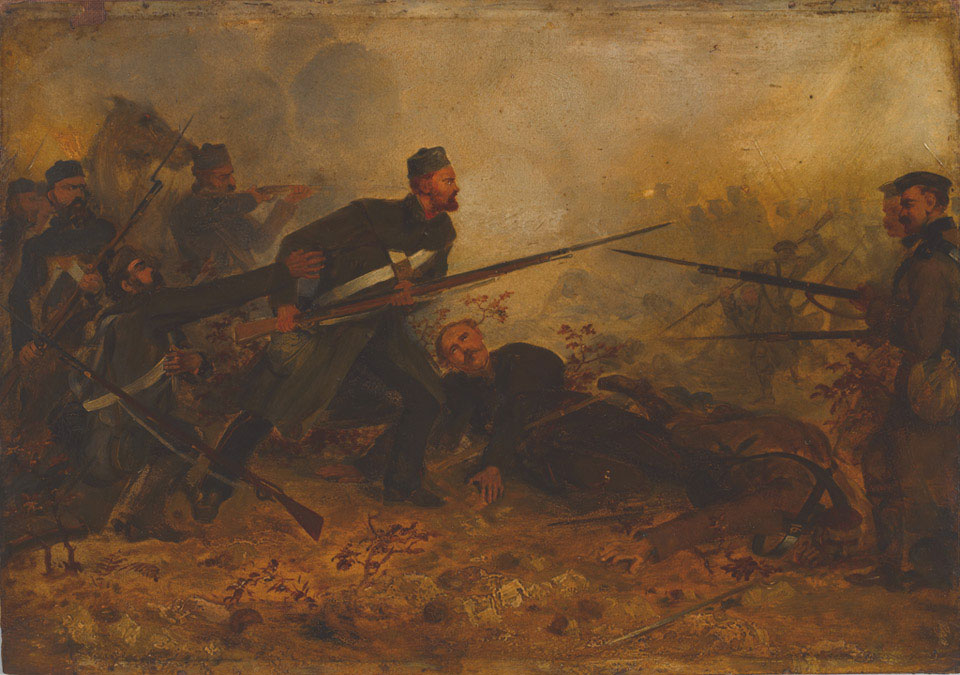
John McDermond Saving Colonel Haly by Louis William Desanges

McDermond was approximately 22 years old, and a private in the 47th (the Lancashire) Regiment of Foot, British Army during the Crimean War when the following deed took place for which he was awarded the VC.

On 5 November 1854 at the Battle of Inkerman, Crimea, Private McDermond and Captain Hugh Rowlands saved the life of a Colonel William O'Grady Haly who was lying wounded on the ground surrounded by the enemy. Private McDermond rushed to the rescue and killed the man who had wounded the colonel.

There is a painting depicting this event hung in the Queen's Lancashire Regiment Museum at Fulwood Barracks, Preston. According to his service record John McDermond was from Clackmannan and was discharged due to injury. He died 22 July 1868 Glasgow, Scotland of typhus. Although only 36 his profession was marked down as "pensioner".

It is generally believed that he is buried in Paisley but this may be because a person with the same name died at the poor house there in 1868.

== The medal ==
Of the 16 V.C.'s awarded for actions during the Battle of Inkerman, two are unaccounted for – those won by John McDermond and John Byrne of the 68th Durham Light Infantry, the other 14 being in private collections or museums.

It is thought a Victoria Cross medal (missing the suspender bar and ribbon) found by Tobias Neto in the mud of the river Thames in December 2015 could be that of John McDermond or John Byrne - the medal having the date of 5 November 1854 engraved on the reverse.
