= Edward Wells Bell =

British Army general

General Edward Wells Bell
- Born: c. 1789; Birmingham, UK
- Died: 9 October 1870; Kempsey, Worcestershire, UK
- Burial place: Kempsey, Worcestershire, UK
- Military career
- Allegiance: United Kingdom
- Branch: British Army
- Rank: General
- Commands: 7th Regiment of Foot
- Conflicts: Peninsular War; War of 1812
- Other work: Lieutenant-Governor of Jamaica; Colonel of the 66th Foot

General Edward Wells Bell (c. 1789 – 9 October 1870) was a senior British Army officer and Lieutenant-Governor of Jamaica.

He joined the British army as an ensign and was promoted lieutenant in 1811, captain in 1822, major in 1826, lieutenant-colonel in 1830, colonel in 1846, lieutenant-general in 1860 and full general in 1868.

He served with the 7th Regiment of Foot during the Peninsular War and took part in the Battles of Vittoria, Salamanca, Nivelle and Nive, amongst others.

He then fought in North America in 1814–15, where he was present at the Battle of New Orleans before moving to command the troops in Jamaica, where he was appointed Lieutenant Governor in 1856 (until 1857).

In 1859 he was given the Colonelcy of the 66th (Berkshire) Regiment of Foot, which he held until his death in 1870.

He married Mary Anne Chapman, widow of Captain Henry Robert Battersby RN (married 10 May 1816 and died 28 Nov 1816), daughter of William Chapman and Isabella Nevin, and niece of Sir Benjamin Chapman (1st Baronet) and Sir Thomas Chapman Kt (2nd Baronet) of Killua Castle, County Westmeath. Their son Major-General Edward William Derrington Bell won the VC during the Crimean War.

Government offices
Preceded by Sir Henry Barkly	Lieutenant-Governor of Jamaica; 1856 – 1857	Succeeded by Charles Henry Darling
Military offices
Preceded by Richard Blunt	Colonel of the 66th (Berkshire) Regiment of Foot; 1859–1870	Succeeded by Thomas Henry Johnston
