= Commander of the British Troops in Canada =

Commander of the British Army in Canada

This is a list of officers who commanded the Regular Troops of the British Army in Canada until 1906, when the last British garrison was withdrawn.

From 1875 there was a separate commander of the Canadian Militia. This officer was responsible to the government of Canada and was the predecessor of the present Commander of the Canadian Army.

== Commanders ==
Lieutenant-General on the Staff, commanding the Troops in North America

- 1849–1855: Lieutenant-General William Rowan
- 1855–1856: Major-General John Home Home, acting
- 1856–1859: Lieutenant-General Sir William Eyre
- 1859–1865: Lieutenant-General Sir William Fenwick Williams 1st Baronet

Lieutenant-General on the Staff, commanding the Troops in Canada

- 1865–1867: Lieutenant-General Sir John Michel
- 1867–1870: Lieutenant-General Sir Charles Ash Windham
- February–March 1870: Major-General Sir Charles Hastings Doyle, acting
- March–September 1870: Lieutenant-General the Hon. James Alexander Lindsay, employed on a particular service to oversee the reduction of British troops
- 1870–1873: Lieutenant-General Sir Charles Hastings Doyle, resumed
- 1873–1878: General Sir William O'Grady Haly
- 1878–1883: General Sir Patrick Leonard MacDougall
- 1883–1888: General Lord Alexander George Russell
- 1888–1893: General Sir John Ross
- 1893–1898: General Alexander George Montgomery Moore
- 1898–1901: Lieutenant-General Lord William Frederick Ernest Seymour

Colonel on the Staff, commanding the Troops in Canada

- 1902–1906: Major-General Sir Charles Sim Bremridge Parsons
