= Patrick MacDougall (British Army officer) =

British Army general (1819–1894)

General Sir Patrick MacDougall KCMG
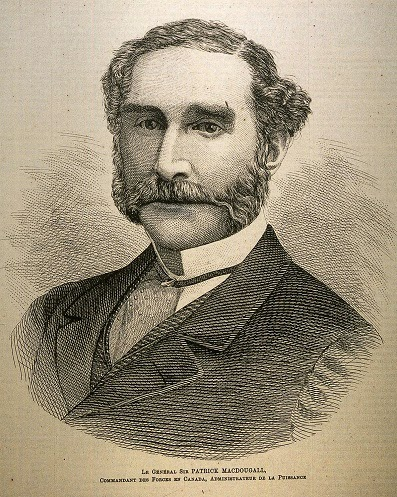
- Born: 10 August 1819; Boulogne-sur-Mer, France
- Died: 28 November 1894 (aged 75) Kingston Hill, London
- Allegiance: United Kingdom
- Branch: British Army
- Rank: General
- Commands: The British Troops in Canada
- Awards: Knight Commander of the Order of St Michael and St George
- Other work: Commandant, author

General Sir Patrick Leonard MacDougall, KCMG (10 August 1819 – 28 November 1894) was a British Army officer who became Commander of the British Troops in Canada.

== Military career ==
MacDougall was born the only son of Lieutenant Colonel Sir Duncan MacDougall (1787–1862) and Anne, daughter of Colonel Cornelius Smelt (1748–1832), Lieutenant Governor of the Isle of Man. Educated at a military academy in Edinburgh, then the Royal Military College, Sandhurst, he was commissioned as a second lieutenant in the 79th Regiment of Foot, (Cameron Highlanders) in 1836. He then served in the 36th (Herefordshire) Regiment of Foot and transferred to The Royal Canadian Rifle Regiment in 1844. He was promoted to major and became Superintendent of Studies at the Royal Military College, Sandhurst in March 1854 and then served in the Crimean War later that year. At its formation, he was appointed commandant of the Staff College. He became adjutant general of the Canadian militia in May 1865 and head of reserve forces in England in 1871. He became Commander of the British Troops in Canada in 1878. Three times, in 1878, 1881 to 1882, and 1882 to 1883, he was the administrator of the government of Canada in the absence of the Governor General of Canada. He retired as a General in July 1885.

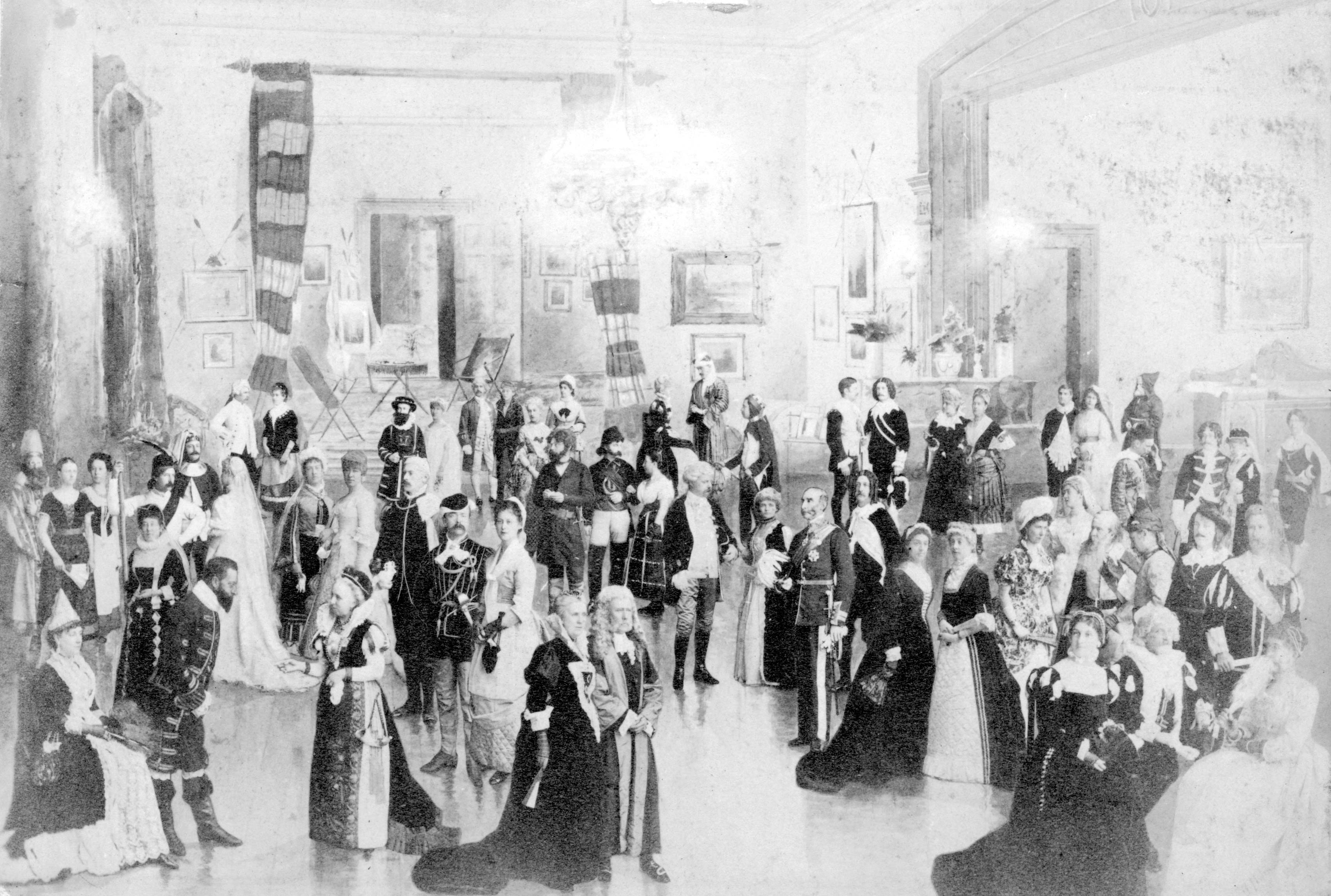
Fancy-dress Ball given by Gen. Sir Patrick L. MacDougall, KCMG, at Maplewood, Northwest Arm, Halifax, Nova Scotia, Canada

From 1888 to 1891 he was Colonel of the West India Regiment. In 1891 he was made Colonel of The Prince of Wales's Leinster Regiment (Royal Canadians), a position he held until his death.

He died in 1894 at Kingson Hill, London having lived with his second wife at 22 Elvaston Place, London and Melbury Lodge, Kingston Hill, Surrey and was buried at East Putney Cemetery.

He was the author of several military works: The Theory of War (1856), Campaigns of Hannibal (1858), Modern Warfare as influenced by Modern Artillery (1864), The army and its reserves (1869), and Modern infantry tactics (1873).

== Family ==
MacDougall married, firstly, Louisa Augusta Napier (third daughter of Sir William Francis Patrick Napier and Caroline Ameila Fox) on 15 July 1844 in Guernsey and following her death on 8 September 1856, he married Marianne Adelaide Miles (born 1834), eighth daughter of Philip John Miles and Clarissa Peach at St George's Hanover Square on 21 June 1860. Marianne was described as "a charming woman and a well-known amateur water-colour artist" by Lady Glover who stayed with them in Canada. There were no children by either marriage. His first wife's sister Pamela married Philip William Skinner Miles, a son of Philip John Miles.

== Awards ==
He was awarded the medal and clasp for Sebastopol and the Turkish medal. He was appointed a Knight Commander of the Order of St Michael and St George in 1877.

Military offices
Preceded by Sir William Haly	Commander of the British Troops in Canada; 1878–1883	Succeeded by Lord Alexander Russell
