= Wadhurst Castle =

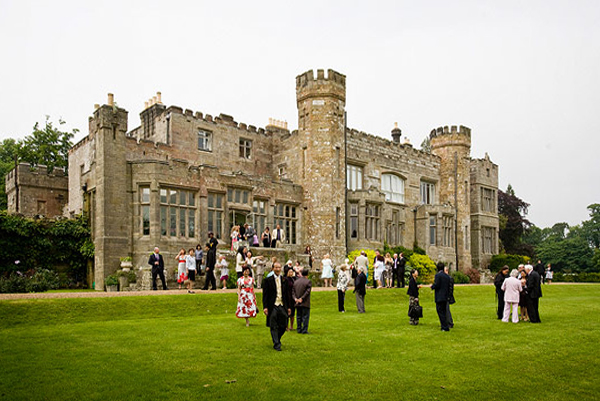
- A wedding at Wadhurst Castle in 2009

- Location within East Sussex
- 51°03′50″N 0°19′54″E
- Type: Castellated villa
- Location: Sparrows Green, Wadhurst
- OS grid reference: TQ 63486 31986

History
- Built: 1818–20; remodelled 1840s

Site notes
- Area: East Sussex
- Architect: Edward Buckton Lamb

Listed Building – Grade II
- Designated: 31 December 1982
- Reference no.: 1028052

National Register of Historic Parks and Gardens
- Designated: 20 September 1993
- Reference no.: 1001272

Wadhurst Castle is a 19th-century castellated mansion just to the west of the town of Wadhurst, East Sussex, England, in an elevated position overlooking the countryside to the south. It is a grade II listed building.

First built in 1818-20 by James Louis West, on the site of the farmhouse of Maplehurst, it was bought by Benjamin Harding in 1838, for whom it was remodelled to its present appearance by the architect Edward Buckton Lamb. The existing parkland was also developed at the same time, and the terraced gardens, and entrance lodge on the present B2099, were added. The castle was purchased by Edward Watson-Smyth in 1844, and he enlarged it to the north-east and also further extended the parkland. After the First World War, parts of the estate were sold off, the northern part being developed as housing, the present Castle Walk. The gardens are also Grade II listed. The castle is now a licensed venue for weddings.

== Early residents ==
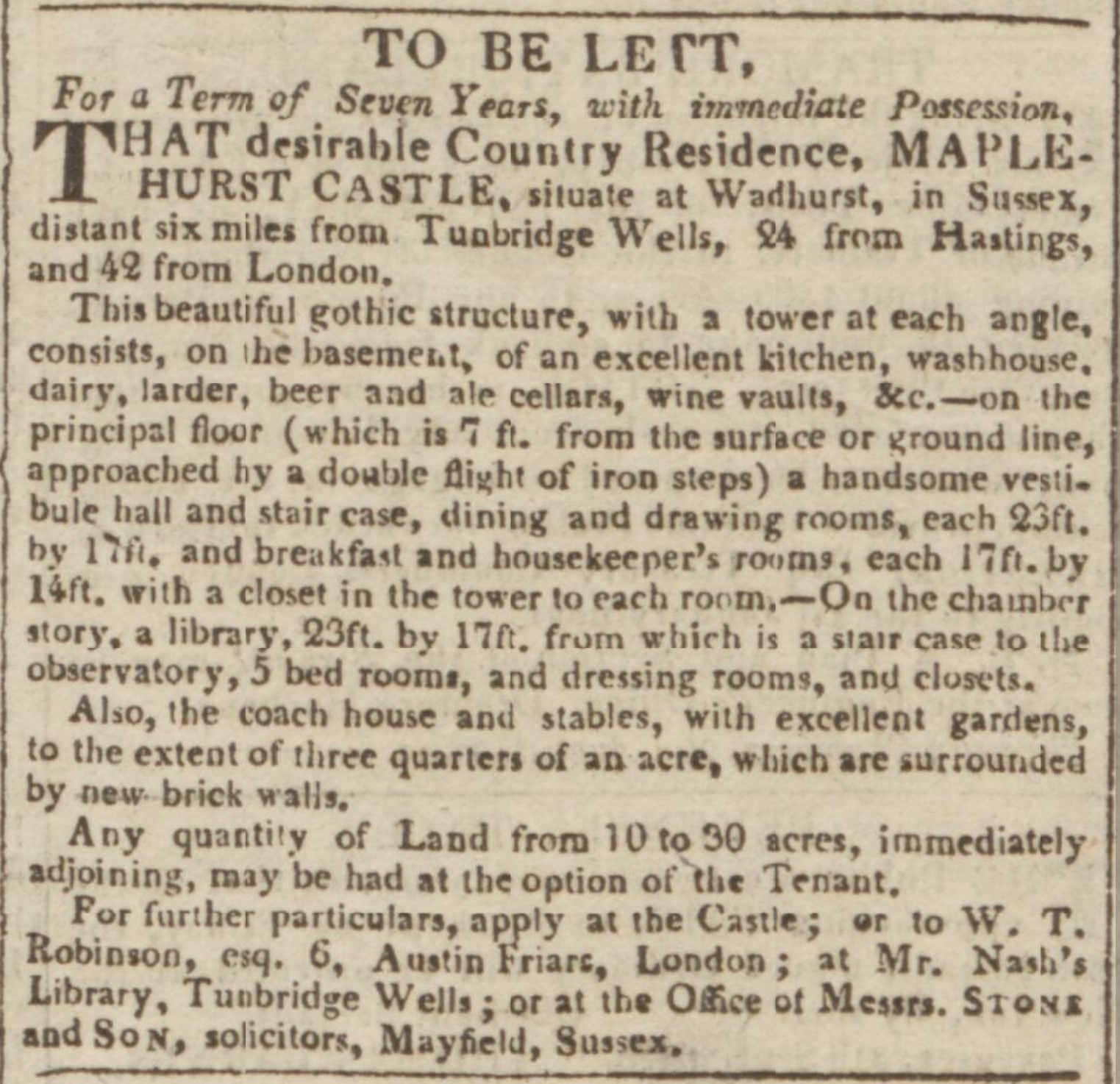
Rental notice for Wadhurst Castle (then called Maplehurst Castle) 1820

James Louis West (1761-1819) built Wadhurst Castle (then called Maplehurst) in about 1818. At this time he was living in Countisbury in Devon. His birth name was James Louis Lucadou but he changed it to West in 1816. His father was John Daniel Lucadou, a banker in London who founded one of the banks which in later years became NatWest.

In his youth James was an officer in the Bengal Army and lived in India for some time. He resigned in 1791 and joined his father in London as a partner in the Bank. He was elected as a Director of the French Hospital there in 1788. His father died in 1802 and he received a substantial inheritance. He did not marry and when he died he left his estate in trust to Henry Talbot until he came of age. In 1820 the trustees decided to rent the house and an advertisement was placed in the newspapers.

In 1826 Henry exchanged the property for a house in France with Aylmer Haly (full name Richard Aylmer Haly) (1772-1851). He was a captain in the 4th Kings Own Regiment. In 1803 he married Amelia Bannister who was the only daughter of Richard Bannister of Newington Place. The couple had five children one of whom William O'Grady Haly became a famous general. Aylmer extended the area around the property by buying nearby farms and also changed its name from Maplehurst to Wadhurst Castle. In about 1840 he sold it to Benjamin Harding.

Benjamin Harding (1800-1849) was a landowner and justice of the peace of Sussex. In 1840 he married Louisa Le Neve (born Thacker) who was the widow of George Le Neve. She was the personal friend of Maria Louise Ramé, a famous English novelist who came to visit her at Wadhurst Castle. Benjamin commissioned the famous architect Edward Buckton Lamb to remodel the Castle. The drawings were exhibited at the Royal Academy. The Winter Garden was added and the outside of the castle was embellished with further turrets, spires and window tracery. The existing parkland was also developed, and the terraced gardens and entrance lodge were added. Benjamin died in 1849 and the house was put on the market for sale. Edward Watson-Smyth bought the property. In 1846, he had married Mary Elizabeth Georgiana Watson Hay (1820-1900) and moved into the castle ith his bride. During his ownership he enlarged the castle to the north east and extended the parkland. The couple had no children so when Edward died in 1869 he left the property to his brother Robert Watson-Smyth.

== Later residents ==
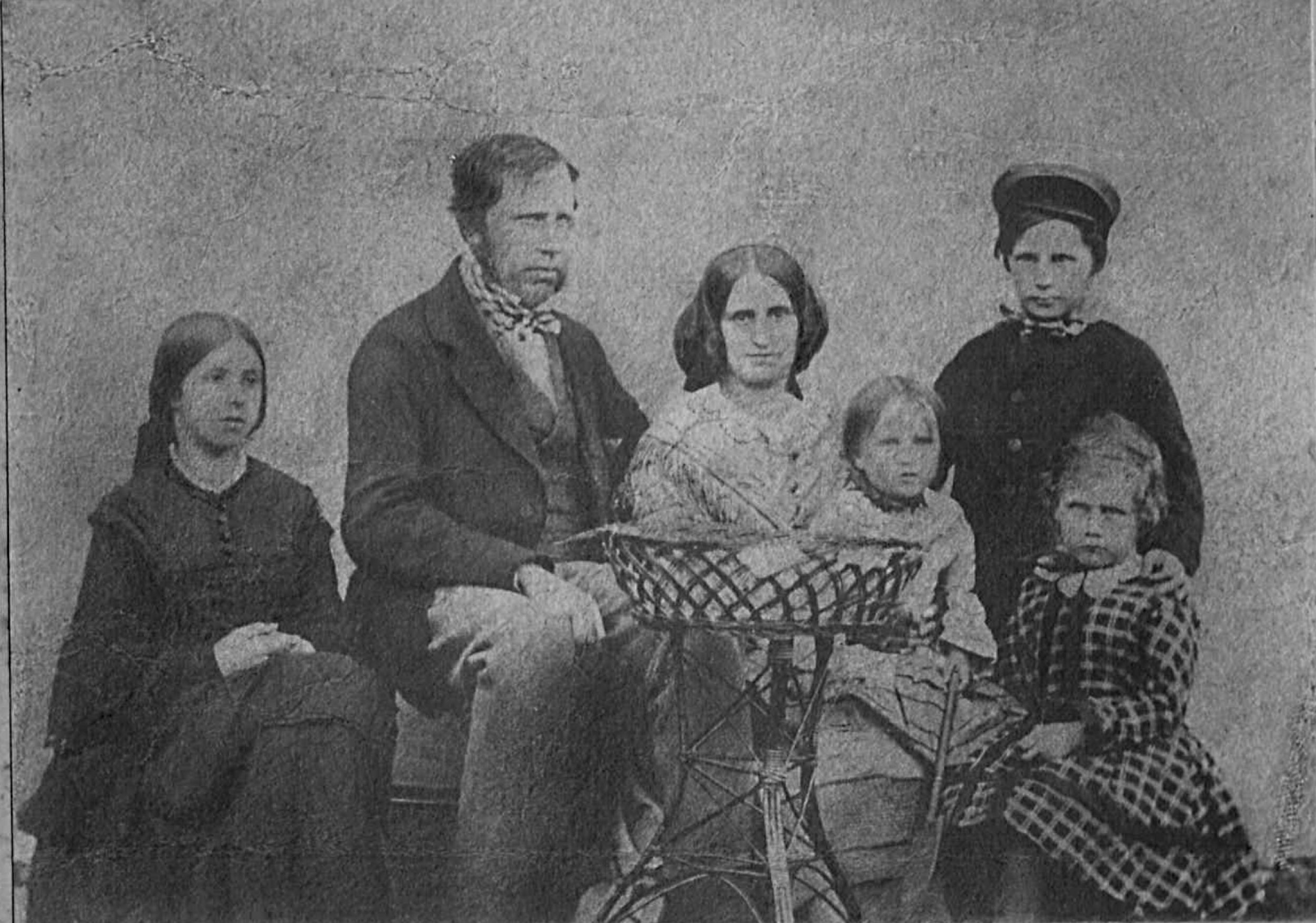
Robert and Louisa Watson Smyth and their family in 1860

Robert Watson-Smyth (1814-1884) was a wealthy landowner. In 1845 he married Louisa Maxfield and the couple had six children. The 1881 Census records them living at Wadhurst Castle with three of their daughters, a butler, a cook, a ladies maid and three domestic servants. When Robert died, in 1884, his son William Douglas Watson-Smyth inherited the property.

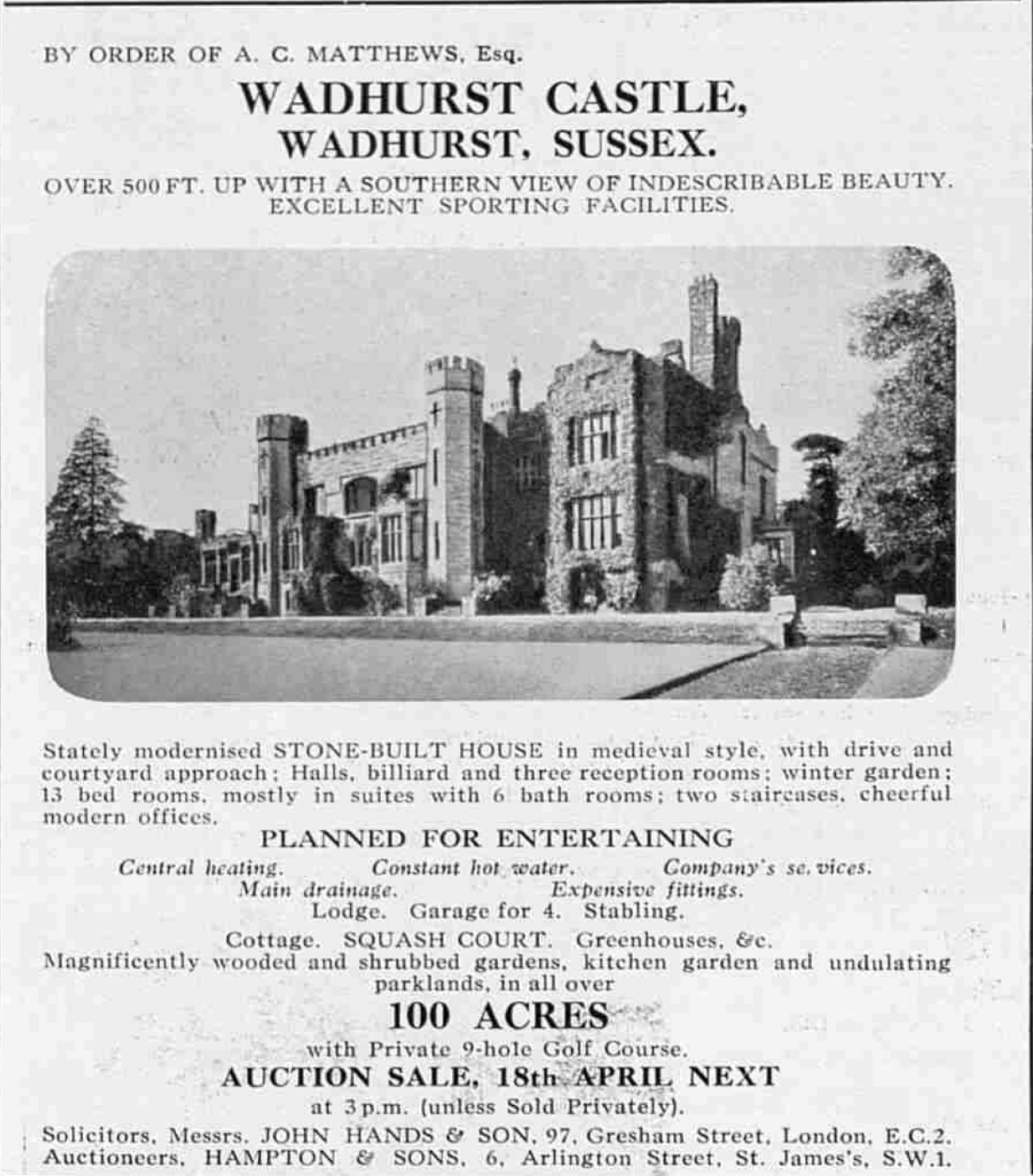
Sale notice for Wadhurst Castle in 1939.

William Douglas Watson-Smyth (1852-1918) was educated at Eton and Cambridge. He was a keen sportsman and travelled to many countries for big game hunting. In 1891 he married Ethel Renton who was the daughter of James Hall Renton. The couple had two sons but unfortunately she died in 1896. He married again in 1901. His new wife was Annora Margaret Williams-Wynn (1861-1954) and they had two daughters. When Willam died in 1918 the last Watson-Smyth owner inherited the house. He was George Robert Watson-Smyth.

George Robert Watson-Smyth (1892-1964) went to War at the age of 22. He was a captain in 13th Hussars. In 1915 he was badly wounded in France and lost his leg. In 1917 he married Madeleine Mary Pedder (1889-1972) and the couple had three children. They lived at Wadhurst Castle for some years and in about 1927 converted part of the castle to a country club that could be used as a club for the golf course on adjoining grounds. He sold the property in 1931 to Paul Geoffrey Bankart who continued operating the castle as a country club. Then in 1933 there was a serious fire at the house which damaged a substantial part of the building.

In the following year it was sold to Alfred Charles Matthews (1886-1945), an architect. He repaired the castle and lived there for some time with his wife Alice Esther (née Robbins). He advertised the house for sale in 1939. However he did not sell it and soon after it was requisitioned for war purposes. He had other properties in Australia and he returned there to live with his wife. He died in Tasmania in 1945. In 1947 the house was advertised for sale. In 1955 the Fitzgerald family purchased Wadhurst Castle and the estate is now in the joint ownership of the Fitzgerald and Clough families.

== Notable residents ==
- William O'Grady Haly
