= 87th (Royal Irish Fusiliers) Regiment of Foot =

Former British Army regiment

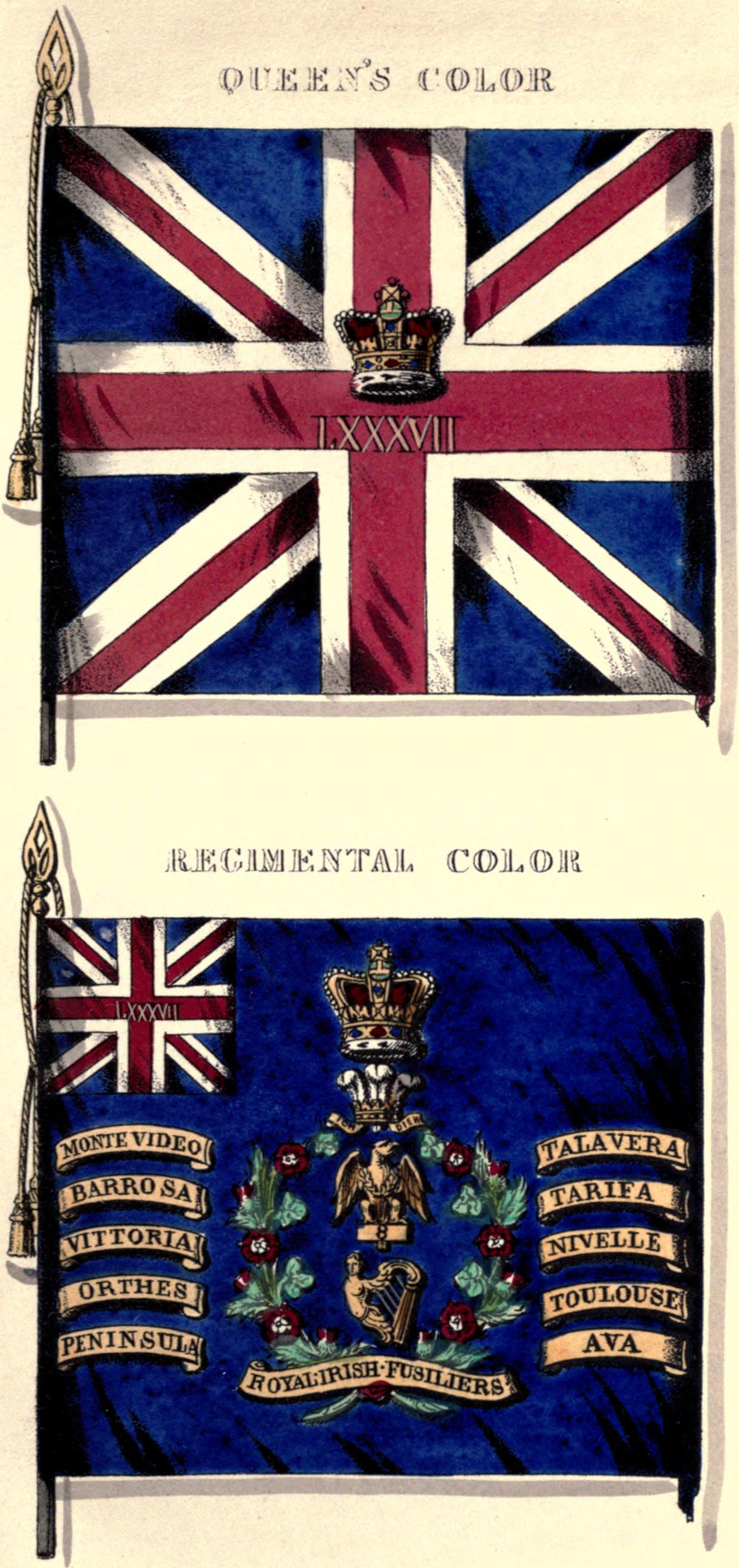
- 1853 illustration of the regimental colours
- Active: 1793–1881
- Country: Great Britain (1793–1800); United Kingdom (1801–1881)
- Branch: British Army
- Type: Infantry
- Role: Line infantry
- Size: One battalion (1793–1804; 1817–1881); Two battalions (1804–1817)
- Garrison/HQ: Renmore Barracks, Galway
- Nicknames: Blayney's Bloodhounds; The Faughs; The Aigle Catchers; The Aiglers
- Engagements: French Revolutionary Wars; Napoleonic Wars; First Anglo-Burmese War; Indian Rebellion

The 87th (Royal Irish Fusiliers) Regiment of Foot was an infantry regiment of the British Army, raised in 1793. Under the Childers Reforms it amalgamated with the 89th (Princess Victoria's) Regiment of Foot to form the Princess Victoria's (Royal Irish Fusiliers) in 1881.

== History ==
=== Formation ===
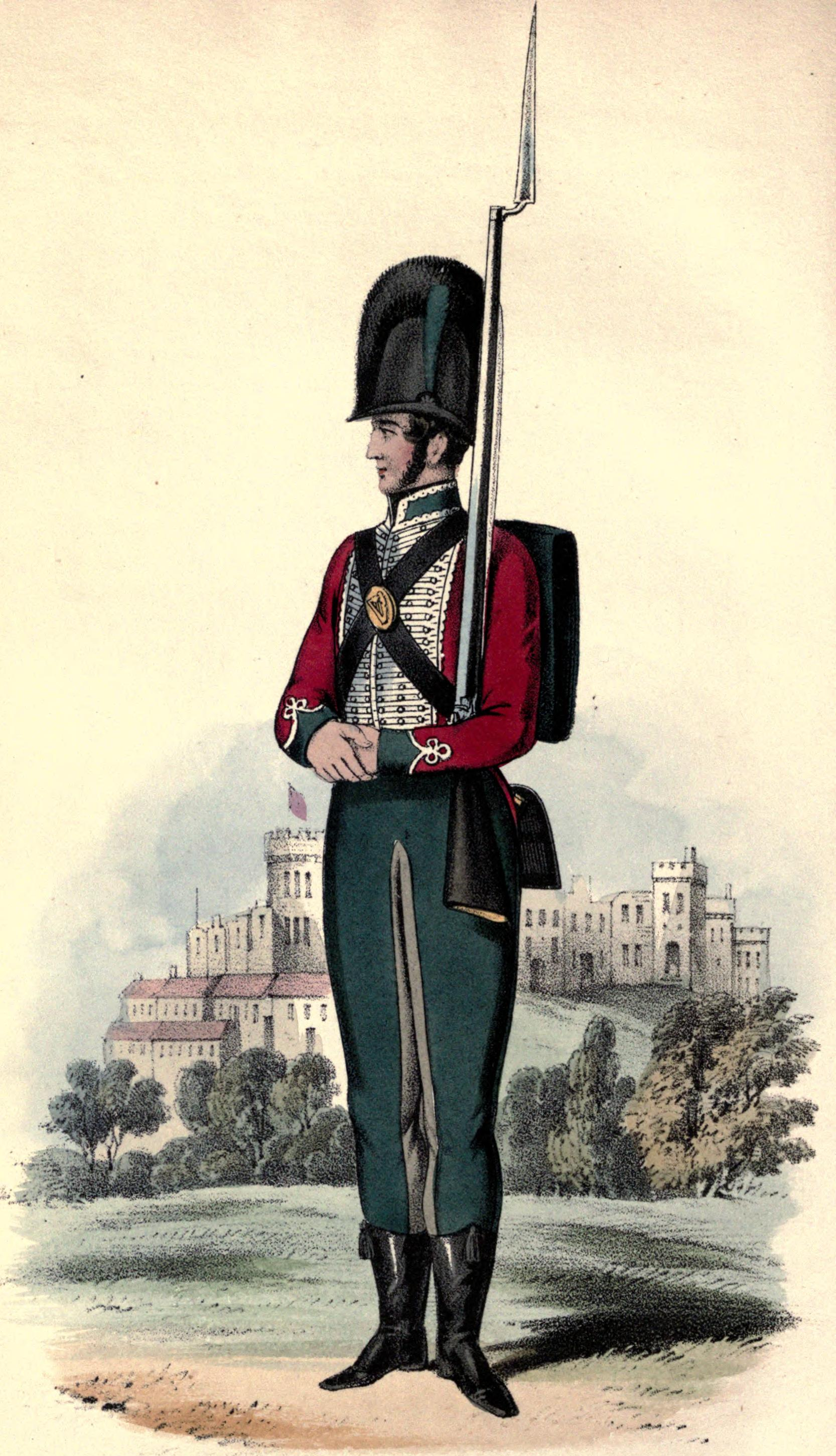
A regimental private in 1793

The regiment was raised by General Sir John Doyle as the 87th (The Prince of Wales's Irish) Regiment of Foot, in response to the threat posed by the French Revolution, on 18 September 1793. The regiment was named after the George, Prince of Wales, who later became King George IV. The regiment was sent to join the Duke of York's army in the Netherlands in summer 1794 as part of the unsuccessful defence of that country against the Republican French during the Flanders Campaign. The regiment repulsed a unit of French troops during a skirmish at Aalst in Belgium in July 1794 but was subsequently captured by the French Army at Bergen op Zoom in the Netherlands in 1795.

The regiment was reformed and embarked for the West Indies in October 1796 and helped carry out an unsuccessful attack on Puerto Rico in April 1797. It transferred to Saint Lucia later in the year, to Martinique in December 1799 and to Dominica in April 1800. It then moved on to Barbados in April 1801, to Curaçao in August 1801 and to Antigua in April 1803. After moving to Saint Kitts in June 1803, it embarked for home in July 1804.

=== Napoleonic Wars ===
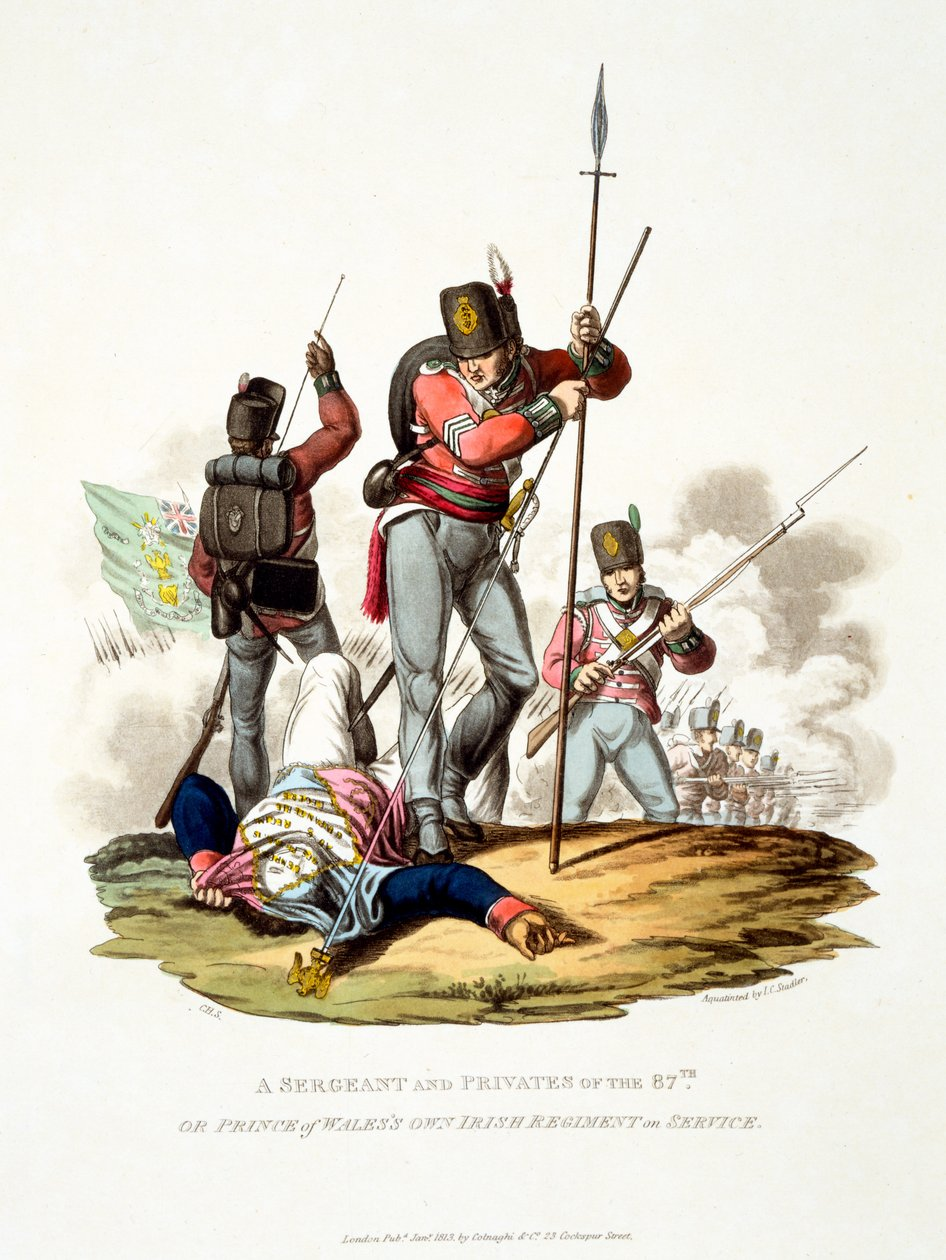
1813 engraving of regimental troops

A second battalion was raised in December 1804. The 1st Battalion sailed for South America in September 1806 and took part in the disastrous expedition under Sir Home Popham: it saw action at the Battle of Montevideo in February 1807 and the unsuccessful attack on Buenos Aires in July 1807. The regiment's light company were captured by Spanish troops during the attack although they were subsequently released.

The 1st Battalion sailed on to the Cape of Good Hope in August 1807 and then took part in the Invasion of Isle de France in December 1810. The regiment became the 87th (The Prince of Wales's Own Irish) Regiment of Foot in 1811. The 1st Battalion embarked for India in June 1815 and saw action in the Nepal Hills in January 1816 during the Anglo-Nepalese War. It amalgamated with the 2nd Battalion in February 1817.

Meanwhile, the 2nd Battalion landed in Lisbon for service in the Peninsular War in March 1809. It took part in the Battle of Talavera in July 1809 and the Battle of Barrosa in March 1811. At Barrosa, Ensign Edward Keogh and Sergeant Patrick Masterson captured the French Imperial Eagle of the 8th Regiment de Ligne. Keogh only managed to get a hand on the shaft when he was shot, bayoneted and killed. Masterson took over and, after killing several men, wrenched the Eagle from the dying hands of its bearer, Lieutenant Gazan. It was at the Battle of Barrosa that the regiment's motto 'Faugh A Ballagh' (‘Clear the Way’) was born.

The battalion also took part in the Siege of Tarifa in December 1812 and the Battle of Vitoria in June 1813. At Vitoria, it was bugler Paddy Shannon of the 2nd Battalion who "picked up" Marshal Jean-Baptiste Jourdan's baton at the end of the battle. The battalion then pursued the French Army into France and fought at the Battle of Nivelle in November 1813, the Battle of the Nive in December 1813 and the Battle of Orthez in February 1814 as well as the Battle of Toulouse in April 1814.

=== Victorian era ===
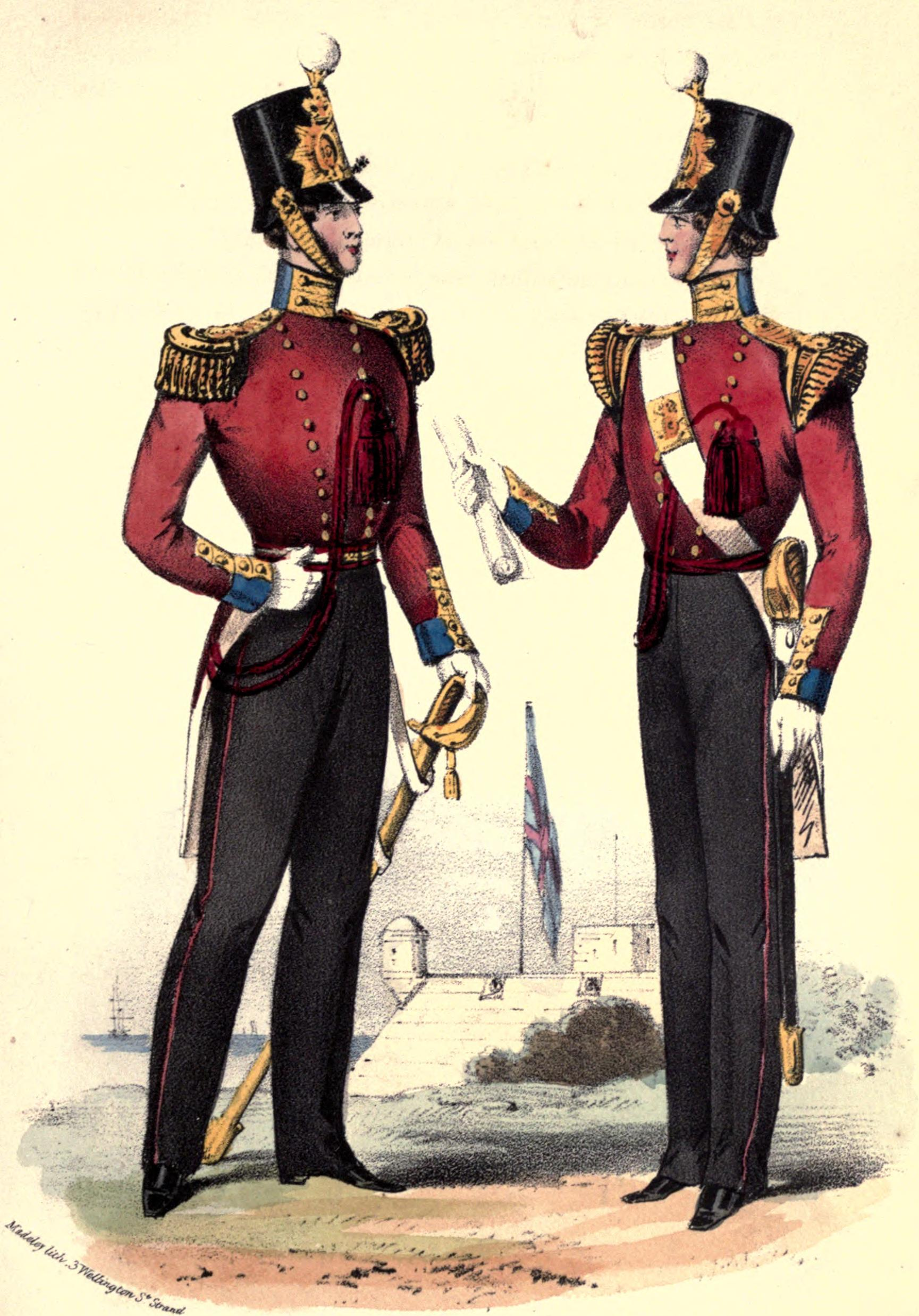
Two regimental officers in 1853

The regiment remained in India and was deployed to Burma in October 1825 for service in the First Anglo-Burmese War: it formed part of an army which advanced up the River Irrawaddy to the Kingdom of Ava. It returned to India arriving in Calcutta in November 1826 and embarked for England in February 1827. It became the 87th Regiment of Foot (or Prince of Wales's Own Irish Fusiliers) in July 1827 and the 87th (or Royal Irish Fusiliers) Regiment of Foot in November 1827.

The regiment embarked for Mauritius in February 1831 and remained there until it returned to England in June 1843. It went back to India in April 1849 and saw action on the North West Frontier during the Indian Rebellion. It embarked at Calcutta for Hong Kong in 1860 but returned home in 1861. It was posted to Gibraltar in 1866 and to Malta in 1868, before sailing for Nova Scotia in 1872, transferring to the Bermuda Garrison in 1876 and embarking for home in 1877.

As part of the Cardwell Reforms of the 1870s, where single-battalion regiments were linked together to share a single depot and recruiting district in the United Kingdom, the 87th was linked with the 88th Regiment of Foot (Connaught Rangers) and assigned to district no. 68 at Renmore Barracks in Galway. On 1 July 1881 the Childers Reforms came into effect and the regiment amalgamated with the 89th (Princess Victoria's) Regiment of Foot to form the Princess Victoria's (Royal Irish Fusiliers).

== Battle honours ==
Battle honours won by the regiment were:

- Napoleonic Wars: Monte Video
- Peninsular War: Talavera, Barrosa, Tarifa, Vittoria, Nivelle, Orthes, Toulouse, Peninsula
- First Anglo-Burmese War: Ava

== Colonels of the Regiment ==
Colonels of the Regiment were:

=== 87th (The Prince of Wales's Irish) Regiment of Foot ===
- 1796–1834: Gen. Sir John Doyle, Bt, GCB, KC

=== 87th (Royal Irish Fusiliers) Regiment of Foot – (1827) ===
- 1834–1841: Lt-Gen. Sir Thomas Reynell, Bt, KCB
- 1841–1855: F.M. Sir Hugh Gough, 1st Viscount Gough, KT, GCB, GCSI
- 1855–1863: Gen. Sir James Simpson, GCB
- 1863–1864: F.M. Lord William Paulet, GCB
- 1864–1870: Gen. Thomas Henry Johnston
- 1870–1881: Gen. Sir Charles Hastings Doyle, KCMG

== Sources ==
- Cannon, Richard (1853). Historical record of the Eighty-seventh Regiment, or the Royal Irish Fusiliers: containing an account of the formation of the regiment in 1793, and of its subsequent services to 1853. Parker, Furnivall and Parker.
- Fraser, Edward (1913). The Soldiers who Wellington Led. London: Methuen. pp. 129–148.
