= John Thomas Twining =

Canadian academic administrator

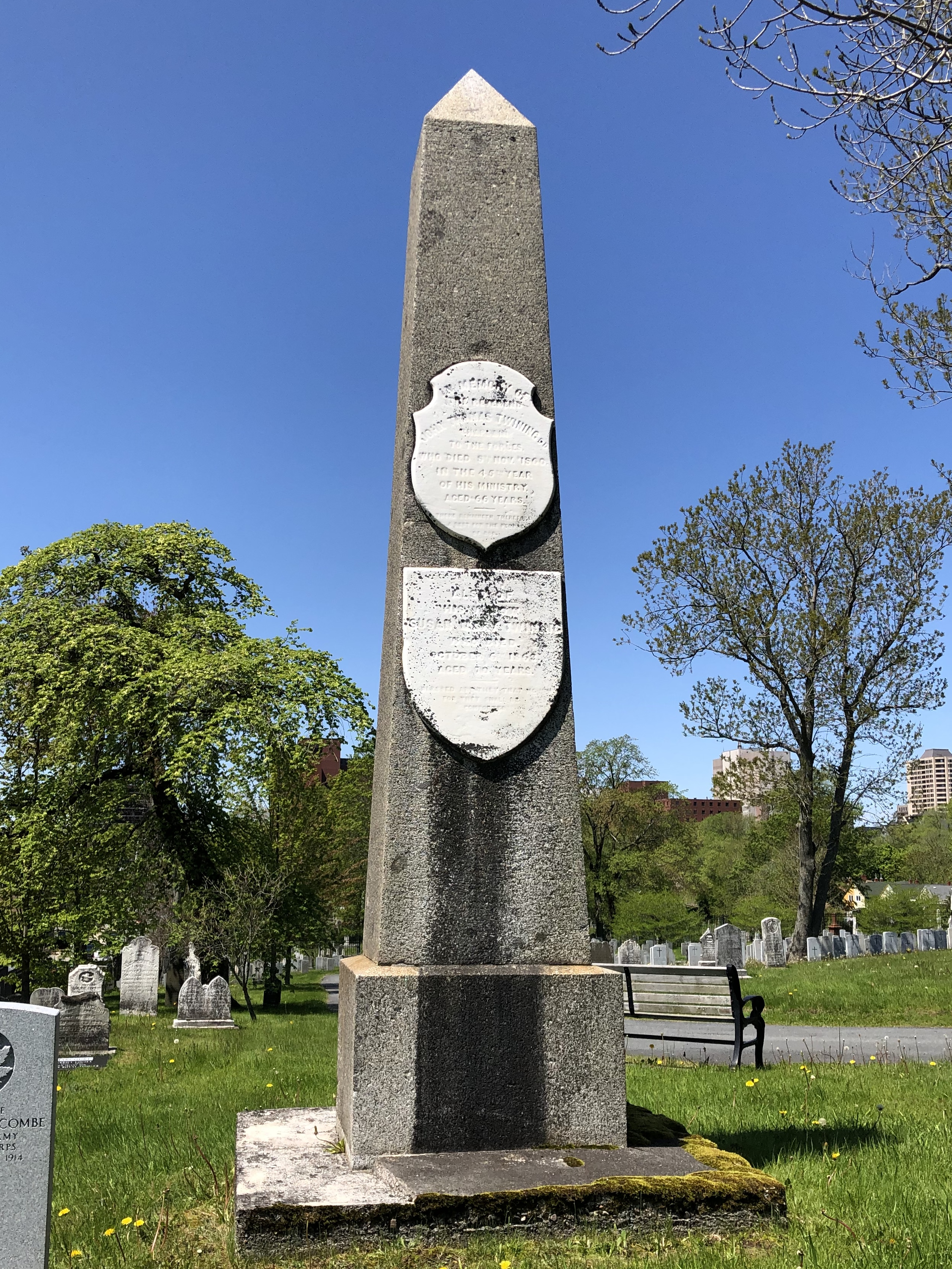
John Thomas Twining, Fort Massey Cemetery

John Thomas Twining (14 May 1793 – 8 November 1860) was a protestant minister in Nova Scotia. Twining served as principal of King’s College School in Windsor, Nova Scotia (1815-1817). He also served as a curate to John Inglis at St. Paul's Church (Halifax) (1817). Twining also became the headmaster of Halifax Grammar School (1819). He became the lifelong sinecure of the chaplain to the House of Assembly (1825). Twining fell out of favour with Inglis and was barred from entering the pulpits of parish churches. He held garrison services at 11 different buildings between 1817 and when a garrison chapel opened in 1846. He was a chaplain and educator for the garrison for the last 14 years of his life.

== Works ==
- The Age and its demands on Christian Young Men
