= Lord William Paulet =

Field Marshal Lord William Paulet GCB
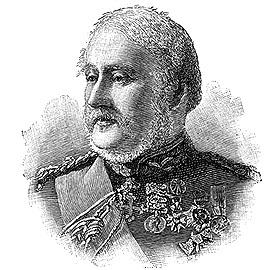
- Lord William Paulet
- Born: 7 July 1804; Andover, Hampshire
- Died: 9 May 1893 (aged 88); St. James's Square, London
- Military career
- Allegiance: United Kingdom
- Branch: British Army
- Service years: 1821–1870
- Rank: Field Marshal
- Commands: 1st Brigade at Aldershot; South-West District
- Conflicts: Crimean War
- Awards: Knight Grand Cross of the Order of the Bath

Field Marshal Lord William Paulet, GCB (7 July 1804 – 9 May 1893) was a senior British Army officer. During the Crimean War he served as Assistant Adjutant-General of the Cavalry Division, under Lord Lucan, at the Battle of Alma in September 1854, at the Battle of Balaklava in October 1854 and at the Battle of Inkerman in November 1854 as well as at the Siege of Sevastopol during the Crimean War. He was then given command of the rear area, including the Bosphorus, Gallipoli and the Dardanelles before returning to England. He later became Commander of the 1st Brigade at Aldershot in 1856, General Officer Commanding South-West District in 1860 and finally Adjutant-General to the Forces in 1865.

== Military career ==
Born the fourth son of Charles Paulet, 13th Marquess of Winchester and Anne Paulet (née Andrews), Paulet was educated at Eton College before being commissioned into the 85th (Duke of York's Own) Light Infantry on 1 February 1821. He became a lieutenant in the 7th Royal Fusiliers on 23 May 1822 and was promoted to captain in an unattached company on 25 February 1825.

Paulet transferred back to 85th (Duke of York's Own) Light Infantry on 21 April 1825 before briefly serving with the 63rd (West Suffolk) Regiment of Foot and then transferring to the 21st Royal North British Fusiliers on 4 December 1828 before being promoted to major on 10 September 1830. He transferred to the 68th Light Infantry on 18 January 1833 and was appointed commanding officer of that regiment with promotion to lieutenant colonel on 21 April 1843. In February 1851 he became an equerry to the Duke of Cambridge.

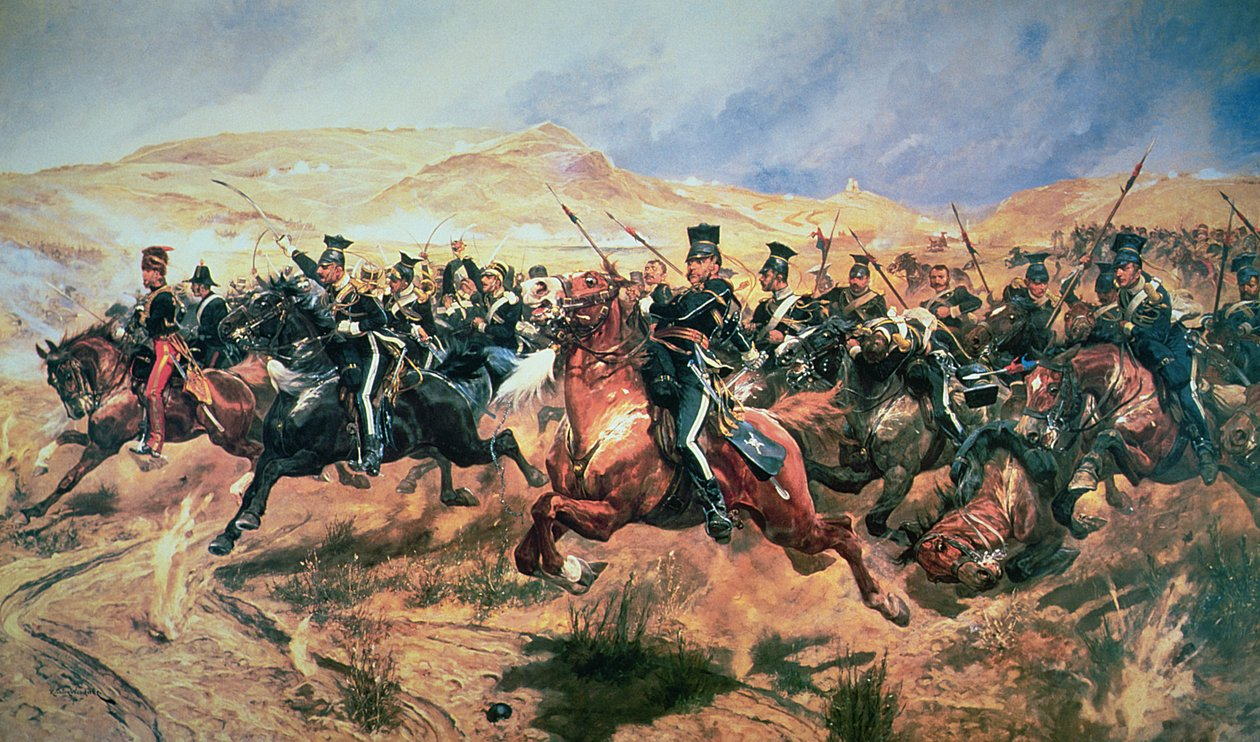
Charge of the Light Brigade, Balaclava, 25 October 1854 (Richard Caton Woodville Jr., 1894)

During the Crimean War Paulet served as Assistant Adjutant-General of the Cavalry Division, under Lord Lucan, earning promotion to brevet colonel on 20 June 1854. He fought at the Battle of Alma in September 1854, at the Battle of Balaklava (where his hat was shot off) in October 1854 and at the Battle of Inkerman in November 1854 as well as at the Siege of Sevastopol which was on-going at that time. He was then given command of the rear area, including the Bosphorus, Gallipoli and the Dardanelles, with promotion to the substantive rank of lieutenant colonel on 28 November 1854 and to the local rank of brigadier-general on 19 January 1855: in this capacity he gave his support to Florence Nightingale in her efforts to modernise medical support in the field. Promoted to the local rank of major-general in Turkey on 9 November 1855, he briefly commanded the Light Division before returning to England.

Paulet became Commander of the 1st Brigade at Aldershot with the local rank of major-general in August 1856 (back-dated to 24 July 1856) and then, having been promoted to the substantive rank of major-general on 13 December 1858, he became General Officer Commanding South-West District (which had its headquarters in Portsmouth) in 1860 and Adjutant-General to the Forces in July 1865. In May 1866 he was invited to join a Royal Commission to consider the existing system for recruitment in the British Army which was considered too large at the time. He was promoted to lieutenant general on 8 December 1867 and stood down as Adjutant-General in September 1870 but still received further promotions to full general on 7 October 1874 and to field marshal on 10 July 1886.

Paulet was also colonel of the 87th Regiment of Foot and later of the 68th Light Infantry (1st Battalion of the Durham Light Infantry from 1881). He died, unmarried, at his home in St. James's Square in London on 9 May 1893.

== Honours ==
Paulet's honours included:

- Knight Grand Cross of the Order of the Bath (GCB) - 20 May 1871 (KCB - 1865; CB - 5 July 1855)
- Legion of Honour, 4th Class (France) - 2 August 1856
- Order of the Medjidie, 3rd Class (Ottoman Empire) - 2 March 1858
- Order of Saints Maurice and Lazarus (Sardinia) - 11 August 1856

== Family ==
Paulet never married; he had no children.

== Sources ==
- Heathcote, Tony (1999). The British Field Marshals 1736–1997. Leo Cooper. ISBN 0-85052-696-5.

Military offices
Preceded by Sir James Scarlett	GOC South-West District; 1860–1865	Succeeded by Sir George Buller (As GOC Southern District)
Preceded by Sir James Yorke Scarlett	Adjutant General; 1865–1870	Succeeded by Sir Richard Airey
Preceded by James Simpson	Colonel of the 87th (Royal Irish; Fusiliers) Regiment of Foot; 1863–1864	Succeeded by Thomas Johnston
Preceded by Sir Robert Mansel	Colonel of the 68th (Durham); Regiment of Foot (Light Infantry) (1st Battalion of the Durham; Light Infantry from 1881); 1864–1893	Succeeded by William Fyers
