= John Ross (British Army officer, born 1829) =

British Army Officer

General Sir John Ross GCB DL
- Born: 18 March 1829; Hayton, Carlisle
- Died: 5 January 1905 (aged 75)
- Military career
- Allegiance: United Kingdom
- Branch: British Army
- Rank: General
- Conflicts: Crimean War; Indian Mutiny
- Awards: Knight Grand Cross of the Order of the Bath

General Sir John Ross GCB DL (18 March 1829 – 5 January 1905) was a soldier of the British Army and the Bengal Army who fought in the Crimean War and the Indian Mutiny and later commanded British forces in Canada.

== Military career ==
Born at Stone House, Hayton, Carlisle, the son of Field Marshal Sir Hew Dalrymple Ross (1779–1868) by his marriage to Elizabeth Graham, a daughter of Richard Graham, Ross was commissioned as a Second Lieutenant into the Rifle Brigade in 1846. Between 1854 and 1855 he saw active service in the Crimean War, fighting at the battles of Alma, Inkermann, and Sebastopol. In 1856 he was promoted Major and went out to India. Between 1857 and 1858 in the Indian Mutiny he was at Cawnpore and Lucknow, and in 1863–64 he fought in the North West Frontier Campaign. Promoted Brigadier-General in the Bengal Army in 1874, Ross commanded the Perak Expedition of 1875–1876. In 1878 he was in Malta, then served with the Second Division Calne Field Force from 1878 to 1879. In 1881 he was knighted, and between 1881 and 1886 he commanded the Poona Division of the Bombay Army, before going to North America as Commanding General of British forces in Canada from 1888 to 1893, on behalf of Governor General Lord Stanley of Preston. In 1891 Ross was promoted full General and he retired the service in 1896.

He was appointed colonel of the Leicestershire Regiment on 6 Feb. 1895, transferring to be colonel-commandant of the 3rd Battalion, the Rifle Brigade from 29 July 1903 to his death.

He died on 5 January 1905 at Kelloe, Berwickshire.

== Family ==
In 1868, Ross had married Mary Macleod Hay, the daughter of A. M. Hay, whom he divorced, and who predeceased him. In retirement he lived at his birthplace, Stone House, Hayton, Cumberland, where his grounds were said to contain an exceptionally impressive evergreen oak. In London he was a member of the United Service Club. His address at the time of his death was stated as Belgrave Mansions, Grosvenor Gardens, London SW.

== Honours ==
- 1861: Companion of the Order of the Bath
- 1881: Knight Commander of the Order of the Bath
- 1891: Knight Grand Cross of the Order of the Bath

== Notes ==
Military offices
Preceded by Lord Alexander Russell	Commander of the British Troops in Canada; 1888–1893	Succeeded by Alexander Montgomery Moore
