= William Norcott =

Lieutenant-General Sir William Norcott KCB
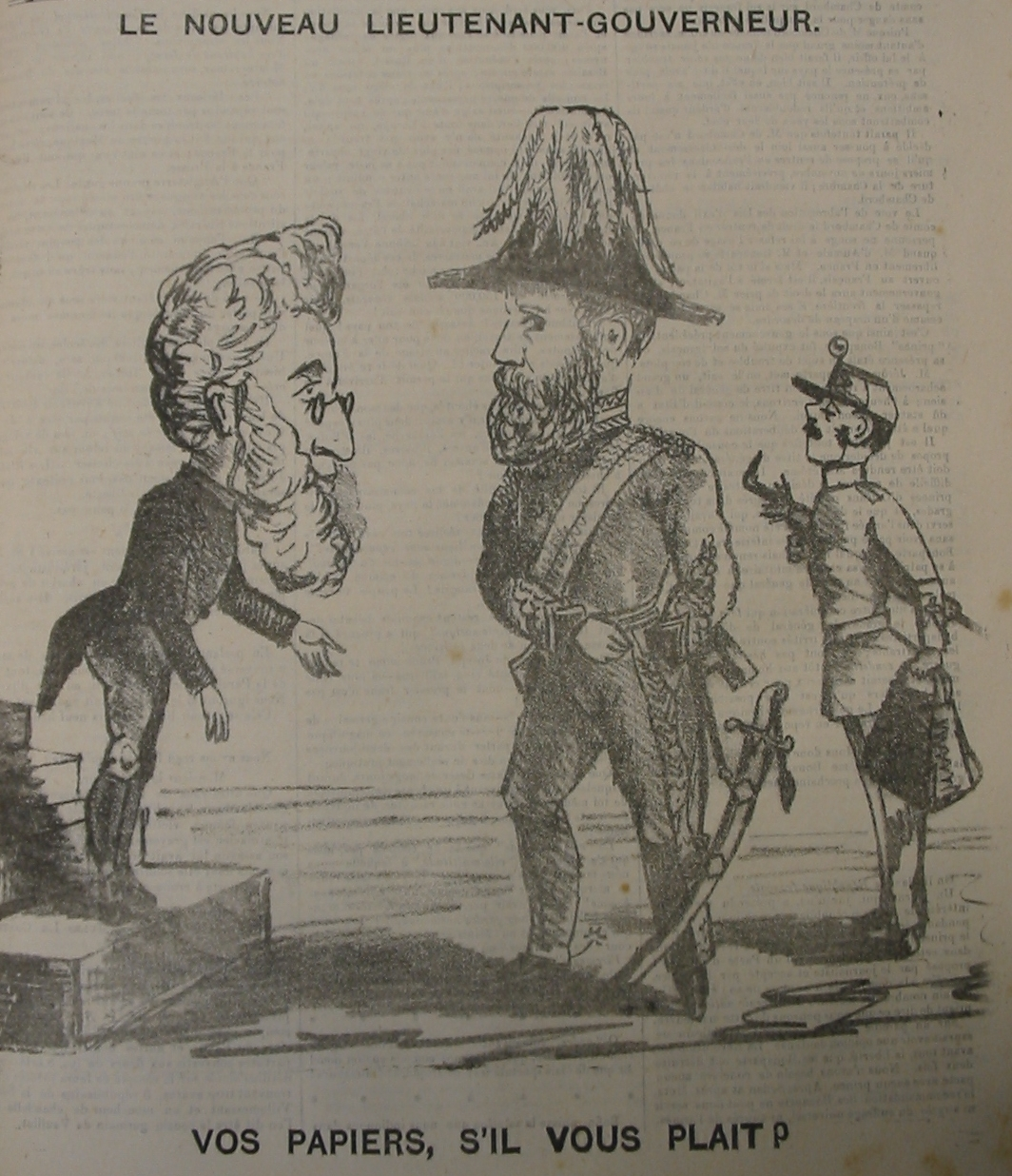
- Sir William Norcott (centre) arriving in Jersey
- Born: 12 December 1804; Chelmsford, Essex
- Died: 23 January 1886 (aged 81); St Leonards-on-Sea, Sussex
- Military career
- Allegiance: United Kingdom
- Branch: British Army
- Service years: 1822–1878
- Rank: Lieutenant-General
- Conflicts: Crimean War
- Awards: Knight Commander of the Order of the Bath

Lieutenant-General Sir William Sherbrooke Ramsey Norcott KCB (12 December 1804 – 23 January 1886) of the Rifle Brigade was a British Army officer who fought during the Crimean War, was an Aide-de-Camp to Queen Victoria and became Lieutenant Governor of Jersey.

== Early life ==
Norcott was born on 12 December 1804 in Chelmsford Essex, the second son to General Sir Amos Godsell Robert Norcott CB KCH who had commanded a battalion of the 95th Rifles at the Battle of Waterloo.

== Military career ==
Norcott was commissioned into the Rifle Brigade in 1822 and made a Captain of the 52nd Regiment in on 21 February 1840. Later the same year (7 August) he returned to the Rifles and on 1 August 1847 he was promoted to major.

During the Crimean War he fought at the Battle of Alma and commanded 1st Battalion, the Rifle Brigade at the Siege of Sevastopol.

Between 1855 and 1868 he was Aide-de-Camp to Queen Victoria, then went on to become Lieutenant Governor of Jersey between 1 October 1873 to 30 September 1878.

He was awarded the Knight of the Order of the Bath in 1877 and became a General in 1879.

== Later years ==
After his retirement he wrote some letters to The Times newspaper disputing some of the claims made about the battle of Alma.

== Family ==
In 1848 he married Frances Marrianne Durant; they had six children, at least 3 sons became soldiers.

- Charles Hawtrey Bruce Norcott born 25 April 1849 became a General of the Rifle Brigade.
- Walter Gordon Norcott born about 1851, became a Lieutenant-colonel in the Royal Munster Fusiliers (also served in the Royal Bengal Fusiliers)
- Gerald Alfred born about 1861 became a Major of the Loyal Regiment (North Lancashire) (having originally joined the 47th Foot and who died of Pneumonia whilst on staff service during World War I.

Military offices
| New regiment | Colonel of the 1st Battalion, The Loyal North Lancashire Regiment; 1881–1885 | Succeeded by Sir Richard Thomas Farren |
| Preceded by Sir William O'Grady Haly | Colonel of 47th (Lancashire) Regiment of Foot; 1878–1881 | Succeeded by Loyal Regiment (North Lancashire) |
| Preceded by Sir Alfred Horsford | Colonel-Commandant of the 2nd Battalion, The Prince Consort's Own (Rifle Brigade); 1885–1886 | Succeeded by Sir Alexander Macdonnell |
Government offices
| Preceded by Sir Philip Guy | Lieutenant Governor of Jersey; 1873–1878 | Succeeded by Sir Lothian Nicholson |
