= 47th (Lancashire) Regiment of Foot =

47th (The Lancashire) Regiment of Foot
- Active: 1741–1881
- Country: Kingdom of Great Britain (1741–1800); United Kingdom (1801–1881)
- Branch: British Army
- Size: One battalion (two battalions 1794–1795; 1803–1815)
- Garrison/HQ: Fulwood Barracks, Lancashire
- Nicknames: The Cauliflowers, The Lancashire Lads, Wolfe's Own
- Colors: White facings, white lace
- Engagements: 1745 Jacobite Rising; Father Le Loutre's War; Seven Years' War 1756-1763; American Revolutionary War; Napoleonic Wars; Third Anglo-Maratha War; First Anglo-Burmese War; Crimean War

The 47th (Lancashire) Regiment of Foot was an infantry regiment of the British Army, raised in Scotland in 1741. It served in North America during the Seven Years' War and American Revolutionary War and also fought during the Napoleonic Wars and the Crimean War. Under the Childers Reforms it amalgamated with the 81st Regiment of Foot (Loyal Lincoln Volunteers) to form the Loyal Regiment (North Lancashire) in 1881.

== History ==
=== Formation and early service ===
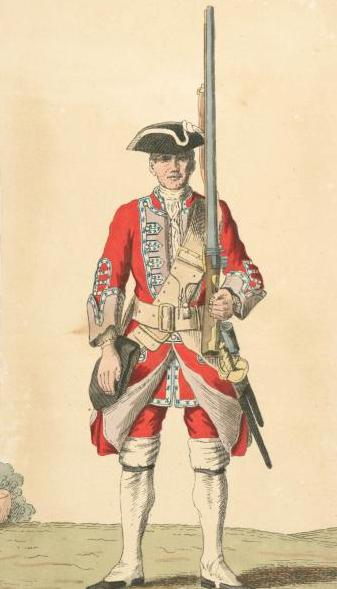
A regimental private in c. 1742

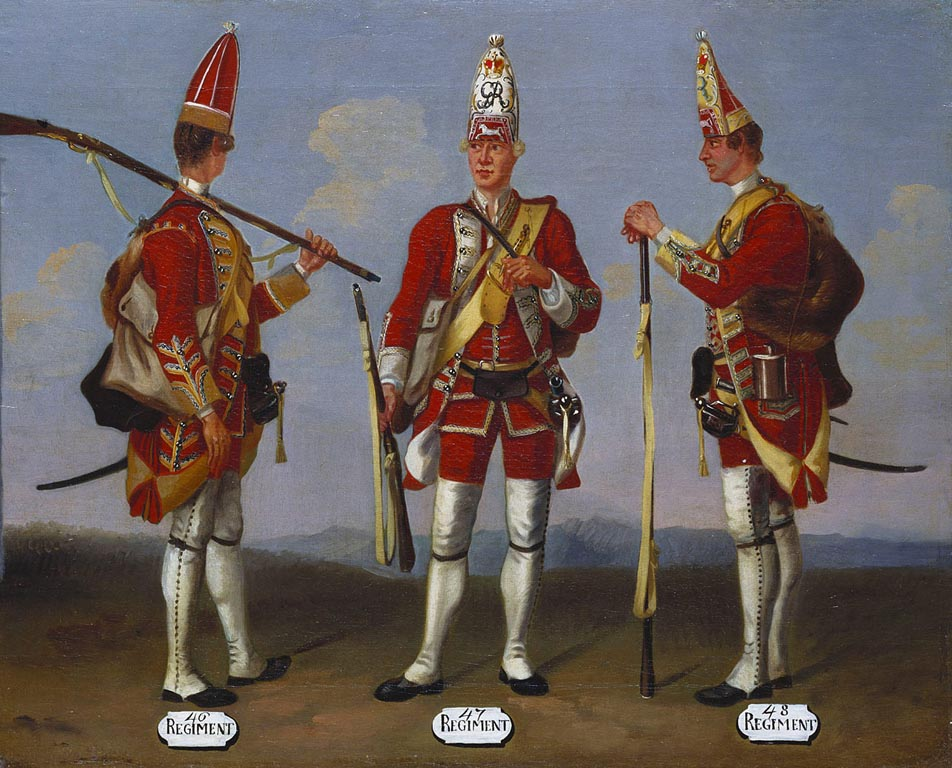
c. 1751 painting of a regimental grenadier (centre)

The regiment was raised in Scotland by Colonel Sir John Mordaunt as Sir John Mordaunt's Regiment of Foot in 1741. In 1743, Peregrine Lascelles was appointed Colonel and until May 1745, the regiment was employed building a military road near Loch Lomond, part of a new route from Dumbarton to Inverary.

In July, Charles Stuart landed in Scotland to launch the 1745 Rising and two companies of Lascelles garrisoned Edinburgh Castle. The remaining eight companies fought at the Battle of Prestonpans in September, when the government army was swept aside in less than 20 minutes; most of the regiment was taken prisoner, except for Lascelles who fought his way out.

Lascelles, together with Sir John Cope, commander at Prestonpans, and his deputy Thomas Fowke, were tried by a court-martial in 1746; all three were exonerated, but Cope never held a senior command again.

As part of the reforms enacted by the Duke of Cumberland, the regiment was designated the 58th Regiment of Foot in 1747, before being re-numbered 47th Regiment of Foot in 1751.

=== North America 1750–1794 ===
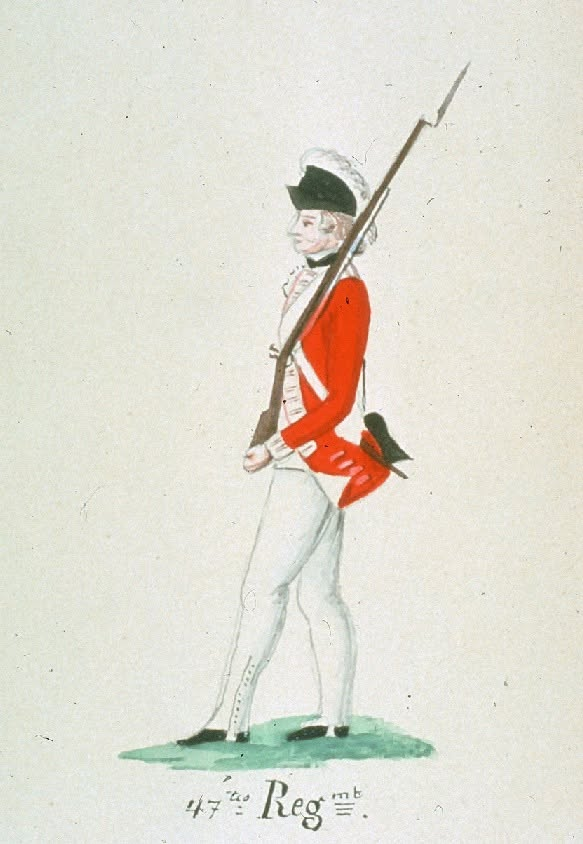
1777 watercolour of a regimental private

The 1748 Treaty of Aix-la-Chapelle awarded Britain sovereignty over the whole of Nova Scotia, including parts previously claimed by France. Between 1748 and 1755, conflict between British and French settlers resulted in a series of clashes known as Father Le Loutre's War; the regiment was posted there in 1750, taking part in the siege of Grand Pré, the Battle at Chignecto and the Battle of Fort Beauséjour.

During the Seven Years' War, it was part of the force under James Wolfe that captured Louisbourg in 1758, allegedly earning the nickname "Wolfe's Own". It was also present at the 1759 Battle of the Plains of Abraham, the Battle of Sainte-Foy and the subsequent siege of Quebec in April to May 1760. It then took part in the final and decisive campaign between July and September 1760 when Montreal fell. The regiment returned to Britain when the war ended in 1763.

On the outbreak of the American Revolutionary War in 1773, the 47th was posted to New Jersey. It took part in the Battles of Lexington and Concord in April 1775 and the Battle of Bunker Hill in June 1775 and the Battles of Saratoga in September 1777. The main body of the regiment was interned as part of the Convention Army and did not return home for another six years. In 1782 the regiment was given a county distinction when it was given the title the 47th (The Lancashire) Regiment of Foot. In 1791 the regiment was sent to the West Indies where it was garrisoned during much of the French Revolutionary Wars. In 1794 a second battalion was raised in Norfolk but disbanded soon afterwards.

=== Napoleonic Wars ===
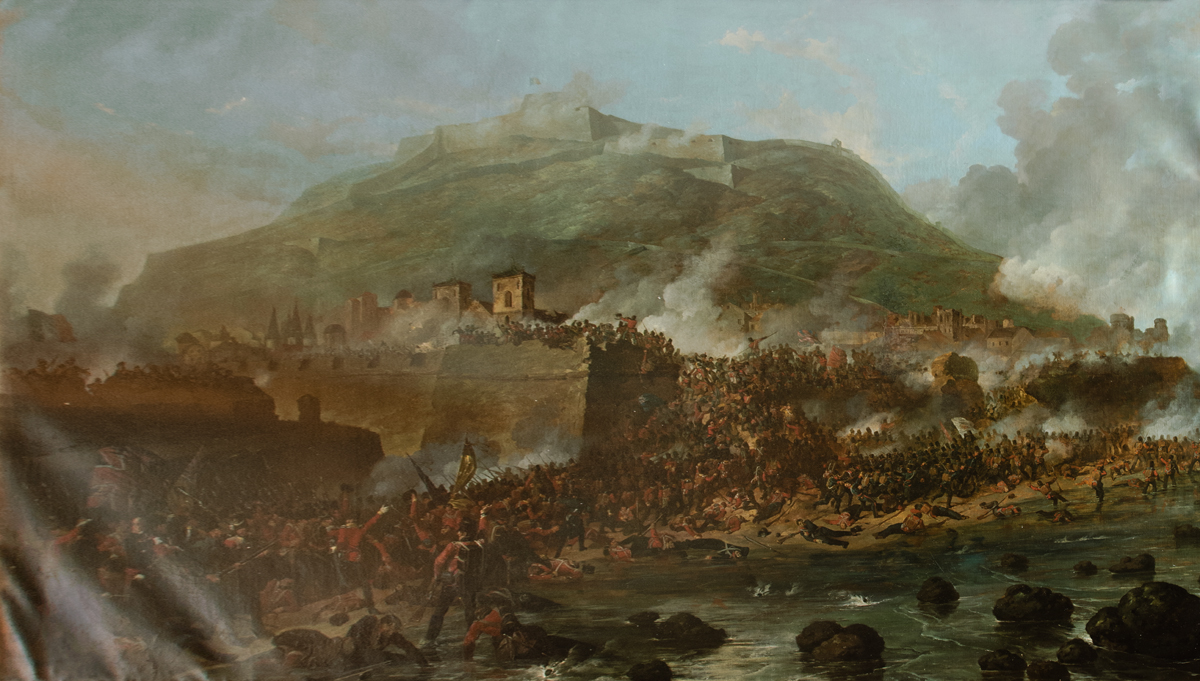
The siege of San Sebastián, which the regiment fought in

In 1803, a second battalion was reformed and the following year deployed to Ireland. In 1806, the 1st battalion was sent to garrison the former Dutch settlement of the Cape of Good Hope, then joined the 1807 River Plate expedition under Sir Samuel Auchmuty, fighting at Montevideo in February and Buenos Aires in July. The battalion was deployed to India in 1808 and the following year its flank companies took part in an expedition to the Persian Gulf.

Meanwhile, the 2nd battalion was deployed to Gibraltar in 1809 and to Portugal in 1811 for service in the Peninsular War. The battalion took part in the Battle of Barrosa in March 1811 and the successful siege of Tarifa in December 1811. The battalion was victorious at the Battle of Vitoria in June 1813 and took part in the successful but bloody siege of San Sebastián in August 1813. At San Sebastián the battalion lost 17 of its 22 officers and almost half the other ranks. The battalion then crossed the River Bidasoa and pursued the French Army into France fighting at the Battle of the Nive in December 1813 and taking part in the Battle of Bayonne in April 1814 before returning home and being disbanded at Portsmouth.

=== Victorian era ===
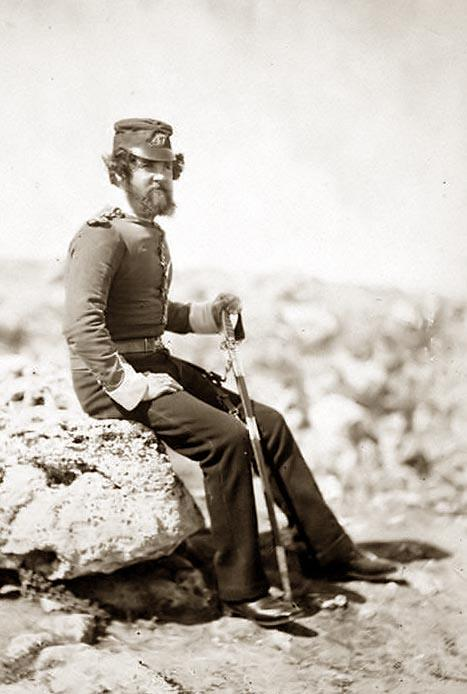
A regimental lieutenant in Crimea, 1855

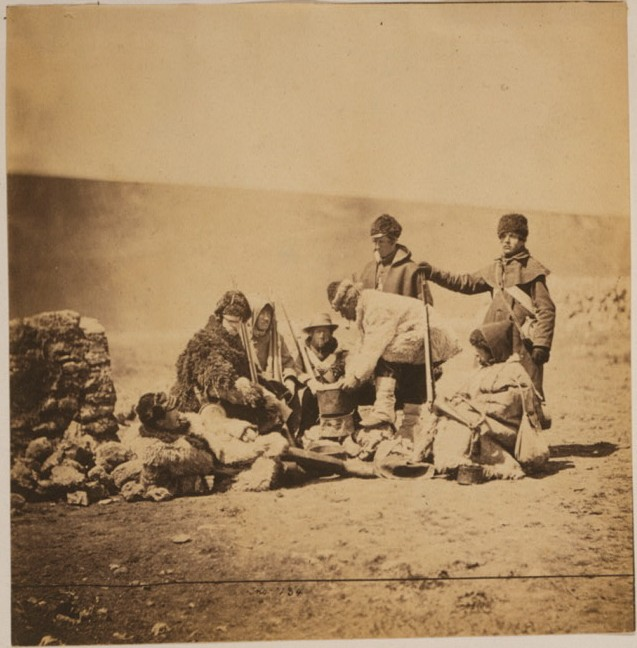
Regimental soldiers in Crimea, 1855

In 1817 the regiment was deployed to India and took part in the Third Anglo-Maratha War helping to defeat the Pindaris. It returned to the Persion Gulf in December 1819 to combat piracy off the shores of Ras al-Khaimah and was sent to Burma in 1824 for service in the First Anglo-Burmese War: it formed part of an army which advanced up the River Irrawaddy to the Kingdom of Ava before returning to India in 1826 and embarking for England in 1829.

The regiment was posted to the Ionian Islands in 1850 and to Malta in 1853 before landing at Calamity Bay in September 1854, as part of the 2nd Division, for service in the Crimean War. The regiment took part in the Battle of Alma in September 1854 and the Battle of Inkerman in November 1854 as well as the siege of Sevastopol in winter 1854. The regiment returned to Malta in 1856 and to England in 1857.

The regiment returned to Nova Scotia in 1861 to reinforce Canada's defences during tension with the United States arising from the Trent Affair. It then helped defend Canada against Irish-American ex-soldiers during the Fenian raids in 1866. The regiment then went to Barbados in 1868 before landing in Ireland in 1870.

As part of the Cardwell Reforms of the 1870s, where single-battalion regiments were linked together to share a single depot and recruiting district in the United Kingdom, the 47th was linked with the 81st Regiment of Foot (Loyal Lincoln Volunteers), and assigned to district no. 12 at Fulwood Barracks in Lancashire. On 1 July 1881 the Childers Reforms came into effect and the regiment amalgamated with the 81st Regiment of Foot (Loyal Lincoln Volunteers) to form the Loyal Regiment (North Lancashire).

== Battle honours ==
Battle honours won by the regiment were:

- Seven Years War: Louisbourg, Quebec 1759 (awarded to successor regiment, 1882)
- Peninsular War: Tarifa, Vittoria, San Sebastian, Nive, Peninsula (all awarded to successor regiment, 1910)
- Burmese Wars: Ava
- Crimean War: Alma, Inkerman, Sevastopol

== Victoria Cross ==
After the inception of the Victoria Cross (VC) in 1856 Private John McDermond was awarded the only VC of the regiment for his actions in saving a wounded Colonel during the Battle of Inkerman.

== Colonels ==
Colonels of the regiment were:

- 1741–1743: Gen. Sir John Mordaunt, KB
- 1743–1771: Gen. Peregrine Lascelles

The 47th Regiment of Foot - (1751)

- 1771–1790: Gen. Sir Guy Carleton, 1st Baron Dorchester, KB

The 47th (Lancashire) Regiment - (1782)

- 1790–1794: Lt-Gen. Sir Adam Williamson, KB
- 1794–1807: Gen. William Dalrymple
- 1807–1813: Gen. Hon. Richard Fitzpatrick
- 1813–1835: Gen. Hon. Sir Alexander Hope, GCB
- 1835–1847: Gen. Sir William Anson, 1st Baronet, KCB
- 1847: Lt-Gen. Sir Harry George Wakelyn Smith, Bt., GCB
- 1847–1854: Lt-Gen. Thomas Dalmer
- 1854–1865: Gen. Sir James Shaw Kennedy, KCB
- 1865–1867: Gen. Sir Charles Thomas van Straubenzee, GCB
- 1867–1875: Gen. John Patton
- 1875–1878: Gen. Sir William O'Grady Haly, KCB
- 1878–1881: Gen. Sir William Sherbrooke Ramsay Norcott, KCB
