= Amos Norcott =

English soldier

Major-General Sir Amos Norcott KCH CB
- Born: 3 August 1777; Westminster, London
- Died: 8 January 1838 (aged 60); Cork, Ireland
- Burial place: Saint Fin Barre's Cathedral, Cork; 51.8944°N 08.48064°W
- Spouse: Elizabeth Noble
- Military career
- Allegiance: United Kingdom
- Branch: British Army
- Rank: Major-General
- Units: 33rd Foot, 95th Rifles
- Commands: 2nd/95th Rifles; C-in-C Jamaica (1834); C-in-C Cork District
- Conflicts: Fourth Anglo-Mysore War; Peninsular War; Battle of Waterloo
- Awards: Companion of the Order of the Bath; Knight Commander of the Royal Guelphic Order

Major-General Sir Amos Godsell Robert Norcott CB KCH (3 August 1777 – 8 January 1838) was an English soldier of the 95th Rifles fought throughout the Peninsular War and at the Battle of Waterloo where he commanded a battalion. He later served as an acting Governor of Jamaica, before becoming the commander of Cork District.

== Early life ==
Norcott was born at Westminster, London, the only child of Lieutenant Amos Norcott of the Green Horse Regiment and Henrietta Gordon. He was born after the death of his father, who died en route to Barbados. He entered the British Army in 1793, joining the 33rd Foot Regiment as a second lieutenant and serving on the staff of his great-uncle, Robert Cuninghame, 1st Baron Rossmore, the Commander-in-Chief of Ireland.

== Military career ==
Norcott later served with his regiment in India. During his time there, he became friends with Arthur Wellesley (the future Duke of Wellington), who helped him pay off his gambling debts. In 1802 Norcott transferred into the newly formed 95th Rifles and served with them throughout the Peninsular War. Despite being wounded at the Battle of Corunna, he was promoted to the rank of acting lieutenant colonel and he commanded the six companies of 2nd/95th at the Battle of Waterloo. During the battle, he was badly wounded again; for his actions he was later invested as a Companion of the Order of the Bath.

His lieutenant colonelcy was confirmed on 9 September 1819 with the brevet rank of full colonel of the 8th Foot Regiment. He then became a major general in July 1830.

On 13 September 1831, Norcott was made a Knight Commander of the Royal Hanoverian Guelphic Order in a ceremony at St James's Palace. In 1834, he served as acting Governor of Jamaica before later becoming commander of the Cork District where he died at Marysboro House on 8 January 1838.

== Family ==
Amos Norcott married Elizabeth Noble, of Yorkshire, on 14 November 1801, and had three sons:

- Robert Norcott served in the army but died of cholera in India;
- William Sherbrooke Ramsey Norcott became a lieutenant general of the Rifle Brigade, fought in the Crimean War, and was Aide-de-camp to Queen Victoria;
- Charles Rossmore Robert Norcott became a superintendent of the Western Australia Police and later was an Aide-de-camp to his father in Cork; he died only six weeks after his father.

== Notes ==
=== Sources ===
- https://archive.org/stream/historyofriflebr00cope/historyofriflebr00cope_djvu.txt Sir William Cope's History of The Rifle Brigade

Government offices
Preceded by Constantine Phipps	Governor of Jamaica, acting 1834	Succeeded by George Cuthbert, acting
