= Gordon Riots =

Event in London in 1780

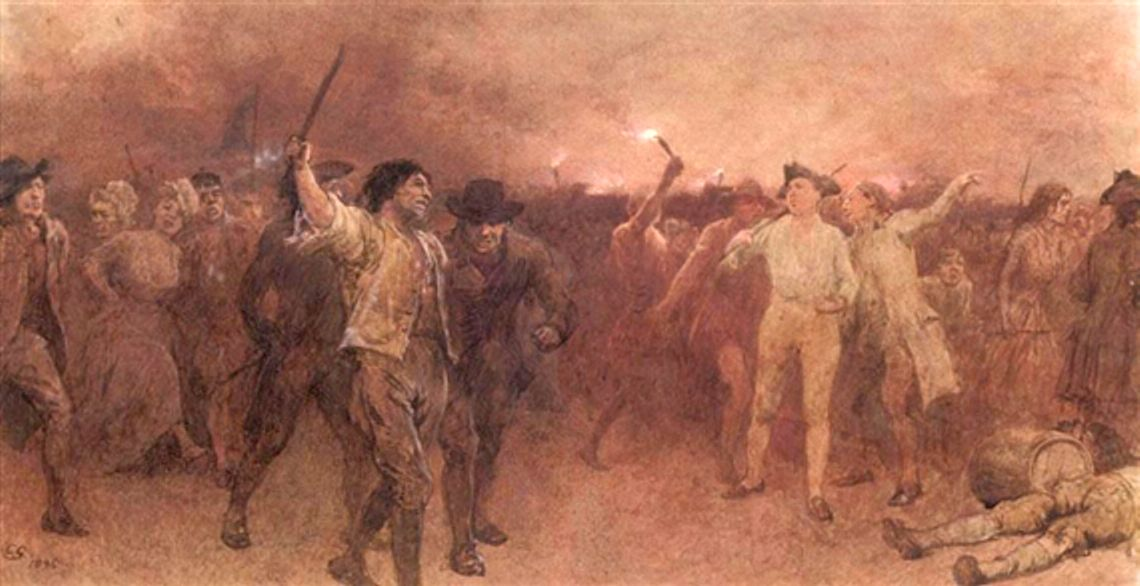
- The Gordon Riots by Charles Green
- Date: 2–9 June 1780
- Location: London, England
- Caused by: Papists Act 1778, anti-Catholicism in the United Kingdom

Parties
Protestant Association	Government of Great Britain
	British Army
	County Militia & London Militia
	Bow Street Runners

Casualties
- Deaths: 300–700

The Gordon Riots in London in 1780 involved several days of unrest and violence motivated by anti-Catholic sentiment. They began on 2 June 1780 with a large and orderly protest against the Papists Act 1778 (18 Geo. 3. c. 60), which had somewhat reduced official discrimination against British Catholics enacted by the Popery Act 1698 (11 Will. 3. c. 4). The Protestant Association, headed by Lord George Gordon, MP, noted that the law (also known as the Catholic Relief Act) enabled Catholics to join the British Army and warned that the relaxation might enable Catholic soldiers to plot treason. The resultant protest led to widespread rioting and looting, including attacks on the buildings of Newgate Prison and of the Bank of England, and was the most destructive in the history of London.

Violence started on 2 June 1780, with the looting and burning of Catholic chapels in foreign embassies. Local magistrates, afraid of drawing the mob's anger, did not invoke the Riot Act. There was no repression until the government finally sent in the army, resulting in an estimated 300–700 deaths. The main violence lasted until 9 June 1780.

The riots occurred near the height of the American War of Independence of 1775 to 1783, at a time when the Kingdom of Great Britain, with no major allies, not only had an American colonial rebellion to suppress, but had also become embroiled in wars against France and Spain, and would soon go to war against the Dutch Republic as well. Public opinion, especially in middle-class and elite circles, repudiated anti-Catholicism and lower-class violence, and rallied behind Lord North's government. Many urgently demanded the formation of a police force. There appeared painted on the wall of Newgate Prison a proclamation that the inmates had been freed by the authority of "His Majesty, King Mob". The term "King Mob" afterwards denoted an unruly and fearsome proletariat.

Edmund Burke later recalled the riots as a dangerous foretaste of the 1789 French Revolution:

Wild and savage insurrection quitted the woods, and prowled about our streets in the name of reform.... A sort of national convention ... nosed parliament in the very seat of its authority; sat with a sort of superintendence over it; and little less than dictated to it, not only laws, but the very form and essence of legislature itself.

== Background ==
Lord George Gordon, head of the Protestant Association

The stated intention of the Papists Act 1778 was, as its preamble notes, to mitigate some of the official discrimination against Roman Catholics in Great Britain. It absolved Catholics from taking the religious oath when joining the British Armed Forces as well as granting a few and limited liberties. There were strong expedient reasons for this change. British military forces at the time were stretched very thinly in what had become a global American War of Independence, with conflicts ongoing with France, Spain, and the new United States. The recruitment of Catholics would be a significant help to address this shortfall of manpower.

The 1698 anti-Catholic laws had largely been ignored for many years and were rarely enforced. Because of this, many leading Catholics were opposed to the repeal of these laws, fearing it would stir up anti-Catholic sentiment for little practical return. It was also pointed out that large numbers of Catholics, recruited in Ireland and the Scottish Highlands, were already serving in the military. In spite of this, the government decided to press ahead with the Bill, and had it introduced in Parliament by Sir George Savile.

=== Protestant Association ===
The Protestant Association of London had the support of leading Calvinist religious figures, including Rowland Hill, Erasmus Middleton, and John Rippon. Lord George Gordon became its president in 1779, in an effort to force the repeal of the Papists Act. An articulate propagandist, though eccentric, Gordon inflamed the mob with fears of Papism and a return to absolute monarchical rule. He implied that Catholics in the military would, given a chance, join forces with their co-religionists on the Continent and attack Britain. He enjoyed popularity in Scotland where he took part in a successful campaign to prevent the same legislation from being introduced into Scots law, although the Act continued in force in England and Wales and in Ireland. The success in obstructing the law in Scotland led Gordon to believe he could enjoy similar success in the rest of Britain and Ireland. Early in 1780 Gordon had several audiences with King George III but was unable to convince him of what he saw as the dangers of the act. George III initially humoured Gordon, but grew increasingly irritated with him and eventually refused any future audiences.

The political climate deteriorated rapidly. On 29 May 1780, Gordon called a meeting of the Protestant Association, and his followers subsequently marched on the House of Commons to deliver a petition demanding the repeal of the Act, a proceeding which set off a riot.

=== Other causes ===
After the first march to Parliament, further riots occurred involving groups whose grievances were nationalist, economic, or political, rather than religious. Aside from the issue of Catholic emancipation, it has also been suggested that the driving force of the riots was Britain's poor economic situation: the loss of trade during the war had led to falling wages, rising prices, and periodic unemployment. As Rudé noted, there was no general attack on the Catholic community, "the victims of the riots" being distinguished by the fact they were "on the whole, persons of substance".

Voting in parliamentary elections was restricted by a property threshold, so most Londoners were unable to vote and many hoped for reforms to make Parliament more representative of the people. However, Paul Monod has argued that "no matter how much one would like to interpret the Gordon Riots ... as economically motivated, they remain fundamentally anti-Catholic in character".

Shortly after the riots had broken out, the Duke of Richmond suggested that they were directly attributable to the passing of the Quebec Act six years before, which, among other provisions, removed the reference to the Protestant faith from the oath of allegiance, and guaranteed free practice of Catholicism. This view was ridiculed by many of his colleagues.

Another suggested cause was Britain's weakened international position, which had arisen from the country's isolation in Europe and the disappointing news coming from the ongoing war. Some rioters were against the continuation of the war, and many strongly supported American independence, while others believed that Britain's war effort was being mishandled by Lord North. In many cases a mix of issues blended together and drove people to take part in the rioting.

== Riots ==
=== March on Parliament ===
On 2 June 1780 a huge crowd, estimated at 40,000 to 60,000 strong, assembled and marched on the Houses of Parliament. Many carried flags and banners proclaiming "No Popery", and most wore blue cockades which had become the symbol of their movement. As they marched, their numbers swelled. They attempted to force their way into the House of Commons, but without success. Gordon, petition in hand, and wearing in his hat the blue cockade of the Protestant Association, entered the Commons and presented the petition. Outside, the situation quickly got out of hand and a riot erupted. Members of the House of Lords were attacked as they arrived, and a number of carriages were vandalised and destroyed.

Despite being aware of the possibility of trouble, the authorities had failed to take steps to prevent violence breaking out. The Prime Minister, Lord North, had forgotten to issue an order mobilising the small number of Constables in the area. Those that were present in the House of Commons were not strong enough to take on the angry mob. Eventually a detachment of soldiers was summoned, and they dispersed the crowd without violence. Inside the House of Commons, the petition was overwhelmingly dismissed by a vote of 192 to 6.

=== Embassies attacked ===
Once the mob around Parliament had dispersed, it seemed to the government that the worst of the disorder was over. However, the same night a crowd gathered and attacked the Roman Catholic Sardinian Embassy Chapel in Lincoln's Inn Fields. Bow Street Runners and soldiers were called out and made thirteen arrests, although most of the ringleaders had managed to escape. The same night the chapel of the Bavarian Embassy in Warwick Street, Soho, was destroyed and crowds caused random violence in streets known to house rich Catholics.

=== Moorfields ===
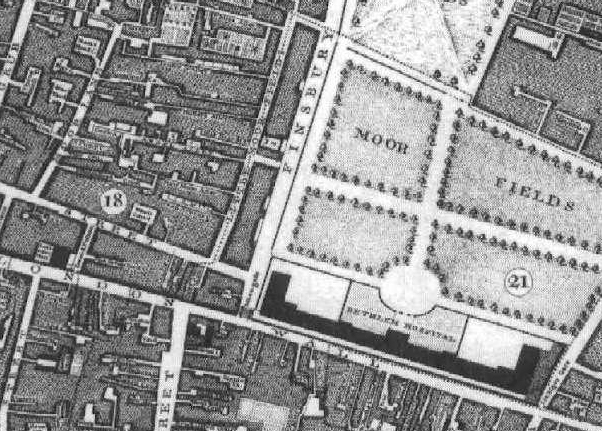
Map of London Wall, Moorgate, Moorfields and Bethlem Royal Hospital from John Rocque's Map of London, dated 1746.

The area of Moorfields, one of the poorest parts of the city, was the home of many Irish immigrant workers and had a large area of open ground where crowds could assemble. Despite the appeal of a prominent Irish merchant, James Malo, to the Lord Mayor, Brackley Kennett, no additional protection was offered to the area. During 3 June a crowd had gathered in Moorfields, and by nightfall it began to go on the rampage. Malo's house was amongst the many to be sacked and burned.

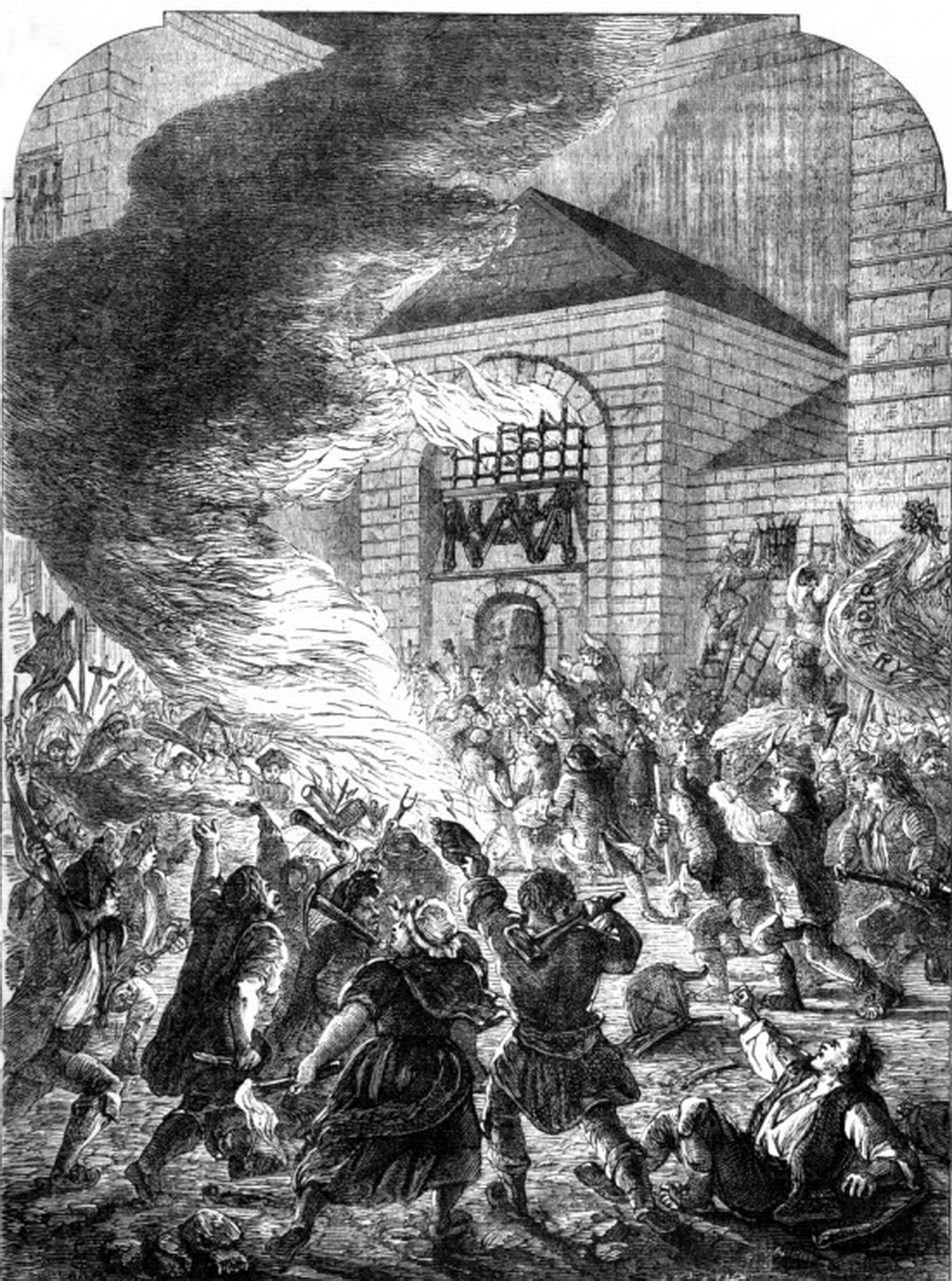
The No Popery Rioters Burning the Prison of Newgate

Newgate Prison, where rioters arrested on 2 June were being held, was attacked and largely destroyed, as was The Clink. This allowed large numbers of prisoners to escape, many of whom were never recaptured. Severe destruction was inflicted on Catholic churches and homes and chapels on the grounds of several embassies, as well as on New Prison, Fleet Prison, and the house of the Lord Chief Justice, William Murray, 1st Earl of Mansfield, including the destruction of the house's library. On 7 June, called "Black Wednesday" by Horace Walpole, the riot reached its climax. An attempt on the Bank of England was narrowly averted when a combination of the London Military Association and regular troops repulsed rioters, resulting in heavy casualties.

=== Army repression ===
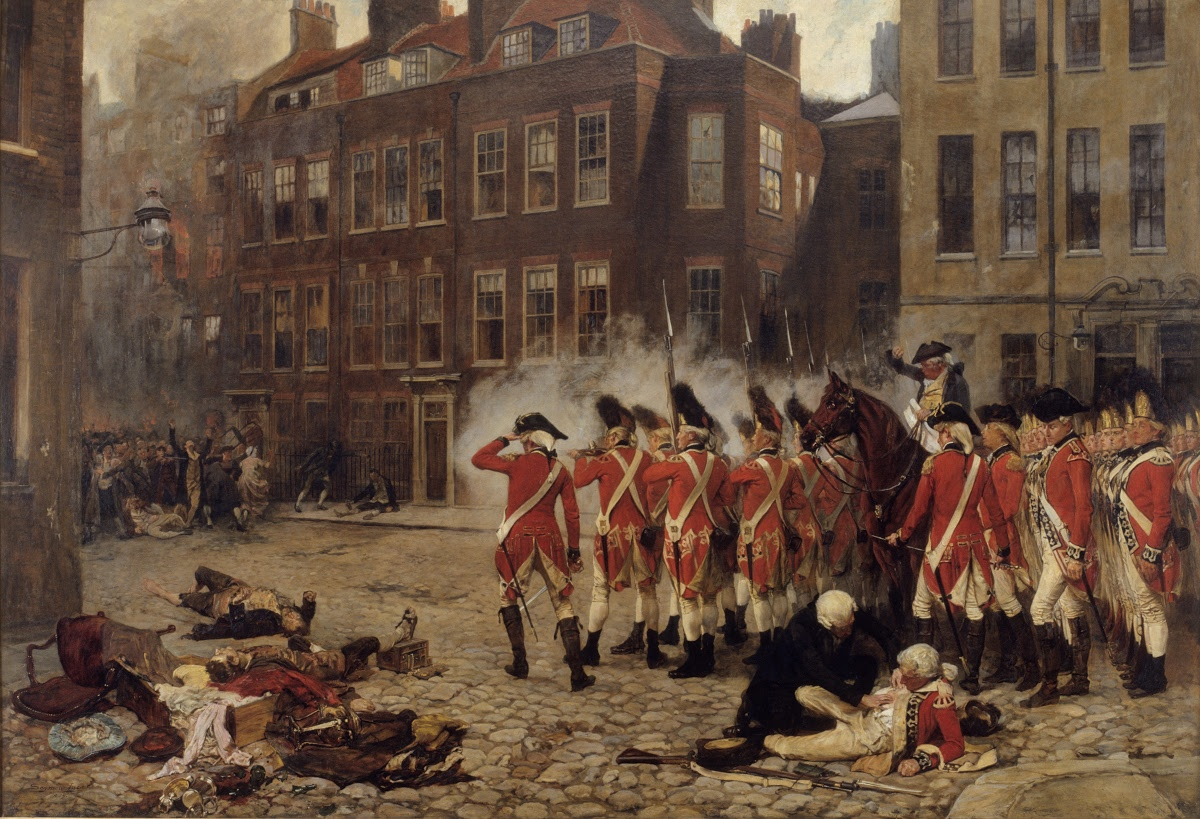
The Gordon Riots by John Seymour Lucas, 1879. Soldiers are shown deployed to confront the rioters.

The army was called out on 7 June and given orders to fire upon groups of four or more who refused to disperse. About 285 people were shot dead, with another 200 wounded. Around 450 of the rioters were arrested. Of those arrested, about twenty or thirty were later tried and executed. Gordon was arrested and charged with high treason but was acquitted. Brackley Kennett, the Lord Mayor, was convicted of criminal negligence for not reading out the Riot Act and was given a £1,000 fine. The military units which dealt with the rioters included the Horse Guards, Foot Guards, Inns of Court Yeomanry, the Honourable Artillery Company, line infantry including the 2nd (Queen's Royal) Regiment, and militia from the city and neighbouring counties. The defence of the Bank of England was conducted by the 9th Regiment of Foot under the command of Thomas Twisleton, 13th Baron Saye and Sele.

== Aftermath ==
The riots damaged the reputation of Britain across Europe, where many saw British constitutional monarchy as an inherently unstable form of government. This came at a time during the American War of Independence when Britain was searching for allies, particularly Catholic Austria, to challenge the strong coalition the French had built. Britain had also initiated secret negotiations with Catholic Spain to end Spanish support of the United States. After learning of the riots, the Spanish government pulled back from peace negotiations with Britain, concerned that the disorder would lead to a widespread collapse of the current British administration.

The riots highlighted the problems Britain faced in lacking a professional police force, a notion which was opposed as foreign and absolutist. The day after the riots broke out, the Earl of Shelburne shocked many by proposing in parliament that Britain should consider forming a force modelled on the French police. Subsequent reforms aimed to improve London policing.

The riots damaged the popularity of the radical politician John Wilkes, who led citizen-militia against the rioters. Many of his followers saw his action as a betrayal; some of them may have been among the rioters. The polemicist and hymn-writer Maria De Fleury wrote and published a pamphlet and a book of poems defending the role of Gordon.

The events at the Bank of England started a tradition whereby a detachment of soldiers, usually from the Brigade of Guards, would march to the bank to perform security duties. Until 1963 the duty was performed by the Guards in Home Service Dress with bearskin, though tennis shoes were worn inside the bank. From that date until 31 March 1973 the detachment became more functional than ceremonial, doing their duties in service dress with automatic weapons.

In 1781, George Gordon was tried for "constructive treason" for his role in the riots. He was acquitted after the defense (led by his cousin Thomas Erskine) argued that the charge was an illegal extension of existing treason law. This result led Parliament to formally incorporate constructive treason into statutory law.

In 1786, Gordon was convicted of libel against Marie Antoinette, the French ambassador Jean-Balthazar d'Adhémar, and the administration of justice, but he absconded to the Netherlands to escape punishment. Upon his return to Birmingham, he converted to Judaism and took the name Yisrael ben Avraham Gordon. He was soon apprehended and sentenced to five years' imprisonment in Newgate.

== Cultural references ==
George Walker's anti-Jacobin novel The Vagabond (1799) anachronistically resituates the Gordon Riots amidst the political events of the 1790s. Its narrator unwittingly becomes a prominent figure in the riots, which Walker depicts as solely destructive and acquisitive.

Maria Edgeworth's 1817 novel Harrington contains a vivid evocation of the Gordon Riots, with two unsympathetic characters taken for Papists and finding refuge in the home of the rich Spanish Jew, the father of the young Jewish woman at the centre of the love story.

Charles Dickens' 1841 novel Barnaby Rudge is centred on a long and detailed description of the Gordon Riots and features Lord George in a prominent role.

John Creasey's 1974 novel The Masters of Bow Street depicts the Gordon Riots and the recalcitrance of Lord North to the establishment of a police force.

In Bernard Cornwell's Sharpe novels (1981–2007), the protagonist Richard Sharpe's mother was killed during the riots while he was still a child.

In the film The Great Rock'n'Roll Swindle, a scene set in 1780 refers to the Gordon Riots, showing the Sex Pistols hung in effigy.

BABYLONdon, a novel by English SF/Fantasy author John Whitbourn (2020), blends a detailed depiction of the Gordon Riots with supernatural plot elements and an apocalyptic denouement.

The Invisibles, a comic series by Grant Morrison features a principal character mostly known as King Mob.

Mentioned by Peter O'Toole's character to Aldo Ray in The Day They Robbed the Bank of England (1960), referencing that he and his men had been guarding the titular bank in a certain fashion since "the Gordon Riots in 1780."

== See also ==
- Anti-Catholicism in the United Kingdom

== Sources ==
- Babington, Anthony (1990). Military intervention in Britain: from the Gordon riots to the Gibraltar Incident. Routledge.
- Black, Eugene Charlton (1963). "The Tumultuous Petitioners: The Protestant Association in Scotland, 1778–1780". Review of Politics. 25 (2): 183–211. doi:10.1017/S003467050000485X. S2CID 146502784.
- Boeker, Uwe. The Gordon Riots. Dresden University of Technology – TU Dresden, Institute for English and American Studies.
- Burney, Susan (2012). "Journal Letter, June 5–12, 1780". In Olleson, Philip (ed.). The Journals and Letters of Susan Burney. Ashgate. pp. 168–181. ISBN 978-0-7546-5592-3.
- Green, Dominic (2013). "The Making of a "Protestant Rabbin". The Cultural Transfers of Lord George Gordon, 1781–1793". In Schulze, Thies (ed.). Grenzueberschreitende Religion. Vergleichs- und Kulturtransferstudien zur neuzeitlichen Geschichte. Goettingen: Vandenhoeck & Ruprecht. pp. 165–184.
- Haydon, Colin (1993). Anti-Catholicism in Eighteenth-Century England, C. 1714–80: A Political and Social Study.
- Haydon, Colin (2013). "Eighteenth-Century English Anti-Catholicism: Contexts, Continuity and Diminution.". In Wolffe, John (ed.). Protestant-Catholic Conflict from the Reformation to the Twenty-first Century. Palgrave Macmillan UK. pp. 46–70.
- Hibbert, Christopher (1959). King Mob: The Story of Lord George Gordon and the Riots of 1780. Dorset Press. ISBN 0-88029-399-3.; popular history online
- Jones, Brad A. (2013). "'In Favour of Popery': Patriotism, Protestantism, and the Gordon Riots in the Revolutionary British Atlantic". Journal of British Studies. 52 (1): 79–102. doi:10.1017/jbr.2012.60.
- McDonagh, Patrick (2006). "Barnaby Rudge, 'idiocy' and paternalism: Assisting the 'poor idiot'". Disability & Society. 21 (5): 411–423. doi:10.1080/09687590600785779. S2CID 144804564.
- Pollen, John Hungerford (1909). "Gordon Riots". In Herbermann, Charles George (ed.). The Catholic Encyclopedia. New York: Robert Appleton Co.
- Rudé, George (July 1955). "The Gordon Riots". History Today. 5 (7): 429–437.
- Rudé, George (1956). "The Gordon Riots: A Study of the Rioters and their Victims". Transactions of the Royal Historical Society. 5th. 6 (6): 93–114. doi:10.2307/3678842. JSTOR 3678842. S2CID 155720228.
- Rudé, George (1974). The Gordon Riots, in Paris and London in the Eighteenth Century. London: Fontana/Collins.
- Rudé, George (2005). "'Church and King' Riots". The Crowd in History. London: Serif.
- Rogers, Nicholas (1998). "The Gordon Riots". Crowds, Culture and Politics in Georgian Britain. Clarendon Press. pp. 152–175.
- Nicholson, John (1985). The Great Liberty Riot of 1780. Bozo. ISBN 0-904063-16-X.
- Simms, Brendan (2008). Three Victories and a Defeat: The Rise and Fall of the First British Empire. Penguin Books.
