= 4th Parliament of William III =

The 4th Parliament of William III was summoned by William III of England on 13 July 1698 and assembled on 24 August 1698 (but prorogued until 6 December 1698). The party political constitution of the new House of Commons was 246 Whigs, 208 Tories and 59 others. Sir Thomas Littleton, the Whig member for Woodstock, was elected Speaker of the House. The house was divided between the pro-government faction led by the Whig Junto and a Country Whig-Tory alliance, the New Country party, led by Robert Harley.

== Decision to reduce the size of the standing army in England ==
Once assembled the House returned to the question of the size of the standing army. Harley moved, and the House accepted, that the English establishment be reduced to 7,000 (plus a further 12,000 on the Irish establishment). By the end of the first session the Whig Junto were reeling from further attacks of the Opposition and during the summer recess Edward Russell (now Lord Orford) resigned from the Admiralty and Charles Montagu, 1st Earl of Halifax from the Treasury.

== Decisions to reduce the size of the Navy and to administrate forfeited estates in Ireland ==
After reconvening for the second session in November 1699 Harley pressed for further budget reductions including a reduction in the size of the Navy to 7,000 men. He also wanted Irish forfeited estates, which commissioners calculated were worth £1,600,000, and which the king had granted to loyal followers, to be considered as public assets. After a stormy passage through the Lords, the supply bill eventually received royal assent on 11 April 1700.

== William III dissolves the Parliament ==
In the autumn of 1700 the king selected a new Tory dominated ministry and dissolved Parliament on 19 December.

== Notable acts passed by the Parliament ==
- Billingsgate, etc. Act 1698
- Exportation Act 1698
- Governors of Plantations Act 1698
- Piracy Act 1698
- Popery Act 1698

== See also ==
- 1698 English general election
- List of acts of the 1st session of the 4th Parliament of King William III
- List of acts of the 2nd session of the 4th Parliament of King William III
- List of parliaments of England
