= River Lark =

River in Suffolk and Cambridgeshire, England

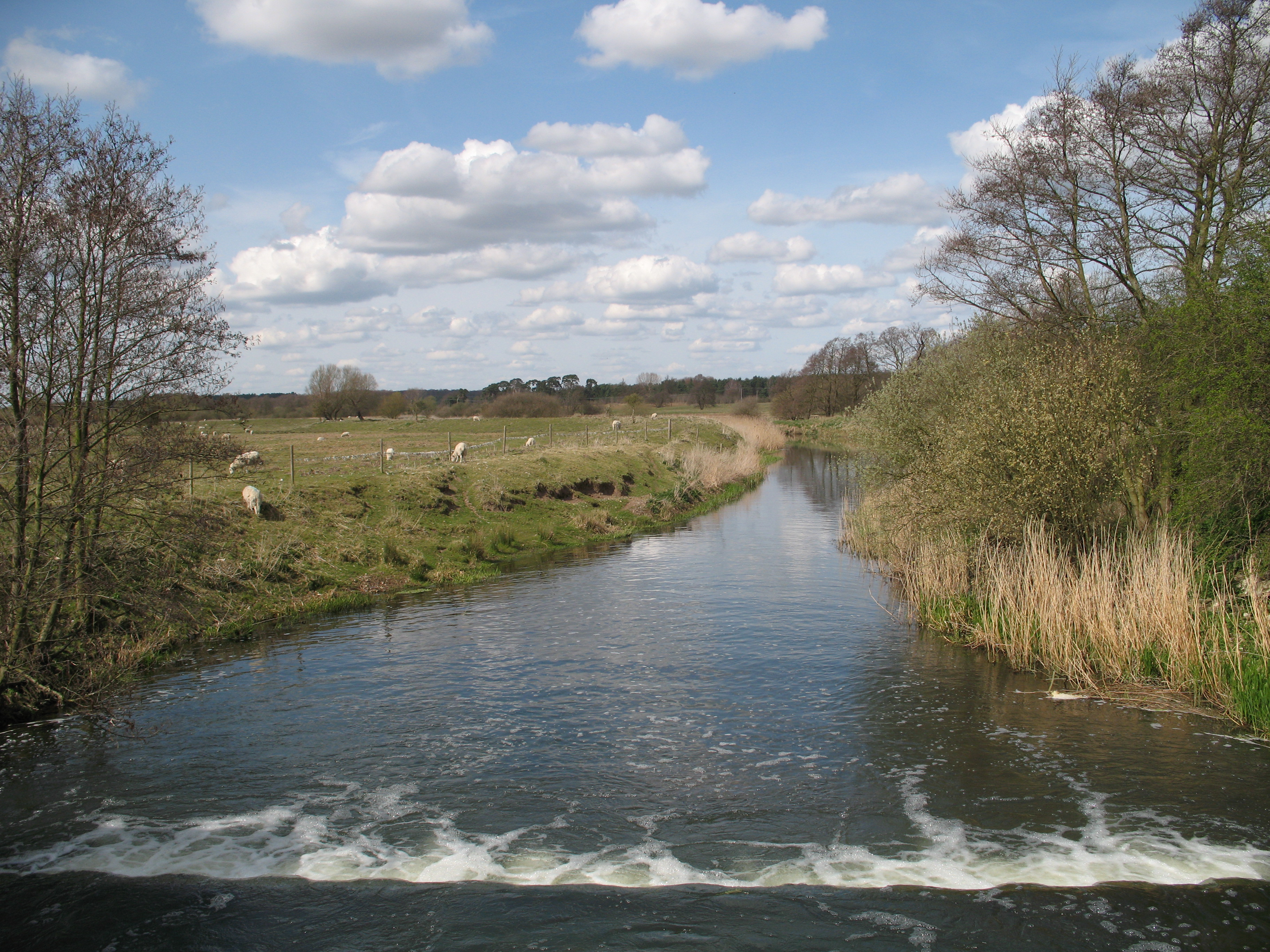
- The river near Icklingham

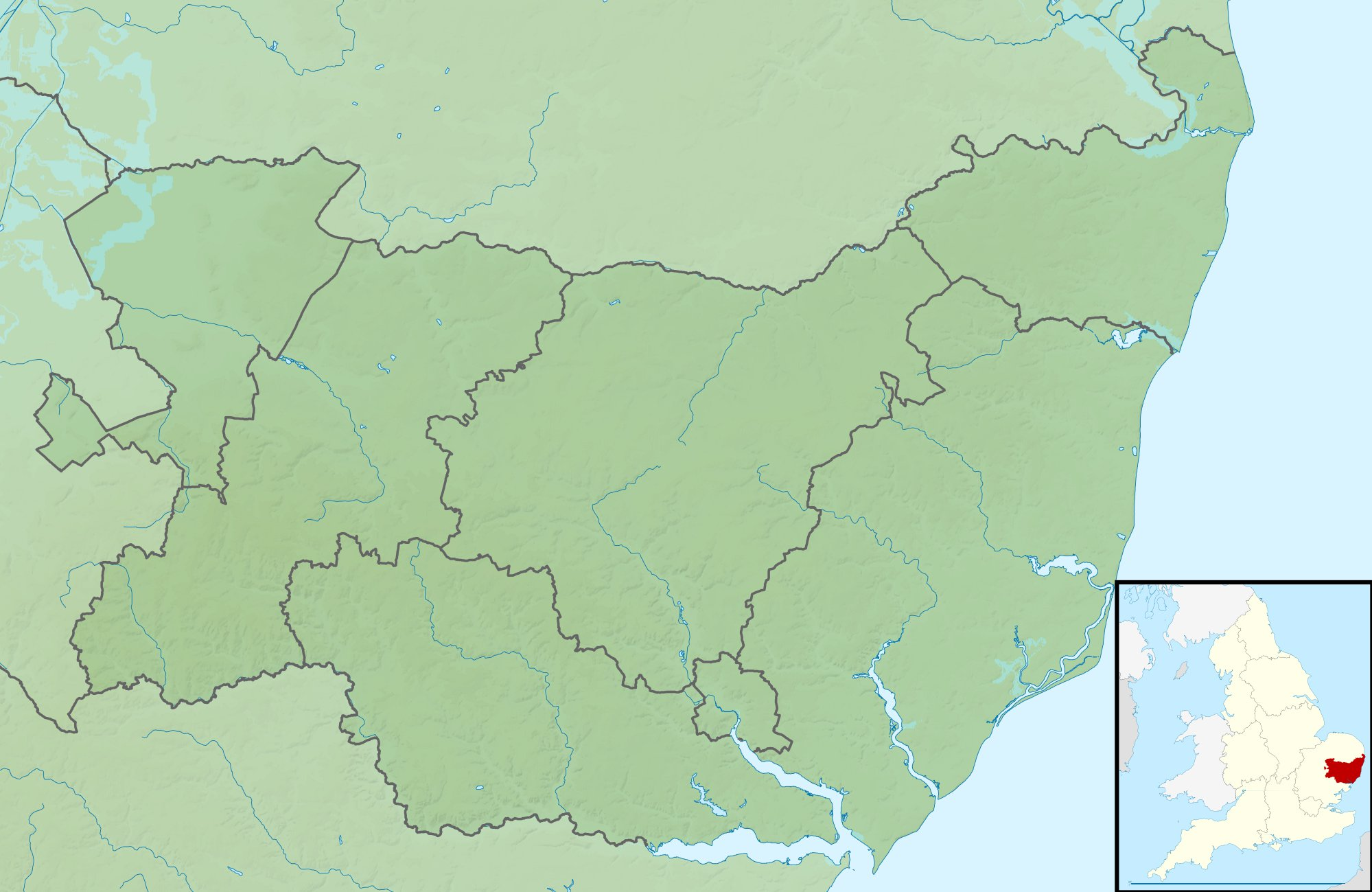
- Location of the river mouth just outside Suffolk

Location
- Country: England

Physical characteristics
- Source: Whepstead
  - coordinates: 52.1883°N 0.6525°E
  - elevation: 104 m (341 ft)
- 2nd source: Bradfield Combust
  - coordinates: 52.1775°N 0.7325°E
  - elevation: 65 m (213 ft)
- Mouth: Littleport, River Great Ouse
  - coordinates: 52.4352°N 0.3120°E
  - elevation: 0 m (0 ft)
- Length: 57 km (35 mi)

Basin features
- Tributaries
  - left: River Linnet

The River Lark crosses the border between Suffolk and Cambridgeshire in England. It is a chalk river and a tributary of the River Great Ouse, and was extended when that river was re-routed as part of drainage improvements. It is thought to have been used for navigation since Roman times, and improvements to its navigability were made in 1638 and in the early 18th century, when locks and staunches were built. Special powers to improve the river from Mildenhall to Bury St Edmunds were granted by statute (River Lark Act 1698). The upper terminus was on the northern edge of Bury St Edmunds, but a new dock was opened near the railway station after the Eastern Union Railway opened its line in 1846.

The navigation was officially abandoned in 1888, but despite this, commercial use of the river continued until 1928. Following an acquisition by the Great Ouse Catchment Board, locks at Barton Mills and Icklingham were rebuilt in the 1960s, but were isolated when the A11 road bridge was lowered soon afterward. It now has one operational lock at Isleham, and can be navigated to Jude's Ferry.

Water quality in the river was generally moderate in 2016, although there was a section where the quality was bad, the lowest rating given by the Environment Agency, who monitor English rivers. The river hosts a large population of signal crayfish, a species which has increased as the eel population has diminished.

== Course ==
Rising at Bradfield Combust, to the south of Bury St Edmunds in Suffolk, it flows through Bury, Mildenhall and Prickwillow, and joins the Great Ouse south of Littleport in Cambridgeshire. It is about 31 miles (50 km) long, of which 10.1 miles (16.3 km) is navigable.

The upper river is an important focus for prehistoric activity, particularly relating to the Neolithic enclosure at Fornham All Saints. This comprises a large causewayed enclosure, several ring features, and a long cursus.

Just above Barton Mills, a side weir connects the river to the start of the Cut-off Channel, a 28-mile (45 km) drain running from there to Denver along the south-eastern edge of the Fens, which was constructed in the 1950s and 1960s. During times of flood it carries the headwaters of the River Lark, the River Wissey and the Little Ouse to Denver Sluice on the River Great Ouse.

Below Barton Mills, the mill stream at Mildenhall marks the start of a footpath which follows the north bank of the river, passing Mildenhall Cricket Club, to Isleham, after which there are footpaths and drove roads on both sides of the river to its junction with the Great Ouse. There is a weir at King's Staunch, after which comes Jude's Ferry, the current head of navigation, where boats at least 60 feet (18 m) in length can be turned. A magnificent hoard of late Roman silver was discovered at nearby Thistley Green in 1942, and the 34 pieces, which included bowls, spoons, dishes and goblets, were declared to be Treasure trove and are now in the British Museum.

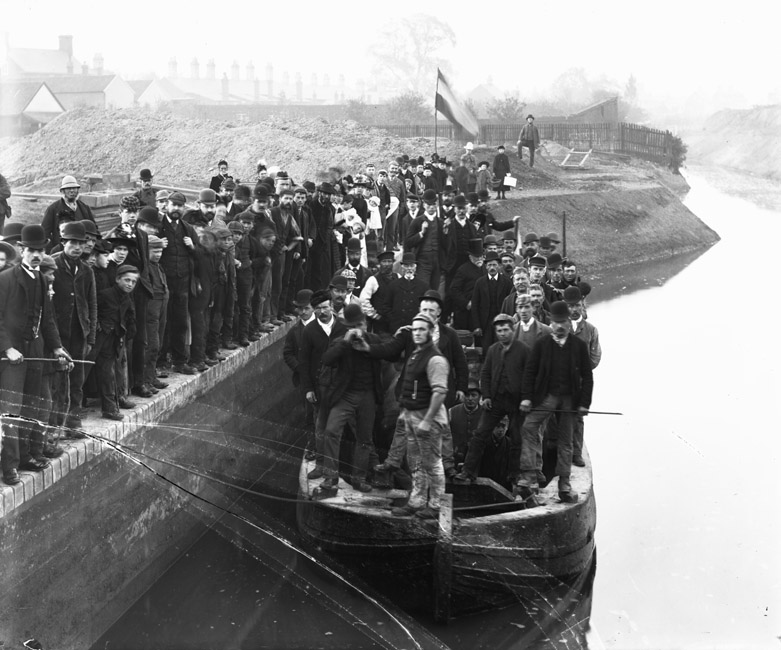
Barges on the River Lark, c. 1910

The stretch from Jude's Ferry to Isleham includes several pill-boxes, which were constructed during World War II to defend against invasion. Above the start of the lock cut is a memorial to the famous Baptist preacher Charles Spurgeon, who was baptised in the river on 3 May 1850. The site, where a chain ferry once crossed the river, and another near the weir were used for public baptisms until 1970. Isleham itself has three pubs, all dating from the 17th century, some shops and a large marina. There was an outbreak of cholera here in the 1850s, when over 500 people were "living in hollows" as a result of poverty which affected many fenland villages. In medieval times, Isleham was an important port with three quays. Remains of a Roman villa and over 6,000 Bronze-Age artefacts, which are now in the Moyse's Hall Museum at Bury St Edmunds, indicate that it has been a centre of occupation since antiquity.

From Isleham to Prickwillow, the river flows for almost 4 miles (6.4 km) in an artificial cut, thought to have been constructed by the Romans, and joined the River Great Ouse at Prickwillow until 1830. The Great Ouse was then diverted, and its old course occupied by the Lark. There are a number of pumping stations on the banks of this section, including the Lark Engine, which has been the main outlet for the drainage of the southern part of Burnt Fen since 1842. Many of the surrounding ditches once flowed into the river by gravity, but the draining of the fens has resulted in the land surface dropping, and the water must now be raised by up to 16 feet (4.9 m) from the ditches to the river. At Mile End, two pumping stations sit one above the other, indicating the progressive sinking of the land. Prickwillow is home to the Museum of Fen Pumping Engines, itself once a working pumping station, and now holding several engines which were used in the draining of the Fens.

Prickwillow vicarage also demonstrates the shrinking of the land. Its ground floor rooms were originally the cellars, and the two steps leading to the front door have been replaced by nine. Below Prickwillow, the river is crossed by the Ely to Norwich railway line. The final 0.9 miles (1.4 km) of the river's course are quite straight, as the river flows through another artificial channel. At its junction with the Great Ouse, the channel is crossed by a road which was formerly the A10, which ran along the banks of the Great Ouse at this point on its route from Ely to Littleport, but this section has been bypassed by a new alignment of the road further to the west.

== Management ==
The river is managed and maintained by the Environment Agency, from whom boat owners must obtain a licence in order to use the waterway. The Agency have designated the section from Sicklesmere through Bury St Edmunds and Fornham St Martin to Isleham as a Flood Warning Area.

== Navigation ==
The Lark is thought to have been used by the Romans for the carriage of clunch, a building material quarried from pits near Isleham, and stone for the building of Bury St Edmunds Abbey was carried to the site along the river. The first records of plans to improve the river for navigation date from 1635, when Henry Lambe sought to make it navigable from the Ouse to Bury St Edmunds. Although his plans were approved by a commission, there was local opposition, and it was December 1637 before he was granted a licence from the King to complete the work. The River Lark Act 1698 (11 Will. 3. c. 22) was passed after having been pending for several years. By 1700, the upper reaches were again in disrepair, and Henry Ashley obtained powers to improve the river from Worlington to below Mildenhall Mill, and to make it navigable from there to East Gate bridge in Bury St Edmunds. In addition to a schedule of tolls for the carriage of commodities, special provision was made so that some coal could be carried without incurring tolls, to assist the poor of Bury St Edmunds, and "gentlemen and persons of quality" did not have to pay for the use of the river by pleasure boats.

Ashley built 14 staunches and 11 sluices, the latter almost certainly referring to pound locks. In 1716, tolls amounted to £475, although the work was unfinished, and Ashley estimated that a further £800 was required to complete it. Disputes with millers were recorded in 1720 and 1722, and ownership of the navigation was disputed on Ashley's death. The Master of the Rolls gave it to Joshua and Joanna Palmer in 1742, but receipts were meagre, at around £267 per year, and the maintenance carried out was barely sufficient. Ownership had passed to their son, Ashley Palmer, by 1781, when the navigation made a profit of £274. In 1790, there were plans for a 31-mile (50 km) link from Bury St Edmunds to the River Stour at Mistley, which John Rennie surveyed, but it involved heavy engineering work, including a 2,420-yard (2,210 m) tunnel, and the estimated cost of £75,000 could not be raised. Palmer died in 1792, and the river was managed by Susanna Palmer, his widow.

River Lark Navigation Act 1817
- Act of Parliament
- Parliament of the United Kingdom
- Long title: An Act for amending and rendering more effectual an Act of His late Majesty King William the Third, for making the River Lark alias Burn navigable.
- Citation: 57 Geo. 3. c. lxxi

Dates
- Royal assent: 10 July 1817

Text of statute as originally enacted

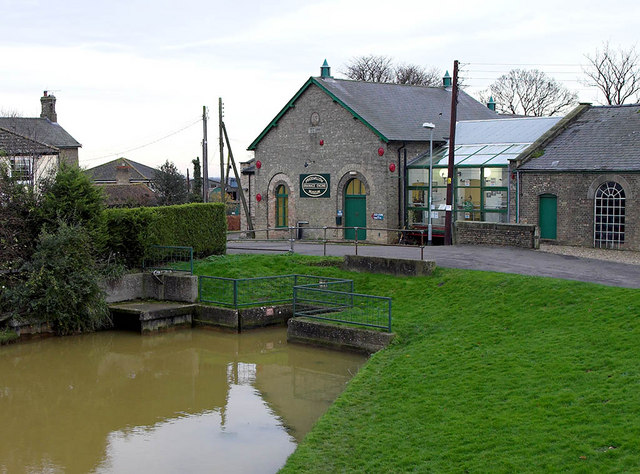
The Drainage Engine Museum at Prickwillow

The costs of maintenance were high, for in 1807 tolls of £1,348 were received, but profits were less than one third of that amount. Recognising that a large investment was needed to keep the river profitable, an attempt was made in 1817 to sell it to the Duke of Norfolk for £12,000, but this came to nothing. The original commissioners appointed under the act obtained in 1700 had failed to appoint any more commissioners, and so new commissioners were authorised by a further act of Parliament, the River Lark Navigation Act 1817 (57 Geo. 3. c. lxxi), with powers to raise the tolls to pay for the maintenance of the navigation. Little work was done, although a new lock and staunch were built at Isleham under provisions of the Eau Brink Act 1821 (1 & 2 Geo. 4. c. lxiv). The South Level Commissioners, who had been formed by the Bedford Level Drainage Act 1827 (7 & 8 Geo. 4. c. xlvii), took over control of the lower river, and re-routed it to join the new course of the Great Ouse which had been diverted into a cut to the west of its original route. Trade on the upper river was increasingly difficult, as a result of obstructions and shoals in the channel. The lighters used on the river often had to be partially unloaded at Prickwillow, to allow them to navigate the shallower sections.

Control of the river above Isleham was inherited by Sir Thomas Cullum when Susanna Palmer died. He rebuilt most of the locks and staunches in the 1830s, resulting in increased trade in coal and general merchandise which originated from Kings Lynn, but success was short lived, as the Eastern Union Railway opened a line from Ipswich to Bury St Edmunds in 1846, and decline was immediate. In the 1850s, with the Fornham to Bury section impassible, the Bury St Edmunds Navigation Company proposed a scheme to reopen the river to Bury railway station. Their prospectus stated that the Eastern Union Railway had been managing the river for seven years, but little changed, as they failed to raise a working capital of £20,000, and by the 1860s, the route above Mildenhall was ruined.

Abandonment of the river as a navigation was authorised by the Railway and Canal Traffic Act 1888. The River Arun in West Sussex was the only other river abandoned by this act. Despite this, the Eastern Counties Navigation and Transport Co Ltd bought the river from Lee Brook to Bury St Edmunds in 1890, made Tuddenham Mill Stream navigable, repaired locks and staunches on the main river, and re-opened it in September 1894. The company was bankrupt by December, and the Icklingham to Bury St Edmunds section closed again. Some trading continued on the lower reaches, but commercial carrying ceased after 1928. Ownership of the river passed to the Great Ouse Catchment Board with the passing of the Land Drainage Act 1930. They rebuilt Barton Mills and Icklingham locks in the 1960s, but the bridge carrying the A11 road at Barton Mills was lowered soon afterward, and the present head of navigation is at Jude's Ferry.

== Ecology ==
The Environment Agency assesses the water quality within the river systems in England. Each is given an overall ecological status, which may be one of five levels: high, good, moderate, poor and bad. There are several components that are used to determine this, including biological status, which looks at the quantity and varieties of invertebrates, angiosperms and fish. Chemical status, which compares the concentrations of various chemicals against known safe concentrations, is rated good or fail.

The water quality of the River Lark system was as follows in 2019.

| Section | Ecological status | Chemical status | Length | Catchment | Channel |
|---|---|---|---|---|---|
| Lark (US Hawstead) | Moderate | Fail | 2.8 miles (4.5 km) | 5.79 square miles (15.0 km^{2}) | |
| Lark (Hawstead to Abbey Gardens) | Bad | Fail | 4.1 miles (6.6 km) | 11.24 square miles (29.1 km^{2}) | heavily modified |
| Lark (Abbey Gardens to Mildenhall) | Moderate | Fail | 14.1 miles (22.7 km) | 33.60 square miles (87.0 km^{2}) | heavily modified |
| Lark downstream of Mill Street Bridge | Moderate | Fail | 3.4 miles (5.5 km) | 8.21 square miles (21.3 km^{2}) | heavily modified |
| Ely Ouse (South Level) | Moderate | Fail | 54.5 miles (87.7 km) | 180.02 square miles (466.2 km^{2}) | artificial |

Separate figures for the Lark downstream of Isleham are not available, and the final row covers the lower section of the Lark, parts of the River Great Ouse and a number of its other tributaries. The Hawstead to Abbey Gardens section deteriorated from poor quality in 2015 to bad in 2016. The Environment Agency have set a target for ensuring it is moderate by 2027. Like most rivers in the UK, the chemical status changed from good to fail in 2019, due to the presence of polybrominated diphenyl ethers (PBDE) and perfluorooctane sulphonate (PFOS), neither of which had previously been included in the assessment.

The river hosts a large population of the invasive species, the signal crayfish. A study published in 2011 identified the decline in eels, which predate the crayfish, as the major factor in their dramatic increase.

== Points of interest ==
| Point | Coordinates (Links to map resources) | OS Grid Ref | Notes |
|---|---|---|---|
| Jn with River Great Ouse | 52.4351°N 0.3122°E | TL572844 | |
| Museum of Fen Pumping Engines | 52.4164°N 0.3478°E | TL597824 | |
| Isleham Lock | 52.3576°N 0.4198°E | TL648760 | |
| Judes Ferry Bridge | 52.3457°N 0.4606°E | TL677748 | Head of navigation |
| Barton Mills Lock | 52.3397°N 0.5088°E | TL710742 | |
| Mildenhall Lock | 52.3357°N 0.5321°E | TL726738 | |
| Start of Cut-off Channel | 52.3355°N 0.5395°E | TL731738 | |
| Icklingham Lock | 52.3256°N 0.5951°E | TL769728 | |
| Chimney Mill Lock | 52.2966°N 0.6696°E | TL821698 | |
| Fornham Dock | 52.2653°N 0.7076°E | TL848664 | original terminus |
| Northgate Dock | 52.2539°N 0.7166°E | TL855652 | 1850s terminus |
| Source near Bradfield Combust | 52.1739°N 0.7327°E | TL869563 | spring |

There is a second, much shorter, River Lark also in Suffolk which flows into the River Deben at Martlesham.

== See also ==
- Rivers of the United Kingdom

== Bibliography ==
- Beckett, John (1983). The Urgent Hour. Ely Local History Publication Board. ISBN 978-0-904463-88-0.
- Blair, Andrew Hunter (2006). The River Great Ouse and tributaries. Imray Laurie Norie and Wilson. ISBN 978-0-85288-943-5.
- Boyes, John; Russell, Ronald (1977). The Canals of Eastern England. David and Charles. ISBN 978-0-7153-7415-3.
- Longshaw, Matt; Stebbing, Paul, eds. (2016). Biology and Ecology of Crayfish. CRC Press. ISBN 978-1-4987-6732-3.
- Thirsk, Joan (2002). Rural England. Oxford University Press. ISBN 978-0-19-860619-2.
