= Trial of Lord George Gordon =

Treason trial in 18th century

Lord George Gordon, the defendant

The trial of Lord George Gordon for high treason occurred on 5 February 1781 before Lord Mansfield in the Court of King's Bench, as a result of Gordon's role in the Gordon Riots. Gordon, President of the Protestant Association, had led a protest against the Papists Act 1778, a Catholic emancipation bill. Intending only to hand in a petition to Parliament, Gordon riled the crowd by postponing of the petition, denouncing Members of Parliament and launching "anti-Catholic harangues". The crowd of protesters fragmented and began looting nearby buildings; by the time the riots had finished a week later, 300 had died. Gordon was almost immediately arrested, and indicted for levying war against the King.

Defended by Thomas Erskine and Lloyd Kenyon, Gordon was accidentally assisted by the Attorney General James Wallace, who managed to "ridicule" some of his own evidence before Gordon was set back by Kenyon's lacklustre and confusing speech. However, an impassioned speech by Erskine, which argued that Gordon's actions were only crimes under the illegally extended law of constructive treason, led to the jury finding him not guilty. This result, which met with pleasure due to the popular disquiet with the idea of constructive treason, left juries unwilling to apply the extended law of constructive treason; as a result, the government was forced to incorporate it into statute law. Erskine became renowned as an excellent, albeit unorthodox, advocate; Gordon, on the other hand, was later excommunicated and imprisoned, dying in jail in 1793. Kenyon was chosen to replace Wallace as Attorney General at the next change of ministry.

== Background ==
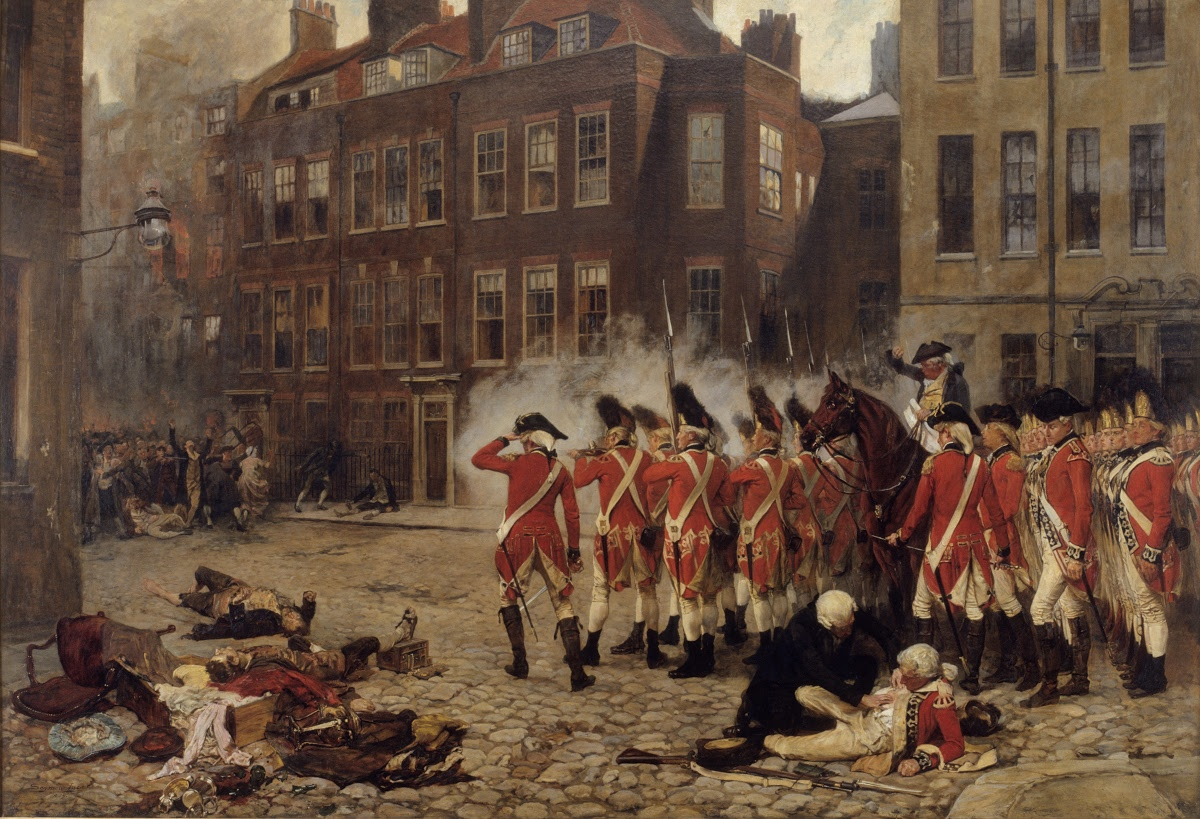
The Gordon Riots John Seymour Lucas, an 1879 painting depicting the Gordon Riots.

Lord George Gordon, third and youngest son of the third duke of Gordon, and brother of the fourth duke, an "ignorant young nobleman, almost simple-minded in his attitude to Catholics", was the President of the Protestant Association. This body was dedicated to the repeal of the Papists Act 1778, a Roman Catholic relief bill. Prior to the passage of the Act, Catholics were legally forbidden from voting, inheriting land, saying Mass, serving in public office or academia, bearing arms or serving in the military, although these prohibitions were frequently overlooked, particularly those regarding military enlistment. The 1778 Act explicitly removed the bans on saying Mass, land inheritance or academic standing, and involved several other implicit concessions, made to encourage Catholics to serve in the military. This was made necessary by the ongoing course of the American Revolution, which was going poorly for British forces – it was felt that Catholic relief would both directly strengthen the armed forces and prevent the repeat of revolution in Ireland, a mostly Catholic nation, which politicians thought a distinct possibility given their "trade grievances and troubled politics".

On 2 June 1780, approximately 60,000 people gathered in St George's Fields, London, to hear an address from Gordon. He and the mob were there to hand in a petition to Parliament (of which he was a Member) decrying the Papists Act. After marching to Parliament and reassembling, the mob became incensed by a declaration from Gordon that consideration of the petition was to be postponed, and fragmented. Gordon himself encouraged the crowd with "anti-Catholic harangues", denouncing approaching Members of Parliament, and groups began destroying and looting Catholic buildings or buildings owned by those they alleged to support Catholic relief. Several Members of Parliament were attacked, the house of Lord Chief Justice Lord Mansfield was destroyed, and several prisons were broken into. At least 300 died in the week it took the military to quash the riots; Emma Mason writes that more property was damaged during this week than in the entire French Revolution. 450 were arrested, including Gordon himself, who was charged with high treason. His indictment stated that he "most wickedly, maliciously, and traitorously did ordain, prepare, and levy public war against our said lord, the King".

== Trial ==
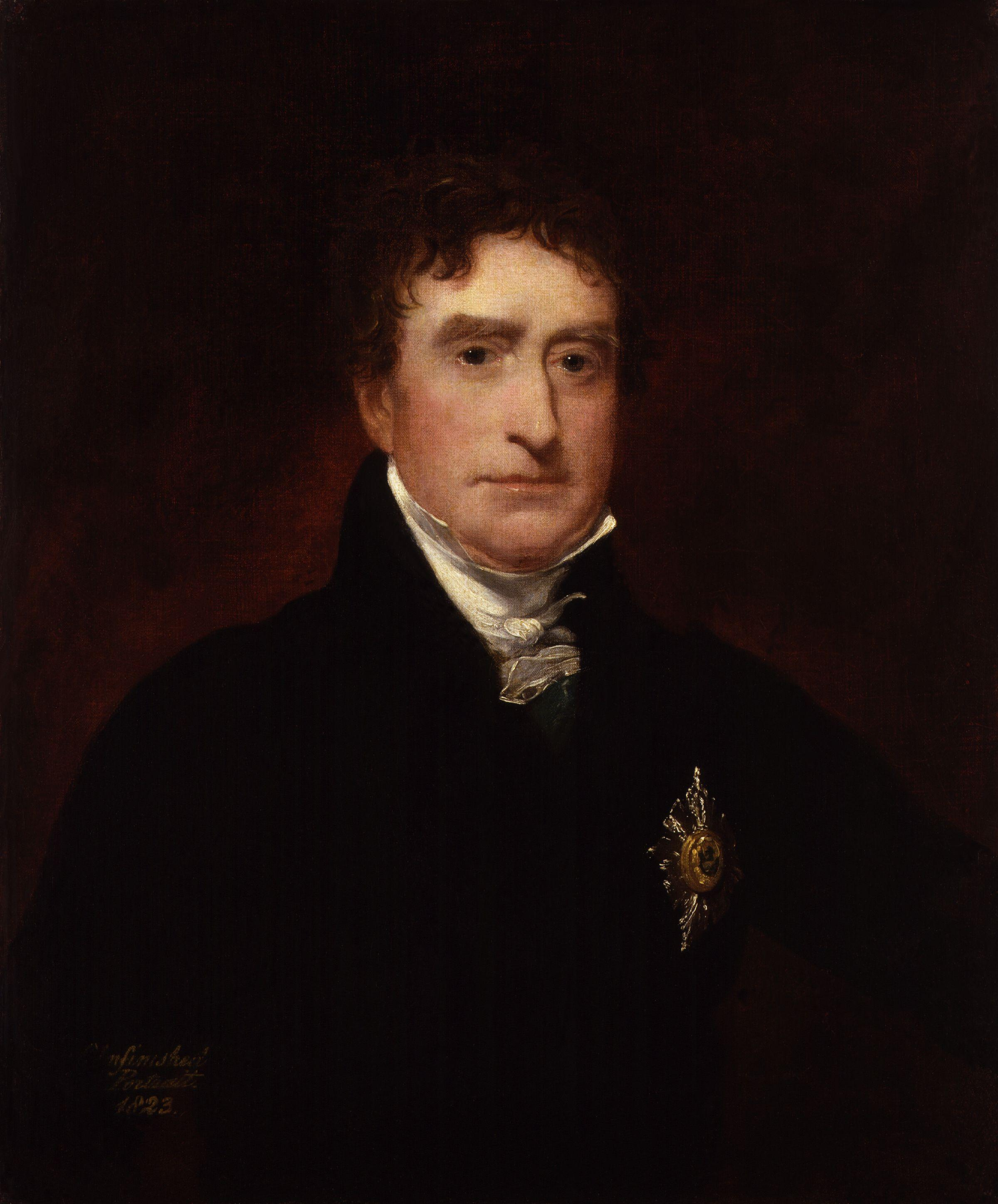
Thomas Erskine, whose speech led to Gordon being acquitted.

Gordon retained two barristers for his defence, Thomas Erskine and Lloyd Kenyon, and was arraigned by the Attorney General before Lord Mansfield in the Court of King's Bench on 5 February 1781, pleading not guilty. The Attorney General opened, managing to accidentally reduce the evidence of some of his own witnesses to ridicule; this was offset by Kenyon's confusing and poor speech in Gordon's defence. Kenyon, an equity barrister with little experience of public speaking, was noted as "a curious choice for the defence", and seeing the reaction of the jury to his speech, Erskine asked for leave to delay giving his speech, which was granted.

Following the testimony of 12 witnesses, who stated that Gordon was of excellent character and was loyal to both the king and the constitution, Erskine rose, and instead of arguing that Gordon had not been involved instead took the line that his crimes did not constitute treason. High treason was at the time still based on the Treason Act 1351, which mandated that the definition of treason could not be extended by judges. Notwithstanding this, the judiciary had extended this to include constructive treason. Erskine was successful in showing that Gordon's motives had only been to defend his nation, not to harm it, and that without the intention to commit treason, no treason could be committed. The Treason Act 1351 required the act to be treasonous in nature, not in consequence, and Gordon's crimes fell into the second category.

Erskine's speech was replied to by the Solicitor General, James Mansfield, and the summing-up by Lord Mansfield was not favorable to Gordon. However, Erskine's reasoning carried the day with the jury, who found Lord George not guilty.

== Aftermath ==
The verdict was received with pleasure by the majority of the populace, with the principle of constructive treason "widely regarded as highly threatening and injurious to public freedoms". As a result, juries became far less willing to convict people for constructive treason. The government resorted to amending the Treason Act to incorporate the judicially invented concept of constructive treason into statute law.

Erskine's speech, more than anything else, is considered to be the source of this acquittal. Lloyd Paul Stryker in his biography of Erskine notes that he "had held his jury spellbound-not the jury only, but the whole courtroom also. His logic, his sincerity, and his fire had driven in his close-knit arguments with hammer blows".

Erskine later became Lord Chancellor in the Ministry of All the Talents and was renowned as an excellent, albeit unorthodox, advocate. Kenyon, on the other hand, became Lord Chief Justice. Gordon, the defendant in the case, had a less successful subsequent career. He was later excommunicated and sent to prison, where he died of typhoid in 1793.

== Bibliography ==
- Campbell, John (1847). The Lives of the Lord Chancellors and Keepers of the Great Seal of England, from the earliest times till the reign of George IV. Vol. 6. J. Murray. OCLC 652282923.
- Campbell, John (2006). The Lives of the Chief Justices of England: From the Norman Conquest till the death of Lord Tenterden. Vol. 3. Elibron Classics. ISBN 0-543-95981-3.
- Donovan, Robert Kent (1985). "The Military Origins of the Catholic Relief Programme of 1778". The Historical Journal. 28 (1). Cambridge University Press. doi:10.1017/S0018246X00002223. ISSN 0018-246X.
- Hibbert, Christopher (1990). King Mob: The Story of Lord George Gordon and the Riots of 1780. Dorset Press. ISBN 0-88029-399-3.
- Hibbert, Christopher (2000). George III: A Personal History. Basic Books. ISBN 0-465-02723-7.
- Hostettler, John (2010). Thomas Erskine and Trial by Jury (2nd ed.). Waterside Press. ISBN 978-1-904380-59-7.
- Mason, Emma (2010). The Cambridge Introduction to William Wordsworth. Cambridge University Press. ISBN 978-0-521-72147-9.
- Rude, George F.E. (1956). "The Gordon Riots: a Study of the Rioters and their Victims". Transactions of the Royal Historical Society. 6 (1). Royal Historical Society: 93–114. doi:10.2307/3678842. ISSN 0080-4401. JSTOR 3678842.
- Stryker, Lloyd Paul (1947). For the Defence: Thomas Erskine, The Most Enlightened Liberal Of His Times, 1750–1823. Doubleday. OCLC 464757150.
