= Brackley Kennett =

British merchant

Brackley Kennett was a British merchant who served as Sheriff of London in 1765 and Lord Mayor of London from 1779 to 1780. During his time in office the Gordon Riots broke out and his response to the rioting proved controversial. He failed to read the Riot Act, or to offer additional protection to threatened communities, and it was even alleged that he was broadly sympathetic to the rioters.

In 1781 Kennett was convicted of criminal negligence for his conduct during the Riots and fined £1,000.

== Bibliography ==
- Babington, Anthony. Military intervention in Britain: from the Gordon riots to the Gibraltar Incident. Routledge, 1990.
- Hibbert, Christopher King Mob: The Story of Lord George Gordon and the Riots of 1780. Dorset Press
