= George Walker (novelist) =

English novelist

George Walker (24 December 1772 – 8 February 1847) was an English gothic novelist and publisher.

== Life ==
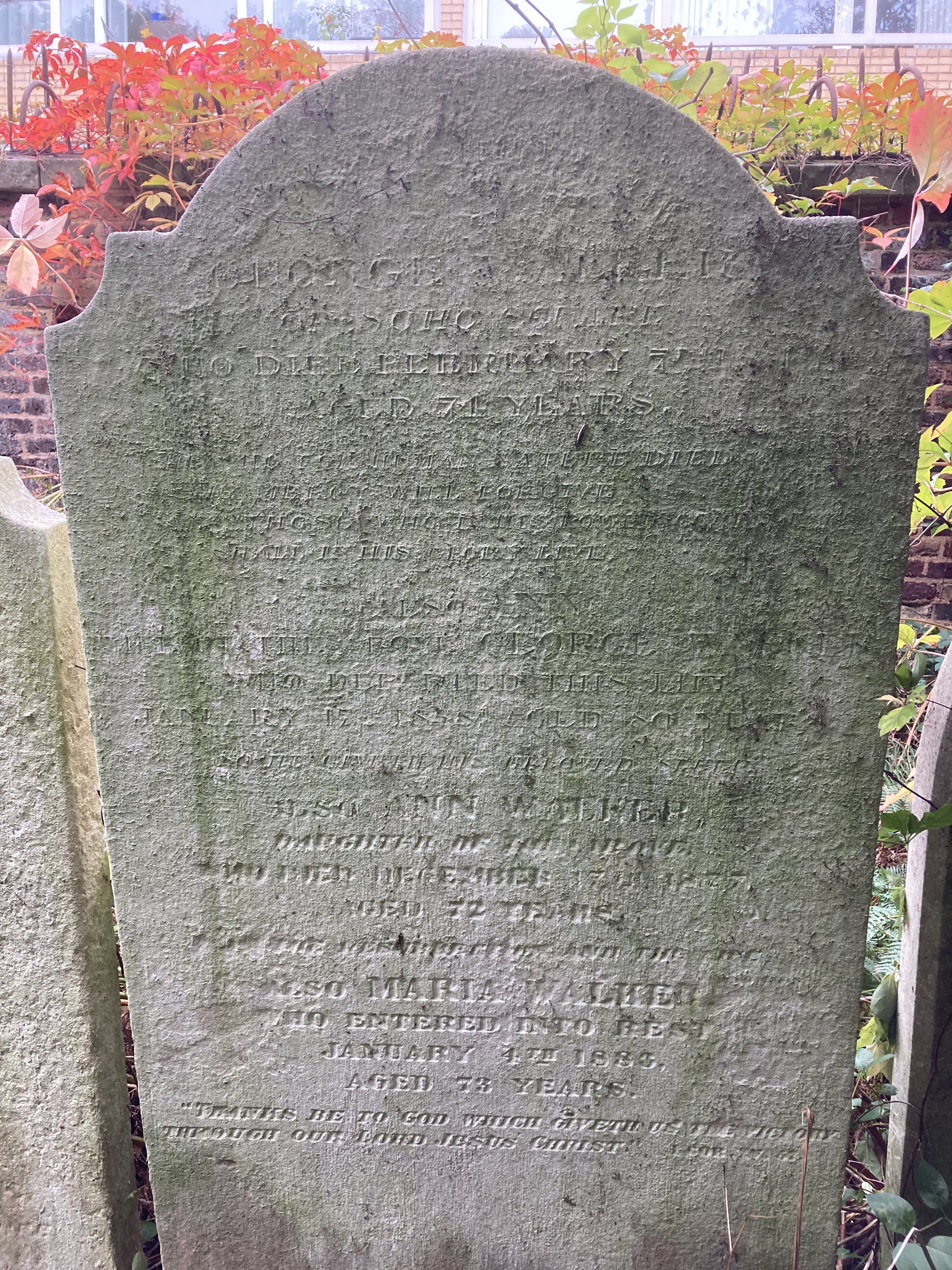
Grave of George Walker in Highgate Cemetery

He was born in Falcon Square, Cripplegate, London, England. He worked as a bookseller and music publisher, a business his son George (1803–1879) also joined. His writings were anti-reform, reacting against writers such as William Godwin and Thomas Holcroft.

He died on 8 February 1847 and was buried on the western side of Highgate Cemetery.

== The Vagabond (1799) ==
Walker's anti-Jacobin novel, The Vagabond: A Novel (1799) anachronistically sets the Gordon Riots of 1780 amidst the political events of the late 1790s. After attending a lecture by "Citizen Ego", a character based on John Thelwall, the narrator unwittingly becomes a prominent figure in the riots. Inverting radical accounts of the significance of the riots, The Vagabond portrays them as solely destructive and acquisitive. Later, the hero's mentor, Stupeo, based on William Godwin, attempts to establish a pantisocratic community in the American wilderness, but is captured and burned at the stake by Native Americans.

In the novel's dedication, Walker describes the novel as "an attempt to parry the Enemy with their own weapons" and to undermine radicalism's political romance". Literary critic Ian Haywood reads The Vagabond as evidence that the Gordon Riots "still exerted a powerful hold on popular memory" at the time of its publication.

== Books ==
- The Romance of the Cavern, 1792
- The Haunted Castle, 1794
- The House of Tinian, 1795
- Theodore Cyphon, or The Benevolent Jew, 1796
- Cynthelia, or a Woman of Ten Thousand, 1797
- The Vagabond, 1799
- The Three Spaniards, 1800
- Poems on Various Subjects, 1801
- Don Raphael, 1803
- Two Girls of Eighteen, 1806
- The Travels of Sylvester Tramper in Africa, 1813
- The Adventures of Timothy Thoughtless, 1813 (for children)
- The Battle of Waterloo, A Poem, 1815
