= River Lark Act 1698 =

Act of the Parliament of England

- Act of Parliament
- Parliament of England
- Long title: An Act for makeing the River Larke alias Burn Navigable.
- Citation: 11 Will. 3 c. 22 (Note: This is the citation in The Statutes of the Realm.); 11 & 12 Will. 3. c. 22 (Note: This is the citation in The Statutes at Large.)
- Territorial extent: England and Wales

Dates
- Royal assent: 11 April 1700
- Commencement: 16 November 1699 (Note: Start of session.)

Status: Current legislation

Text of statute as originally enacted

The River Lark Act 1698 (11 Will. 3. c. 22) is an act of the Parliament of England to facilitate making the River Lark navigable from Bury St Edmunds to Mildenhall in Suffolk.

The act empowered Henry Ashley (junior) of Eaton Socon to improve the river to make it navigable from Long Common, through Mildenhall to East-gate Bridge in Bury St Edmunds.
