= 1698 English general election =

General election in England

- 19 July – 10 August 1698

All 513 seats in the House of Commons 257 seats needed for a majority
	First party	Second party
Party	Whig	Tory
Seats won	246	208
Seat change	▼11	▲5
- Composition of the House of Commons after the election

After the conclusion of the 1698 English general election the government led by the Whig Junto believed it had held its ground against the opposition. Over the previous few years, divisions had emerged within the Whig party between the 'court' supporters of the junto and the 'country' faction, who disliked the royal prerogative, were concerned about governmental corruption, and opposed a standing army. Some contests were therefore between candidates representing 'court' and 'country', rather than Whig and Tory. The Whigs made gains in the counties and in small boroughs, but not in the larger urban constituencies. After Parliament was dissolved on 7 July 1698, voting began on 19 July 1698 and continued until 10 August, with an order directing the new House of Commons to meet on 24 August 1698.

Increasingly, however, the Tories and the country Whigs managed to wear down the government's resolve and win over dissident Whig MPs. After 1699, the junto ministry gradually disintegrated to be replaced by a largely Tory government, which was securely in power by the autumn of 1700.

Party strengths are an approximation, with the allegiance of many MPs being unknown.

== Summary of the constituencies ==
English Parliament of General Election 1698

See 1796 British general election for details. The constituencies used in England and Wales were the same throughout the period. In 1707 alone the 45 Scottish members were not elected from the constituencies, but were returned by co-option of a part of the membership of the last Parliament of Scotland elected before the Union.

== See also ==
- 4th Parliament of King William III
- List of parliaments of England
