= Papists Act 1778 =

Act of the Parliament of Great Britain

- Act of Parliament
- Parliament of Great Britain
- Long title: An Act for relieving His Majesty's subjects professing the popish religion from certain penalties and disabilities imposed on them by an Act made in the eleventh and twelfth years of the reign of King William the Third, intituled "An Act for the further preventing the growth of popery."
- Citation: 18 Geo. 3. c. 60
- Introduced by: Lord North (Lords)
- Territorial extent: Great Britain

Dates
- Royal assent: 3 June 1778
- Commencement: 20 November 1777 (Note: Start of session.)
- Repealed: 13 July 1871
Other legislation
Amends	Popery Act 1698
Amended by	Religious Disabilities Act 1846
Repealed by	Promissory Oaths Act 1871

Status: Repealed

Text of statute as originally enacted

Leases for Lives Act 1777
- Act of Parliament
- Parliament of Ireland
- Long title: An Act for the Relief of His Majesty's Subjects of this Kingdom professing the Popish Religion.
- Citation: 17 & 18 Geo. 3. c. 49 (I)
- Territorial extent: Ireland

Dates
- Royal assent: 14 August 1778
- Commencement: 1 August 1778 (Note: Section 1.)
Other legislation
Amends	Popery Act 1703
Amended by	Religious Disabilities Act 1846; Promissory Oaths Act 1871; Statute Law Revision (Ireland) Act 1879
Relates to	Popery Act 1709

Status: Amended

Text of statute as originally enacted

The Papists Act 1778 (18 Geo. 3. c. 60), also known as Sir George Savile's Act, the First Relief Act, or the Catholic Relief Act 1778 was an act of the Parliament of Great Britain. The act was the first act for Roman Catholic relief. Later in 1778 it was also enacted by the Parliament of Ireland as the Leases for Lives Act 1777 (17 & 18 Geo. 3. c. 49 (I)), also known as Gardiner's Act or the Catholic Relief Act 1777.

Before the act, a number of "Penal laws" had been enacted in Britain, which varied between the jurisdictions from time to time but effectively excluded those known to be Roman Catholics from public life. The timing of the act was partly based on the fact that the Papacy had stopped recognising the Jacobite cause on the death of the "Old Pretender" in 1766, and also the possibility that the ongoing American rebellion of 1775 might inspire a rebellion by Catholics in the Kingdom of Ireland.

== Effect of the act ==
By this act, an oath was imposed, which besides a declaration of loyalty to the reigning sovereign, contained an abjuration of the Pretender, and of certain doctrines attributed to Roman Catholics, such as that excommunicated princes may lawfully be murdered, that no faith should be kept with heretics, and that the Pope had any temporal or spiritual jurisdiction in Great Britain.

Those taking this oath were exempted from some of the provisions of the Popery Act 1698 (11 Will. 3. c. 4). Although it did not grant freedom of worship, it allowed Catholics to join the army and purchase land if they took an oath of allegiance. The section as to taking and prosecuting priests was repealed, as well as the penalty of perpetual imprisonment for keeping a school. Roman Catholics were also enabled to inherit and purchase land, nor was an heir who conformed to the Established church any longer empowered to enter and enjoy the estate of his "papist" kinsman.

The passing of this act was the occasion of the Gordon Riots (1780) in which the violence of the mob was especially directed against Lord Mansfield, who had objected to various prosecutions under the statutes now repealed.

== Subsequent developments ==
Section 5 of the act as enacts "that nothing in this Act contained shall extend or be construed to extend to any Popish Bishop, Priest, Jesuit, or Schoolmaster who shall not have taken and subscribed the above Oath in the above Words before he shall have been apprehended, or any Prosecution commenced against him" was repealed by section 1 of the Religious Disabilities Act 1846 (9 & 10 Vict. c. 59), which came into force on 18 August 1846.

The whole act was repealed by section 1 of, and part I of schedule one to, the Promissory Oaths Act 1871 (34 & 35 Vict. c. 48), which came into force on 13 July 1871.

== See also ==
- Catholic Emancipation
- Roman Catholic Relief Act 1791 (31 Geo. 3. c. 32)
- Roman Catholic Relief Act 1829 (10 Geo. 4. c. 7)

== Bibliography ==
- R. F. Foster (1988). Modern Ireland, 1600-1972 (paperback 1990 ed.). New York: Viking. pp. 244–245. ISBN 978-0-14-012510-8.
