= Governors of Plantations Act 1698 =

Act of the Parliament of England

- Act of Parliament
- Parliament of England
- Long title: An Act to punish Governors of Plantations in this Kingdom for crimes by them committed in the Plantations
- Citation: 11 Will. 3 c. 12 (Note: This is the citation in The Statutes of the Realm.); 11 & 12 Will. 3. c. 12 (Note: This is the citation in The Statutes at Large.)
- Territorial extent: England and Wales

Dates
- Royal assent: 11 April 1700
- Commencement: 1 August 1700 (Note: Section 1.)
- Repealed: 8 November 1995
Other legislation
Amended by	Criminal Justice Act 1948
Repealed by	Statute Law (Repeals) Act 1995

Status: Repealed

Text of statute as originally enacted

Revised text of statute as amended

Text of the Act 11 Will. 3 as in force today (including any amendments) within the United Kingdom, from legislation.gov.uk.

The Governors of Plantations Act 1698 (11 Will. 3. c. 12) formally titled "An Act to punish Governors of Plantations in this Kingdom for crimes by them committed in the Plantations" was an act of the Parliament of England passed during the reign of William III of England.

It is the earliest English or British legislation by which Crown servants, including diplomats and governors, could be punished under English law for offences committed abroad. A notable prosecution under the act was in the case of R v Wall in which Joseph Wall, the former governor of Gorée, was hanged for causing the death of a soldier following an illegal flogging 20 years previously.

== Subsequent developments ==
The whole act was repealed by section 1 of, and part II of schedule 1 to, the Statute Law (Repeals) Act 1995, which came into force on 8 November 1995.
