= Constructive treason =

Constructive treason is the judicial extension of the statutory definition of the crime of treason. For example, the English Treason Act 1351 declares it to be treason "When a Man doth compass or imagine the Death of our Lord the King". This was subsequently interpreted by the courts to include imprisoning the king, on the ground that history had shown that when a king is held captive by a usurper, he often dies in captivity. Despite legislative efforts to restrict the scope of treason, judges and prosecutors in common law jurisdictions still succeeded in broadening the reach of the offence by "constructing" new treasons. It is the opinion of one legal historian that:

The word "constructive" is one of the law's most useful frauds. It implies substance where none exists. There can be constructive contracts, constructive trusts, constructive fraud, constructive intent, constructive possession, and constructive anything else the law chooses to baptize as such. "Constructive" in this sense means "treated as". ... Constructive treason wasn't "real" treason but a vaguely defined, less potent category of conduct that the court deciding the particular case felt should be "treated as" treason. It was the perfect instrument of oppression, being virtually whatever the authorities wanted it to be.

== England and Great Britain ==
Ironically, the first attempt to constrain the development of constructive treasons in England was the 1351 Act itself. Its preamble states that Parliament had decided to define treason by statute for the first time because the common law definition had expanded so widely (however this had not been constructive treason, since until 1351 treason had always been defined by judges, not by legislation). The Act ended with a clause which prohibited further judicial development of the offence:

And because that many other like Cases of Treason may happen in Time to come, which a Man cannot think nor declare at this present Time; it is accorded, That if any other Case, supposed Treason, which is not above specified, doth happen before any Justices, the Justices shall tarry without any going to Judgement of the Treason till the Cause be shewed and declared before the King and his Parliament, whether it ought to be judged Treason or other Felony.

As noted above, this was not entirely successful. From the seventeenth century, English courts refined and extended the law of treason, tolerated by Parliament, which sometimes even enshrined these new constructive treasons in new statutes – imprisoning the king became written into the Treason Acts of 1661 and 1795. By the nineteenth century, however, Parliament had established itself as the main source of new crimes, as the volume of legislation increased, and the ancient common law tradition of judges creating new crimes fell into disuse.

== United States ==
The United States inherited the English common law from the British Empire, and the Founding Fathers recognised the danger of what James Madison called "new-fangled and artificial treasons". Therefore, they intentionally drafted the treason clause of the US Constitution narrowly:

Treason against the United States, shall consist only in levying War against them, or in adhering to their Enemies, giving them Aid and Comfort.

This avoided vague words like "compassing or imagining" which had given British judges and lawyers such latitude. The words "giving them aid and comfort" were added by the Committee of Detail to further narrow the definition of treason. This was done not only to prevent judges from constructing new treasons, but also to prevent Congress from enacting new ones.

The constitutional definition did not immediately deter prosecutors from attempting to prosecute for levying war people who had not directly done so. However, the Supreme Court resisted efforts to construe the definition more widely than its text appeared to allow. In Ex parte Bollman (1807) the Supreme Court rejected arguments by prosecutors to the effect that enlisting an army of men against the United States could amount to levying war before they actually assembled. Chief Justice Marshall held: "The mere enlisting of men, without assembling them, is not levying war." In United States v. Burr the Court held that mere intent to commit treason was not sufficient either. Subsequent cases have concentrated on evidential requirements for proving treason, rather than definitions of substantive crimes.

Another example appears in Cramer v. United States (1945), which dealt with Section 1 of the Criminal Code:

Whoever, owing allegiance to the United States, levies war against them or adheres to their enemies, giving them aid and comfort within the United States or elsewhere, is guilty of treason.

This eventually ended with the clarification of the United States definition of treason.

A citizen intellectually or emotionally may favor the enemy and harbor sympathies or convictions disloyal to this country's policy or interest, but, so long as he commits no act of aid and comfort to the enemy, there is no treason. On the other hand, a citizen may take actions which do aid and comfort the enemy—making a speech critical of the government or opposing its measures, profiteering, striking in defense plants or essential work, and the hundred other things which impair our cohesion and diminish our strength—but if there is no adherence to the enemy in this, if there is no intent to betray, there is no treason.

== See also ==
- Trial of Lord George Gordon
- Cramer v. United States
