= Popery Act 1698 =

Act of the Parliament of England

- Act of Parliament
- Parliament of England
- Long title: An Act for the further preventing the Growth of Popery.
- Citation: 11 Will. 3. c. 4 (Note: This is the citation in The Statutes of the Realm.); 11 & 12 Will. 3. c. 4 (Note: This is the citation in The Statutes at Large.)
- Territorial extent: England and Wales

Dates
- Royal assent: 11 April 1700
- Commencement: 26 March 1700 (Note: Section 1.)
- Repealed: 18 August 1846
Other legislation
Amended by	Papists Act 1778
Repealed by	Religious Disabilities Act 1846

Status: Repealed

Text of statute as originally enacted

The Popery Act 1698 (11 Will. 3. c. 4) was an act of the Parliament of England enacted in 1700. The long title of the Act was "An Act for the further preventing the Growth of Popery".

Section I of the act was intended to address an alleged recent growth of Roman Catholicism by ensuring the existing anti-Catholic laws were more strongly applied. To that end, the section provided that any person who apprehended a "Popish Bishop, Priest or Jesuite" who was then prosecuted for "saying Mass or exerciseing any other Part of the Office or Function of a Popish Bishop or Priest within these Realmes" would receive £100 from the Sheriff of that county within four months of the priest's conviction. In effect, it placed a bounty on Roman Catholic priests.

Section II of the act provided for the Treasury to reimburse Sheriffs for money expended on such payments.

Section III of the act, expanding on the existing legislation, enacted that if a Catholic priest celebrated Mass, etc., as above, or if any Catholic clergyman or layperson ran a school or "take upon themselves the Education or Government or Boarding of Youth"; he was on conviction liable to "perpetuall Imprisonment" at the discretion of the King. Despite its severity, that was to some extent a mitigation of the provisions of the Jesuits, etc. Act 1584 (27 Eliz. 1. c. 2), which prescribed the death penalty for any priest who failed to leave England within 40 days of being so ordered.

Another provision disallowed Catholic schooling, inheritance and purchase of land.

== Subsequent developments ==
The Papists Act 1778 (18 Geo. 3. c. 60) exempted those taking the oath under that act from some of the provisions of the Popery Act 1698. The section as to taking and prosecuting priests was repealed, as was the penalty of perpetual imprisonment for keeping a school. The whole act was repealed by section 1 of the Religious Disabilities Act 1846 (9 & 10 Vict. c. 59), which came into force on 18 August 1846.

== Bibliography ==
- The Law & Working of the Constitution: Documents 1660-1914, ed. W. C. Costin & J. Steven Watson. A&C Black, 1952. Vol. I (1660–1783), p. 90-1.
