= List of acts of the Parliament of England from 1698 =

This is a list of acts of the Parliament of England for the year 1698.

For acts passed during the period 1707–1800, see the list of acts of the Parliament of Great Britain. See also the list of acts of the Parliament of Scotland, and the list of acts of the Parliament of Ireland.

For acts passed from 1801 onwards, see the list of acts of the Parliament of the United Kingdom. For acts of the devolved parliaments and assemblies in the United Kingdom, see the list of acts of the Scottish Parliament, the list of acts of the Northern Ireland Assembly, and the list of acts and measures of Senedd Cymru; see also the list of acts of the Parliament of Northern Ireland.

For medieval statutes, etc. that are not considered to be acts of Parliament, see the list of English statutes.

See also the List of ordinances and acts of the Parliament of England, 1642–1660 for ordinances and acts passed by the Long Parliament and other bodies without royal assent, and which were not considered to be valid legislation following the Restoration in 1660.

The number shown after each act's title is its chapter number. Acts are cited using this number, preceded by the years of the reign during which the relevant parliamentary session was held; thus the Union with Ireland Act 1800 is cited as "39 & 40 Geo. 3. c. 67", meaning the 67th act passed during the session that started in the 39th year of the reign of George III and which finished in the 40th year of that reign. The modern convention is to use Arabic numerals in citations (thus "41 Geo. 3" rather than "41 Geo. III"). Acts of the last session of the Parliament of Great Britain and the first session of the Parliament of the United Kingdom are both cited as "41 Geo. 3".

Acts passed by the Parliament of England did not have a short title; however, some of these acts have subsequently been given a short title by acts of the Parliament of the United Kingdom, such as the Short Titles Act 1896 (59 & 60 Vict. c. 14).

Acts passed by the Parliament of England were deemed to have come into effect on the first day of the session in which they were passed. Because of this, the years given in the list below may in fact be the year before a particular act was passed.

== 10 Will. 3 ==
The first session of the 4th Parliament of William III, which met from 6 December 1698 until 4 May 1699.

Cited as 10 & 11 Will. 3 in Ruffhead's Statutes at Large. This session was also traditionally cited as 10 & 11 Gul. 3, 10 & 11 W. 3, 10 Gul. 3 or 10 Gul. W.

=== Public acts ===
Short title	Citation	Royal assent
Long title
Disbanding the Army Act 1698 (repealed)	10 Will. 3. c. 1 (Note: This is the citation in The Statutes of the Realm.); 10 & 11 Will. 3. c. 1 (Note: This is the citation in The Statutes at Large.)	1 February 1699
An Act for granting an Aid to His Majesty for disbanding the Army and other necessary Occasions. (Repealed by Statute Law Revision Act 1867 (30 & 31 Vict. c. 59))
Buttons Act 1698 (repealed)	10 Will. 3. c. 2; 10 & 11 Will. 3. c. 2	1 February 1699
An Act to prevent the makeing or selling Buttons made of Cloth Serge Drugget or other Stuffs. (Repealed by Repeal of Obsolete Statutes Act 1856 (19 & 20 Vict. c. 64))
Exportation Act 1698 (repealed)	10 Will. 3. c. 3; 10 & 11 Will. 3. c. 3	1 February 1699
An Act to prohibit the Exportation of any Corn Malt Meale Flour Bread Biscuit or Starch for One Yeare from the Tenth Day of February One thousand six hundred ninety eight. (Repealed by Statute Law Revision Act 1867 (30 & 31 Vict. c. 59))
Distillation Act 1698 (repealed)	10 Will. 3. c. 4; 10 & 11 Will. 3. c. 4	24 March 1699
An Act to prohibit the excessive distilling of Spirits and Low Wines from Corne and against the Exporting of Beer and Ale and to prevent Frauds in Distillers. (Repealed by Spirits Act 1880 (43 & 44 Vict. c. 24))
Great Yarmouth Haven and Pier Duties Act 1698 (repealed)	10 Will. 3. c. 5; 10 & 11 Will. 3. c. 5	24 March 1699
An Act for the clearing repairing preserving and maintaining the Haven and Piers of Great Yarmouth in the County of Norfolke. (Repealed by Statute Law Revision Act 1948 (11 & 12 Geo. 6. c. 62))
Russia Company (Membership) Act 1698 (repealed)	10 Will. 3. c. 6; 10 & 11 Will. 3. c. 6	24 March 1699
An Act to enlarge the Trade to Russia. (Repealed by Statute Law Revision Act 1948 (11 & 12 Geo. 6. c. 62))
Parliamentary Elections Act 1698 (repealed)	10 Will. 3. c. 7; 10 & 11 Will. 3. c. 7	24 March 1699
An Act for preventing irregular Proceedings of Sheriffs and other Officers in making the Returns of Members chosen to serve in Parliament. (Repealed by Ballot Act 1872 (35 & 36 Vict. c. 33))
River Tone Navigation Act 1698	10 Will. 3. c. 8; 10 & 11 Will. 3. c. 8	24 March 1699
An Act for makeing and keeping the River Tone navigable from Bridgwater to Taunton in the County of Somersett.
Land Tax Act 1698 (repealed)	10 Will. 3. c. 9; 10 & 11 Will. 3. c. 9	4 May 1699
An Act for granting to His Majesty the Summ of One Million four hundred eighty four thousand and fifteene one Shilling eleaven Pence three Farthings for disbanding the Army providing for the Navy and for other necessary Occasions. (Repealed by Statute Law Revision Act 1867 (30 & 31 Vict. c. 59))
Taxation Act 1698 (repealed)	10 Will. 3. c. 10; 10 & 11 Will. 3. c. 21	4 May 1699
An Act for laying further Duties upon Sweets and for lessening the Duties aswell upon Vineger as upon certaine Low Wines and Whalefins and the Duties upon Brandy imported and for the more easie raising the Duties upon Leather and for charging Cynders and for permitting the Importation of Pearl Ashes and for preventing Abuses in the brewing of Beere and Ale and Frauds in Importation of Tobacco. (Repealed by Statute Law Revision Act 1867 (30 & 31 Vict. c. 59))
Taxation (Rock Salt) Act 1698 (repealed)	10 Will. 3. c. 11; 10 & 11 Will. 3. c. 22	4 May 1699
An Act for the more full and effectual charging of the Duties upon Rock-Salt. (Repealed by Statute Law Revision Act 1867 (30 & 31 Vict. c. 59))
Clerks of Assize (Fees) Act 1698 (repealed)	10 Will. 3. c. 12; 10 & 11 Will. 3. c. 23	4 May 1699
An Act for the better apprehending prosecuting and punishing of Felons that commit Burglary Housebreaking or Robbery in Shops Ware-houses Coach-houses or Stables or that steal Horses. (Repealed by Criminal Statutes Repeal Act 1827 (7 & 8 Geo. 4. c. 27), Criminal Law (India) Act 1828 (9 Geo. 4. c. 74) and Statute Law Revision Act 1948 (11 & 12 Geo. 6. c. 62))
Billingsgate, etc. Act 1698 (repealed)	10 Will. 3. c. 13; 10 & 11 Will. 3. c. 24	4 May 1699
An Act for making Billingsgate a Free Market for Sale of Fish. (Repealed by Sea Fisheries Act 1868 (31 & 32 Vict. c. 45))
Trade to Newfoundland Act 1698 or Newfoundland Act 1698 or King William's Act (repealed)	10 Will. 3. c. 14; 10 & 11 Will. 3. c. 25	4 May 1699
An Act to Incourage the Trade to Newfoundland. (Repealed by Statute Law Revision Act 1867 (30 & 31 Vict. c. 59))
Sedgmoor Drainage Act 1698	10 Will. 3. c. 15; 10 & 11 Will. 3. c. 26	4 May 1699
An Act for opening the ancient and makeing any New Roynes and Water Courses in and neare Sedgmore in the County of Somerset for rendring the said Moor more healthfull and profitable to the Inhabitants.
Wool Act 1698 or the Woolens Act 1698 (repealed)	10 Will. 3. c. 16; 10 & 11 Will. 3. c. 10	4 May 1699
An Act to prevent the Exportation of Wool out of the Kingdoms of Ireland and England into Forreigne parts and for the Incouragement of the Woollen Manufactures in the Kingdom of England. (Repealed by Customs Law Repeal Act 1825 (6 Geo. 4. c. 105))
Exercise of Trades Act 1698 (repealed)	10 Will. 3. c. 17; 10 & 11 Will. 3. c. 11	4 May 1699
An Act to enable such Officers and Soldiers as have been in His Majesties Service during the late Warr to exercise Trades and for Officers to account with their Soldiers. (Repealed by Statute Law Revision Act 1867 (30 & 31 Vict. c. 59))
Militia Act 1698 (repealed)	10 Will. 3. c. 18; 10 & 11 Will. 3. c. 12	4 May 1699
An Act for raising the Militia for the Yeare One thousand six hundred ninety nine although the Months Pay formerly advanced be not repaid. (Repealed by Statute Law Revision Act 1867 (30 & 31 Vict. c. 59))
Imprisonment of Certain Traitors Act 1698 (repealed)	10 Will. 3. c. 19; 10 & 11 Will. 3. c. 13	4 May 1699
An Act for the continuing the Imprisonment of Counter and others for the late horrid Conspiracy to assassinate the Person of His Sacred Majesty. (Repealed by Statute Law Revision Act 1867 (30 & 31 Vict. c. 59))
Reversal of Fines and Recoveries, etc. Act 1698 (repealed)	10 Will. 3. c. 20; 10 & 11 Will. 3. c. 14	4 May 1699
An Act for limiting certaine times within which Writts of Error shall be brought for the reversing Fines Common Recoveries and ancient Judgments. (Repealed by Civil Procedure Acts Repeal Act 1879 (42 & 43 Vict. c. 59))
Recovery of Tithes Act 1698 (repealed)	10 Will. 3. c. 21; 10 & 11 Will. 3. c. 15	4 May 1699
An Act for continueing the Act for the more easie Recovery of Small Tythes. (Repealed by Statute Law Revision Act 1867 (30 & 31 Vict. c. 59))
Posthumous Children Act 1698 (repealed)	10 Will. 3. c. 22; 10 & 11 Will. 3. c. 16	4 May 1699
An Act to enable Posthumus Children to take Estates as if borne in their Fathers Life time. (Repealed by Law of Property (Amendment) Act 1924 (15 & 16 Geo. 5. c. 5))
Suppression of Lotteries Act 1698 (repealed)	10 Will. 3. c. 23; 10 & 11 Will. 3. c. 17	4 May 1699
An Act for suppressing of Lotteries. (Repealed by Betting and Lotteries Act 1934 (24 & 25 Geo. 5. c. 58) and Betting and Lotteries Act (Northern Ireland) 1957 (c. 19 (N.I.)))
Duties on Glass (Repeal) Act 1698 (repealed)	10 Will. 3. c. 24; 10 & 11 Will. 3. c. 18	4 May 1699
An Act for takeing off the remaining Duties upon Glasse Wares. (Repealed by Statute Law Revision Act 1867 (30 & 31 Vict. c. 59))
Aire and Calder Navigation Act 1698	10 Will. 3. c. 25; 10 & 11 Will. 3. c. 19	4 May 1699
An Act for the makeing and keeping navigable the Rivers of Aire and Calder in the County of Yorke.
River Trent Navigation Act 1698	10 Will. 3. c. 26; 10 & 11 Will. 3. c. 20	4 May 1699
An Act for makeing and keeping the River Trent in the River Trent in the Counties of Leicester Derby and Stafford navigable.

=== Private acts ===
Short title	Citation	Royal assent
Long title
Earl of Derwentwater's Estate Act 1698	10 Will. 3. c. 1 Pr.	1 February 1699
An Act for the more easy and certain Payment of the Debts of Edward Earl of Derwentwater, by Sale of Woods and Timber; and for enabling him to raise Money, for Discharge of Incumbrances upon Part of his Estate.
Farewell's Naturalization Act 1698	10 Will. 3. c. 2 Pr.	1 February 1699
An Act for naturalizing Elizabeth Farewell.
Lepell's Naturalization Act 1698	10 Will. 3. c. 3 Pr.	1 February 1699
An Act for naturalizing Nicholas Lepell.
Naturalization of Bartholomew Ogilvy and others.	10 Will. 3. c. 4 Pr.	1 February 1699
An Act for naturalizing Bartholomew Ogilvy and others.
Freedom of ships "Margaret" and "Friendship" of Bristol.	10 Will. 3. c. 5 Pr.	24 March 1699
An Act for the Ships Margaret and Friendship, of Bristoll, to trade as free Ships.
Naturalization of James St. Pierre, John Denty and Remond Hensbergh.	10 Will. 3. c. 6 Pr.	24 March 1699
An Act to naturalize James St. Pierre, John Denty, and Remond Hensbergh.
Naturalization of Charles de Siburg and Francis St. George.	10 Will. 3. c. 7 Pr.	24 March 1699
An Act to naturalize Charles de Sibourg and Francis St. George.
Naturalization of William de Witt and Godfrey Lloyd.	10 Will. 3. c. 8 Pr.	24 March 1699
An Act to naturalize William Lloyd, Cornelius de Witt, and Godfrey Lloyd.
Meoles' Naturalization Act 1698	10 Will. 3. c. 9 Pr.	24 March 1699
An Act to naturalize John Meoles.
Vyner's Estate Act 1698	10 Will. 3. c. 10 Pr.	24 March 1699
An Act for the Relief of the Creditors of Sir Robert Vyner Knight and Baronet, deceased.
Naturalization of Theophilus Rabesineres and others.	10 Will. 3. c. 11 Pr.	24 March 1699
An Act for the Naturalization of Theophilus Rabesineres and others.
Penne's Estate Act 1698	10 Will. 3. c. 12 Pr.	24 March 1699
An Act for the enabling George Penne Esquire to sell Lands, for the Payment of Debts, and other Purposes therein mentioned.
Naturalization of Philip de Chenevix and others.	10 Will. 3. c. 13 Pr.	24 March 1699
An Act to naturalize Philip Chenevix and others.
Naturalization of William Lower, William Darnell and Peter Godby.	10 Will. 3. c. 14 Pr.	24 March 1699
An Act to naturalize William Lower, William Darnell, and Peter Godby.
Naturalization of Anthony Columbiere and others.	10 Will. 3. c. 15 Pr.	24 March 1699
An Act for naturalizing Anthony Coulombiere and others.
Burnett's Naturalization Act 1698	10 Will. 3. c. 16 Pr.	24 March 1699
An Act to naturalize George Burnett.
Naturalization of Mark De Moncall and David Loches.	10 Will. 3. c. 17 Pr.	24 March 1699
An Act to naturalize Marke Anthony Davesseins de Moncall and David Loches.
Naturalization of John Francis De Carcassonet and others.	10 Will. 3. c. 18 Pr.	24 March 1699
An Act for the Naturalization of John Francis de Carcassonet and others.
Naturalization of Captain Thomas Browne and others.	10 Will. 3. c. 19 Pr.	24 March 1699
An Act for naturalizing Captain Thomas Browne and others.
Naturalization of John de Philip and others.	10 Will. 3. c. 20 Pr.	24 March 1699
An Act to naturalize John de Philiponeau Sieur de Montargier, and others.
Naturalization of Peter Barailleau and others.	10 Will. 3. c. 21 Pr.	24 March 1699
An Act for naturalizing Peter Barailleau and others.
Freedom of ship "Charles," flyboat of Exeter.	10 Will. 3. c. 22 Pr.	24 March 1699
An Act for the Ship Charles Flyboate, of Exeter, to trade as a free Ship.
St. Eloy's Naturalization Act 1698	10 Will. 3. c. 23 Pr.	24 March 1699
An Act to naturalize Isaac Gouyquett D'St. Eloy.
Settlement of augmentations on certain vicarages forever.	10 Will. 3. c. 24 Pr.	4 May 1699
An Act for settling Augmentations on certain Vicarages for ever.
Confirming grant and settlement by William Forster of manors and lands in Durham and Northumberland to Thomas Lord Fairfax and others upon certain trusts.	10 Will. 3. c. 25 Pr.	4 May 1699
An Act for the confirming of a Grant and Settlement, made by William Forster Esquire, of divers Manors and Lands, in the County Palatine of Durham, and County of Northumberland, to Thomas Lord Fairfax and others, upon certain Trusts and Uses therein mentioned.
Darcy's Estate Act 1698	10 Will. 3. c. 26 Pr.	4 May 1699
An Act for Sale of some Part of the Estate of Sir Thomas Darcey deceased, for Payment of Debts.
Price's Estate Act 1698	10 Will. 3. c. 27 Pr.	4 May 1699
An Act to enable Edward Price Esquire to transfer a Charge of One Thousand Pounds, for the Use of his Younger Children, from an Estate in the County of Montgomery, to an Estate in the Counties of Hereford and Radnor, of better Value.
Scott's Estate Act 1698	10 Will. 3. c. 28 Pr.	4 May 1699
An Act to enable Trustees to sell Part of the Estate of George Scott Esquire, to pay Debts, and raise Portions for his Brothers and Sister; and to settle other Part of his Estate.
Vesey's Estate Act 1698	10 Will. 3. c. 29 Pr.	4 May 1699
An Act for Sale of the Estate of Dudley Vesey, in Hintlesham, in the County of Suffolk, for the Payment of his Debts.
Aldworth's Estate Act 1698	10 Will. 3. c. 30 Pr.	4 May 1699
An Act to enable Robert Aldworth and his Wife to sell their Estate, in or near Wantage, in the County of Berks, for raising Three Hundred Pounds, for Payment of his Debts; and for applying the Residue of the Money for purchasing some other Estate, for the sole Use of his Wife and Children.
Savery's Fire-engine Act 1698	10 Will. 3. c. 31 Pr.	4 May 1699
An Act for the Encouragement of a new Invention by Thomas Savery, for raising Water, and occasioning Motion to all Sorts of Mill-work, by the impellent Force of Fire.
Naturalization of Scipio Guy and others.	10 Will. 3. c. 32 Pr.	4 May 1699
An Act to naturalize Scipio Guy and others.
Moor's Estate Act 1698	10 Will. 3. c. 33 Pr.	4 May 1699
An Act for the Sale of the Manors of Halwill and Beckett, in the County of Devon, the Estate of John Moor, for Payment of Debts.
Lascells' Estate Act 1698	10 Will. 3. c. 34 Pr.	4 May 1699
An Act for vesting the Real Estate late of Thomas Lascells Esquire deceased, in Trustees, to be sold, for the Payment of his Debts.
Young's Estate Act 1698	10 Will. 3. c. 35 Pr.	4 May 1699
An Act to enable John Young Gentleman to sell Lands, for Payment of Debts and Legacies.
Liverpool Act 1698	10 Will. 3. c. 36 Pr.	4 May 1699
An Act to enable the Town of Liverpool, in the County Palatine of Lancaster, to build a Church, and endow the same; and for making the said Town and Liberties thereof a Parish of itself, distinct from Walton.
Okeover's Estate Act 1698	10 Will. 3. c. 37 Pr.	4 May 1699
An Act to enable Thomas Okeover Gentleman, Son and Heir Apparent of Rowland Okeover, of Okeover, in the County of Stafford, Esquire, together with the said Rowland Okeover, to make a Jointure and Settlement upon the Marriage of the said Thomas Okeover.
Leeke's Estate Act 1698	10 Will. 3. c. 38 Pr.	4 May 1699
An Act to enable Katherine Leeke, an Infant under the Age of One and Twenty Years, to settle and dispose of her Estate upon her Marriage.
Seyliard's Estate Act 1698	10 Will. 3. c. 39 Pr.	4 May 1699
An Act for vesting certain Lands of Sir Thomas Seyliard Baronet, in the County of Kent, in Trustees, to be sold, for the Payment of his Sisters Portions charged thereon.
Byde's Estate Act 1698	10 Will. 3. c. 40 Pr.	4 May 1699
An Act to enable Thomas Byde Esquire (an Infant, with the Consent of his Guardians and next Relations) to make a Contract for the buying in of his Mother's Jointure; and to sell a small Estate in Great Amwell, in the County of Hertford; and likewise for the securing and raising a Portion for Barbara Byde, Sister of the said Thomas Byde, and for other Purposes in the Act mentioned.
Sale of manor of Lordington and Whitney and other lands in Sussex and laying out £5,000 to purchase other lands. (Note: Lordington House.)	10 Will. 3. c. 41 Pr.	4 May 1699
An Act for Sale of the Manor of Lordington, alias Lurtington, and Whitway, and divers Lands in the County of Sussex; and for laying out Five Thousand Pounds in purchasing other Lands, to be settled in Lieu thereof.
Jones' Estate Act 1698	10 Will. 3. c. 42 Pr.	4 May 1699
An Act to enable Samuel Wake, alias Jones, Esquire, to sell Lands, to pay Debts; and to purchase other Lands adjoining to, and formerly Parcel of, the Manor of Waltham, alias Waltham Holy-Cross, in the County of Essex, to be settled to the same Uses.
Bridges' Estate Act 1698	10 Will. 3. c. 43 Pr.	4 May 1699
An Act for the vesting and settling the Estate of Anne Bridges, an Infant, in Bermudas, alias The Summer Istands, in America, in and upon Trustees, to be sold; and laying out the Money arising by such Sale in England, for the Use of the said Anne Bridges.
Weslyd's Estate Act 1698	10 Will. 3. c. 44 Pr.	4 May 1699
An Act for the enabling Cyriac Weslyd Esquire to sell some Part of his Estate, which, by Articles upon his Marriage, was agreed to be settled upon his Wife and Children; and for the settling of other Part of his Estate, of better Value, to the same Uses.
Freedom of ships "Hawke" and "Rainbow" to trade as English-built ships.	10 Will. 3. c. 45 Pr.	4 May 1699
An Act for the Ships Hawke and Rainbow to trade as English-built Ships.
Bull's Estate Act 1698	10 Will. 3. c. 46 Pr.	4 May 1699
An Act to enable John Bull, an Infant, to sell his Lands in Kent, for the Payment of Debts and Annuities charged thereon; and for Provision of Younger Children.
Pulteney's Estate Act 1698	10 Will. 3. c. 47 Pr.	4 May 1699
An Act for the enabling the surviving Trustee of Sir William Pulteney Knight, deceased, to make Leases, for the raising Monies, for Payment of his Son William Pulteney's Debts, and other Purposes therein mentioned.
Enabling Popham Conway and Francis and Charles Seymour to lease their estates.	10 Will. 3. c. 48 Pr.	4 May 1699
An Act to enable Popham Conway, Francis Seymour, and Charles Seymour, Esquires, and their Issue Male, severally and successively, to make Leases of their Estates.
Hough's Estate Act 1698	10 Will. 3. c. 49 Pr.	4 May 1699
An Act for the Sale of the Estate of Zenobia Hough, for the Payment of the Debts of her Husband, and other Uses.
Freedom of ship "Hope" (of great length and very serviceable for importing masts) to trade as an English-built ship.	10 Will. 3. c. 50 Pr.	4 May 1699
An Act to enable the Ship Hope (of great Length, and very serviceable for bringing Masts into this Kingdom) to trade as an English-built Ship.
Athy's Estate Act 1698	10 Will. 3. c. 51 Pr.	4 May 1699
An Act to enable William Wrayford Gentleman, and Dame Anne Rich Widow, to make Leases of Houses and Ground in Covent Garden, late the Estate of John Athy, Citizen and Haberdasher of London.
Andrews' Estate Act 1698	10 Will. 3. c. 52 Pr.	4 May 1699
An Act for Sale of the Manor of Downham, in the County of Essex (the Estate of Sir Francis Andrews); and for buying and settling other Lands to the same Uses.
Ships "King William" and "Charles the Second:" discharge from penalties of the Act of navigation.	10 Will. 3. c. 53 Pr.	4 May 1699
An Act to discharge the Ships King William and Charles the Second from the Penalties of the Act of Navigation.
Methwold's Estate Act 1698	10 Will. 3. c. 54 Pr.	4 May 1699
An Act to enable Thomas Methwold Esquire to raise the Sum of Twelve Hundred Pounds upon his Estate, by him laid out in improving the same.
Cowslade's Estate Act 1698	10 Will. 3. c. 55 Pr.	4 May 1699
An Act for settling divers Freehold and Leasehold Houses, the Estate of Thomas Cowslade, an Infant, and others, to discharge a Mortgage, and to purchase other Lands, to be settled to the like Uses.
Naturalization of Augustine Cloribus and others.	10 Will. 3. c. 56 Pr.	4 May 1699
An Act for naturalizing Augustine Cloribus and others.
Naturalization of Samuel Bernadeau, Peter Chantreau des Gaudree and others belonging to His Majesty's Guards and Grenadiers.	10 Will. 3. c. 57 Pr.	4 May 1699
An Act for naturalizing Samuel Bernardeau, Peter Chantreau des Gaudree, and others, Private Gentlemen belonging to His Majesty's Three Troops of Guards and Grenadiers.
Naturalization of Richard Legg and others.	10 Will. 3. c. 58 Pr.	4 May 1699
An Act to naturalize Richard Legg and others.
Naturalization of Sir David Collier, Isaac la Melionere, Peter de Belcastel and William Reiatore.	10 Will. 3. c. 59 Pr.	4 May 1699
An Act for naturalizing Sir David Collier, Isaac La Melionere, Peter de Belcastel, and William Rietourt.

=== Sources ===
- Raithby, John, ed. (1963) [1820]. "10° Gul. III.". Statutes of the Realm. Vol. 7: The Statutes of King William III (1695–1701). London: Dawsons. pp. 452–543 – via HathiTrust.
- Raithby, John, ed. (1820). Statutes of the Realm. Vol. 7: 1696-1701 – via British History Online.
- Pickering, Danby, ed. (1764). "Anno decimo Gulielmi III". The Statutes at Large. Vol. 10: From the Eighth Year of King William III to the Second Year of Queen Anne. Cambridge: Joseph Bentham. pp. 234–238 – via Internet Archive.
- Pickering, Danby, ed. (1764). "Anno decimo & undecimo Gulielmi III". The Statutes at Large. Vol. 10: From the Eighth Year of King William III to the Second Year of Queen Anne. Cambridge: Joseph Bentham. pp. 238–300 – via Internet Archive.
- Journals of the House of Commons. Vol. 12. London: His Majesty's Stationery Office. 1803 – via Google Books.
- Chronological Table of and Index to the Statutes. Vol. 1: To the End of the Session 59 Vict. Sess. 2 (1895) (13th ed.). London: Her Majesty's Stationery Office. 1896. pp. 80–81 – via Google Books.
- "Acts of the English Parliament from 1698". legislation.gov.uk. The National Archives.
- "Chronological Tables of the Private and Personal Acts: Part 5 (1695–1701)". legislation.gov.uk. The National Archives.

== 11 Will. 3 ==
The second session of the 4th Parliament of William III, which met from 16 November 1699 until 11 April 1700.

c.2 onwards listed as 11 & 12 Will. 3 in Ruffhead's Statutes at Large. This session was also traditionally cited as 11 Gul. 3, 11 W. 3, 11 & 12 Gul. 3 or 11 & 12. W. 3.

=== Public acts ===
Short title	Citation	Royal assent
Long title
Bounty on Exportation Act 1698 (repealed)	11 Will. 3. c. 1	9 February 1700
An Act for taking away the Bounty Money for exporting Corn from the Ninth Day of February One thousand six hundred ninety nine to the Nine and twentieth Day of September One thousand seaven hundred. (Repealed by Statute Law Revision Act 1867 (30 & 31 Vict. c. 59))
Crown Lands (Forfeited Estates) Act 1698 (repealed)	11 Will. 3. c. 2 (Note: This is the chapter in The Statutes of the Realm.); 11 & 12 Will. 3. c. 2 (Note: This is the chapter in The Statutes at Large.)	11 April 1700
An Act for granting an Aid to His Majesty by Sale of the forfeited and other Estates and Interests in Ireland and by a Land Tax in England for the severall Purposes therein mentioned. (Repealed by Statute Law (Repeals) Act 1978 (c. 45))
Taxation (No. 2) Act 1698 (repealed)	11 Will. 3. c. 3; 11 & 12 Will. 3. c. 3	11 April 1700
An Act for laying further Duties upon wrought Silks Muslins and some other Commodities of the East-Indies and for enlargeing the Time for purchasing certaine reversionary Annuities therein mentioned. (Repealed by Statute Law Revision Act 1867 (30 & 31 Vict. c. 59))
Popery Act 1698 (repealed)	11 Will. 3. c. 4; 11 & 12 Will. 3. c. 4	11 April 1700
An Act for the further preventing the Growth of Popery. (Repealed by Religious Disabilities Act 1846 (9 & 10 Vict. c. 59))
Dover Harbour Act 1698 (repealed)	11 Will. 3. c. 5; 11 & 12 Will. 3. c. 5	11 April 1700
An Act for the Repaire of Dover Harbour. (Repealed by Dover Harbour Act 1828 (9 Geo. 4. c. xxxi))
Aliens Act 1698 (repealed)	11 Will. 3. c. 6; 11 & 12 Will. 3. c. 6	11 April 1700
An Act to enable His Majesties naturall borne Subjects to inherite the Estate of their Ancestors either lineall or collaterall notwithstanding their Father or Mother were Aliens. (Repealed by Naturalization Act 1870 (33 & 34 Vict. c. 14))
Piracy Act 1698 (repealed)	11 Will. 3. c. 7; 11 & 12 Will. 3. c. 7	11 April 1700
An Act for the more effectuall Suppressions of Piracy. (Repealed by Statute Law (Repeals) Act 1993 (c. 50))
Debts Due to the Army, etc. Act 1698 (repealed)	11 Will. 3. c. 8; 11 & 12 Will. 3. c. 8	11 April 1700
An Act for the appointing Commissioners to take examine and determine the Debts due to the Army Navy and for Transport-Service and alsoe an Account of the Prizes taken during the late Warr. (Repealed by Statute Law Revision Act 1867 (30 & 31 Vict. c. 59))
Frivolous Suits Act 1698 (repealed)	11 Will. 3. c. 9; 11 & 12 Will. 3. c. 9	11 April 1700
An Act for preventing of frivolous and vexatious Suits in the Principality of Wales and the Counties Palatine. (Repealed by Civil Procedure Acts Repeal Act 1879 (42 & 43 Vict. c. 59))
Encouragement of Manufactures Act 1698 or the Calico Act 1700 (repealed)	11 Will. 3. c. 10; 11 & 12 Will. 3. c. 10	11 April 1700
An Act for the more effectuall imploying the Poor by incourageing the Manufactures of this Kingdom. (Repealed by Statute Law Revision Act 1867 (30 & 31 Vict. c. 59))
Repeal of 9 Will. 3. c. 9 Act 1698 (repealed)	11 Will. 3. c. 11; 11 & 12 Will. 3. c. 11	11 April 1700
An Act to repeale an Act made in the Ninth Yeare of His Majesties Reigne, intituled, "An Act for rendring the Laws more effectuall for preventing the Importation of Forreigne Bone-Lace Loom-Lace Needle-Worke Point and Cut-Worke Three Months after the Prohibition of the Woollen Manufactures in Flanders shall be taken off." (Note: Lace Act 1697 (9 Will. 3. c. 9)) (Repealed by Statute Law Revision Act 1867 (30 & 31 Vict. c. 59))
Governors of Plantations Act 1698 (repealed)	11 Will. 3. c. 12; 11 & 12 Will. 3. c. 12	11 April 1700
An Act to punish Governors of Plantations in this Kingdom for Crimes by them committed in the Plantations. (Repealed by Statute Law (Repeals) Act 1995 (c. 44))
Exportation (No. 2) Act 1698 (repealed)	11 Will. 3. c. 13; 11 & 12 Will. 3. c. 13	11 April 1700
An Act for continueing severall Laws therein mentioned, and for explaining the Act intituled "An Act to prevent the Exportation of Wooll out of the Kingdoms of Ireland and England into Forreigne Parts and for the Incouragement of the Woollen Manufactures in the Kingdom of England." (Note: Wool Act 1698 (10 Will. 3. c. 16)) (Repealed by Statute Law Revision Act 1867 (30 & 31 Vict. c. 59))
Militia (No. 2) Act 1698 (repealed)	11 Will. 3. c. 14; 11 & 12 Will. 3. c. 14	11 April 1700
An Act for raiseing the Militia for the Yeare One thousand seaven hundred although the Months pay formerly advanced be not repaid. (Repealed by Statute Law Revision Act 1867 (30 & 31 Vict. c. 59))
Ale Measures Act 1698 (repealed)	11 Will. 3. c. 15; 11 & 12 Will. 3. c. 15	11 April 1700
An Act for the ascertaining the Measures for retailing Ale and Beer. (Repealed by Statute Law Revision Act 1867 (30 & 31 Vict. c. 59))
Tithes of Hemp and Flax Act 1698 (repealed)	11 Will. 3. c. 16; 11 & 12 Will. 3. c. 16	11 April 1700
An Act for the better ascertaining the Tythes of Hemp and Flax. (Repealed by Statute Law Revision Act 1887 (50 & 51 Vict. c. 59))
Signing the Association, etc. Act 1698 (repealed)	11 Will. 3. c. 17; 11 & 12 Will. 3. c. 17	11 April 1700
An Act to prevent Disputes that may arise by Officers and Members of Corporations haveing neglected to signe the Association and takeing the Oaths in due Time. (Repealed by Statute Law Revision Act 1867 (30 & 31 Vict. c. 59))
Vagrancy Act 1698 (repealed)	11 Will. 3. c. 18; 11 & 12 Will. 3. c. 18	11 April 1700
An Act for the more effectuall Punishment of Vagrants and sending them whither by Law they ought to be sent. (Repealed by Statute Law Revision Act 1867 (30 & 31 Vict. c. 59) and Statute Law Revision Act 1948 (11 & 12 Geo. 6. c. 62))
Gaols Act 1698 (repealed)	11 Will. 3. c. 19; 11 & 12 Will. 3. c. 19	11 April 1700
An Act to enable Justices of Peace to build and repair Goales in their respective Counties. (Repealed by Gaols Act 1823 (4 Geo. 4. c. 64))
Taxation (No. 3) Act 1698 (repealed)	11 Will. 3. c. 20; 11 & 12 Will. 3. c. 20	11 April 1700
An Act for takeing away the Duties upon the Woollen Manufactures, Corn Grain Bread Biscuit and Meal exported. (Repealed by Statute Law Revision Act 1867 (30 & 31 Vict. c. 59))
Thames Watermen Act 1698 (repealed)	11 Will. 3. c. 21; 11 & 12 Will. 3. c. 21	11 April 1700
An Act for the Explanation and better Execution of former Acts made touching Watermen and Wherrymen rowing on the River of Thames and for the better ordering and governing the said Watermen Wherrymen and Lightermen upon the said River between Gravesend and Windsor. (Repealed by Thames Watermen and Lightermen Act 1827 (7 & 8 Geo. 4. c. lxxv))
River Lark Act 1698	11 Will. 3. c. 22; 11 & 12 Will. 3. c. 22	11 April 1700
An Act for makeing the River Larke alias Burn Navigable.
Bristol Roads and Avon and Frome Navigation Act 1698	11 Will. 3. c. 23; 11 & 12 Will. 3. c. 23	11 April 1700
An Act for the better preserving the Navigation of the Rivers Avon and Froome and for cleansing paving and inlightning the Streets of the City of Bristoll.
River Dee, Chester Act 1698	11 Will. 3. c. 24; 11 & 12 Will. 3. c. 24	11 April 1700
An Act to enable the Mayor and Citizens of the City of Chester to recover and preserve the Navigation upon the River Dee.

=== Private acts ===
Short title	Citation	Royal assent
Long title
Noble's Divorce Act 1698	11 Will. 3. c. 1 Pr.	9 February 1700
An Act to enable Thomas Noble Gentleman to sell the undivided Third Part of the Manor of Foxton, in the County of Leicester, when he shall have settled other Lands, an entire Estate, of greater Value, to the same Uses.
Duke of Norfolk's Divorce Act 1698	11 Will. 3. c. 2 Pr.	11 April 1700
An Act to dissolve the Duke of Norfolk's Marriage with the Lady Mary Mordant, and to enable him to marry again.
Baldwin's Estate Act 1698	11 Will. 3. c. 3 Pr.	11 April 1700
An Act for the better enabling Anne Baldwin Widow to sell a Capital Messuage and Lands called Wiltons, and other Lands, in the County of Bucks, devised by her Husband's Will.
Old East India Company Act 1698	11 Will. 3. c. 4 Pr.	11 April 1700
An Act for continuing the Governor and Company of Merchants of London trading to The East Indies a Corporation.
Hopwood's Marriage Settlement Act 1698	11 Will. 3. c. 5 Pr.	11 April 1700
An Act for rectifying a Mistake in the Marriage Settlement of Thomas Hopwood Gentleman, and Elizabeth his Wife, in order to raise Portions for Younger Children, and to pay Debts.
Clobery's Estate Act 1698	11 Will. 3. c. 6 Pr.	11 April 1700
An Act for the more speedy Payment of the Debts of John Clobery Esquire deceased, and for the raising Portions and Maintenance for his Children.
May's Estate Act 1698	11 Will. 3. c. 7 Pr.	11 April 1700
An Act to enable Thomas May Gentleman to sell Lands in the County of Suffolke, which were settled upon his Marriage; and to convey other Lands in the same County, of a greater Value, to the same Uses.
Gardiner's Estate Act 1698	11 Will. 3. c. 8 Pr.	11 April 1700
An Act for vesting the Real Estate of Joseph Gardiner and Sarah his Wife, late the Estate of William Ridges Esquire deceased, in Trustees, to be sold, for Payment of the Debts and Legacies therein mentioned; and for applying the Residue of the Money upon the Trusts therein specified.
Lacy's Estate Act 1698	11 Will. 3. c. 9 Pr.	11 April 1700
An Act for Sale of several Western Manors and Lands, the Estate of Arthur Lacy Esquire, for discharging a Mortgage thereupon; and for laying out the Surplus-money in the Purchase of Demesne Lands, to be settled to the same Uses.
Siderfin's Estate Act 1698	11 Will. 3. c. 10 Pr.	11 April 1700
An Act for vesting the Manor of Exton, and other Lands in the County of Somerset, late the Estate of Thomas Siderfin Esquire deceased, in Trustees, to be sold, for Payment of Debts.
New Way to Lincoln's Inn Fields Act 1698	11 Will. 3. c. 11 Pr.	11 April 1700
An Act for the speedy and effectual making a convenient Way out of Chancery Lane, to Lincolne's Inn Fields, and Places adjacent.
Merefield's Estate Act 1698	11 Will. 3. c. 12 Pr.	11 April 1700
An Act for settling of the Lands, Tenements, and Hereditaments, late of Robert Merefield and John Merefield Esquires, deceased; and for ascertaining the Proportions between the Widow of the said Robert, and his surviving Children.
Lady Bond's Will Act 1698	11 Will. 3. c. 13 Pr.	11 April 1700
An Act for the settling all Differences concerning Dame Mary Bond's Will, and for performing the same.
Robinson's Estate Act 1698	11 Will. 3. c. 14 Pr.	11 April 1700
An Act for charging the Estate of Sir Thomas Robinson Baronet with Seven Thousand Pounds, for the Portion of Anne his Sister; and for settling her Estate upon the said Sir Thomas Robinson in Lieu thereof.
Norwich Streets, &c. Act 1698	11 Will. 3. c. 15 Pr.	11 April 1700
An Act for confirming a Lease and certain Indentures, between the City of Norwich, and Richard Barry Esquire, George Sorocold Gentleman, and Richard Soame Merchant; and for enlightening the Streets of the said City.
Villiers' Estate Act 1698	11 Will. 3. c. 16 Pr.	11 April 1700
An Act for settling the Estate of Katherine Fitzgerald Villiers; and raising of Money for Payment of Debts, and better securing the Portions of her Five Younger Children, by Edward Fitzgerald Villiers Esquire, her late Husband.
Mansell's Estate Act 1698	11 Will. 3. c. 17 Pr.	11 April 1700
An Act to enable Edward Mansell Esquire to mortgage or sell the Impropriate Rectories of Llanriddian and Penrice, for Payment of Debts, and raising Portions for Younger Children; and for settling the Manor of Henlys, and other Lands of more Value.
Harrison's Estate Act 1698	11 Will. 3. c. 18 Pr.	11 April 1700
An Act for the selling the Reversion and Inheritance of the Farm of Nethercott, in the County of Oxon, for Payment of the Debts and Legacies of George Harrison Esquire deceased.
Child's Estate Act 1698	11 Will. 3. c. 19 Pr.	11 April 1700
An Act for vesting certain Lands and Tenements of Sir Josiah Child Baronet deceased, in Trustees, for the better Performance of certain Covenants entered into by the said Sir Josiah Child upon the Marriage of his Eldest Son with the Daughter of Sir Thomas Cooke Knight.
Holman's Estate Act 1698	11 Will. 3. c. 20 Pr.	11 April 1700
An Act to supply the Loss of certain Indentures of Lease and Release heretofore made by Philip Holman Esquire deceased, to George Holman his Son, now also deceased.
Butler's Estate Act 1698	11 Will. 3. c. 21 Pr.	11 April 1700
An Act to enable Henry Butler Esquire to make Leases of Part of his Estate in Lancashire, for Discharge of Incumbrances thereupon.
Cowper's Estate Act 1698	11 Will. 3. c. 22 Pr.	11 April 1700
An Act for vesting Part of the Estate of Thomas Cowper, of the City of Chester, Esquire, in Trustees, for Payment of Debts.
Barlow's Estate Act 1698	11 Will. 3. c. 23 Pr.	11 April 1700
An Act for confirming the Sale of the Manor of Stansall, and certain Tenements in the County of York, made by Thomas Barlow Gentleman; and for settling other Lands, of greater Value, to the same Uses; and for vesting other Lands and Hereditaments in Trustees, to be sold, for purchasing other Lands, to be settled to the same Uses.
Riddell's Estate Act 1698	11 Will. 3. c. 24 Pr.	11 April 1700
An Act for the selling the Manor of Fenham, in the County of Northumberland, for the Payment of the Debts of Thomas Riddell Esquire, and Edward Riddell his Son, and raising Portions for the Daughters of the said Thomas Riddell.
Hore's Estate Act 1698	11 Will. 3. c. 25 Pr.	11 April 1700
An Act for Sale of Part of the Estate of Charles Hore Esquire, for Payment of his Debts; and for settling other Part in Trust, for raising the Portion for Elizabeth his only Daughter by his former Wife; and for making a Jointure for Mary his now Wife; and for a Provision for the Children of the said Mary.
Thomas's Estate Act 1698	11 Will. 3. c. 26 Pr.	11 April 1700
An Act to enable Dalby Thomas Esquire to sell Lands in Islington, in Midd'x, settled, on his Marriage with Dorothy his now Wife, as Part of her Jointure; he settling another Estate, of greater Value, in Lieu thereof.
Wallop's Estate Act 1698	11 Will. 3. c. 27 Pr.	11 April 1700
An Act to enable Trustees to make Sale of the Inheritance of the Twelfth Part of several Manors, Lands, and Tenements, of Bluet Wallop Esquire, during his Minority; and to purchase other Lands with the Money to be raised by such Sale, to be settled to the same Uses as the said Twelfth Part was so settled.
Wessell's Estate Act 1698	11 Will. 3. c. 28 Pr.	11 April 1700
An Act to enable Leonard Wessell Esquire to sell the Manor of Acres Fleete, in the County of Essex, settled, on his Marriage with Sarah his now Wife, as Part of her Jointure; laying out the Money arising by such Sale in Purchase of other Lands.
Howland's Estate Act 1698	11 Will. 3. c. 29 Pr.	11 April 1700
An Act for taking the Estate in Law of several Messuages and Lands mortgaged to Jeffrey and Samuel Howland, and their Heirs, out of Wriothesley Russell (commonly called Lord Marquis of Tavistock) and his Lady.
French Protestant Church in St. Martin Orgars Act 1698	11 Will. 3. c. 30 Pr.	11 April 1700
An Act for confirming a Lease of a Piece of Ground, from the Rector and Churchwardens of the Parish of St. Martin's Orgars, London, for Liberty to build a Church thereon, for the Worship and Service of God, in the French Tongue, according to the Usage of the Church of England.
Janson's Estate Act 1698	11 Will. 3. c. 31 Pr.	11 April 1700
An Act for the Sale of the Estate of Bryan J'anson Esquire deceased, for Payment of Debts, and Provision for his Wife and Children.
Martha Ship Act 1698	11 Will. 3. c. 32 Pr.	11 April 1700
An Act for the Ship Martha of Margam to trade as a free Ship.
Jacobson's, &c. Naturalization Act 1698	11 Will. 3. c. 33 Pr.	11 April 1700
An Act for naturalizing Theodore Jacobson and others.
D'Harcourt's, &c. Naturalization Act 1698	11 Will. 3. c. 34 Pr.	11 April 1700
An Act for the Naturalization of Oliver D'Harcourt and others.
Naturalization of John Bourges and others.	11 Will. 3. c. 35 Pr.	11 April 1700
An Act for naturalizing John Bourges and others.
Naturalization of John Ricard and Jacob Dabbadie.	11 Will. 3. c. 36 Pr.	11 April 1700
An Act for naturalizing John Ricarde, Jacob Dabbadie and others.
Naturalization of Francis Vandertyd, Agneta Vandermersch, Henry Lowman and James Gabriel Le Tresor.	11 Will. 3. c. 37 Pr.	11 April 1700
An Act for naturalizing Francis Vander-Tyd, Agneta Vander-Mersh, Henry Lowman, and James Gabriel Le Tresor.
Naturalization of Isaac Delagard, John Batero and others.	11 Will. 3. c. 38 Pr.	11 April 1700
An Act for naturalizing Isaac De la Garde, John Baterow, and others.

=== Sources ===
- Raithby, John, ed. (1963) [1820]. "11° Gul. III.". Statutes of the Realm. Vol. 7: The Statutes of King William III (1695–1701). London: Dawsons. pp. 544–634 – via HathiTrust.
- Raithby, John, ed. (1820). Statutes of the Realm. Vol. 7: 1696-1701 – via British History Online.
- Pickering, Danby, ed. (1764). "Anno undecimo Gulielmi III". The Statutes at Large. Vol. 10: From the Eighth Year of King William III to the Second Year of Queen Anne. Cambridge: Joseph Bentham. p. 300 – via Internet Archive.
- Pickering, Danby, ed. (1764). "Anno undecimo & dudecimo Gulielmi III". The Statutes at Large. Vol. 10: From the Eighth Year of King William III to the Second Year of Queen Anne. Cambridge: Joseph Bentham. pp. 300–355 – via Internet Archive.
- Journals of the House of Commons. Vol. 13. London: His Majesty's Stationery Office. 1803. pp. 1–322 – via Google Books.
- Chronological Table of and Index to the Statutes. Vol. 1: To the End of the Session 59 Vict. Sess. 2 (1895) (13th ed.). London: Her Majesty's Stationery Office. 1896. p. 81 – via Google Books.
- "Chronological Tables of the Private and Personal Acts: Part 5 (1695–1701)". legislation.gov.uk. The National Archives.

== See also ==
- List of acts of the Parliament of England
