= Duchess of Gordon =

Duchess of Gordon is a title given to the wife of the Duke of Gordon. Women who have held the title include:

- Henrietta Gordon, Duchess of Gordon (née Mordaunt, c. 1688–1760), wife of Alexander Gordon, 2nd Duke of Gordon
- Catherine Gordon, Duchess of Gordon (née Gordon, 1718–1779), wife of the 3rd Duke
- Jane Gordon, Duchess of Gordon (née Maxwell, 1748/49–1812), wife of the 4th Duke
- Elizabeth Gordon, Duchess of Gordon (née Brodie, 1794–1864) wife of the 5th Duke
