= Staats Long Morris =

British Army officer and politician (1728–1800)

General Staats Long Morris
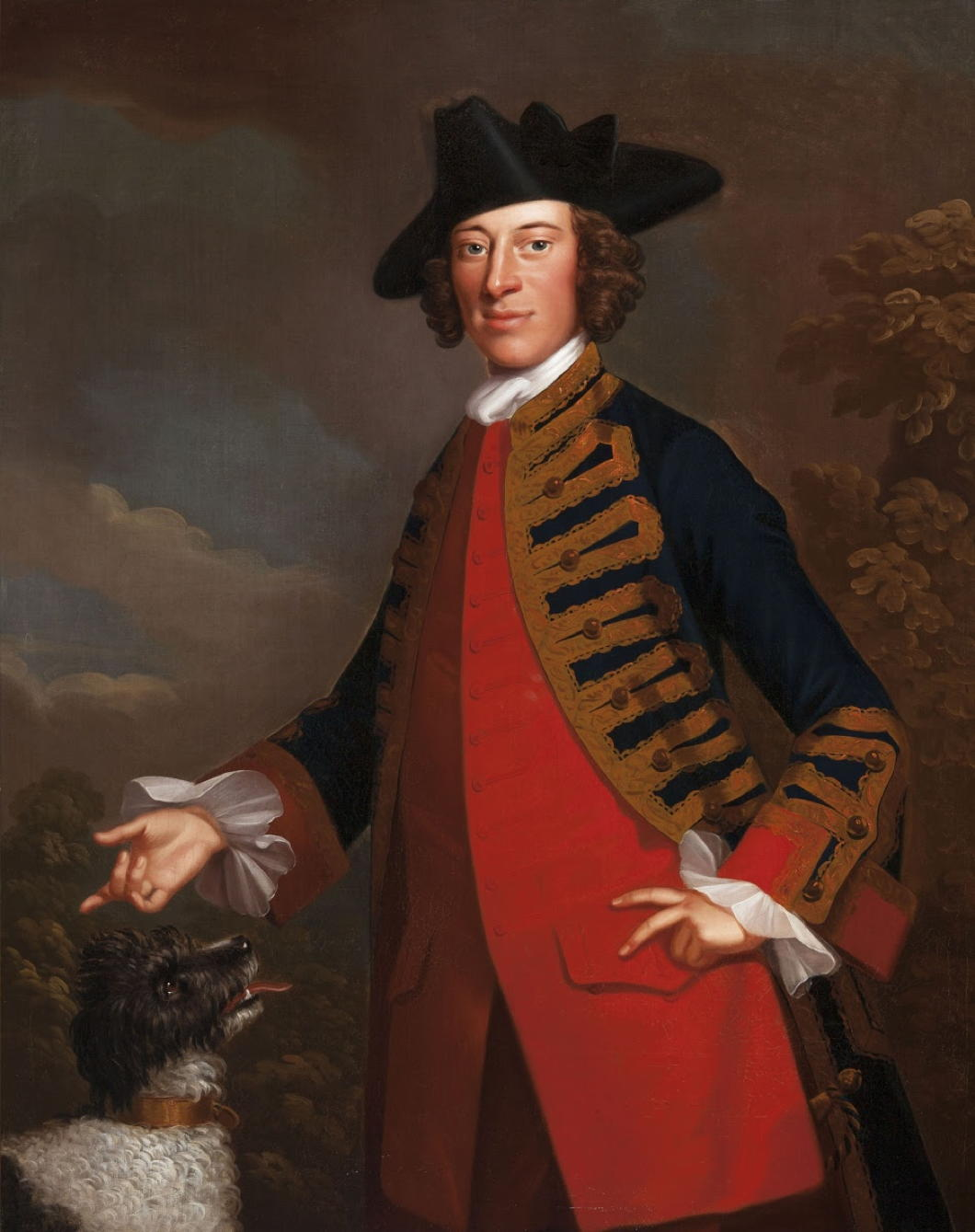
- Portrait by John Wollaston, c. 1749–1752

Member of Parliament for Elgin Burghs
- In office 1774–1784
- Preceded by: Thomas Lockhart
- Succeeded by: William Adam

Governor of Quebec
- In office 1797–1800
- Monarch: George III
- Preceded by: James Johnston
- Succeeded by: William Goodday Strutt

Personal details
- Born: 27 August 1728 Morrisania, New York
- Died: 2 April 1800 (aged 71) England
- Resting place: Westminster Abbey, London
- Spouse(s): Duchess of Gordon (m. 1756); Jane Urquhart (m. 1780)
- Parent(s): Lewis Morris; Katryntje Staats
- Education: Yale College

Military service
- Allegiance: Great Britain
- Branch/service: British Army
- Years of service: 1746–1800
- Rank: General
- Unit: 50th Regiment of Foot
- Commands: 89th Regiment of Foot; 61st Regiment of Foot
- Battles/wars: Seven Years' War

General Staats Long Morris (27 August 1728 – 2 April 1800) was a British Army officer and politician who represented Elgin Burghs in the House of Commons of Great Britain from 1774 to 1784. He also served as governor of Quebec from 1797 until his death. Born in the colony of New York, Morris parlayed a marriage to a Scottish noblewoman into a successful career as a military officer and politician in the British Parliament.

Born in the town of Morrisania, New York, Morris graduated from Yale College in 1746 before embarking on a military career, serving as an army officer in an independent company of the British Army stationed in New York. A protege of the British colonial administrator William Shirley, a journey with him to England in 1756 led Morris to meet and marry the widowed Catherine Gordon, Duchess of Gordon, who significantly advanced her husband's career in the British army.

After serving in India from 1762 to 1763 during the Seven Years' War, Morris focused his attentions on American affairs, receiving 10,000 acres (4,000 ha) of land grants in Canada. Morris also began to develop a political career, entering Parliament in 1774 thanks to a friendship with the 4th Duke of Gordon. When war broke out between Britain and its North American colonies in 1776, Morris, a Loyalist, avoided service in North America.

His wife died in 1779 and Morris remarried a year later. He was promoted to general in 1796 and appointed the governor of Quebec in 1797. The position was a sinecure and Morris remained in England while holding the governorship, which he continued to do until his death at the age of 71. Morris was buried in Westminster Abbey, one of the few Americans to be accorded such an honor.

== Early life ==
Staats Long Morris was born on 27 August 1728 in the town of Morrisania, New York. His father, Lewis Morris Jr., was a politician, judge and landowner who served as the speaker of the New York General Assembly from 1737 to 1738 and sat on the High Court of the Admiralty of New York from 1737 to 1762. Morris' mother was Katryntje (also known as Tryntje) Staats, who was the daughter of New Amsterdam doctor Samuel Staats.

Morris was sent by his father to study at Yale College in Connecticut alongside his brothers Richard and Lewis, entering the college in 1743 and graduating three years later in 1746. The same year that he graduated, Morris' grandfather Lewis, who served as governor of New Jersey from 1738 to 1746, died. His father remarried to Sarah Gouverneur in the same year as well (Katryntje had died in 1731, when Morris was three years old).

After graduating from Yale, Morris was commissioned into one of the British Army's independent companies stationed in New York at the rank of lieutenant. When the royal governor of Massachusetts, William Shirley, raised the 50th Regiment of Foot in 1754 during the French and Indian War, Morris was promoted to captain and placed in command of one the regiment's companies. When Shirley became Commander-in-Chief, North America, Morris served as one of his aides-de-camp.

== Career in Britain and India ==
In 1749, Shirley was temporarily recalled to Great Britain, and Morris followed him there as well. While staying in Britain, Morris met and eventually married widowed Scottish noblewoman Catherine Gordon, Duchess of Gordon, the widow of Cosmo Gordon, 3rd Duke of Gordon, on 25 March 1756. As noted by British historians Lewis Namier and John Brooke, the Duchess had been searching for an eligible bachelor "for some time."

At the time of their marriage, Morris was only at the rank of captain in the British Army and ten years her junior, which according to English historian Stephen Conway "raised [eyebrows] in polite society". After marrying the Duchess, Morris made a brief visit to North America before returning to Britain in November 1759, settling down in his wife's personal residence of Gordon Castle and establishing himself as the consort of the Duchess.

The marriage led to Morris acquiring significant political influence, rising to the rank of major two years later. In 1759, the Duchess persuaded King George II to allow Morris to raise a Highland regiment in the traditional territories of the Clan Gordon, a region she was familiar with. This was done as a means of both advancing her husband's military career and countering the political influence of the Argyll family (vis-à-vis the Gordon family).

Recruitment efforts for the new regiment, spurred on by the reputation of the Duchess, were so successful that within a few weeks 960 recruits had been assembled at Gordon Castle. In December 1759, the recruits marched from the castle to Aberdeen, where they were organised into the 89th Regiment of Foot. Morris, who had been promoted to the rank of lieutenant-colonel, was made the regiment's commander and held control over the distribution of commissions. Fellow military officer Hector Munro, 8th Laird of Novar served under him in the regiment at the rank of major.

To the dismay of the Duchess, the regiment was ordered to sail to India as part of the Seven Years' War, embarking in November 1761. Morris himself did not leave England until April 1762, when he finally travelled to India and joined his regiment, which was stationed in the Bombay Presidency. The regiment was described by Scottish historian Frank Adam as "having acquitted itself in a most exemplary manner" during its existence. In December 1763, Morris returned to England, and his regiment followed him in the next year, before being disbanded in 1765.

== Later life and death ==
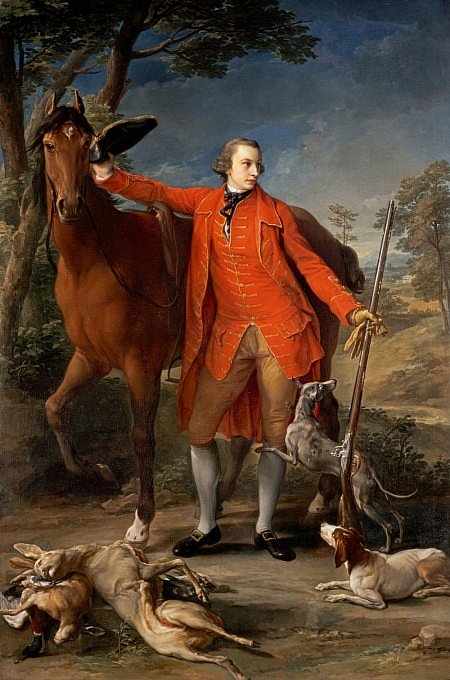
Lord Gordon, who befriended Morris and supported his political career

After the Seven Years' War, Morris revived his interest in North American affairs, applying for land grants in East Florida, Nova Scotia and Quebec in 1765; he was granted 10,000 acres (4,000 ha) in Canada in 1766. In 1768, Morris toured North America alongside his wife, visiting Pennsylvania and New York. Returning to Scotland in 1769, his friendship with the 4th Duke of Gordon helped Morris to be elected to the House of Commons, representing Elgin Burghs from 1774 to 1784.

When the American War of Independence broke out between Britain and the Patriots in 1776, Morris, a Loyalist, offered to resign, but officials in Whitehall instead assigned him to the British garrison on Minorca "so that he would not be forced to fight on his native soil." Morris was promoted to major general in 1777 and made an application to command the 50th Regiment of Foot, which was unsuccessful despite being supported by British Prime Minister Lord North.

In 1777 Morris was appointed as the colonel of the 61st Regiment of Foot. In Parliament, Morris was absent from votes on numerous proposed bills, which led George III to instruct Jeffery Amherst, 1st Baron Amherst to write to Morris insisting that he attend parliament more frequently. Persuaded by Amherst, Morris increased his attendance in Parliament, becoming a strong supporter of the North ministry. In the 1780 general election, Morris successfully kept his seat.

After his wife died in 1779, Morris remarried to Jane Urquhart in 1780. Morris remarrying so soon led relations between him and the 4th Duke of Gordon to quickly deteriorate, and by 1788 Morris was said to be "at variance with the Duke". Upon Sarah Gouvernour's death in 1786, Morris inherited her family estate, which had been partially damaged by British forces during the American Revolution. Expressing no interest in the property, Morris quickly sold it to his half-brother, Gouverneur.

In 1796, Morris was promoted to the rank of general, and was appointed governor of Quebec the next year, succeeding General James Johnston. The position was a sinecure and Morris remained in England while holding the position, which he continued to do until his death in office three years later on April 2, 1800 at the age of 71. The governorship of Quebec was succeeded by Major-General William Goodday Strutt. Morris' corpse was eventually interred in Westminster Abbey, one of the few Americans to be accorded such an honor.

== Personal life, family and legacy ==
Morris was born into a prominent Anglo-American colonial family whose members had long been influential in the English colonization of both New York and New Jersey. However, the American Revolutionary War divided the members of the Morris family, though American historian Richard Brookhiser has noted that Morris was the only member of his family to support the Loyalist cause; his brothers all supported the Patriots, with Richard resigning from his position as a judge during the American Revolution rather than continue to serve under a British colonial administration.

Though his marriage to the Duchess initially proved to be controversial among British high society, according to a 1781 edition of the English Chronicle, Morris "conducted himself in this new exaltation with so much moderation, affability and friendship that the family soon forgot the degradation the Duchess had been guilty of by such a connexion [sic], and received her spouse into their perfect favour and esteem." Morris was also the stepfather of infamous politician Lord George Gordon, famous for his role in initiating and leading the anti-Catholic Gordon Riots of 1780.

After his father's death, Morris received half of his estate, which partially consisted of extensive landholdings in Westchester County, New York. As noted by historian William Howard Adams, his stepmother Sarah was only given a life interest in Morris' half of his father's estate due to distrust from her stepsons Lewis and Richard, who prevented her from receiving an increased share of her late husband's estate. When she died in 1789, the life interest passed to Morris, who eventually sold it to Gouverneur along with the New York landholdings he had received from his father.

Not soon after Morris died on 2 April 1800, his wife Jane died on 15 March 1801 at the age of 52; she was buried alongside him in Westminster Abbey. The original full-sized gravestone for the couple was replaced by a "very small and barely legible" replacement stone following the repaving of the Westminster Abbey nave in 1834 which only mentions Jane and not Morris. English historian Tony Willoughby speculates that a similar replacement stone was installed for Morris, though he also noted that as of 2018 any such stone was not present in Westminster Abbey.

Military offices
Preceded by John Barlow	Colonel of the 61st Regiment of Foot; 1778–1800	Succeeded by Sir George Hewett, 1st Baronet
Parliament of Great Britain
Preceded by Thomas Lockhart	Member of Parliament for Elgin Burghs; 1774–1784	Succeeded by William Adam
