= William Gordon (British Army officer, born 1736) =

British general and courtier

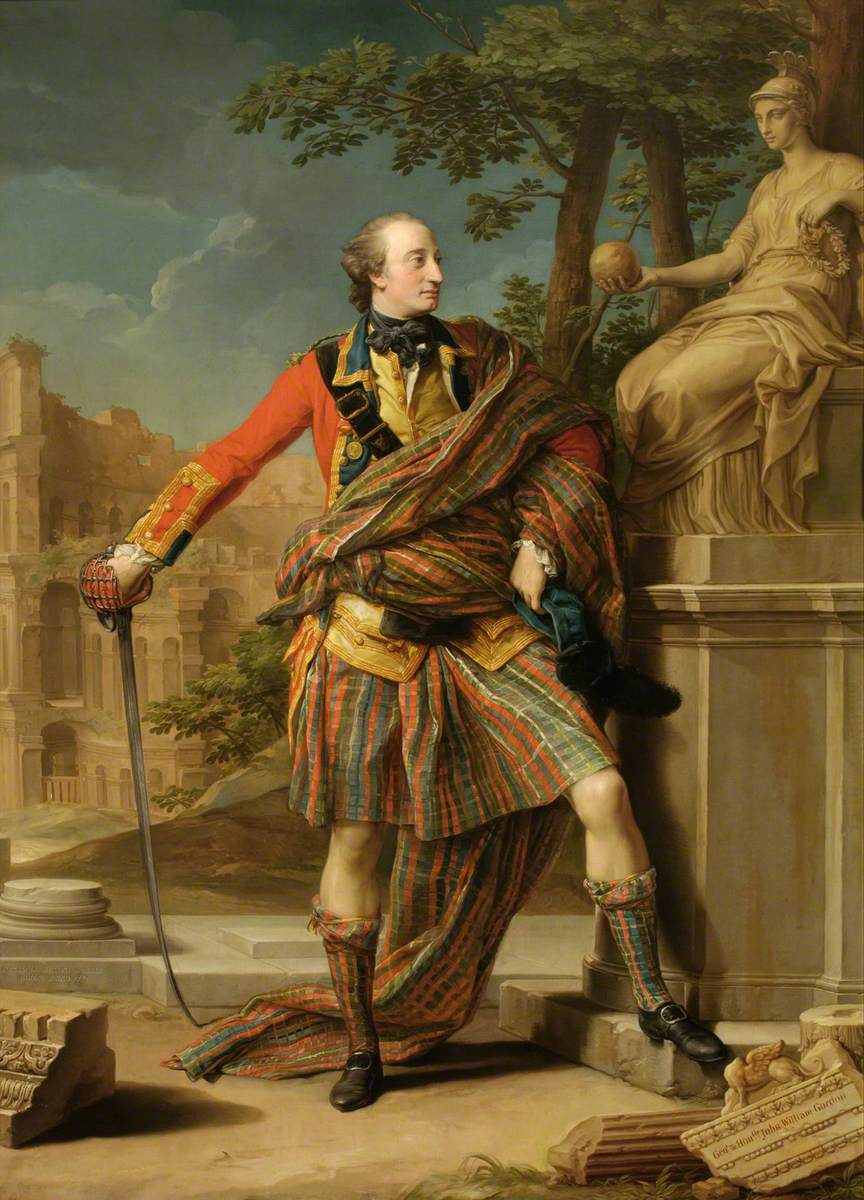
- Portrait of William Gordon by Pompeo Batoni, 1765–1766, Fyvie Castle
- Born: 1736
- Died: 25 May 1816 (aged 79–80)
- Military career
- Allegiance: United Kingdom
- Branch: British Army
- Rank: General

General William Gordon (1736 – 25 May 1816), of Fyvie, was a British general and courtier. He was several times returned to Parliament by the interest of the Duke of Marlborough, and precipitated a family quarrel with his nephew, the Duke of Gordon, by commandeering a regiment that the latter was raising.

== Military career ==
He was the son of William Gordon, 2nd Earl of Aberdeen and his third wife Lady Anne Gordon. Educated at the University of Edinburgh, he was commissioned a cornet in the 11th Regiment of Dragoons in 1756. On 11 August 1759, he was appointed to a captaincy in the newly raised 16th Regiment of (Light) Dragoons. Appointed a lieutenant-colonel in the 105th Regiment of Foot (Queen's Own Royal Regiment of Highlanders) on 11 October 1762, he went on half-pay when that regiment was disbanded in 1763.

On his grand tour of Europe, he passed through Rome, where he was painted by Pompeo Batoni in 1765–66, wearing the uniform of the 105th but with his tartan arranged like a toga.

In 1767, Gordon was returned as Member of Parliament for Woodstock, through the influence of his friend the Duke of Marlborough. He was re-elected in 1768; in 1774, Marlborough put him in for Heytesbury instead. In Parliament, Gordon supported the Government, although his attendance was irregular. In 1775, Marlborough obtained for him an appointment as Groom of the Bedchamber to King George III, whom he served until 1812; Gordon was returned again for Heytesbury at the ensuing by-election.

In 1777, Gordon became involved in a family quarrel with his nephew, Alexander Gordon, 4th Duke of Gordon. The Duke had offered to raise a new regiment for the King, with the intent of bestowing the colonelcy upon his brother, Lord William Gordon. King George objected, however, to Lord William, who had disgraced himself by eloping with and then abandoning Lady Sarah Bunbury. Gordon of Fyvie seized the opportunity to write to Lord Germain to request the colonelcy, assuring him of his nephew's support. He was breveted a colonel on 29 August 1777 and appointed colonel of the regiment on 19 December. However, the Duke discovered that Gordon of Fyvie had already chosen the officers of the regiment and written to them before he even knew if he would get the command; and the appointments, he thought, were arranged so as to threaten his electoral influence in Aberdeenshire. Ultimately, the Duke prevailed upon the King to raise a Fencible regiment under his personal command, but the competition in recruiting that followed created a permanent breach between the Duke and Fyvie's branch of the family, including his brother Sandy.

Gordon remained a consistent supporter of the Government when not absent with his regiment. During the Gordon Riots of 1780, provoked by his nephew Lord George Gordon (then also an MP), Gordon of Fyvie asked him if he meant to admit the mob to the House of Commons and threatened to run him through with his sword if he did. Marlborough did not put him up for Heytesbury in the 1780 election, and Gordon made no attempt to contest Aberdeenshire.

He was promoted major general on 19 October 1781. His regiment was disbanded in 1783, and he again went on half-pay. Gordon was appointed colonel-commandant of the 4th Battalion of the 60th Regiment of Foot on 3 October 1787, of the 7th Regiment of Foot (Royal Fuzileers) on 29 October 1788, and to the 71st (Highland) Regiment of Foot on 19 April 1789. Gordon was promoted lieutenant general on 12 October 1793 and general on 1 January 1798. He was appointed to the colonelcy of the 21st Regiment of Foot on 6 August 1803, which he commanded until his death.

He lived at Martins Heron House at Winkfield in Berkshire. He married his housekeeper Isobel Black, by whom he had already had a son, William Gordon (? - 09-Jan-1847).

Parliament of Great Britain
Preceded by The Viscount Bateman; Anthony Keck	Member of Parliament for Woodstock; 1767–1774; With: The Viscount Bateman 1767–68; Lord Robert Spencer 1768–71; John Skynner 1771–74	Succeeded by John Skynner; William Eden
Preceded by Charles FitzRoy-Scudamore; William à Court	Member of Parliament for Heytesbury; 1774–1780; With: William à Court	Succeeded by William Eden; William à Court
Military offices
New regiment	Colonel of the 81st Regiment of Foot (Aberdeenshire Highland Regiment); 1777–1783	Regiment disbanded
Vacant	Colonel-Commandant of the 4th Battalion, 60th (Royal American) Regiment of Foot; 1787–1788	Succeeded by James Rooke
Preceded by Richard Prescott	Colonel of the 7th Regiment of Foot (Royal Fuzileers); 1788–1789	Succeeded by The Duke of Kent
Preceded by Lord MacLeod	Colonel of the 71st (Highland) Regiment of Foot; 1789–1803	Succeeded by Sir John Cradock
Preceded by James Inglis Hamilton	Colonel of the 21st Regiment of Foot (Royal North British Fuzileers); 1803–1816	Succeeded by The Lord Forbes
