= Catherine Gordon, Duchess of Gordon =

Scottish noblewoman

Her Grace The Duchess of Gordon

Personal details
- Born: Lady Catherine Gordon; 20 October 1718 Haddo, Aberdeenshire
- Died: 10 December 1779 (aged 61)
- Spouses: Cosmo Gordon, 3rd Duke of Gordon (m. 1741; died 1752) Staats Long Morris (m. 1756)
- Relations: John Murray, 1st Duke of Atholl (grandfather); George Gordon, 3rd Earl of Aberdeen (brother); William Gordon (brother); Alexander Gordon, Lord Rockville (brother)
- Children: 6, including the 4th Duke of Gordon, Lord William, Lord George
- Parent(s): William Gordon, 2nd Earl of Aberdeen; Lady Susan Murray

Catherine Gordon, Duchess of Gordon (20 October 1718 – 10 December 1779), was the wife of Cosmo George Gordon, 3rd Duke of Gordon, and the mother of the 4th Duke. After the duke's death, she married General Staats Long Morris.

== Early life ==
Lady Catherine was born at Haddo near Tarves in Aberdeenshire. She was a daughter of William Gordon, 2nd Earl of Aberdeen, and his second wife, the former Lady Susan Murray. Her elder half sister was Lady Ann Gordon, the first wife of William Dalrymple-Crichton, 5th Earl of Dumfries, 4th Earl of Stair. Her elder brother was George Gordon, 3rd Earl of Aberdeen. After the death of her mother, her father remarried for a third time. Through this marriage, she was an elder half-sister to William Gordon and Alexander Gordon, Lord Rockville.

Her paternal grandparents were George Gordon, 1st Earl of Aberdeen, and his wife Anne Lockhart. Her maternal grandparents were John Murray, 1st Duke of Atholl and Lady Katherine Douglas-Hamilton (a daughter of William Douglas-Hamilton, 3rd Duke of Hamilton and Anne Hamilton, Duchess of Hamilton).

== Personal life ==
On 3 September 1741, she was married to Cosmo George Gordon, 3rd Duke of Gordon, to whom she was distantly related, at Dunkeld. Cosmo was the eldest son of Alexander Gordon, 2nd Duke of Gordon and the former Lady Henrietta Mordaunt (the only daughter of Charles Mordaunt, 3rd Earl of Peterborough). Together, Lord Gordon and Lady Catherine were the parents of six children, including:

- Lady Susan Gordon (died 1814), who married twice: she had children by her first husband, John Fane, 9th Earl of Westmorland, and two by her second husband, Lt.-Col. John Woodford.
- Alexander Gordon, 4th Duke of Gordon (1743–1827), who married Jane Maxwell.
- Lord William Gordon (1744–1823), who married Hon. Frances Ingram-Shepheard and had one daughter.
- Lady Anne Gordon (1748–?), who married Reverend Alexander Chalmers
- Lady Catharine Gordon (1751–?), who married Thomas Booker
- Lord George Gordon (1751–1793), who died unmarried.

The Duke of Gordon died in 1752. In 1753 she is said to be living in Huntly House on the Canongate in Edinburgh.

In 1754, Horace Walpole described the duchess as looking "like a raw-boned Scottish metaphysician that has got a red face by drinking water", and implied that she had made advances to Stanisław August Poniatowski (the future King of Poland).

=== Second marriage ===
In March 1756, the widowed duchess married Staats Long Morris, an American soldier who had become a British MP. He was the son of Lewis Morris, Speaker of the New York General Assembly, and a grandson of Lewis Morris, governor of New Jersey. In 1759, Catherine decided to raise a new regiment as a career opportunity for her second husband, but they were posted to India. She later went with him to America, where they travelled widely in 1768–9. They then returned to Scotland and set up home at Huntly Lodge. Morris became MP for Elgin Burghs in 1774, largely due to the influence of his stepson, the new Duke of Gordon.
