= 81st Regiment of Foot (disambiguation) =

Three regiments of the British Army have been numbered the 81st Regiment of Foot:

- 81st Regiment of Foot (Invalids), raised in 1757 and renumbered the 71st in 1764
- 81st Regiment of Foot (Aberdeenshire Highland Regiment), numbered the 81st in 1778
- 81st Regiment of Foot (Loyal Lincoln Volunteers), raised in 1793
