= 81st Regiment of Foot (Aberdeenshire Highland Regiment) =

81st Regiment of Foot (Aberdeenshire Highlanders)
- Active: March 1777–April 1783
- Country: Kingdom of Great Britain (1707–1800)
- Branch: British Army
- Type: Infantry

The 81st Regiment of Foot (Aberdeenshire Highland Regiment) was an infantry regiment in the British Army from 1777 to 1783.

It was raised in Aberdeenshire in 1777 as the Aberdeenshire Highland Regiment under the colonelcy of Gen. Hon. William Gordon of Fyvie. His selection as colonel caused a rift in the Gordon family as his nephew Alexander Gordon, 4th Duke of Gordon had previously offered to raise the regiment with the intention of giving the colonelcy to his brother Lord William Gordon. When the regiment was put on the British establishment in 1778 it was renamed the 81st Regiment of Foot (Aberdeenshire Highland Regiment).

The regiment saw service in Great Britain and Ireland but refused to proceed when due to sail to the West Indies in March 1783. The following month it was disbanded in Edinburgh.
