= Susan Montagu, Duchess of Manchester =

Her Grace The Duchess of Manchester
- Born: Lady Susan Gordon; 2 February 1774; Gordon Castle
- Died: 26 August 1828 (aged 54); Middlesex, England
- Burial place: Kimbolton, Cambridgeshire
- Spouse: William Montagu, 5th Duke of Manchester (m. 1793)
- Children: Lady Jane Montagu; George Montagu, 6th Duke of Manchester; Lord William Montagu; Lady Georgiana Baillie; Lady Elizabeth Steele; Susan Hay, Marchioness of Tweeddale; Lady Caroline Calcraft; Lady Emily Montagu
- Parent(s): Alexander Gordon, 4th Duke of Gordon; Jane Maxwell

Susan Montagu, Duchess of Manchester (née Gordon; 2 February 1774 – 26 August 1828), formerly Lady Susan Gordon, was the wife of William Montagu, 5th Duke of Manchester.

== Early life ==
Lady Susan was born at Gordon Castle, the third daughter of Alexander Gordon, 4th Duke of Gordon, and his first wife, the former Jane Maxwell; Jane was noted for having succeeded in making advantageous marriages for all her children. It was said that she went to view the Duke of Manchester's house before meeting him.

== Personal life ==
Susan married the Duke of Manchester in Edinburgh on 7 October 1793. They had eight children:

- Lady Jane Montagu (1794–1815), who died unmarried.
- George Montagu, 6th Duke of Manchester (1799–1855).
- Lord William Francis Montagu (1800–1842), who married Emily, third daughter of James Du Pre, and had children.
- Lady Georgiana Frederica Montagu (1803–1892), who married Evan Baillie of Dochfour and had children.
- Lady Elizabeth Montagu, who married Thomas Steele and had children, including Thomas Montagu Steele.
- Lady Susan Montagu (c. 1801–1870), who married George Hay, 8th Marquess of Tweeddale, and had children.
- Lady Caroline Catherine Montagu (c.1804–1892), who married John Hales Calcraft, MP and had children.
- Lady Emily Montagu (1806–1827), who died unmarried.

=== Estrangement ===
The couple were estranged by 1808, when the duke became governor of Jamaica, and his wife remained in Britain. The duke was notoriously unfaithful, but it was the duchess who became the subject of a scandal when she left him for a footman. They separated and she was given a settlement. An exile from polite society, the duchess died at Bedfont Lodge in Middlesex, in August 1828, at the age of 54. She was buried at Kimbolton.
