= Alexander Gordon, Lord Rockville =

Scottish judge

Sheriff of Kirkcudbright
- In office 1764-1784

Personal details
- Born: 1739
- Died: 13 March 1792 (aged 52–53)
- Spouse: Anne Duff (m. 1769)
- Children: 1+, including William
- Parent: William Gordon (father)
- Relatives: William Gordon (brother); George Gordon (half-brother); Catherine Gordon (half-sister); George Gordon (grandfather); Alexander Gordon (grandfather)

Alexander Gordon, Lord Rockville (1739 – 13 March 1792) was a Scottish judge.

== Life ==
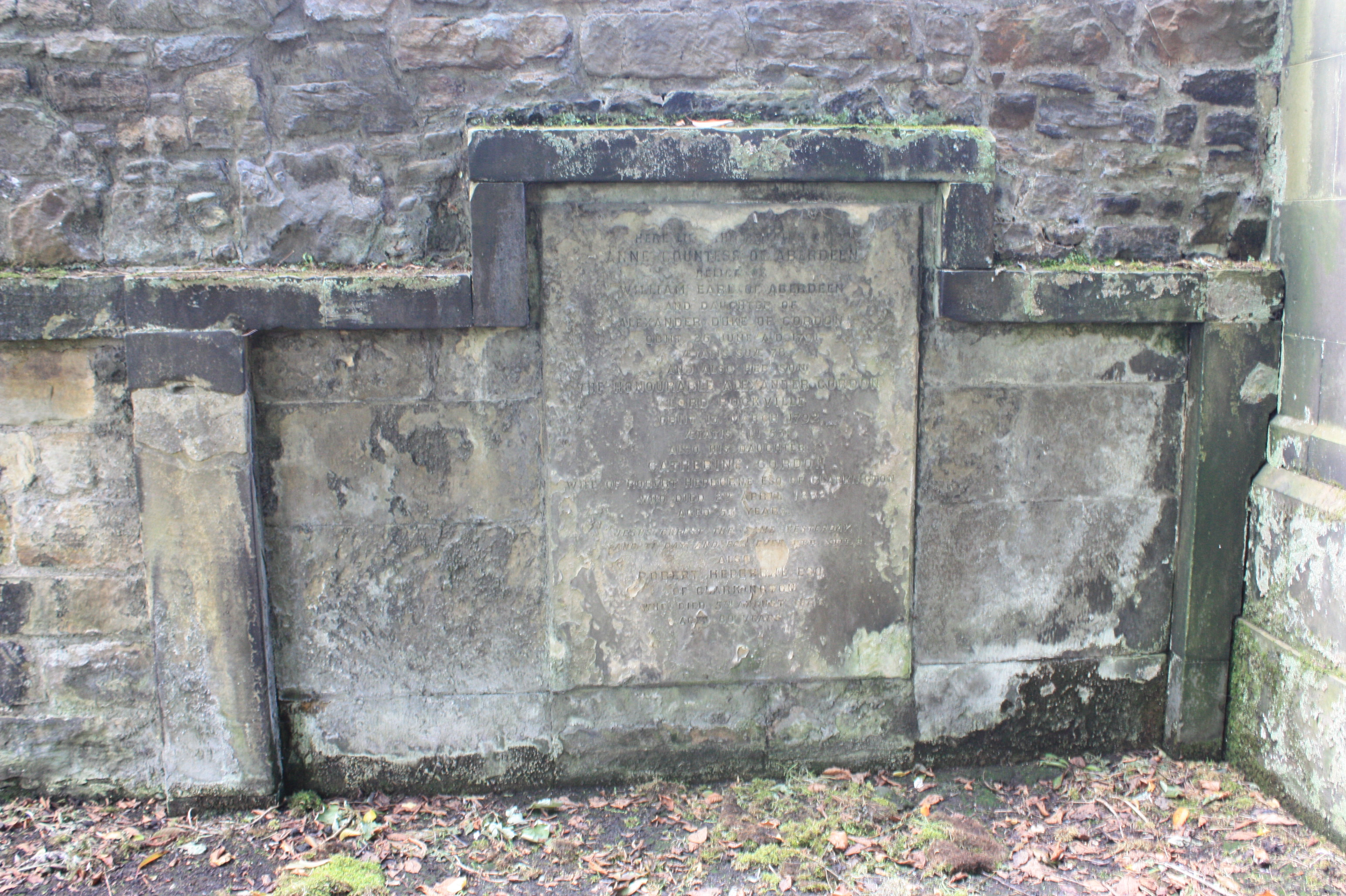
The grave of Alexander Gordon, Lord Rockville, St Cuthberts churchyard, Edinburgh

Rockville was the youngest son of William Gordon, 2nd Earl of Aberdeen. His mother was Lady Anne, daughter of Alexander Gordon, 2nd Duke of Gordon.

He became an advocate 7 August 1759. He served as Sheriff of Kirkcudbright from 1764 to 1784. He was appointed a Lord of Session in 1784, filling the position vacated by the death of David Dalrymple, Lord Westhall and took the judicial title of Lord Rockville after the name of his home in Haddington. He became a Senator in 1788.

He died on 13 March 1792 and is buried in St Cuthbert's churchyard in Edinburgh. The eroded family stone lies in the north-west corner close to the elaborate Gothic Bailey vault.

== Family ==
Rockville married Anne, daughter of William Duff, in 1769. Anne was the widow of William Dalrymple-Crichton, 5th Earl of Dumfries, who had previously been married to Rockville's sister, Anne Gordon.

Rockville and Anne Duff had four sons and four daughters. One of their sons was Sir William Duff-Gordon, 2nd Baronet, MP for Worcester.

He died in March 1792. Lady Rockville died in 1811.

== See also ==
- Marquess of Aberdeen and Temair
- Duff-Gordon baronets
