= William Strutt =

William Strutt may refer to:

- William Strutt (artist), English-born Australian artist
- William Strutt (inventor), English civil engineer, architect and inventor
- William Strutt (politician), member of the Tasmanian Legislative Council
- William Goodday Strutt, British Army officer, governor of Quebec
- John William Strutt, 3rd Baron Rayleigh, "Lord Rayleigh", British mathematician/physicist
