= Lord George Gordon =

British nobleman and politician (1751–1793)

1780 portrait of Gordon

Lord George Gordon (26 December 1751 – 1 November 1793) was a British nobleman and politician best known for lending his name to the Gordon Riots of 1780. An eccentric and flighty personality, he was born into the Scottish nobility and sat in the House of Commons from 1774 to 1780. His life ended after a number of controversies, notably one surrounding his conversion to Judaism, for which he was ostracised. He died in Newgate Prison.

== Early life ==
George Gordon was born in London, third and youngest son of Cosmo George Gordon, 3rd Duke of Gordon, and his wife, Catherine, and the brother of Alexander Gordon, 4th Duke of Gordon. In 1759 he had been bought an ensign's commission in the army's 89th (Highland) Regiment of Foot, then commanded by his stepfather Staats Long Morris, but after completing his education at Eton, he entered the Royal Navy in 1763 at the age of 12. He received promotion to the rank of lieutenant, but his career stagnated and he received no further promotions. His behaviour in raising the poor living conditions of his sailors led to his being mistrusted by his fellow officers, although it contributed to his popularity among ordinary seamen. Lord Sandwich, then at the head of the Admiralty, refused to promise him immediate command of a ship, and he resigned his commission in 1777,without having served during the American War of Independence, which he politically opposed.

== Parliamentary career ==
At the 1774 general election Gordon was returned unopposed as Member of Parliament for Ludgershall. The pocket borough had been bought for him by General Fraser, to fend off Gordon's threat to oppose him in Inverness-shire. Gordon was considered flighty, and was not looked upon as being of any importance. From the moment he entered Parliament he was a strong critic of the government's colonial policy in regard to America. He became a supporter of American independence and often spoke out in favour of the colonies.

His chances of building a political following in parliament were damaged by his inconsistency and his tendency to criticise all the major political factions. He was just as likely to attack the radical opposition spokesman Charles James Fox in a speech as he was to challenge Lord North, the Tory Prime Minister. His chances of being returned at the 1780 general election were overtaken by events. He remained close to political life, and after being acquitted at his trial in 1781, he declared his intention of standing for the City of London, but withdrew.

== The Gordon Riots ==
In 1779 he organised, and made himself head of, the Protestant Association, formed to secure the repeal of the Papists Act 1778, which had restored limited civil rights to Roman Catholics willing to swear certain oaths of loyalty to the Crown.

On 2 June 1780 he headed a crowd of around 50,000 people that marched in procession from St George's Fields just south of London to the Houses of Parliament in order to present a huge petition against (partial) Catholic emancipation. After the mob reached Westminster the "Gordon Riots" began. Initially, the mob dispersed after threatening to force their way into the House of Commons, but reassembled soon afterwards and, over several days, destroyed several Roman Catholic chapels, pillaged the private dwellings of Catholics, set fire to Newgate Prison, broke open all the other prisons, and attacked the Bank of England and several other public buildings. The army was finally brought in to quell the unrest and killed or wounded around 450 people before they finally restored order.

For his role in instigating the riots, Lord George was charged with high treason. He was comfortably imprisoned in the Tower of London and permitted to receive visitors, including the Methodist leader Rev. John Wesley on Tuesday 19 December 1780 who may have shared the condemning opinion of his brother Charles Wesley.

Thanks to a strong defence by his cousin, Thomas Erskine, 1st Baron Erskine, he was acquitted on the grounds that he had had no treasonable intent.

== Imprisonment ==
In 1786 he was excommunicated by the Archbishop of Canterbury for refusing to bear witness in an ecclesiastical suit, and in 1787 he was convicted of defaming Marie Antoinette, Jean-Balthazar d'Adhémar (the French ambassador to Great Britain) and the administration of justice in England. He was, however, permitted to withdraw from the court without bail, and made his escape to the Netherlands. On account of representations from the court of Versailles he was commanded to leave that country, and, returning to England, was apprehended in Birmingham, and in January 1788 was sentenced to five years' imprisonment in Newgate and some harsh additional conditions.

== Conversion to Judaism ==
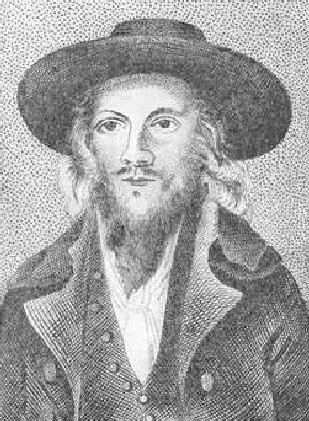
Lord George Gordon after his conversion to Judaism.

In 1787, at the age of 36, Lord George Gordon converted to Judaism in Birmingham (though other sources report the conversion occurred slightly earlier when in Holland in the Netherlands), and underwent brit milah (ritual circumcision; circumcision was rare in England) at the synagogue in Severn Street now next door to Singers Hill Synagogue. He took the name of Yisrael ben Avraham Gordon ("Israel son of Abraham" Gordon—since Judaism regards a convert as the spiritual "son" of the Biblical Abraham). Gordon thus became what Judaism regards as, and Jews call, a "Ger Tsedek"—a righteous convert.

Not much is known about his life as a Jew in Birmingham, but the Bristol Journal of 15 December 1787 reported that Gordon had been living in Birmingham since August 1786:

Unknown to every class of man but those of the Jewish religion, among whom he has passed his time in the greatest cordiality and friendship... he appears with a beard of extraordinary length, and the usual raiment of a Jew... his observance of the culinary (kashrut) laws preparation is remarkable.

He lived with a Jewish woman in the Froggery, a marshy area now under New Street station.

He was surrounded by a number of Jews, who affirmed that his Lordship was Moses risen from the dead in order to instruct them and enlighten the whole world... It appears that (he) has officiated as a chief of the Levitical Order...

While in prison, Gordon lived the life of an Orthodox Jew, and he adjusted his prison life to his circumstances. He put on his tzitzit and tefillin daily. He fasted when the halakha (Jewish law) prescribed it, and likewise celebrated the Jewish holidays. He was supplied kosher meat and wine, and Shabbat challos by prison authorities. The prison authorities permitted him to have a minyan on the Jewish Sabbath and to affix a mezuza on the door of his cell. The Ten Commandments were also hung on his wall.

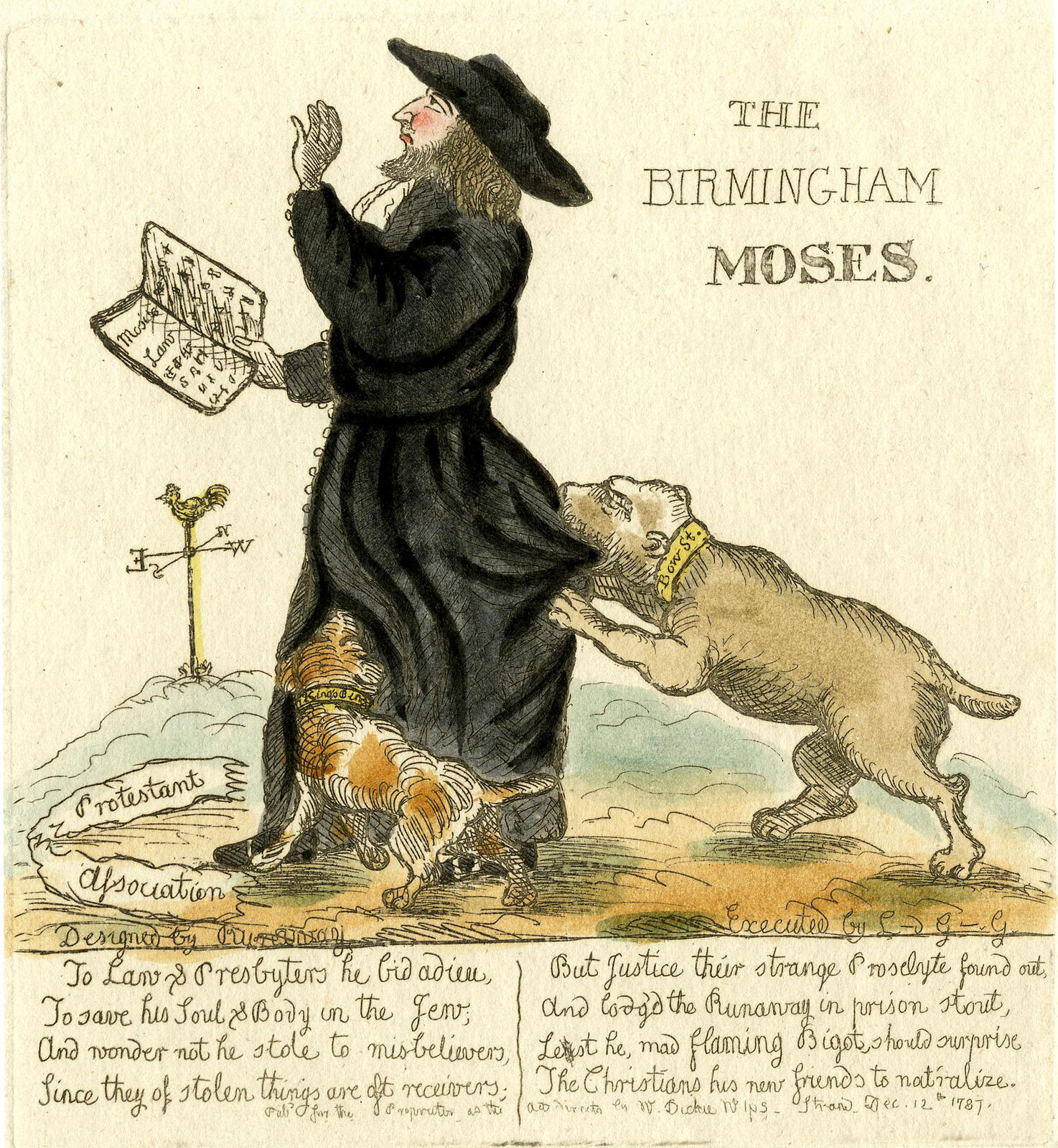
The Birmingham Moses (1787), a satirical print by William Dent

Gordon associated only with pious Jews; in his passionate enthusiasm for his new faith, he refused to deal with any Jew who compromised the Torah's commandments. Although any non-Jew who desired to visit Gordon in prison (and there were many) was welcome, he requested that the prison guards admit Jews only if they had beards and wore head coverings.

He would often, in keeping with Jewish chesed (laws of mercy and charity), go into other parts of the prison to comfort prisoners by speaking with them and playing the violin. In keeping with tzedaka (charity) laws, he gave what little money he could to those in need.

Charles Dickens, in his novel Barnaby Rudge, which centres around the Gordon Riots, describes Gordon as a true tzadik (pious man) among the prisoners:

The prisoners bemoaned his loss, and missed him; for though his means were not large his charity was great, and in bestowing alms among them he considered the necessities of all alike, and knew no distinction of sect or creed ...

On 28 January 1793, Lord George Gordon's sentence expired and he had to appear to give claim to his future good behaviour. When appearing in court he was ordered to remove his hat, which he was using as a kippah, but he refused to do so. The hat was then taken from him by force, but he covered his head with a night cap and bound it with a handkerchief. He defended his behaviour by saying "in support of the propriety of the creature having his head covered in reverence to the Creator." Before the court, he read a written statement in which he claimed that "he had been imprisoned for five years among murderers, thieves, etc., and that all the consolation he had arose from his trust in God."

Although his brothers, the 4th Duke of Gordon and Lord William Gordon, and his sister, Lady Westmoreland, offered to cover his bail, Gordon refused their help, saying that to "sue for pardon was a confession of guilt."

== Death ==
In October 1793, Gordon caught typhoid fever, which had been raging in Newgate prison throughout that year. Christopher Hibbert, another biographer, writes that scores of prisoners waited outside the door to his cell for news about his health; friends, regardless of the risk of infection, stood whispering in the room and praying for his recovery – but George "Yisrael bar Avraham" Gordon died on 1 November 1793 (26 Mar-Cheshvan 5554) at the age of 41.

Most likely fearing desecration, Gordon was not buried in a Jewish cemetery but in the detached burial ground of St James's Church, Piccadilly (an Anglican church from which he had been excommunicated), which was located some way from the church, beside Hampstead Road, 820 metres (900 yd) north of Warren Street – it later became St James's Gardens but from June 2017 onwards its burials were reinterred elsewhere to make way for HS2 expansions to Euston station.

Gordon's life story can be found in Yirmeyahu Bindman's dramatized biography, Lord George Gordon (1992), and a defence of his actions is undertaken in Robert Watson's The Life of Lord George Gordon, with a Philosophical Review of his Political Conduct (1795). He is also one of the subjects included by Hugh MacDiarmid in the volume Scottish Eccentrics (1936). Historical accounts of Lord George Gordon can be found in The Annual Registers from 1780 to the year of his death.

== See also ==
- Anti-Catholicism in the United Kingdom

Parliament of the United Kingdom
Preceded by Peniston Lamb; Whitshed Keene	Member of Parliament for Ludgershall; 2-seat constituency (with Peniston Lamb); 1774–1780	Succeeded by Peniston Lamb; George Augustus Selwyn
