= Thomas Lockhart (MP) =

Scottish lawyer and politician

Thomas Lockhart (1739 – 22 July 1775) was a Scottish lawyer and politician.

Lockhart was the oldest son of Alexander Lockhart, Dean of the Faculty of Advocates. He was educated at the University of Edinburgh, University of St Andrews, at Emmanuel College, Cambridge, at the Inner Temple and at Leiden University.

He became a barrister at the English bar, and in 1771 he was elected to the House of Commons of Great Britain at the Member of Parliament (MP) for Elgin Burghs. A supporter of the administration of Frederick North, he was an infrequent speaker in debates. Lockhart was defeated at the 1774 general election and an election petition lodged on his behalf was rejected after arriving a day too late.

Parliament of Great Britain
Preceded by Sir Andrew Mitchell	Member of Parliament for Elgin Burghs; 1771–1774	Succeeded by Staats Long Morris
