= Christian Learmonth =

Scottish milliner and shopkeeper (1718 – 1762)

- Born: c.1718
- Died: 12 August 1762 (aged 43-44)
- Occupation: Milliner
- Parents: John Learmonth (father); Christian Livingston (mother)

Christian Learmonth (1718 – 1762) was a Scottish milliner and shopkeeper in Edinburgh. Her life is known because of a court case over her will. She left her estate to her lodger and her sisters disputed this.

== Life ==
Learmonth was baptised in 1718. Her mother was Christian Livingston from Parkhall near Falkirk and she died whilst she was a child. Her father was John Learmonth. She was the only girl in a family of five until her father remarried and she gained three half-sisters and a stepmother; Anne Crawford.

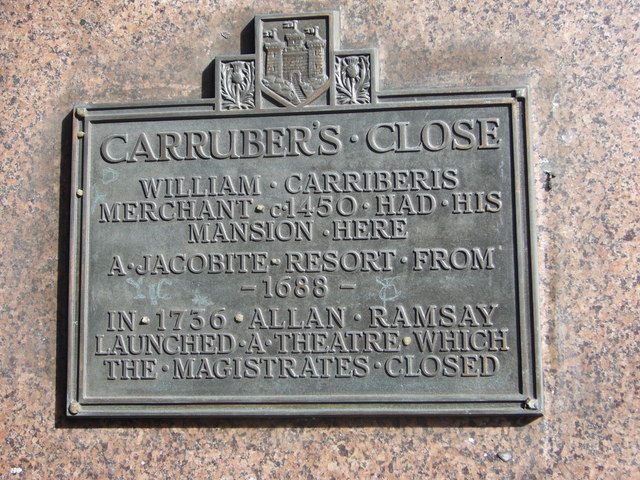
A plaque in Carruber's Close now

Her millinery business was in Lyons Court and she lived nearby in Carrubber's Close off the Royal Mile in Edinburgh. One of her lodgers in Lyons Court was Lady Charlotte Gordon whose father was the second Duke of Gordon. Learmonth's business was assisted by £200 supplied by Lady Gordon and when Learmonth died on 12 August 1762 she left her movable goods to Gordon. The will was dated 20 May 1756. This will was contested by two of her step-sisters, Ann and Jean. They were also milliners.

The dispute went to court and Ma(r)y McCrabie, another milliner, who had known Learmonth since 1745 said that Learmonth had told her that she intended that all of her possessions would go to Gordon after her debts were paid after her death.

The value of her will was £5472 12 shillings and five pence. The value is known as every item was itemised and the list is extant. This gives a detailed insight into her business and the fashion of the time. She created caps and handkerchiefs to order so there is a record of the materials that were used at the time. A similar list exists for Elizabeth Brown(e) of Norwich who was in the same business and these are of great use to historians.
