= William Montagu, 5th Duke of Manchester =

British colonial administrator

Colonel His Grace The Duke of Manchester
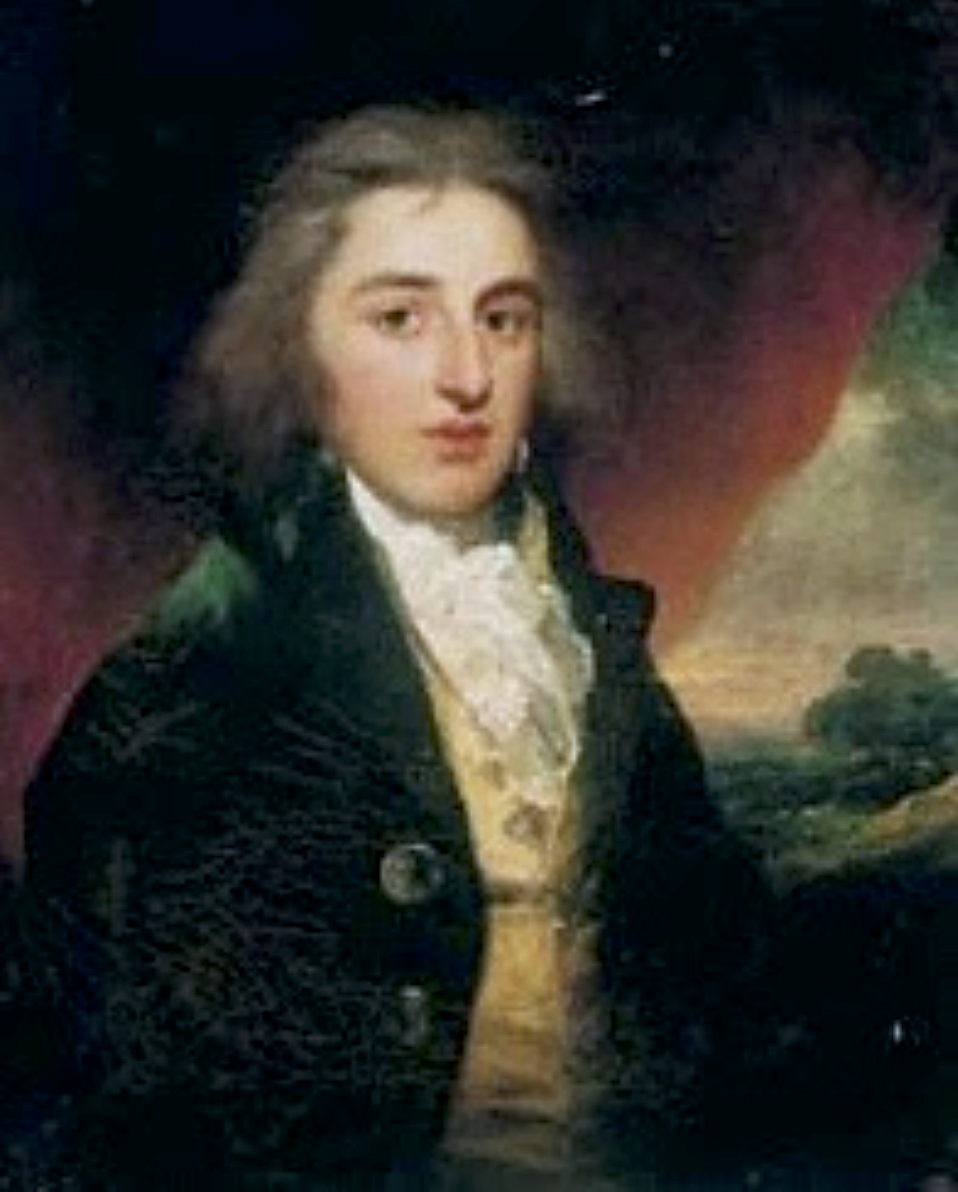
- Portrait by Sir William Beechey

Governor of Jamaica
- In office 1808–1827
- Monarchs: George III; George IV
- Preceded by: Sir Eyre Coote
- Succeeded by: John Keane

Postmaster General
- In office 1827 – 15 November 1830
- Monarchs: George IV; William IV
- Prime Minister: George Canning; The Viscount Goderich; The Duke of Wellington
- Preceded by: Lord Frederick Montagu
- Succeeded by: The Duke of Richmond

Personal details
- Born: 21 October 1771
- Died: 18 March 1843 (aged 71) Rome, Italy
- Spouse(s): Lady Susan Gordon (1774–1828)
- Children: 8, including George
- Parent(s): George Montagu, 4th Duke of Manchester; Elizabeth Dashwood

Colonel William Montagu, 5th Duke of Manchester (21 October 1771 – 18 March 1843), styled Viscount Mandeville until 1788, was a British peer, soldier, colonial administrator and politician. He was Governor of Jamaica from 1808 to 1827, and Manchester Parish was named after him.

== Background and education ==
Manchester was the eldest surviving son of George Montagu, 4th Duke of Manchester, and Elizabeth, daughter of Sir James Dashwood, 2nd Baronet. He was educated at Harrow.

In 1788, he succeeded his father to his titles and the Kimbolton Castle estate in Huntingdonshire.

On the outbreak of the French Revolutionary War the Huntingdonshire Militia was embodied for service, and he was appointed its Colonel, a position he held until his resignation in 1827.

== Political career ==
Manchester was Governor of Jamaica from 1808 to 1827. During his term, he oversaw the implementation of the abolition of the Slave Trade in the colony. In 1815, he dealt with the aftermath of the Port Royal fire and the devastation of Jamaican plantations by a hurricane.

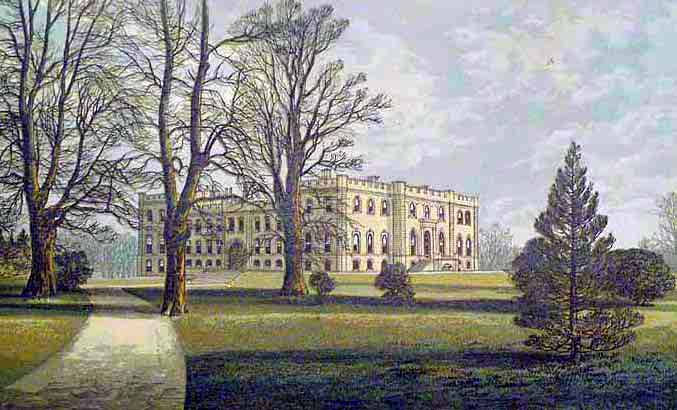
Kimbolton Castle, seat of Duke of Manchester

Manchester Parish in Jamaica was named after him and Mandeville, the capital of the parish, was named after his son, Viscount Mandeville.

After his return to Britain Manchester served as Postmaster General between 1827 and 1830 (succeeding his younger brother Lord Frederick Montagu). He was also Lord Lieutenant of Huntingdonshire between 1793 and 1841.

== Family ==
Manchester married Lady Susan Gordon, third daughter of Alexander Gordon, 4th Duke of Gordon and Jane, Duchess of Gordon, on 7 October 1793. They had eight children:

- Lady Jane Montagu (1794–1815).
- George Montagu, 6th Duke of Manchester (1799–1855).
- Lord William Francis Montagu (1800–1842), married Emily, third daughter of James Du Pre
- Lady Georgiana Frederica Montagu (1803–1892), married Evan Baillie and had issue.
- Lady Elizabeth Montagu, (1795-1857) married Thomas Steele and had issue, including Thomas Montagu Steele
- Lady Susan Montagu (c. 1801–1870), married George Hay, 8th Marquess of Tweeddale and had issue.
- Lady Caroline Catherine Montagu (c. 1804–1892), married John Calcraft and had issue.
- Lady Emily Montagu (1806–1827). Died in Naples while convalescing with Elizabeth Gordon, Duchess of Gordon

The Duchess Susan caused a social scandal by eloping with one of her footmen. According to The Complete Peerage, "it is mentioned in the Memoirs of a Highland Lady, under date 1812, that 'the Duchess had left home years before with one of her footmen.' Lady Jerningham wrote, 6 September 1813: 'the Duchess of Manchester is finally parted from her husband, her conduct becoming most notoriously bad'". Having become a social outcast, Susan died at Eaton, Edinburgh, in August 1828, at age 54, she was buried at Kimbolton.

Manchester survived his wife by fifteen years and died in Rome, Italy, in March 1843, at age 71. He was succeeded in the dukedom by his son, George.

Government offices
Preceded by Sir Eyre Coote	Governor of Jamaica; 1808–1821	Succeeded by Sir John Keane
Political offices
Preceded by Lord Frederick Montagu	Postmaster General; 1827–1830	Succeeded by The Duke of Richmond
Honorary titles
Preceded by The Duke of Montrose	Lord Lieutenant of Huntingdonshire; 1793–1841	Succeeded by The Earl of Sandwich
Peerage of Great Britain
Preceded by George Montagu	Duke of Manchester; 1788–1843	Succeeded by George Montagu
