= Lord William Gordon =

Scottish nobleman

Lord William Gordon (1744–1823) was a Scottish nobleman.

== Background ==
He was the second son of Cosmo Gordon, 3rd Duke of Gordon (1720–1752) and his wife Lady Catherine Gordon (1718 – 10 December 1779), daughter of William Gordon, 2nd Earl of Aberdeen. He was baptised at St Cuthbert's Church in York 21 August 1744. His elder brother was Alexander Gordon, 4th Duke of Gordon (1743–1827). His younger brother was the controversial Lord George Gordon, notorious for the anti-Catholic riots named after him. He also had a sister, Lady Susan Gordon.

== Affair and elopement ==
In the mid-1760s, Lord William had an affair with a married woman, Lady Sarah Bunbury, who had once been courted by King George III. In 1768, he fathered a child upon Lady Sarah, a daughter who was not immediately disclaimed by Sir Charles Bunbury, and received the name Louisa Bunbury. Nevertheless, Lady Sarah and Lord William eloped shortly afterwards, taking the infant with them. Lord William soon tired of his lover's incessant demands for attention, gifts and ceaseless entertainments and abandoned her. Her husband refused to take her back, and Lady Sarah returned to her brother's house with her child, while her husband, Sir Charles, moved Parliament for a divorce on grounds of adultery, citing her elopement, not the birth of Louisa. It was not until 1776 that the decree of divorce was issued. The affair with Lady Sarah ruined both hers and William's social reputation, and also his military and political career. In 1778 he was appointed lieutenant-colonel in his brother's new fencible regiment 'the Northern regiment of Fencible Men' (Gordon's Fencibles).

== Marriage ==
Several years after the Bunbury affair, Lord William married the Hon. Frances Ingram-Shepheard, daughter of Charles Ingram, 9th Viscount of Irvine. They had one daughter, Frances Gordon, who died unmarried. His wife died in 1841.

== Another affair and progeny ==
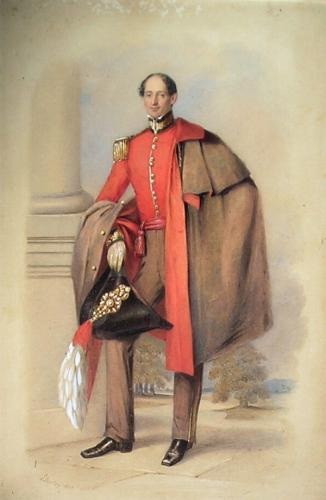
William Conway Gordon (1798–1882) while he was A.D.C. to Sir Peregrine Maitland in Madras

While married to the Hon. Frances, Lord William had another affair and fathered an illegitimate son, William Conway Gordon (1798–1882). He arranged for the boy to receive an education and settled a reasonable income upon him. William Conway Gordon served as ADC to General Sir Peregrine Maitland, a relative by marriage of Lord William, being a distant cousin of the Hon. Frances.

William Conway Gordon entered services for the Bengal Army in 1815, belonging to the 53rd Native Infantry. He married Louisa Vanrenen, daughter of Brigadier-General J. Vanrenen, Honourable East India Company's Service, in Bengal in 1828. They had four children: William George Conway Gordon, Francis Ingram Conway-Gordon, Lewis Conway-Gordon and Charles Van Renen Conway-Gordon. William Gordon was promoted lieutenant in 1851 in the 91st to lieutenant, then captain in 1854. He married Jane Miller Dickson (September 18, 1824 - January 27, 1876) in 1857, and died the following year. Jane Gordon is buried in the English Cemetery, Florence.

== See also ==
- Cousin marriage

Parliament of Great Britain
| Preceded by Arthur Duff | Member of Parliament for Elginshire; 1779–1784 | Succeeded by James Duff |
| Preceded by Archibald Campbell Fraser | Member of Parliament for Inverness-shire; 1784–1790 | Succeeded by Norman Macleod |
| Preceded by Timothy Shelley; Wilson Braddyll | Member of Parliament for Horsham; 1792–1796; With: James Baillie (1792–1793); William Fullarton (1793–1796) | Succeeded by Sir John Macpherson; James Fox-Lane |
