= Governor of Quebec =

The Governor of Quebec was a British Army officer nominally in charge of the garrison at Quebec City. Often the holder of the post was an absentee, and the office was abolished in 1833.

== Governors ==
- 1760–1774: James Murray
- 1774–1797: James Johnston
- 1797–1800: Staats Long Morris
- 1800–1848: William Goodday Strutt

== Lieutenant-Governors ==
- 1797–1799: Patrick Bellew
- 1799–1811: John Callow
- 1811–1813: William Johnson
- 1813–1825: Daniel Paterson
- 1825–1829: Lachlan Maclean
- 1829–1842: William Thomas Dilkes
