= 89th (Highland) Regiment of Foot =

- Active: 13 October 1759 – 1765
- Country: Kingdom of Great Britain (1777–1800)
- Branch: British Army
- Type: Infantry

Commanders
- Colonel of the Regiment: lieutenant-Colonel Staats Long Morris

The 89th (Highland) Regiment of Foot or Morris's Highlanders was an infantry regiment in the British Army from 1759 to 1765.

The regiment was raised during the Seven Years' War in Aberdeenshire and Banffshire by Lieutenant-Colonel Staats Long Morris. Early in 1760, half the regiment embarked for India under the command of Major Hector Munro and were joined by the remainder later in the year. After linking up with the Army at Patna, they took part in the Battle of Buxar in October 1764.

They were disbanded soon afterwards, many of the men joining local East India Company regiments.
