= Thomas Steele (British Army officer) =

General The Right Honourable Sir Thomas Steele GCB
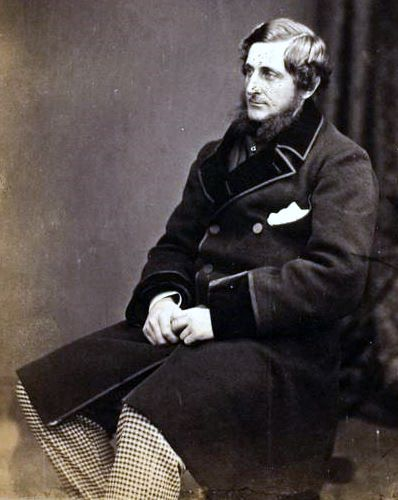
- Steele in 1855, wet plate by Roger Fenton
- Born: 11 May 1820
- Died: 25 February 1890 (aged 69)
- Military career
- Allegiance: United Kingdom
- Branch: British Army
- Rank: General
- Commands: Dublin District; Aldershot Division; British forces in Ireland
- Awards: Knight Grand Cross of the Order of the Bath

General Sir Thomas Montagu Steele GCB PC (Ire) (11 May 1820, Guilsborough, Northamptonshire – 25 February 1890 Frimley Park, Farnborough) was a British army officer.

== Life ==
As the eldest son of Major-General Thomas Steele and Lady Elizabeth Montagu, second daughter of the fifth duke of Manchester, he attended Royal Military College, Sandhurst, before being commissioned as an ensign in the 64th foot in January 1838. Exchanging into the Coldstream Guards on 20 July that year, he served as aide-de-camp to the governor of Madras (1842–48) rose to lieutenant in 1844, captain later that year and brevet lieutenant-colonel in 1851. Promoted to brevet colonel in 1854, he served as Lord Raglan and his successor's military secretary (1854–1855, apart from 5 July to 6 August 1855 when Steele served as assistant adjutant general – in that role he served at the battles of the Alma, Balaklava, Inkerman and Sevastopol, being mentioned in dispatches).

His rewards for his Crimean War service were promotion to brevet colonel (1854) and aide-de-camp to Queen Victoria (1855), appointment as a commander of the Order of the Bath (1855), the Order of the Mejidiye (third class), the Legion of Honour (fifth class), and the order of St Maurice and St Lazarus (second class). He married his first wife Isabel Fitzgerald in 1856 and, on her death 2 years later, he remarried in 1865 to the American Rosalie Malvina McCarty of New York. Steele was promoted to the substantive rank of major in 1860 and the substantive rank of lieutenant colonel in 1862 before retiring to half pay on 24 November 1863. He was promoted to major-general in 1865 and then commanded the troops in the Dublin district (1 April 1872 – 31 March 1874). Promoted to lieutenant general in 1874, he commanded the Aldershot Division (14 April 1875 – 30 June 1880) and, having been promoted to full general in 1877, he commanded the British forces in Ireland (1880–85), finally retiring in 1887. He died in 1890 and was survived by his second wife.

Military offices
Preceded by Sir Horatio Shirley	Colonel of the 61st (South Gloucestershire) Regiment of Foot; 1874–1881	Consolidated into the Gloucestershire Regiment
Preceded by Sir Hope Grant	GOC-in-C Aldershot Division; 1875–1880	Succeeded by Sir Daniel Lysons
Preceded by Sir John Michel	Commander-in-Chief, Ireland; 1880–1885	Succeeded by Prince Edward of Saxe-Weimar
Formed by the Childers Reforms	Colonel of the 2nd Battalion, Gloucestershire Regiment; 1881–1884	Succeeded by Charles Francis Fordyce
Preceded by Sir William Codrington	Colonel of the Coldstream Guards; 1884–1890	Succeeded by Sir Arthur Edward Hardinge
