= William Gordon, 2nd Earl of Aberdeen =

2nd Earl of Aberdeen

William Gordon, 2nd Earl of Aberdeen (1679 – 30 March 1745), known between c. 1691 and 1720 as Lord Haddo, was a Scottish landowner and Tory politician who sat in the British House of Commons briefly from 1708 to 1709 when he was declared ineligible, being the eldest son of a Scottish peer. He showed some Jacobite sympathies, but took no part in the rebellions.

== Early life ==
Gordon was baptized on 22 December 1679, the fourth but eldest surviving son of the George Gordon, 1st Earl of Aberdeen, and his wife Anne Lockhart, daughter of George Lockhart of Torbreck, Sutherland. After the death of his elder brother in 1691, he acquired the courtesy title of Lord Haddo. By about 1705, he had married Lady Mary Melville, the only daughter of the 5th Earl of Leven.

== Career ==
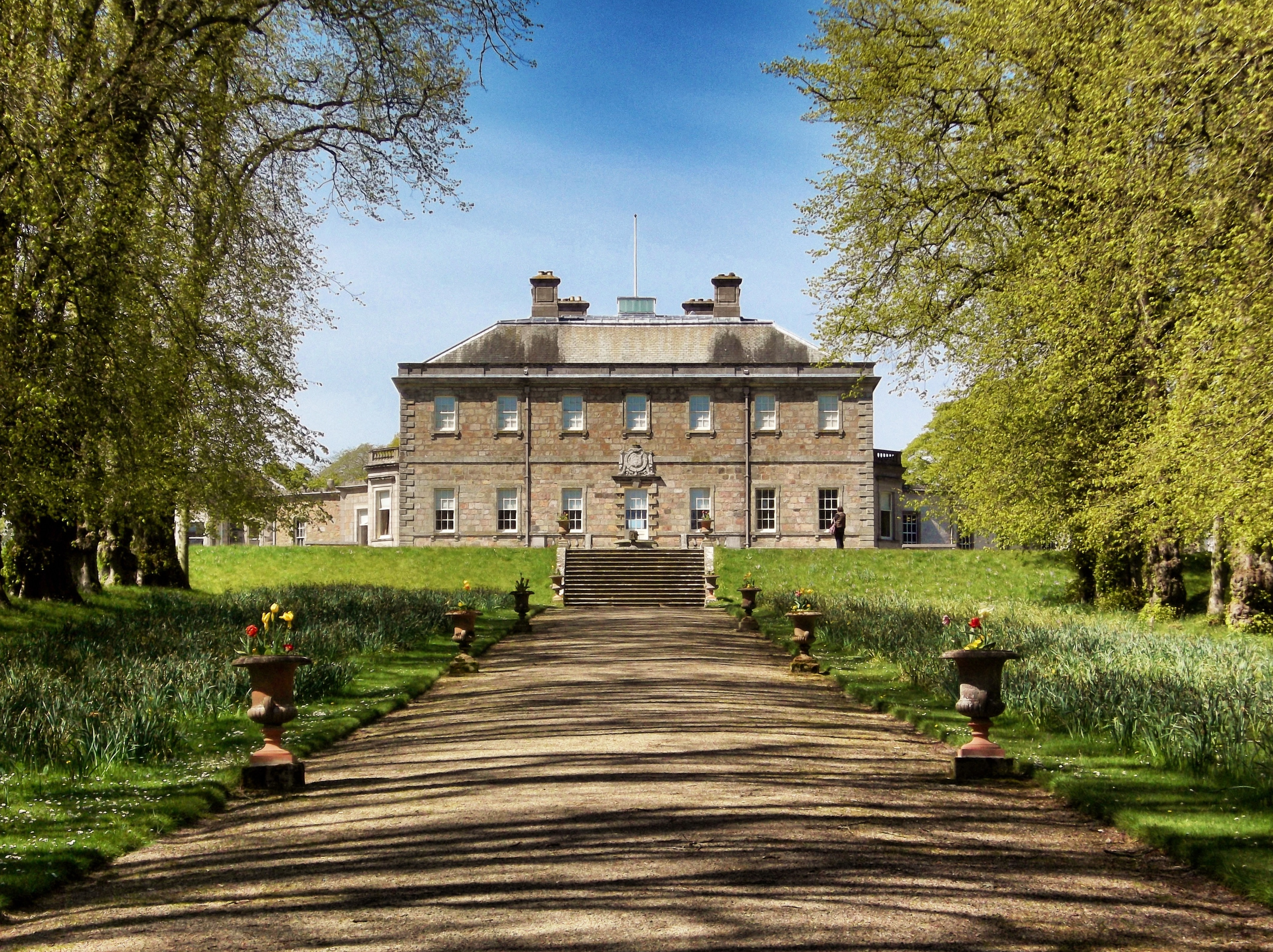
Haddo House

Lord Haddo became a member of the Scottish Privy Council in 1704. After the Acts of Union 1707, the position of Privy councillor was abolished, but he was returned as Member of Parliament for Aberdeenshire at the 1708 British general election. As the eldest son of a peer, however, he was declared ineligible and was replaced by Sir Alexander Cumming, 1st Baronet a year later. His wife Mary died in 1710 giving birth to their second child. After the change of administration in 1710, he applied for a place and was granted an unpaid role as a Scottish Commissioner of chamberlainry and trade in 1711. He lost the post on the Hanoverian succession in 1714. AT the 1715 Jacobite rebellion he retired to Edinburgh and took no part.

In about 1716, Lord Haddo married, as his second wife, Lady Susan Murray, daughter of the 1st Duke of Atholl. In 1718 he was Commissioner for visitation at St Andrews University. He succeeded to his father's titles as Earl of Aberdeen in 1720. In 1721, he was chosen as a Scottish representative peer for the House of Lords. His second wife also died giving birth to their last child and later he married Lady Anne Gordon, daughter of the 2nd Duke of Gordon.

In addition to his political career, Lord Haddo was instrumental in the architectural development of his estates, notably completing Haddo House, near Tarves in Aberdeenshire in 1732, which was designed by William Adam and remains a significant example of early 18th-century Scottish architecture.

== Death and legacy ==
Lord Aberdeen died at Edinburgh on 30 March 1745. He had acquired the estates of Ballogie, Boddam, Crichie, Fedderat, Fyvie, Ruthven and Tarland. He was succeeded by his eldest son, George. His family took no part in the Jacobite rising.

By his first wife Mary, he had two daughters,

- Lady Anne Gordon (1709–1755, married the 5th Earl of Dumfries), and
- Lady Mary Gordon (born and died 1710).

By his second wife Susan he had four children,

- George Gordon, 3rd Earl of Aberdeen (1722–1801),
- John Gordon (died 1727),
- Lady Catherine Gordon (1718–10 December 1779), married her distant cousin, the 3rd Duke of Gordon, and then married Staats Long Morris), and
- Lady Susan Gordon (d. 1725).

By his third wife Anne, he had six children,

- Gen. William Gordon, (died 25 May 1816), Member of Parliament for Woodstock 1767 and for Heytesbury 1774, a Groom of the Bedchamber 1775,
- Col. Cosmo Gordon (d. after 1783)
- Alexander Gordon, Lord Rockville (1739–1792)
- Capt. Charles Gordon (d. 13 December 1771)
- Lady Henrietta Gordon, married as his second wife Robert Gordon, 3rd of Esslemont and 14th of Hallhead on 2 March 1760, and had issue
- Lady Elizabeth Gordon (born 28 October 1734)

Parliament of Great Britain
| Preceded by William Nisbet | Member of Parliament for Aberdeenshire; 1708–1709 | Succeeded by Sir Alexander Cumming, Bt |
Peerage of Scotland
| Preceded by George Gordon | Earl of Aberdeen; 1720–1745 | Succeeded by George Gordon |
