= Cosmo Gordon, 3rd Duke of Gordon =

Scottish peer (1720–1752)

His Grace The Duke of Gordon KT
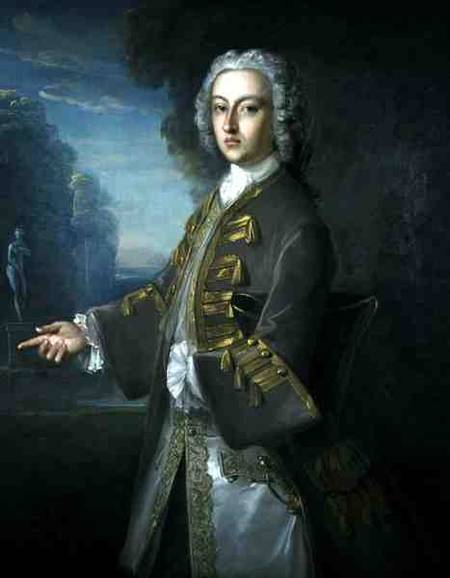
- Portrait, oil on canvas of Cosmo Gordon, 3rd Duke of Gordon (1720–1757) by Philippe Mercier (1689–1760)
- Known for: House of Lords
- Born: 20 April 1720
- Died: 5 August 1752 (aged 32)
- Spouse: Lady Catherine Gordon
- Issue: 6, including Alexander, William, and George
- Parents: Alexander Gordon, 2nd Duke of Gordon; Lady Henrietta Mordaunt

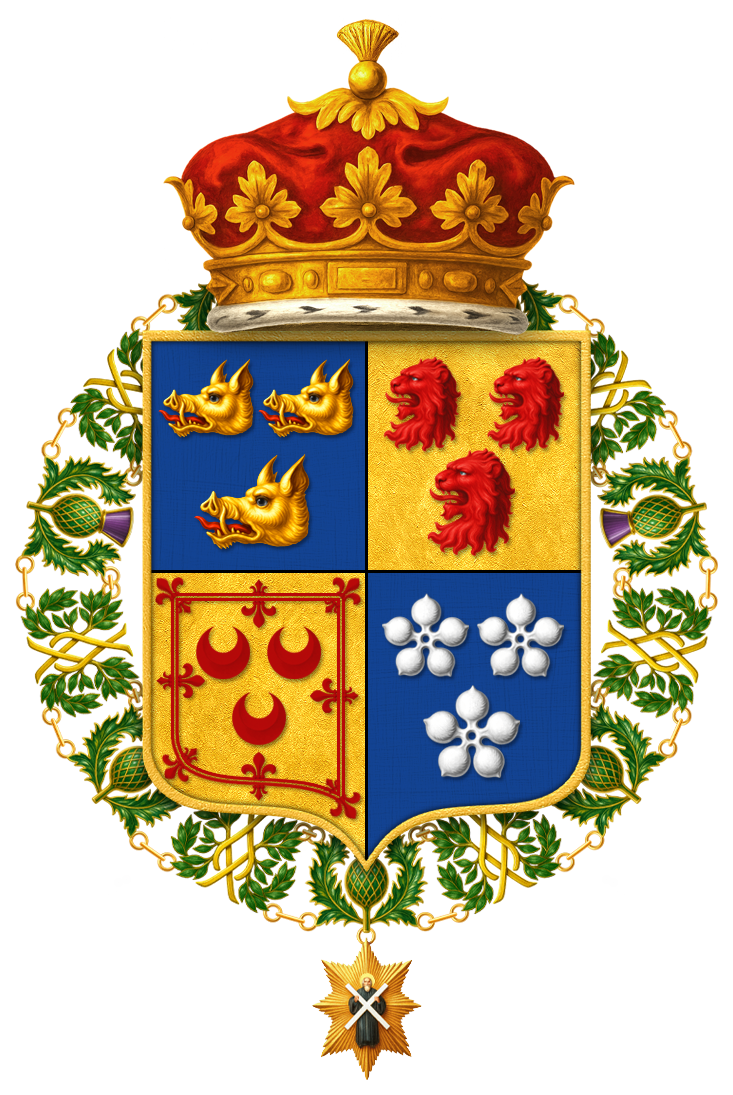
Shield of arms of Cosmo Gordon, 3rd Duke of Gordon KT

Cosmo George Gordon, 3rd Duke of Gordon KT (27 April 1720 – 5 August 1752), styled Marquess of Huntly until 1728, was a Scottish peer.

== Life ==
Gordon was the son of the 2nd Duke of Gordon and was named after his father's close Jacobite friend, Cosimo, Grand Duke of Tuscany. He sat in the House of Lords as a Scottish representative peer from 1747 to 1752. In 1748, he was made a Knight of the Thistle.

== Family ==
Gordon married Lady Catherine Gordon (1718 – 10 December 1779), daughter of William, Earl of Aberdeen, on 3 September 1741. They had three sons and three daughters.

- Alexander, 4th Duke of Gordon (1743–1827)
- Lord William Gordon (1744–1823)
- Lady Anne Gordon (16 Mar 1748 – 7 Jun 1816)
- Lord George Gordon (1751–1793), after whom the Gordon Riots were named
- Lady Susan Gordon (c. 1752 – 1814), married first John, Earl of Westmorland, and second, Colonel John Woodford, having issue from both marriages
- Lady Catherine Gordon (26 Jan 1751 – 3 Jan 1797)

Peerage of Scotland
Preceded by Alexander Gordon	Duke of Gordon; 1728–1752	Succeeded by Alexander Gordon
