= Jane Gordon, Duchess of Gordon =

Scottish Tory political hostess

Her Grace The Duchess of Gordon
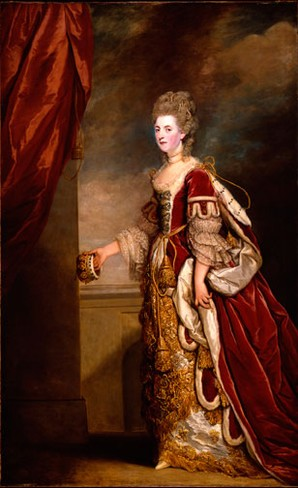
- Portrait by Sir Joshua Reynolds, c. 1775-1778
- Born: Jane Maxwell; 1748 or 1749; Myrton Castle, Monreith
- Died: 14 April 1812; Piccadilly, London
- Spouse: Alexander Gordon, 4th Duke of Gordon (m. 1767; sep. 1805)
- Children: Charlotte Lennox, Duchess of Richmond; George Gordon, 5th Duke of Gordon; Lady Madelaine Palmer; Susan Montagu, Duchess of Manchester; Louisa Cornwallis, Marchioness Cornwallis; Georgiana Russell, Duchess of Bedford; Lord Alexander Gordon
- Parents: Sir William Maxwell, 3rd Baronet; Magdalene Blair

Jane Gordon, Duchess of Gordon (née Maxwell; 1748 or 1749 – 14 April 1812) was a Scottish Tory political hostess. Together with her husband Alexander, 4th Duke of Gordon, and son George, Marquess of Huntly (the future 5th Duke of Gordon), she founded the Gordon Highlanders in 1794, a British Army infantry regiment which existed until 1994. Jane had placed a bet with George, the then-Prince of Wales that she could raise more men than he could. Although 45 by then, she was still extremely attractive, upon which she based her recruiting technique: She wore a military uniform and a large black feathered hat (highland bonnet), touring Scotland to organise reels. Anyone who joined the reel joined the army and received the King's shilling, the recruiting payment, from between the Duchess' lips by kissing her.

== Early life and family ==
Jane was the fourth child of Sir William Maxwell, 3rd Baronet of Monreith, and his wife, Magdalene Blair. She was born at Myrton Castle, the now ruined castle a short distance from Monreith House, the present seat of the family, which was not built until 50 years later. The Monreith Maxwells were closely related to the Maxwells at Caerlaverock, Earls of Nithsdale, who in the 17th century had been considered one of the most powerful families in Scotland. Additionally, their grandmother was the daughter of the 9th Earl of Eglinton, head of the great Ayrshire landowning family and distinguished Member of Parliament.

In 1760, Sir William sold much of his 30,000-acre (120 km^{2}) estate in order to pay debts. In Edinburgh, Jane lived together with her mother and her two sisters in Sir William's Edinburgh house: Shrub Hill on Leith Walk. They may have also rented a second-floor flat in Hyndford's Close near Royal Mile for events in town.

Titled Scottish landowning families often rented apartments in Edinburgh so their girls could receive further education, be launched into Edinburgh society, and attend balls. Lady Maxwell moved there, separate from her husband's household, in 1760 with her three daughters: Catherine, 13; Jane, 11; and Eglantine, 9, the future Lady Wallace of Craigie. Sir William continued to live with his sons at Monreith.

Jane's family lived in humble circumstances in Edinburgh, where the children played in the streets. This was where Jane had an accident as a 14-year-old. She somehow got a finger of her right hand jammed in the wheel of a cart which moved away and tore off the finger. There is at Monreith House a letter written by her after the accident, left-handed, explaining how it happened. After this she wore gloves whenever possible, in which a wooden finger replaced the one missing. One of these wooden fingers is still at Monreith House. In later life she used to explain the loss of the finger by saying it was a coaching accident.

When Jane reached 16, it was said she was so strikingly beautiful that a song was written about her: "Bonnie Jennie of Monreith, the Flower of Galloway". That was also when she fell in love for the first and probably only time. The object of her affections was a young officer who was probably a Fraser, a relative of Lord Lovat. Soon after they met, he left with his regiment, probably to go to America, and word later reached her that he had died.

== Marriage ==
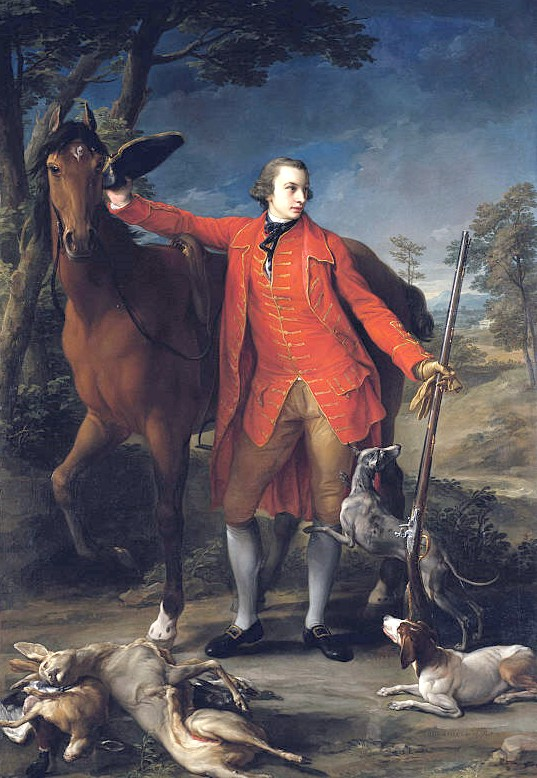
Jane's husband, Alexander Gordon, 4th Duke of Gordon, portrayed by Pompeo Batoni (1764)

On 18 October 1767, Jane married the 24-year-old Alexander Gordon, 4th Duke of Gordon. The young Duke lived in the Gordon townhouse almost opposite the Maxwells, and he had inherited a considerable fortune and the title at the age of nine.

It was while they were on honeymoon at the Fordyces' country seat, Ayton in Berwickshire, that she received a note from her former love, the young Fraser, very much alive, asking her to marry him. She is said to have read the note and fainted. However, she kept in touch with the young Fraser.

For the next 20 years, the Duke and Duchess lived at Gordon Castle in Morayshire, which Jane's husband enlarged to be one of the largest homes in Scotland, with a façade 600 feet (180 m) long and an 84-foot-high (26 m) central tower. Part of the town of Fochabers had to be demolished and rebuilt elsewhere to make room for the extensions. However, years later most of the enlargements were dismantled.

At Gordon Castle, Jane organised parties, planted trees, and took a keen interest in farming. She was a great enthusiast of local dancing and fiddle and pipe music. She is credited with establishing the Strathspey as a dance form.

The couple had seven children. Her first son, George, Marquess of Huntly, later George Gordon, 5th Duke of Gordon, was born in 1770. The Duke also had an illegitimate son at about the same time, also called George, by a Mrs. Christie. Jane used to refer to "my George and the Duke's George".

== Patronage of Robert Burns ==
Jane entertained on an increasingly lavish scale, with as many as 100 sitting down to dinner and guests staying for three months in the Castle. In the 1780s, the Duchess started entertaining in Edinburgh, quickly becoming the leading hostess. Jane was the sole arbitress of fashion in Edinburgh. Horace Walpole called her the "Empress of fashion". She regularly gave soirées where up and coming artists were asked to entertain. It was in her drawing room that Robert Burns first read his poetry to Edinburgh society, and she became his chief sponsor, purchasing all his early published works.

== Relocation to London ==
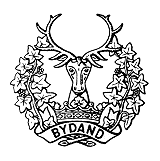
Cap badge of the Gordon Highlanders

In 1787, the Duke and the Duchess of Gordon moved to London. They first rented a house on Downing Street from Lord Sheffield, then one in Pall Mall from the Marquess of Buckingham, and finally one in St. James's Square. And Jane continued her party-giving habit, but with a distinctly Scottish flavour. She made everyone dance Scottish dances. King George III adored her, and she supported the King, so she was allowed to promote her Scottish heritage more than others would have dared. She gave a ball at which she and the Duchess of York dressed in tartan when it was officially banned, and she arranged for the King to inspect troops dressed in tartan in Hyde Park.

It was in the Pall Mall house that she held her greatest parties. Close to Parliament in Westminster, she kept open house for the Tories. Pitt, the Prime Minister, and Dundas, the Lord Advocate, were frequent visitors. And it was during this time that she arranged a truce between the King and his eldest son, the Prince of Wales, whose had run up enormous debts. She arranged for his debts to be met, and this enabled the construction of the Royal Pavilion at Brighton to be continued.

=== Raising of the Gordon Highlanders ===
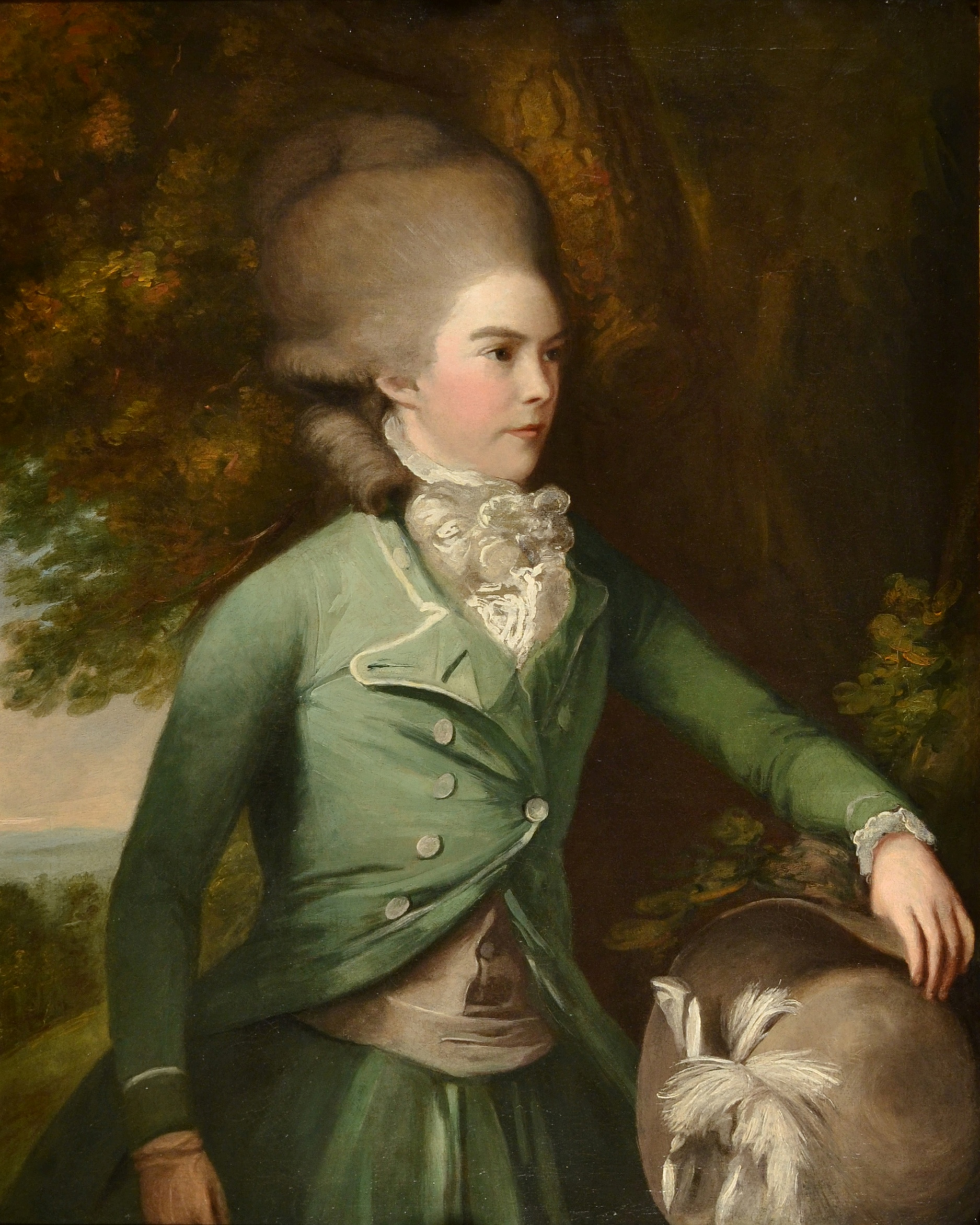
Jane Gordon, Duchess of Gordon, in a green riding dress, portrayed by Daniel Gardner (around 1775)

In 1793, the French Revolutionary Government declared war on Great Britain. At that time the British Army was short of recruits, since the military service was not very popular among the young men. As a consequence, the Government asked Jane's husband, the Duke of Gordon, to raise another regiment. The outcome of this was a bet between Jane and the Prince of Wales, the future King George IV. Jane bet with the Prince that she could raise more men than he, meaning the Government. Although 45 by then, she was still extremely attractive, upon which she based her recruiting technique: She wore a military uniform and a large black feathered hat (highland bonnet), touring Scotland to organise reels. Anyone who joined the reel joined the army and received the King's shilling, the recruiting payment, from between the Duchess' lips by kissing her. This was how the Gordon Highlanders were founded. Her total was 940 men. On 24 June 1794, the newly embodied regiment paraded for the first time at Aberdeen. The regiment existed until 1994.

== Kinrara House ==
In 1799, Jane became depressed and ill. Her eldest son, George, the later George Gordon, 5th Duke of Gordon, had gone off to the wars, and she wrote in a letter to a friend: "Oh where and oh where has my highland laddie gone?" Her second son, Alexander (1785–1808), died at 23, and her husband had moved his mistress, Jane Christie, into Gordon Castle and built a small house on the Spey, called Kinrara, for his estranged wife. Jane lived there for the next six years, continuing her entertaining and partying.

Kinrara House is now a listed building. In its grounds are monuments in memory of Jane Gordon and her son, the 5th Duke.

== Daughters' marriages ==
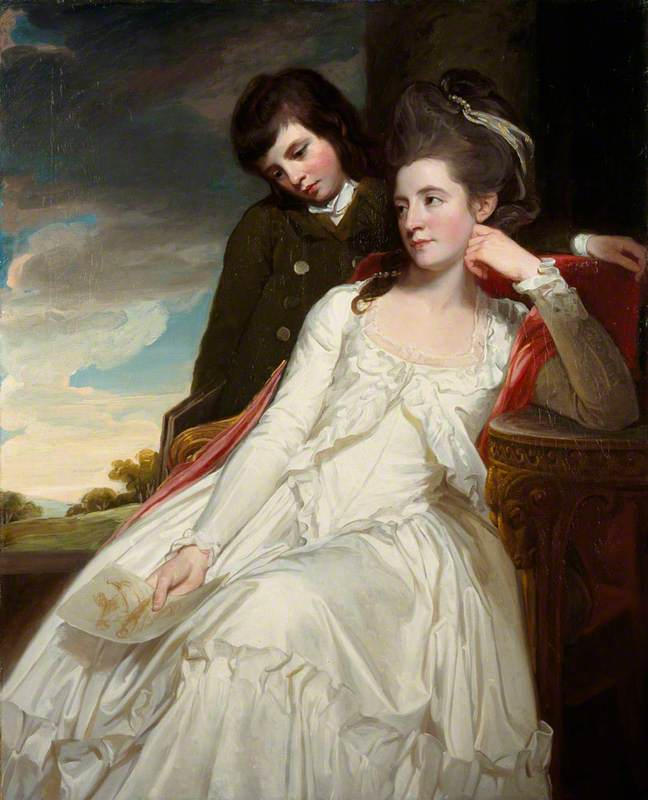
Jane, Duchess of Gordon with her eldest son later 5th duke, by Romney c.1778

Having enjoyed life as a duchess, Jane was determined to get her daughters well married, and she set out securing suitable husbands for them.

Jane first turned to finding a husband for Charlotte (1768–1842), her eldest daughter. She plotted to have her marry William Pitt, the Prime Minister, but her plan failed when Pitt's close friend, Lord Henry Dundas, took an interest in Charlotte. Neither potential husband worked out, and Charlotte later married Colonel Charles Lennox, the future 4th Duke of Richmond, on 9 September 1789 at Gordon Castle.

In 1802, after the Peace of Amiens, she took her youngest daughter, Georgiana (1781–1853), to Paris with a view to marrying her to the son of the Empress Joséphine, Eugène de Beauharnais. This would not have been popular so soon after hostilities, but nothing came of it. A short time later, Georgiana was reputed to be friendly, if not engaged, to Francis Russell, 5th Duke of Bedford, but he died before they could marry. Jane then arranged a meeting with the Duke's younger brother John Russell, 6th Duke of Bedford, who had inherited the title and recently been widowed with several children. All went as planned, and he soon married his late brother's fiancée on 23 June 1803 in London. Georgiana had ten children by the Duke, and she followed in her mother's partying footsteps, entertaining frequently in her Bedford home, Woburn Abbey. The Duchess of Bedford was a great patroness of the arts, and had a long-standing relationship with the painter Sir Edwin Henry Landseer.

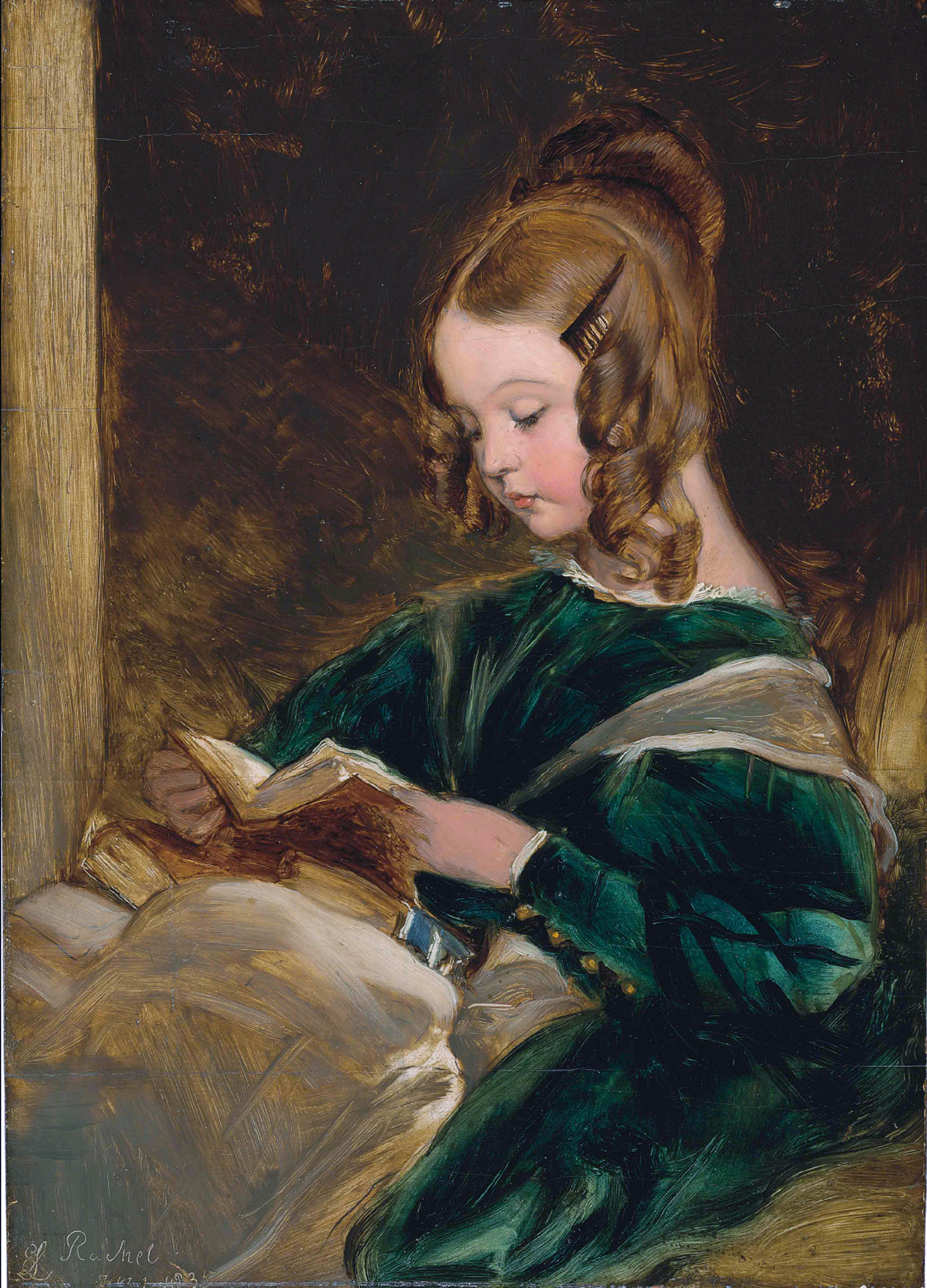
Lady Rachel Evelyn Russell (1826–1898), a granddaughter of Jane, portrayed by Sir Edwin Henry Landseer (1835). It was said that Rachel was the daughter of Jane's daughter Georgiana and Edwin Henry Landseer.

General Cornwallis had returned to England from his disastrous command of the British troops during the American Revolution to be, rather surprisingly, treated as a hero and created a marquess. Having fought with Jane's brother at Plassey in India as well as in the American war, he would have been friendly with Jane; thus, his eldest son, Lord Brome, was considered suitable as a husband for Louisa (1776–1850), the fourth daughter. Cornwallis refused to approve the marriage, however, citing madness in the Gordon family. The Duchess allayed his fears by swearing that there was "not one drop of Gordon blood" in this particular daughter. The marriage then proceeded on 17 April 1795 in London. History does not relate who Louisa's natural father was, but it is thought to have been Captain Fraser, her early love from Edinburgh.

Susan (1774–1828), the third daughter, was married on 7 October 1793 in Edinburgh to William Montagu, 5th Duke of Manchester, and Madeleine (1772–1847), the second daughter, married firstly on 2 April 1789 in London to Sir Robert Sinclair, 7th Baronet. On 25 November 1805 she married secondly at Kimbolton Castle to Charles Fysche Palmer.

== End of her marriage ==
Jane's own marriage had been more or less an arrangement from the beginning. The return from the dead of her first love during the honeymoon was an inauspicious start. The Duke having an illegitimate son by Jane Christie at the same time as his heir was born was an unfortunate sequence, to be followed by the birth of his illegitimate daughter a few years later. The Duke openly kept his mistress at Gordon Castle while the Duchess seems to have preferred assignations with her lover on the windswept moors.

By 1805, the marriage was officially over, and the couple reached a financial agreement whereby the Duchess would be given a new house, capital payments, and generous annual payments. The Duke was by then in financial difficulties, however; he acknowledged his liability to the Duchess, but he did not pay all the monies legally due her.

Jane was reduced to living in hotels, and she became increasingly eccentric. She was involved in an acrimonious dispute with her estranged husband over money, and she died in 1812 at Poultney's Hotel, Piccadilly, London, surrounded by her four daughters and surviving son. Her body was taken north to be buried at the old Celtic Chapel by the banks of the Spey at Kinrara. There her husband carried out her final wish and erected a monument to her on which were recorded the marriages of her children.

== Legacy ==
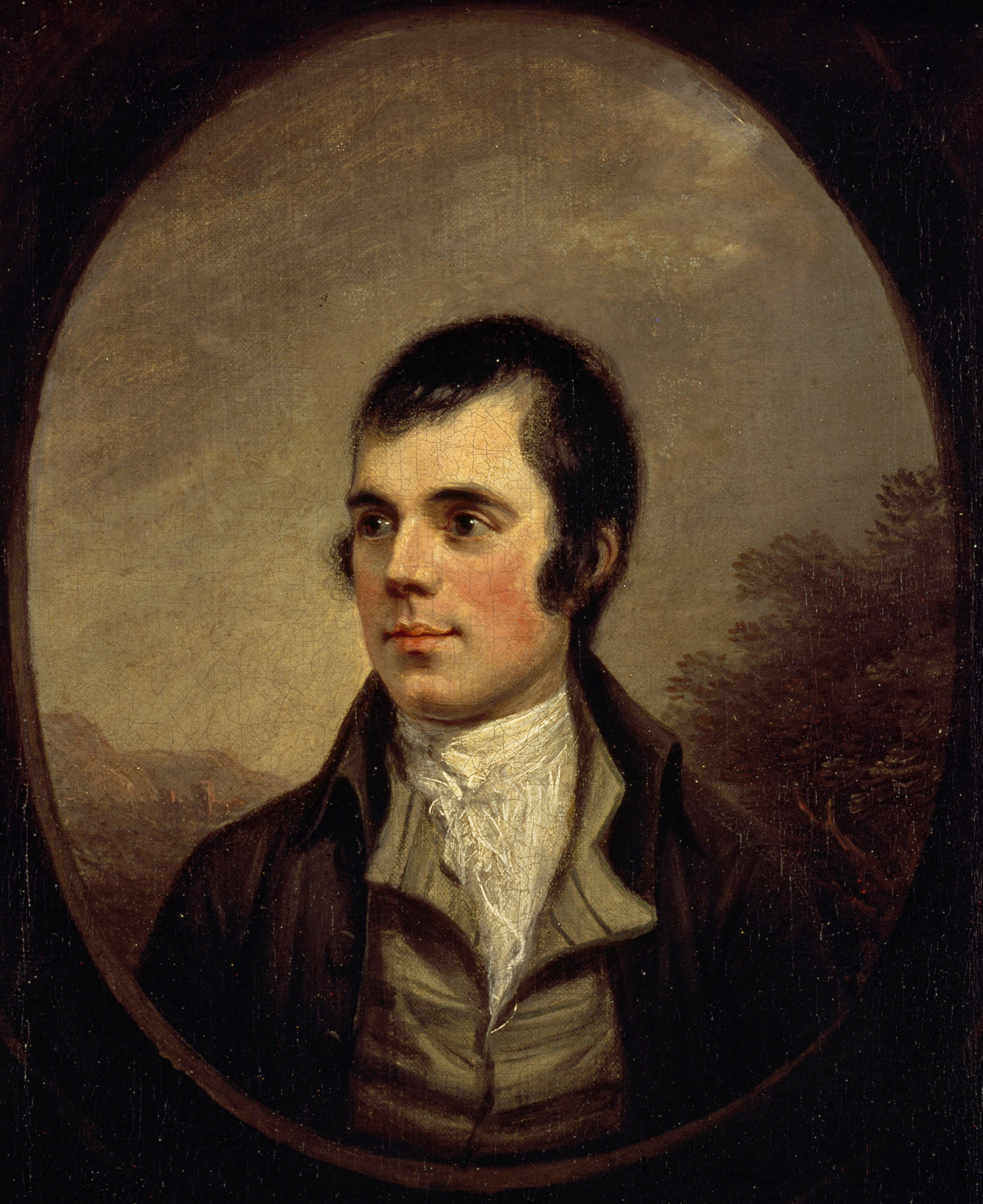
1787 portrait of Robert Burns by Alexander Nasmyth. Jane was one of Burns's most important patronesses, and he thanked her with a poem.

Jane, Duchess of Gordon, was painted by most of the leading English portrait painters like George Romney, Sir Joshua Reynolds, Sir Henry Raeburn and Daniel Gardner, but she was known for her intelligence, infectious laugh, and sense of humour as well as her looks. She appears to have had an enormous amount of energy which she directed towards helping what she considered good causes. She left her mark on history by what she did to get Scotland and Scottish culture accepted by the new Kings of Great Britain with German roots.

She is remembered in the lines of Robert Burns, of whose poetry she was an important early patroness:

She kiltit up her kirtle weel
To show her bonie cutes sae sma',
And walloped about the reel,
The lightest louper o' them a'!

While some, like slav'ring, doited stots
Stoit'ring out thro' the midden dub,
Fankit their heels amang their coats
And gart the floor their backsides rub;

Gordon, the great, the gay, the gallant,
Skip't like a maukin owre a dyke:
Deil tak me, since I was a callant,
Gif e-er my een beheld the like!

== In popular culture ==
Jane Maxwell Gordon is the focus of Ciji Ware's 1989 novel Island of the Swans.

== See also ==
- Jane, Duchess of Gordon (1805 EIC ship)
