= William Goodday Strutt =

British Army officer

William Goodday Strutt (1762–1848) was a British Army officer who served as governor of Quebec.

Strutt was baptised at Springfield, Essex, on 26 February 1762, the second son of John Strutt, of Terling Place, Essex, by Anne, daughter of the Rev. William Goodday of Maldon. Entering the army in 1778, he joined his regiment, the 61st, at Minorca. Later he was appointed to a company in the 91st, and took part in the defence of St. Lucia. In 1782, having exchanged into the 97th, he served at the siege of Gibraltar. On the signing of the preliminaries of peace he purchased a majority in the 60th regiment, and, being placed on half-pay, visited several German courts. In 1787 he was sent with his regiment to the West Indies, where he took an active part in military affairs. Succeeding to a lieutenant-colonelcy by special command of George III, he was removed to the 54th, and went with the army of Lord Moira to Flanders. In 1794 he bore a very distinguished part against the French at Tiel, going through much hard fighting. On his return he was sent to St. Vincent, where he was raised to the rank of brigadier-general. In January 1796, with two hundred men, he attacked a force of twelve hundred, being himself thrice wounded, and losing his right leg. On his return to England he was received with marked favour by the king, and on 23 February 1796 was made deputy governor of Stirling Castle, afterwards serving upon the staff in Ireland. On 23 June 1798 he was raised to the rank of major-general, and on 13 May 1800 he was, as a reward for his services, appointed to the sinecure office of governor of Quebec, and he held that post until his death. He died at Tofts, Little Baddow, Essex, on 5 February 1848, having seen an exceptional amount of military service, both at home and abroad.
