= Alexander Gordon, 4th Duke of Gordon =

British Army officer

His Grace The Duke of Gordon KT PC
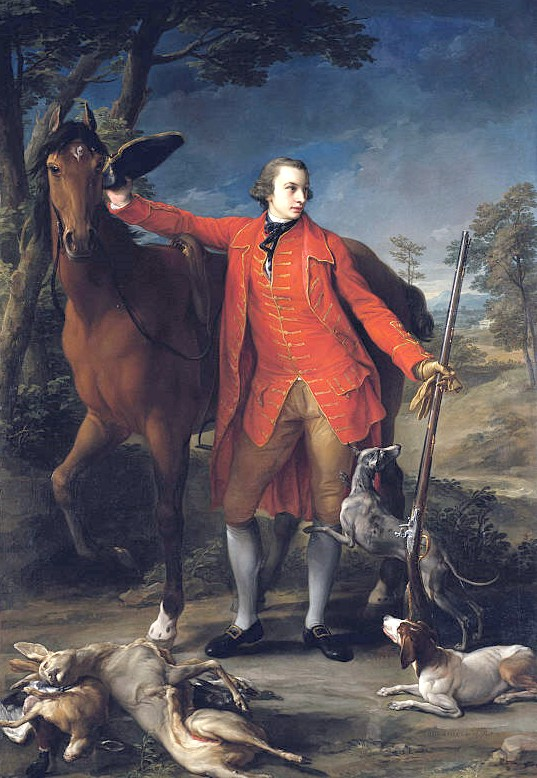
- Portrait by Pompeo Batoni, 1764

Keeper of the Great Seal of Scotland (1794–1806, 1807–1827)
- Preceded by: Cosmo Gordon, 3rd Duke of Gordon
- Succeeded by: George Gordon, 5th Duke of Gordon

Personal details
- Born: 18 June 1743 Gordon Castle, Fochabers, Moray, Scotland
- Died: 17 June 1827 (aged 83) Berkeley Square, London, England
- Spouses: Jane Maxwell; Jane Christie
- Children: Charlotte Lennox, Duchess of Richmond; George Gordon, 5th Duke of Gordon; Lady Madelaine Palmer; Susan Montagu, Duchess of Manchester; Louisa Cornwallis, Marchioness Cornwallis; Georgiana Russell, Duchess of Bedford; Lord Alexander Gordon
- Parents: Cosmo Gordon, 3rd Duke of Gordon; Lady Catherine Gordon

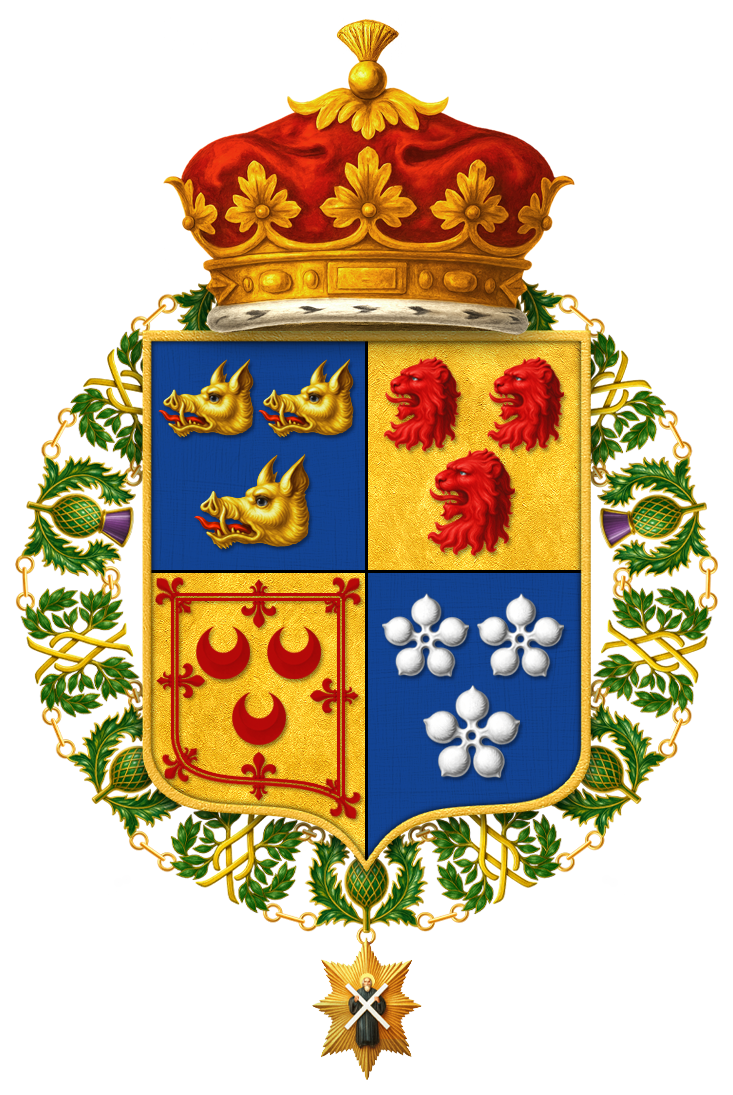
Shield of Arms of Alexander Gordon, 4th Duke of Gordon, KT, PC, encircled by the collar of the Order of the Thistle.

Alexander Gordon, 4th Duke of Gordon, KT (18 June 1743 – 17 June 1827), styled Marquess of Huntly until 1752, was a British Army officer who was described by Lord Kames as the "greatest subject in Britain". He was also known as the "Cock o' the North", the traditional epithet of the chief of Clan Gordon.

== Early life ==
Alexander Gordon was born at Gordon Castle, Fochabers, on 18 June 1743, the eldest son of Cosmo Gordon, 3rd Duke of Gordon, and his wife, Lady Catherine Gordon, daughter of the 2nd Earl of Aberdeen. He was educated at Eton and also possibly at Harrow. He succeeded as 4th Duke of Gordon in 1752. His younger brother was Lord George Gordon, who incited the Gordon riots.

He was elected as a Scottish representative peer in 1767. In 1778 the government allocated funds to raise three fencible regiments in 'North Britain', one of which was the 'Gordon Fencibles' or North Fencibles' raised by Gordon for the Anglo-French War 1778-83, this was disbanded in 1783. He was appointed a Knight of the Thistle in 1775 and was created a Peer of Great Britain as Baron Gordon of Huntley, of Huntley in the County of Gloucester, and Earl of Norwich, in the County of Norfolk, in 1784. His new titles were not universally popular. He was thought to have taken designations to which he had no right. The Scots Peerage described the Gordon of Huntley peerage as "an absurd specimen of Peerage topography. The village of Huntley, four miles from Newent in Gloucestershire, had apparently no connection with the Gordon family or with the town of Huntly in North Britain." George Edward Cokayne in The Complete Peerage says the following with regard to the Duke's choice of Norwich for his earldom: "His great-grandmother was the daughter of the 5th Duke of Norfolk and 1st Earl of Norwich, but though that title had become extinct in 1777, the representation thereof did not vest in the issue of that lady."

He was Keeper of the Great Seal of Scotland from 1794 to 1806 and from 1807 to 1827. Between 1793 and 1827, he was Chancellor of King's College, Aberdeen. In addition, he was Lord Lieutenant of Aberdeenshire until 1808. He received the Order of the Thistle from King George III on 11 January 1775. The Dictionary of National Biography described him thus: "At the time of his marriage the Duke was reputed one of the handsomest men of his day".

He raised the 92nd (Gordon Highlanders) Regiment of Foot in 1794 for the French Revolutionary Wars. He was responsible for establishing the new village of Fochabers as well as those of Tomintoul and Portgordon in Banffshire. He is also credited as the founder of the Gordon Setter breed of dog, having popularised a 200-year-old breed during the 18th century and then formalised its breed standard in 1820.

He was an enthusiastic supporter and patron of the music of William Marshall (1748–1833), a Scottish fiddler and composer, and famous for his many strathspeys, who acted as steward of the Gordon household.

== The Gordon estates ==
The 4th Duke of Gordon took a paternalistic view of his tenants, seeing his estates as a breeding ground for recruits to the army. He was therefore opposed to depopulating the Highlands and averse to removing tenants even when they were unable to pay their rents. However, with his own debts mounting, the Glen Feshie estate was sold to George Macpherson Grant of Ballindalloch in 1815. Glenbanchor was sold to James Macpherson of Belleville in 1822, the money raised going to fund improvements at Huntly.

== Marriage and family ==
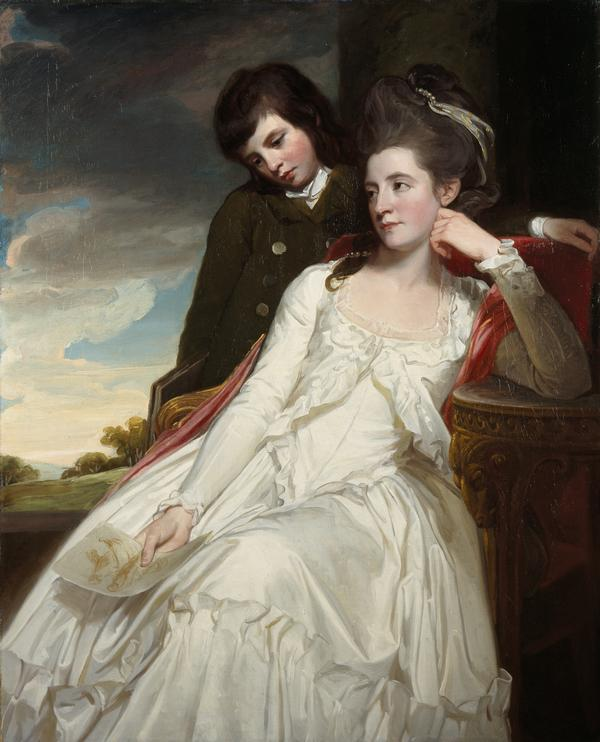
Jane, Duchess of Gordon, with her son George Duncan (1770–1836), by George Romney

Gordon married firstly on 23 October 1767 at Ayton, Scottish Borders, and again at Mr. Fordyce's house in Argyll Street, Edinburgh, Jane, the daughter of the late Sir William Maxwell, 3rd Baronet of Monreith, by his wife, the Lady Magdalen Maxwell, daughter of William Blair, of Blair, Ayrshire. Jane was described by the diarist Sir Nathaniel Wraxall as a celebrated beauty. From 1787 she was part of the social centre of the Tory party and was described in the Female Jockey Club of 1794 as possessing "an open ruddy countenance, quick in repartée, and no one excelling her in performing the honours of the table, her society is generally courted". It went on to say that

"The Duchess triumphs in a manly mien;

Loud is her accent, and her phrase obscene."

She resided for some years in Edinburgh, but eventually refused to renew her residence at George Square, Edinburgh, because it was "a vile dull place". The Hon. Henry Erskine is said to have written the following lines to her:

"That is, quoth he, as if the Sun should say,

A vile dark morning this – I will not rise to-day."

The Duke and Duchess's marriage was tempestuous from the start and neither made any particular effort to be faithful to the other. For some years before her death, she was bitterly estranged from the Duke. While the Duchess circulated at the centre of society, the Duke lived in retirement at Gordon Castle. Elizabeth Grant mentions "The great width of the Spey, the bridge at Fochabers, and the peep of the towers of Gordon Castle from amongst the cluster of trees that concealed the rest of the building....the Duke lived very disreputably in this solitude, for he was very little noticed, and, I believe, preferred seclusion."

The Duchess is best remembered for placing the King's shilling between her teeth to help recruitment to the Gordon Highlanders which were founded by her husband. However, she also possessed a capacity for match-making which was unrivalled. Of her five daughters, three were married to Dukes (Richmond, Manchester and Bedford) and one to a Marquess (Cornwallis).

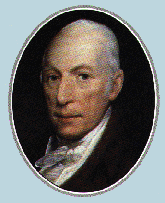
An older Duke of Gordon

The Duchess of Gordon died at Pulteney's Hotel, Piccadilly, Middlesex, on 14 April 1812 and was buried at her beloved Kinrara near Aviemore. After her death Alexander married at the Kirk of Fochabers (probably Bellie) in July 1820, Jane [or Jean] Christie, who was a native of Fochabers and was then aged about 40. Alexander had previously had four children by her. After their marriage, she lived in great style, not at the castle, but at a townhouse in Fochabers. She claimed that by residing at the Castle, which the Duke had rebuilt and enlarged considerably, none of his friends would visit him.

One of the Duke's illegitimate sons, Colonel Charles Gordon, was given the property of Glasterim near Port Gordon. Curiously, Colonel Gordon had been a great favourite with the late Duchess. Elizabeth Grant described Colonel Gordon as "much beloved by Lord Huntly, whom he exceedingly resembled, and so might have done better for himself and all belonging to him, had not the Gordon brains been of the lightest with him".

Jane died on 17 June 1824. The Duke himself died suddenly at Mount Street, Berkeley Square, on 17 June 1827, and was buried in Elgin Cathedral. He was succeeded by his son George Gordon, 5th Duke of Gordon.

== Legitimate issue ==
The Duke had a total of seven children by his first wife:

- Lady Charlotte Gordon (Gordon Castle, 20 September 1768 – London, 5 May 1842); married 9 September 1789 at Gordon Castle, Charles Lennox, 4th Duke of Richmond, and had issue. She was the hostess of the Duchess of Richmond's Ball—"the most famous ball in history", and eventually inherited all of the vast estates of the Gordon family.
- George Gordon, 5th Duke of Gordon (Edinburgh, 2 February 1770 – London, 28 May 1836); married 11 December 1813 at Bath, Somerset, Elizabeth Brodie. No issue.
- Lady Madelaine Gordon (Gordon Castle, 23 March 1772 – 31 May 1847); married firstly 2 April 1789 in London Sir Robert Sinclair, 7th Baronet (died August 1795), and had issue; married secondly 25 November 1805 at Kimbolton Castle Charles Fysche Palmer of Luckley Park, Berkshire with no issue.
- Lady Susan Gordon (Gordon Castle, 2 February 1774 – Bedfont Lodge, 26 August 1828); married 7 October 1793 in Edinburgh, William Montagu, 5th Duke of Manchester, and had issue. Elizabeth Grant of Rothiemurchas in her Memoirs of a Highland Lady noted in 1812 that "the Duchess [of Manchester] had left home years before with one of her footmen", while Lady Jerningham wrote in September 1813 that "The Duchess of Manchester is finally parted from her husband, her conduct being most notoriously bad".
- Lady Louisa Gordon (Gordon Castle, 27 December 1776 – Park Crescent, Middlesex, 5 December 1850); married 17 April 1795 in London, Charles Cornwallis, 2nd Marquess Cornwallis, and had issue. Allegedly, when the Marquess had "expressed to the Duchess of Gordon some hesitation about marrying her daughter on account of the supposed insanity in the Gordon family, he received from the Duchess the gratifying assurance that there was not a drop of Gordon blood in Louisa."
- Lady Georgiana Gordon (Gordon Castle, 18 July 1781 – Nice, 24 February 1853); married 23 June 1803 in London John Russell, 6th Duke of Bedford, and had issue.
- Lord Alexander Gordon (1785 – 8 January 1808); served as an officer in the British Army, unmarried.

== In popular culture ==
Gordon has twice been depicted incorrectly as fighting at the Battle of Waterloo: in the 1970 film Waterloo, where he was played by Rupert Davies, and the Dad's Army episode A Soldier's Farewell, where he was played by John Laurie.

Political offices
| Preceded by The Earl of Marchmont | Keeper of the Great Seal of Scotland; 1794–1806 | Succeeded by The Earl of Lauderdale |
| Preceded by The Earl of Lauderdale | Keeper of the Great Seal of Scotland; 1807–1827 | Succeeded by The Duke of Argyll |
Honorary titles
| New office | Lord-Lieutenant of Aberdeenshire; 1794–1808 | Succeeded by Marquess of Huntly |
Peerage of Scotland
| Preceded by Cosmo Gordon | Duke of Gordon; 1752–1827 | Succeeded by George Gordon |
Peerage of Great Britain
| New creation | Earl of Norwich; 1784–1827 | Succeeded by George Gordon |
| New creation | Baron Gordon of Huntley (descended by acceleration); 1784–1807 | Succeeded by George Gordon |
Peerage of England
| Preceded by Mary Mordaunt | Baron Mordaunt; 1819–1827 | Succeeded by George Gordon |
