= Alexander Gordon, 2nd Duke of Gordon =

Scottish Jacobite peer (c. 1678–1728)

His Grace The Duke of Gordon
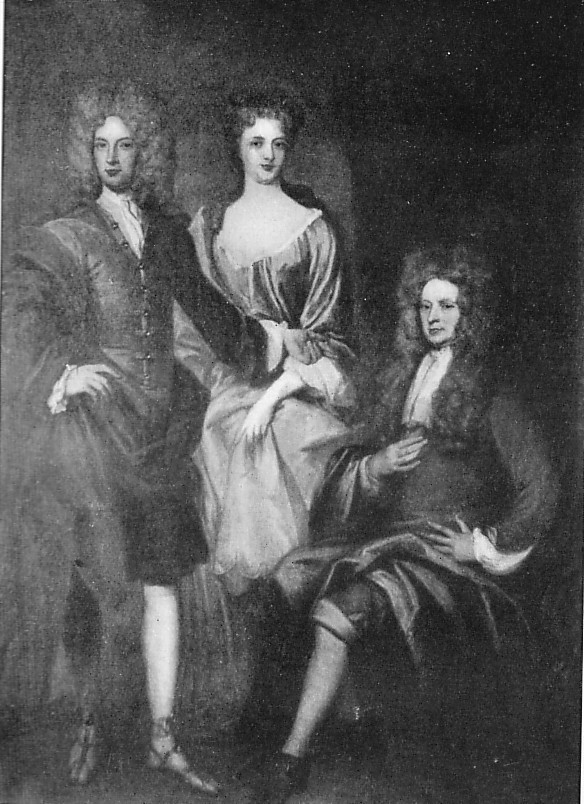
- A portrait of Alexander Gordon (standing, with Jean Gordon, later Jean Drummond, Duchess of Perth), and (seated), George Gordon, 1st Duke of Gordon
- Born: 1678
- Died: 28 November 1728 (Age 49-50)
- Spouse: Lady Henrietta Mordaunt (m. 1707)
- Children: 8, including Cosmo
- Father: George Gordon, 1st Duke of Gordon

General Alexander Gordon, 2nd Duke of Gordon (c. 1678 – 28 November 1728), styled Earl of Enzie until 1684 and the Marquess of Huntly from 1684 to 1716, was a Scottish Jacobite peer.

Gordon was the son of George Gordon, 1st Duke of Gordon and Lady Elizabeth Howard, the daughter of the Roman Catholic Henry Howard, 6th Duke of Norfolk. He fought with the Jacobites at the battle of Sheriffmuir, with three hundred horsemen and two thousand foot. On 12 February 1716, he surrendered at Gordon Castle to John Gordon, 16th Earl of Sutherland. He was imprisoned at Edinburgh, but obtained a pardon when his father died and entered his inheritance as 2nd Duke on 7 December 1716.

He is mentioned in the Jacobite riddling song Cam Ye o'er frae France, referred to as "Cockalorum", an epithet derived from the traditional nickname of the head of the Gordon clan, "Cock o' the North"

== Family ==
Gordon married Lady Henrietta Mordaunt (ca. 1688–1760), daughter of Charles Mordaunt, 3rd Earl of Peterborough, before 13 February 1707; they had issue.

- Elizabeth married Rev John Skelly
- Catherine (1713–1791) married 7th Earl of Wemyss
- Anne (d.1786) married 2nd Earl of Aberdeen
- Cosmo George, 3rd Duke of Gordon (1721–1752)
- Lewis Gordon (1724–1754)
- Charlotte Gordon, invested in Edinburgh millinery business
- General Lord Adam Gordon (1728–1801) married Jean, daughter of Alexander Drummond of Lennoch and Megginch.
- Lord Charles Gordon (1721–1780)

Peerage of Scotland
Preceded by George Gordon	Duke of Gordon; 1716–1728	Succeeded by Cosmo George Gordon
