= List of British Army Regiments (2008) =

This is a list of British Regular Army regiments as constituted as a result of the British defence white paper Delivering Security in a Changing World in 2004 and "Delivering Security in a Changing World Future Capabilities" in 2005.

== Cavalry ==
=== Household Cavalry ===
==== Household Cavalry Regiment and Household Cavalry Mounted Regiment ====
- The Life Guards
- The Blues and Royals (Royal Horse Guards and 1st Dragoons)

=== Royal Armoured Corps ===
==== Heavy Cavalry ====
- 1st The Queen's Dragoon Guards
- The Royal Scots Dragoon Guards (Carabiniers and Greys)
- The Royal Dragoon Guards

==== Light Cavalry ====
- The Queen's Royal Hussars (The Queen's Own and Royal Irish)
- 9th/12th Royal Lancers (Prince of Wales's)
- The King's Royal Hussars
- The Light Dragoons
- The Queen's Royal Lancers

==== The Royal Tank Regiment ====
- 1st Royal Tank Regiment
- 2nd Royal Tank Regiment

== Infantry ==
Note: When a regiment is described as having n + n battalions, the first number is regular army battalions, and the second is Territorial Army battalions.

=== Foot Guards ===
- Grenadier Guards - 1 + 0 battalion
- Coldstream Guards - 1 + 0 battalion
- Scots Guards - 1 + 0 battalion
- Irish Guards - 1 + 0 battalion
- Welsh Guards - 1 + 0 battalion
- London Regiment - 0 + 1 battalion

=== Line Infantry ===
- Royal Regiment of Scotland - 5 + 2 battalions formed by an amalgamation of:
  - The Royal Scots (The Royal Regiment)
  - The King's Own Scottish Borderers
  - The Royal Highland Fusiliers (Princess Margaret's Own Glasgow and Ayrshire Regiment)
  - The Black Watch (Royal Highland Regiment)
  - The Highlanders (Seaforth, Gordons and Camerons)
  - The Argyll and Sutherland Highlanders (Princess Louise's)
- Princess of Wales's Royal Regiment (Queen's and Royal Hampshires) - 2 + 1 battalions
- Duke of Lancaster's Regiment (King's Lancashire and Border) - 3 + 1 battalions formed by an amalgamation of: (Note: The Duke of Lancaster's Regiment was initially formed with three regular battalions, before settling into its final complement of two)
  - King's Own Royal Border Regiment
  - King's Regiment
  - Queen's Lancashire Regiment
- Royal Regiment of Fusiliers - 2 + 1 battalions
- Royal Anglian Regiment - 2 + 1 battalions
- Yorkshire Regiment (14th/15th, 19th and 33rd/76th Foot) - 3 + 1 battalions formed by an amalgamation of:
  - Prince of Wales's Own Regiment of Yorkshire
  - The Green Howards (Alexandra, Princess of Wales's Own Yorkshire Regiment)
  - The Duke of Wellington's Regiment (West Riding)
- Mercian Regiment - 3 + 1 battalions formed by an amalgamation of:
  - 22nd (Cheshire) Regiment
  - Worcestershire and Sherwood Foresters Regiment (29th/45th Foot)
  - The Staffordshire Regiment (The Prince of Wales's)
- Royal Welsh - 2 + 1 battalions formed by an amalgamation of:
  - Royal Welch Fusiliers
  - Royal Regiment of Wales (24th/41st Foot)
- Royal Irish Regiment (27th (Inniskilling) 83rd and 87th and The Ulster Defence Regiment) - 1 + 1 battalion
- Parachute Regiment - 3 + 1 battalions (Note: 1st Battalion, The Parachute Regiment forms the major element of the Special Forces Support Group, and is therefore not grouped with the rest of the infantry)
- Royal Gurkha Rifles - 2 + 0 battalions
- The Rifles - 5 + 2 battalions formed by an amalgamation of:
  - Devonshire and Dorset Light Infantry
  - The Light Infantry
  - Royal Gloucestershire, Berkshire and Wiltshire Light Infantry
  - Royal Green Jackets

== Special Forces ==
- Special Air Service
- Special Reconnaissance Regiment
- Special Forces Support Group

== The Army Air Corps ==
- Army Air Corps

== Support Arms and Services ==
=== Support Arms ===
- Royal Regiment of Artillery
- Corps of Royal Engineers
- Royal Corps of Signals
- Intelligence Corps

=== Services ===
- Royal Army Chaplains Department
- Royal Logistic Corps
- Royal Army Medical Corps
- Corps of Royal Electrical and Mechanical Engineers
- Adjutant General's Corps
- Royal Army Veterinary Corps
- Small Arms School Corps
- Royal Army Dental Corps
- Army Physical Training Corps (Granted 'Royal' prefix in 2010)
- General Service Corps
- Queen Alexandra's Royal Army Nursing Corps
- Corps of Army Music
