= Royal Wessex Regiment =

The Royal Wessex Regiment was the name suggested for a regiment proposed by the initial discussions into the Future Army Structure brought up as part of Delivering Security in a Changing World. It was planned to be formed by the amalgamation of the Devonshire and Dorset Regiment and Royal Gloucestershire, Berkshire and Wiltshire Regiment.

== History ==
The Wessex Brigade had previously rejected the formation of a large regiment in the 1960s, although the territorial Wessex Regiment (Volunteers) had existed from 1967 to 1995. When the Brigade structure was ended in the late 60s, the Wessex Brigade reverted to single battalion regiments, becoming part of the Prince of Wales' Division. However, in 2004, it was announced that all remaining single battalion regiments would be amalgamated into large regiments.

The interim plan proposed by the Executive Committee of the Army Board (ECAB) for the Prince of Wales' Division was to create three Regiments, each with two regular and one territorial battalion:

- The Royal Welch Fusiliers and Royal Regiment of Wales (24th/41st Foot) would be amalgamated into a two battalion Welsh regiment
- The 22nd (Cheshire) Regiment, Worcestershire and Sherwood Foresters Regiment (29th/45th Foot) and the Staffordshire Regiment (The Prince of Wales's) would be amalgamated into a two battalion regiment
- The Devonshire and Dorset Regiment and the Royal Gloucestershire, Berkshire and Wiltshire Regiment would be amalgamated into a two battalion regiment.

On 16 December 2004, the Secretary of State for Defence announced that, as part of the final restructuring, the Royal Gloucestershire, Berkshire and Wiltshire Regiment would be deamalgamated into its constituent parts, with the former Gloucestershire Regiment element merging with the Devonshire and Dorset Regiment to become the new 1st Battalion, The Light Infantry, and the former Duke of Edinburgh's Royal Regiment (Berkshire and Wiltshire) amalgamating with the Princess of Wales's Royal Regiment (Queen's and Royal Hampshires). Approximately six months later, this decision was reversed, with the RGBW then to be amalgamated wholesale with the D&D as a single battalion of the new large regiment that eventually became The Rifles.
