= 7th Battalion, The Rifles =

7th Battalion, The Rifles (formerly the Royal Rifle Volunteers)
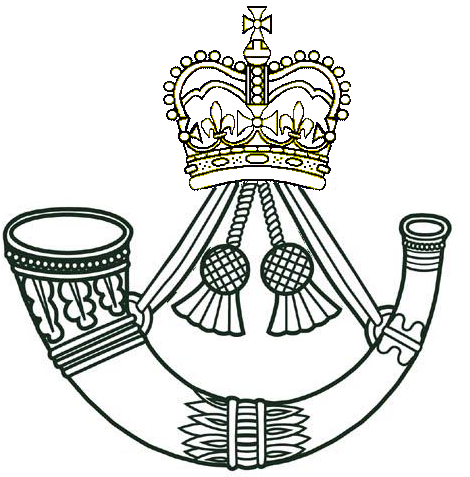
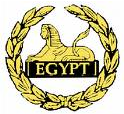
- Cap and Back badges of The Rifles
- Active: 1999–Present
- Country: United Kingdom
- Branch: British Army
- Type: Armoured Infantry
- Size: 320 personnel (2024)
- Part of: 20th Armoured Infantry Brigade
- Battalion HQ: Iverna Gardens drill hall, Kensington
- Nickname: 7 RIFLES
- Colours: Rifle Green
- Equipment: Warrior IFV
- Engagements: KFOR; SFOR; Operation Palliser; Operation Telic; Operation Banner; Operation Herrick; Operation Tosca
- Website: 7 RIFLES

Insignia
- Royal Rifle Volunteers TRF

- Rifles TRF

- Rifles Arm Badge: Croix de Guerre; From Devonshire and Dorset Light Infantry

The 7th Battalion, The Rifles (7 RIFLES) is an Army Reserve battalion of the British Army originally formed from elements of the Royal Rifle Volunteers, and Royal Green Jacket badged Sub-Units of The London Regiment following the Future Army Structure programme, and remains an integral part of the regiment.

== Royal Rifle Volunteers ==
=== Formation ===
In 1999, the Territorial Army (TA) was reorganised, in what became part of the Strategic Defence Review, with an emphasis on the reduction of the infantry and expansion of the armoured (yeomanry) and royal artillery (air defence elements). On 1 July 1999, the Royal Rifle Volunteers (RRV) was formed through the amalgamation of the following battalions: 6th/7th (Volunteer) Battalion, Princess of Wales's Royal Regiment (part), 2nd (Volunteer) Battalion, Royal Gloucestershire, Berkshire and Wiltshire Regiment (part), and 5th (Volunteer) Battalion, Royal Green Jackets. The new regiment becoming the TA infantry regiment for the South Central area.

The new regiment's structure on formation was as follows:

- Regimental Headquarters, at Brock Barracks, Reading
- A (Royal Green Jackets) Company, in Oxford – from amalgamation of HQ & A Coys, 5th (V) Bn, Royal Green Jackets
  - Anti-Tank Platoon, in High Wycombe (later moved to Oxford and replaced by a Rifle Platoon)
  - Waterloo Band and Bugles, at Slade Park Barracks, Headington – inherited from 5 RGJ
- (B) Royal Gloucestershire, Berkshire, and Wiltshire Company, at Brock Barracks, Reading – from HQ & C Coys, 2nd (V) Bn, Royal Gloucestershire, Berkshire, and Wiltshire Regiment
  - Rifle Platoon, in Swindon
- C (Princess of Wales's Royal Regiment) Company, in Portsmouth – from C Coy, 6th/7th (V) Bn, Princess of Wales's Royal Regiment
  - 9 (Princess Beatrice's Isle of Wight Rifles) Platoon, in Newport
- E (Royal Green Jackets) Company, in Milton Keynes – from E Coy, 5th (V) Bn, Royal Green Jackets

The new regiment was placed under command of the 145th (South) Brigade, which, in 2000, was redesignated as the 145th (Home Counties) Brigade. The regiment was, and would remain the only infantry unit in the brigade, sitting alongside its University Officer Training Corps counterparts.

=== Future Army Structure ===
On 1 April 2000, 9 (PBIWR) Platoon was redesignated as 9 (Isle of Wight) Platoon, losing its connection with Princess Beatrice's Isle of Wight Rifles.

In 2003, the Future Army Structure programme was announced, which would see the infantry of the army reorganised into new "Large Regiments". On 22 July 2005, the RGBW Company was redesignated as B (RGBW) Company and consolidated in Reading, and on 1 April 2006, the battalion was reorganised in preparation for its integration into the Rifles into the following:

- Battalion Headquarters, at Brock Barracks, Reading
- Headquarters Company, at Brock Barracks, Reading – from amalgamation of HQ & B Coy
  - Waterloo Band and Bugles, at Slade Park Barracks, Headington
- A (Royal Green Jackets) Company, at Edward Brooks Barracks, Abingdon-on-Thames
  - Platoon in High Wycombe/Marlow
- E (Royal Green Jackets) Company, at John Howard Barracks, Blakelands
- F (Royal Green Jackets) Company, at Davies Street drill hall, Mayfair, London (transferred from the London Regiment)
- G (Royal Green Jackets) Company, in West Ham, London (from the London Regiment)

In addition to the above structure changes, C (PWRR) Coy was transferred to the 3rd (Volunteer) Battalion, Princess of Wales's Royal Regiment.

=== Royal Rifle Volunteers - Operational deployments to the Balkans, Afghanistan, and Iraq ===
From the late 1990s, during the relatively recent campaigns in the Balkans, Afghanistan, and Iraq, Reserve Forces accounted for some 10 per cent of overall UK force levels. Many of the RRV reservists who deployed did so as individual reinforcements, such as those reservists who deployed to the Balkans, but some also deployed in formed composite sub-units, as platoons or companies.

During the War in Afghanistan (2001-2021), the RRV was the third Reserve regiment to mobilise some fifty-four soldiers on Operation FINGAL. The two RRV platoons deployed to Camp Souter for a four-month tour from February to May 2003. As part of the International Security Assistance Force (ISAF), their role was to form part of the Kabul Patrols Company, in concert with A Company, 2nd Battalion, The Royal Anglian Regiment. In May, the RRV was relieved in place by a sub-unit from 3rd Battalion, The Princess of Wales's Royal Regiment (3 PWRR), which deployed for a six-month Operation FINGAL tour.

During the Iraq War (2003-2011), individual RRV reservists deployed on Operation TELIC 2. Subsequently, from October 2003 to April 2004, during Operation TELIC 3, the RRV provided one of two platoons for ‘Eden Company’; the other platoon was furnished by The East of England Regiment. Their role was Force Protection Company for HQ 20 Armoured Brigade, at Basra Palace. In April 2004, the RRV platoon returned to the United Kingdom and was demobilised shortly thereafter.

From May to November 2005, during Operation TELIC 6 in Iraq, the RRV deployed ‘Roebuck Company’, comprising 110 reservists, which included a platoon from 3 PWRR. Its role was Force Protection Company for HQ Multi-National Division (South-East) in Basra, located at the Coalition Operating Base, at Basra Airport. Roebuck Company was initially under Command of the Rear Operations Battle Group, 2nd Battalion, The Princess of Wales's Royal Regiment, and later under Force Protection Wing, Basra Air Station. On 26 November 2005, the company was relieved and returned to the UK, initially returning to Bodney Camp, Norfolk, until demobilisation.

By 2005 all UK operations in Afghanistan were consolidated under the single name Operation HERRICK. On 26 January 2006, Secretary of State for Defence John Reid announced members of the regiment would deploy alongside HQ Allied Rapid Reaction Corps to provide force protection at, what would later become, Camp Bastion. Thirty Soldiers of the regiment then formed Salamanca Platoon, which deployed with Task Force Helmand from April to September 2006.

Individual RRV reservists also served in Northern Ireland (Operation Banner), Bosnia and Herzegovina (SFOR), Autonomous Province of Kosovo and Metohija (KFOR), and Sierra Leone (Operation Palliser).

== 7th Battalion, The Rifles ==
=== Formation ===
On 1 February 2007, the RRV regimental headquarters was reduced to a battalion headquarters and renamed as the 7th Battalion, The Rifles (7 RIFLES). Following the regiment's integration into The Rifles, the Waterloo Band became the Waterloo Band of the Rifles. After its redesignation, the regiment remained under 145th Bde and remained as a light infantry battalion.

=== Army 2020 ===
In 2013, a restructuring the Army was announced, Army 2020, which would help the army become more deployable and quicker-reacting. Part of this reform was the redesignation of Support Command, with its subordinate divisions disbanding and most brigades being disbanded. 145th Bde merged with 11th Light Brigade in Lisburn, and 2nd (South East) Brigade at Folkestone to form the 11th Infantry Brigade and Headquarters South East at Aldershot Garrison forming the new regional HQ. Under this reform, the 7 RIFLES joined 38th (Irish) Brigade and was paired with 2 RIFLES based in Lisburn, Northern Ireland.

Under this reorganisation, the battalion itself was reorganised with the following changes occurring: High Wycombe Platoon, A Coy was disbanded, and the company consolidated in Abingdon-on-Thames. E Coy was converted and redesignated as No. 678 (The Rifles) Squadron, Army Air Corps with Marlow Platoon becoming Marlow Troop, 871 Postal & Courier Squadron RLC. F & G Companies remained unchanged. In addition, all company subtitles were removed.

=== Army 2020 Refine ===
In 2015, a further supplement was published to the previous Army 2020 plan, entitled "Army 2020", which saw the battalion expand, change role, and move formation. As part of this refine, the battalion was moved under the 20th Armoured Infantry Brigade, equipped with Warrior Infantry Fighting Vehicles (thereby becoming 'Armoured Infantry'), de-linked with 2 RIFLES from the formation of 8 RIFLES in 2018, and paired with 5 RIFLES.

Under the reforms, A Coy formed two new platoons in Aylesbury and High Wycombe, a new B Coy was formed in Swindon and Bulford, a new C Company was formed in Reading (taking responsibility for the Assault Pioneer Platoon from HQ Coy) and F Company was moved to the London Regiment, G Company added outstations in Mile End and Kensington, HQ Coy remained in Reading.

The battalion's new structure as of April 2021 is as follows:

- Battalion Headquarters, at Iverna Gardens drill hall, Kensington
- Headquarters Company, at Brock Barracks, Reading
  - Waterloo Band and Bugles of the Rifles, at Edward Brooks Barracks, Abingdon-on-Thames
- A Company, at Edward Brooks Barracks, Abingdon-on-Thames
  - 1 Platoon, at Viney House, Aylesbury
  - 2 Platoon, at Youens House, High Wycombe
- B Company, in Swindon
  - 6 (Bulford) Platoon, at Ward Barracks, Bulford Camp
- C Company, at Brock Barracks, Reading
- G Company, in West Ham, London
  - Platoon, in Mile End, London
  - Platoon, in Kensington, London, collocated with BHQ.

=== Future Soldier ===
In 2021, a further British Army Wide restructure was announced, "Future Soldier".

- With this C Coy was subsumed back into HQ Coy, at Brock Barracks in Reading, Sub-unit renamed R(HQ) Coy. This merger was enacted on 9 May 2023.
- R(HQ) Coy renamed as HQ Coy in July 2023.

2023 B Coy's Bulford Pl and G Coy's Kensington Pl are removed from the ORBAT.

2025 HQ Coy's "Black economy" Rifle Pl was formally subsumed into B Coy, and named 6 Pl, replacing the Pl that had been based at Bulford.

== Waterloo Band and Bugles ==
Until 2009, the band was based at Slade Park Barracks, Oxford, but moved to Edward Brooks Barracks in Abingdon-on-Thames under Headquarters Company.

== Colonels ==
Royal Colonel

- February 2007–Present: HRH The Duchess of Gloucester

Honorary Colonels

From 1999, Honorary Colonels of the companies are also 'Deputy Honorary Colonels' of the regiment.

- 1 July 1999 – 1 September 2003: Lieutenant General Sir Hew Pike, HCB DSO MBE
- 1 September 2003–: Major General David Julian Richards, CBE DSO

Deputy Honorary Colonels

- (1) 1 July 1999–????: Brigadier J. N. B. Mogg
- (2) 1 July 1999 – 1 September 2006: Colonel R. P. Bateman, TD
- (2) 1 September 2006–: xxxx
- (3) 1 July 1999–????: Brigadier R. M. Koe
- (4) 1 July 1999 – 1 January 2003: Colonel T. B. Dutton, OBE
- (4) 1 January 2003–????: Colonel S. J. Oxlade, MBE
