= Davies Street drill hall =

- Mayfair, London
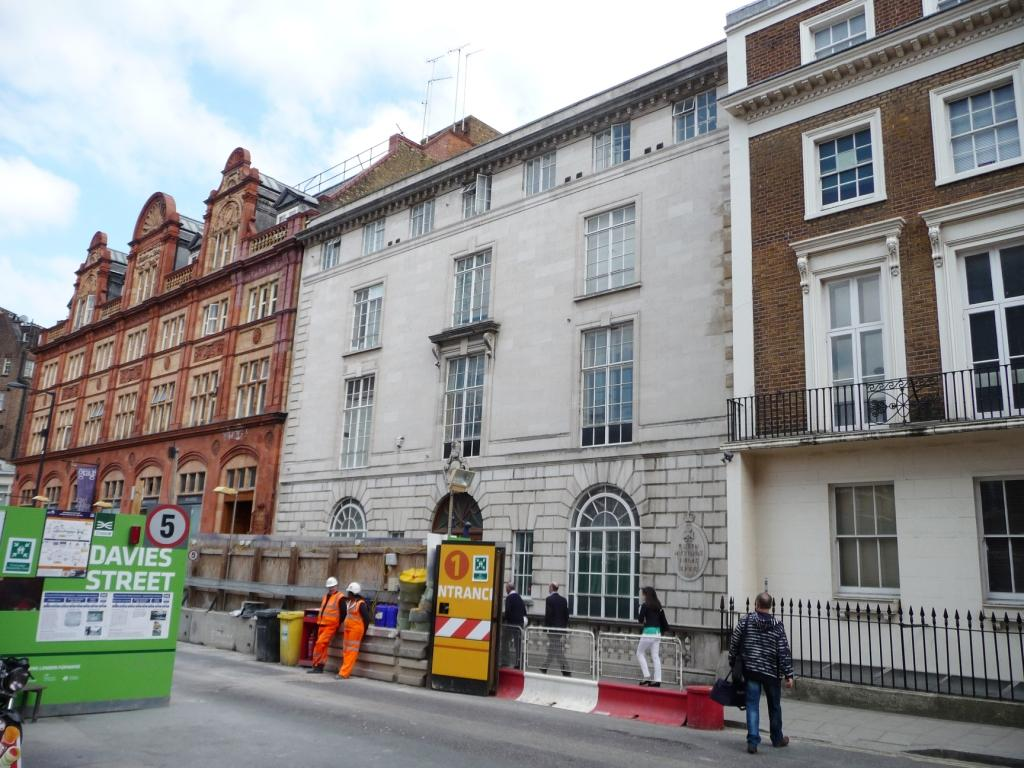
- Davies Street drill hall

Site information
- Type: Drill Hall

Location
- Location within London
- Coordinates: 51.51328°N 0.14836°W

Site history
- Built: 1890
- Built for: War Office
- In use: 1890-Present

Garrison information
- Occupants: F Company 7th Battalion The Rifles

The Davies Street drill hall is a former military installation in Davies Street, London.

== History ==
The original drill hall on the site, which was designed by Charles Herbert Shoppee as the headquarters of the 1st Middlesex (Victoria and St George's) Volunteer Rifle Corps, was built by E. Lawrance and Sons and completed in December 1890. It was opened by the Duchess of Westminster. That unit amalgamated with the 19th Middlesex (St. Giles's and St. George's, Bloomsbury) Volunteer Rifle Corps and to form the 9th (County of London) Battalion, London Regiment (Queen Victoria's) in 1908. The battalion was mobilised at the drill hall in August 1914 before being deployed to the Western Front.

When the London Regiment was broken up and the battalions reallocated to other units in August 1937, the hall became the home of the Queen Victoria's Rifles, The King's Royal Rifle Corps.

On 30 November 1940, during the Second World War, the building was badly damaged by a bomb. It was agreed to rebuild the hall to a design by Trenwith Wills and it was rebuilt by James Miller and Partners between 1950 and 1952. In 1952, following another re-organisation, the unit based at the drill hall was renamed the 7th Battalion The King's Royal Rifle Corps (Queen Victoria's Rifles). That unit evolved to become the 4th (Volunteer) Battalion, Royal Green Jackets in 1967; F (Royal Green Jackets) Company the London Regiment in 1999; F Company, Royal Rifle Volunteers in 2006; and F Company, 7th Battalion, The Rifles the following year.

F Company transferred to the London Regiment and moved to the Hammersmith Road drill hall in 2017.
