= Rifle Volunteers =

The Rifle Volunteers 6th Battalion, The Rifles
- Active: 1999 – present
- Allegiance: United Kingdom
- Branch: British Army
- Type: Line Infantry
- Role: Light Role Infantry — Army Reserve
- Size: 335 personnel (2024)

Commanders
- Current commander: Lt. Col Olly Bevan

The Rifle Volunteers is a regiment of the British Territorial Army. In 2007, it was re-designated as 6th Battalion, The Rifles.

== History ==
The Rifle Volunteers were formed in 1999 by the amalgamation of the 6th (Volunteer) Battalion, The Light Infantry, 4th (Volunteer) Battalion, Devonshire and Dorset Regiment and elements of the 2nd (Volunteer) Battalion, Royal Gloucestershire, Berkshire and Wiltshire Regiment in consequence of the reforms implemented due to the Strategic Defence Review. The HQ was in Exeter, and the battalion comprised five rifle companies and a headquarters company, as follows:

- HQ Company, at Wyvern Barracks, Exeter
- A (The Royal Gloucestershire, Berkshire and Wiltshire Regiment) Company, at Gloucester, Bristol, and Cinderford
  (from A and B Companies, 2nd Battalion, Royal Gloucestershire, Berkshire and Wiltshire Regiment)
- B (Somerset Light Infantry) Company, at Taunton, Yeovil, and Bath
  (from HQ and B Companies, 6th Battalion, The Light Infantry)
- C (Devonshire and Dorset Regiment) Company, at Dorchester and Poole
  (from C and D Companies, 4th Battalion, Devonshire and Dorset Regiment)
- D (Cornwall Light Infantry) Company, at Truro, Bodmin, and Camborne
  (from C and D Companies, 6th Battalion, The Light Infantry)
- E (Devonshire and Dorset Regiment) Company, at Plymouth and Exeter
  (from HQ and A Companies, 4th Battalion, Devonshire and Dorset Regiment)

The Volunteer Band of the 4th Battalion, The Devonshire and Dorset Regiment formed the band of the Rifle Volunteers. The battalion regularly entered the Nordic & Biathlon Championships known as "Exercise Spartan Hike", held in Serre Chevalier, France each year. They were Territorial Army and 5th Division Champions for three years running between 2003 and 2005.

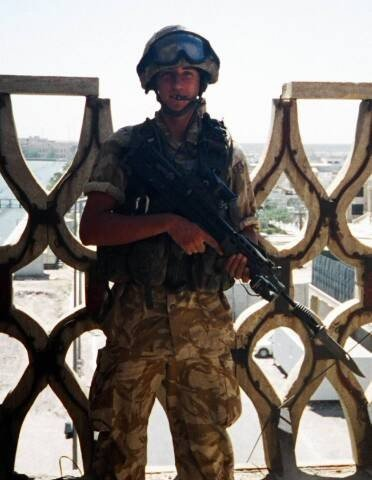
A soldier from the Rifle Volunteers in Iraq, 2004.

In 1999 a number of individuals were mobilised from The Rifle Volunteers to join 2nd Battalion The Royal Green Jackets on their Kosovo tour returning in early 2000.

The first major deployment from The Rifle Volunteers was in November 2003, when 55 soldiers were deployed to Kabul, Afghanistan, where they were attached to C 'Tavolato' Company, 2nd Battalion, The Royal Gurkha Rifles. On 28 January 2004, Private Jonathan Kitulagoda was killed by a suicide bomber whilst on a routine patrol.

In April 2004 a composite company of the regiment (Salamanca Company) was dispatched to Basra, Iraq. The company was attached to the 1st Battalion Cheshire Regiment, as part of 1 Mechanised Brigade, within the Multi-National Division (South East). Salamanca Company distinguished itself; Sergeant Peter 'Stooley' Poole-Reeves was awarded a Mention in Dispatches for his actions during a contact in which he was shot in the chest plate of his body armour. Additionally, Sergeant Kevin Pinnell and Private Matthew Gavin were awarded Joint Commander's Commendations. The company returned home at the end of October. The battalion was part of 43 (Wessex) Brigade.

=== Structure before re-designation ===
Shortly before re-designation as a battalion of the Rifles, the regiment's structure underwent a reform in order to reflect its post amalgamation structure, and ease the process:

- HQ (Devonshire and Dorset) Company, at Wyvern Barracks, Exeter
  (from E (Devonshire and Dorset Regiment) Company)
- A (Gloucestershire) Company, at Gloucester and Bristol
- B Company, at Taunton and Exeter
- C (Devonshire and Dorset) Company, at Dorchester and Poole
- D Company, at Bodmin and Plymouth
  (from Plymouth Platoon of E (Devonshire and Dorset Regiment) Company)

== 6th Battalion, The Rifles ==
On 24 November 2005, it was announced by the Ministry of Defence that the battalion would be re-designated as a territorial battalion of a new large regiment to be called The Rifles. To that effect, on 1 February 2007, the regiment became 6th Battalion, The Rifles. The battalion now serves as the reserve infantry battalion for Cornwall, Devon, Dorset, Somerset, Gloucestershire, and Hereford, with sub-units spread right across its recruiting area.

=== Current Structure ===
The battalion's current structure is as follows:

- HQ Company, at Wyvern Barracks, Exeter
  - Detachment, at Paignton
  - Detachment, at Barnstaple
- A Company, at Gloucester
  - 1 Platoon, at Gloucester
  - 2 Platoon, at Suvla Barracks, Hereford
  - 3 Platoon, at HMS Flying Fox, Bristol
- C Company, at Dorchester
  - 6 Platoon, at Poole
- D Company, at Truro
  - 8 Platoon, at Plymouth
