= Wessex Regiment =

Wessex Volunteers Wessex Regiment
- Active: 1967–1995
- Allegiance: United Kingdom
- Branch: British Army
- Role: Line Infantry
- Size: Two battalions

The Wessex Regiment was a Territorial Army infantry regiment of the British Army, in existence from 1967 to 1995. Initially consisting of a singular battalion, the regiment was later expanded to also have a second.

== Formation ==
The regiment was formed as the Wessex Volunteers on 1 April 1967 as successors to the former Territorial Army infantry battalions of the regiments of the Wessex Brigade, that had been reduced to cadre following the 1966 Defence White Paper and the subsequent formation of the TAVR. Its initial structure was as follows:

- HQ Company (Devon), at Exeter
  (from 4th Battalion, Devonshire Regiment)
- A Company (Gloucester), at Gloucester
  (from 5th Battalion, Gloucestershire Regiment)
- B Company (Hampshire), at Winchester and Basingstoke
  (from 4th/5th Battalion, Royal Hampshire Regiment)
- C Company (Dorset), at Dorchester and Poole
  (from 4th Battalion, Dorset Regiment)
- D Company (Berkshire), at Reading
  (from 4th/6th Battalion, Royal Berkshire Regiment)

== 1st Battalion ==
In 1971, the battalion underwent a re-organisation, and was re-designated as the 1st Battalion, Wessex Volunteers upon formation of the 2nd Battalion, before renaming as the 1st Battalion, Wessex Regiment (Rifle Volunteers) the next year; multiple detached platoons were formed for the rifle companies, and the company subtitles were omitted. Then in 1975, the battalion was re-organised once more, including the two battalions exchanging their respective D Companies. After these changes, the structure was as follows:

- HQ Company, at Le Marchant Barracks, Devizes
- A Company, at Gloucester Bristol and Forest of Dean
- B Company, at Winchester
- C Company, at Dorchester and Weymouth
- D (Queen's Own Dorset Yeomanry) Company, at Poole and Bournemouth
  (from D Company, 2nd Battalion and a platoon of C Company, 1st Battalion)
- E Company, at Exeter, Plymouth and Barnstaple

In 1986 and 1987, The Wessex Regiment was affiliated with both the Gloucestershire Regiment and Devonshire and Dorset Regiment in the regular army. It was the only reserve regiment in the South West with an active role as part of 1 Brigade (UKMF) NATO.

The Devonshire and Dorset Regiment was in the process of raising their own territorial infantry battalion, and as a result, the regiment lost the previously Devon and Dorset affiliated companies to form the new battalion in 1986. Namely: E Company to the new battalion as both HQ and A Companies, and B and C Companies retaining their lettering; the former was replaced by a rifle company raised in 1985 at Swindon, around the GPMG(SF) platoon from D Coy, 2nd Battalion.

Then, starting in 1992, in line with the British Army's reductions at the end of the Cold War, the battalion was reduced to a three rifle company establishment, losing D Company to the Devon and Dorsets, and both B and C companies to the 2nd Battalion. After this the structure consisted of:

- HQ Company, at Le Marchant Barracks, Devizes. Mortar Platoon at Andover; Anti-Tank Platoon at Stroud; Reconnaissance Platoon at Cheltenham; and Pioneer Platoon at Cinderford
- A Company 1 Plt, at Gloucester
- A Company 2 Plt & 3 Plt, at Bristol
  (from the Bristol platoons of A Company, and 245 Ambulance Squadron, 155 Transport Regiment)
- A Company Recce Plt, at Forest of Dean
- C Company, at Cheltenham and Tewkesbury

In 1995, the battalion amalgamated with the 2nd Battalion, to form 2nd (Volunteer) Battalion, Royal Gloucestershire, Berkshire and Wiltshire Regiment.

== 2nd Battalion ==
The 2nd Battalion, Wessex Volunteers was formed on 1 April 1971 from cadres of units that had been reduced in the formation of the TAVR, before being re-designated as the 2nd Battalion, Wessex Regiment (Volunteers) a year later in 1972. Its initial structure was as follows:

- HQ Company, at Brock Barracks, Reading
- B(Royal Buckinghamshire Yeomanry) Company, at Bletchley
  (from the Buckinghamshire Regiment, Royal Artillery)
- A (Duke of Connaught's) Company, at Portsmouth
  (from the Hampshire and Isle of Wight Territorials)
- C (Royal Berkshire) Company, at Maidenhead, Slough, and Newbury
  (from the Royal Berkshire Territorials)
- D (Queen's Own Dorset Yeomanry) Company, at Poole, Bournemouth, and Weymouth
  (from the Dorset Territorials)

At the height of the Cold War, the British Army decided to raise a home defence force, namely the Home Service Force. This saw the majority of territorial infantry battalions across the United Kingdom raise a HSF company, with platoons distributed across the battalion company locations. In light of this, the battalion raised E (HSF) Company in Reading, Maidenhead, Winchester, and Portsmouth. The battalion then underwent a re-organisation in 1986, and again in 1992, when the Home Service Force Company disbanded along with the rest of the force. In line with the territorial reductions at the end of the Cold War, the battalion was reduced to a three rifle company establishment.

In 1995, the battalion amalgamated with the 1st Battalion, to form 2nd (Volunteer) Battalion, Royal Gloucestershire, Berkshire and Wiltshire Regiment; less C Company, which transferred to the Royal Yeomanry as D (Berkshire Yeomanry) Squadron.

== Honorary Colonels ==
The Honorary Colonel throughout the regiment's existence were as follows:

1st Battalion

- 1967–1970: Bt. Colonel Sir Joseph W. Weld, OBE, TD, JP
- 1970–1975: Colonel William Q. Roberts, CBE, DSO, MVO, TD, DL
- 1975–1981: Major-General Glyn C.A. Gilbert, CB, MC
- 1981–?: Major-General Michael J.H. Walsh, CB, DSO
- ?–1995: Colonel M.S. Lee-Browne, CBE, TD, DL

2nd Battalion

- 1971–1973: Captain William Harris, 6th Earl of Malmesbury, TD, DL
- 1974–1980: Brigadier Valerian Wellesley, 8th Duke of Wellington, KG, LVO, OBE, MC
- 1980–1983: Brigadier John B. Oldfield, OBE, DL
- 1983–1985: Bt. Colonel The Hon. Gordon W.N. Palmer, OBE, TD, JP
- 1985–1990: Lieutenant-Colonel Sir James Scott, Bt.
- 1990–1995: General Sir John H. Learmont, KCB, CBE

=== Deputy Honorary Colonels ===
For a time, the individual companies each maintained Deputy Honorary Colonels in succession to their former units.

2nd Battalion

- A Company: Lieutenant-Colonel Lawrence J. Verney, TD, DL
- B Company: Admiral of the Fleet The Rt. Hon. Louis Mountbatten, 1st Earl Mountbatten of Burma, KG, PC, GCB, OM, GCSI, GCIE, GCVO, DSO,
- C Company: Major The Hon. David J. Smith, CBE, JP
- D Company: Bt. Colonel Sir Joseph W. Weld, OBE, TD, JP
