= Band and Bugles of The Rifles =

The Band & Bugles of the Rifles
- Active: 1 February 2007 to Present
- Country: United Kingdom
- Branch: British Army
- Type: Military band
- Role: Public duties
- Size: 48
- Part of: Royal Corps of Army Music
- Headquarters: RHQ—Winchester
- March: Quick: Mechanised Infantry; Double Past: Keel Row/Road to the Isles; Slow: Old Salamanca

Commanders
- Commanding Officer and Director of Music: Major Séan O’Neill
- Bandmaster: Warrant Officer Class One Tom Wood BMus(Hons) LRSM MCMI

The Band and Bugles of the Rifles is a military band serving as the regimental band for The Rifles, the sole rifle regiment and the largest in the British Army. It is the senior most of three bands in the regiment and is the only one that is part of the regular army. Uniquely, it employs bugles at its front, a tradition that goes back to the conflicts of the 18th century. Major Séan O’Neill is currently serving as the Director of Music (DOM) of the band and bugles. It is part of the Royal Corps of Army Music.

== Origins of rifle bands ==
The Band and Bugles uphold traditions that date back to as far as 1665. In their early years, drums were abandoned by rifle regiments and were replaced with the silver bugle. The Rifles pioneered the use of the bugle as a way of communicating on the battlefields as well as giving orders. The use of bugles date back to the Napoleonic Wars as a result of the lessons learned during the American Revolutionary War.

== The Light Infantry ==
The Light Infantry maintained the other half of the lineage of the Band and Bugles. In April 1985, the band was reduced from six to four regular bands. The final two bands consisted of the Corunna Band and the Salamanca Band.

== RGJ Bands ==
=== Battalion Bands ===
When cuts were made to regimental bands in 1984, the Royal Green Jackets decided to have two medium-sized bands rather than three small ones.

==== 1st Battalion ====
The 1st Battalion band dates its lineage from the Oxfordshire and Buckinghamshire Light Infantry Band and Bugles. The regiment is noted as having a "Band of Music" as early as 1768. An ensemble which was then part of the 43rd (Monmouthshire) Regiment of Foot grew to 11 members by 1792. The Standing Orders of the 43rd Foot issued in 1795 make clear how the band was established. In 1958, the Regiment was redesignated the 1st Green Jackets, which was marked by a military parade in Cyprus with the band performing of the marches of all the constituent regiments. With its redesignation, it marked the first time that the Battalion and the band had been stationed at back home since it was sent to fight in the Second World War in 1939. The massed bands made their debut performance soon after at Wembley Stadium for an England-Italy football international, though unfortunately the wrong Italian national anthem was played, which must have caused some offence. Stationed in Berlin at the time of the regiment's amalgamation, the band continued its standard round of engagements such as the Queen's Birthday Parade in 1966 as well as foreign trips to locations throughout the world such as Hong Kong to Northern Ireland.

==== 2nd Battalion ====
The King's Royal Rifle Corps Band dates back to 1783. It served in every war that has occurred since then including both World Wars. In 1958, the KRRC was officially redesignated the 2nd Green Jackets, though this had little immediate effect on the Band. Ted Jeanes continued as Bandmaster until 1961 when he was succeeded by Stewart Swanwick, formerly a musician in the 3rd King's African Rifles. In May 1969, was succeeded as Bandmaster by Jack Boden, who built on the legacy of his predecessors. In the 70s, the band served in Germany, all while alternating with the UK. Historical highlights include the Wembley Pageants of 1971 and 1973 and public duties at Buckingham Palace in 1972. In 1975, the Battalion was moved to Cyprus, where the Band played during Silver Jubilee Parade in 1977.

=== 1985-1994 ===
Between the disbandment of the battalion bands of the Royal Green Jackets in 1985 and the creation of the Band of the Light Division in 1994, the Royal Green Jackets had two regimental bands: the Normandy Band and the Peninsula Band.

==== Normandy Band of the RGJ ====
Bandmaster David Little, formerly a member of the 1st Green Jackets, was to remain for only just over a year before retiring, after which he was succeeded in December 1985 by trumpeter and percussionist Ian McElligott. Major events forte band took place in 1987 and 1988, during which the band took part in events, such as the Royal Bath and an inspection of Kneller Hall. 1989 saw the band being posted to Gibraltar, from which a tour was undertaken to Morocco to honour the 60th birthday of King Hassan II, performing a Sounding Retreat at Royal Palaces in Marrakesh and Fez. McElligott wa transferred to the Royal Military School of Music in 1992 and was replaced by Barry Wassell, who at the time of the formation of the Light Division, was moved to the newly formed Band of the Royal Lancers as Bandmaster as a training officer.

==== Peninsula Band of the RGJ ====
The Peninsula Band was first led by bandmaster Ian Harding on its formation, remaining on for 8 years. In 1988, it visited Canada as the official band for the exercise Medicine Man 3, as well as participate in the Calgary Stampede and conduct marching displays at the Olympic Plaza. After four years of being stationed in Germany as part of the British Army of the Rhine, which included tours of Sweden, Austria, Belgium, and France, the Band returned to its British barracks in 1989. They returned in 1989 for the 75th anniversary celebrations of Princess Patricia's Canadian Light Infantry, an affiliated Canadian Army regiment. Harding retired in 1992 and was succeeded by Ian Macpherson.

== Hyde Park bombings ==
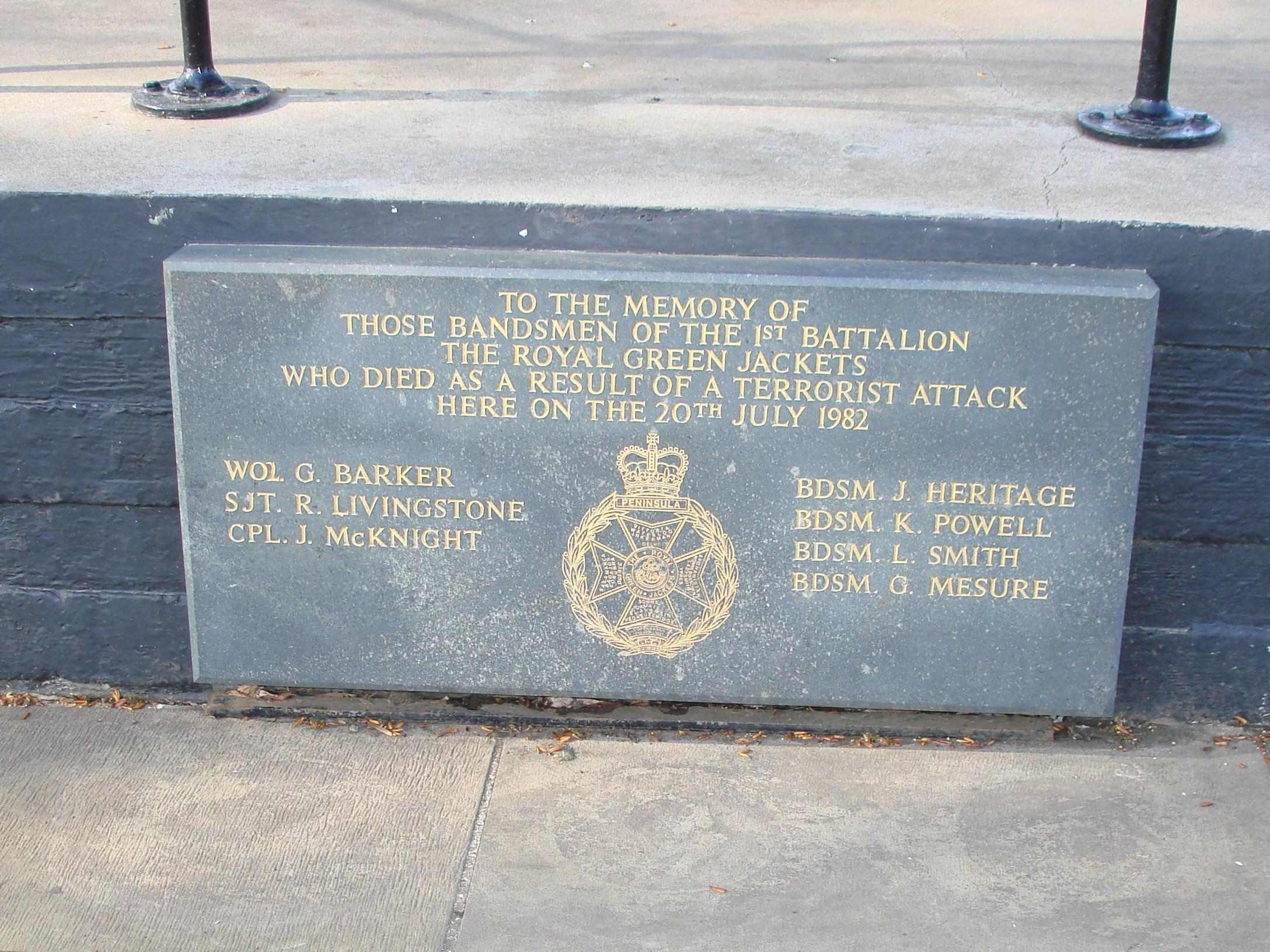
An oblong slate plaque with inscriptions in gold, set into a low wall.

Seven band members were killed on 20 July 1982 alongside four soldiers of the Blues and Royals by an improvised bomb by the Provisional Irish Republican Army (PIRA) at a public concert in Hyde Park and Regent's Park. The RGJ concert in the latter featured music from Oliver! to 120 people at the bandstand in Regents Park. The bomb had been hidden under the stand some time before and seemed to be designed to cause minimal harm to bystanders.

The seven fatalities from the RGJ Band included the following:

- WO2 Graham Barker, 1st Battalion The Royal Green Jackets
- Bandsman John Heritage, 1st Battalion The Royal Green Jackets
- Corporal Robert Livingstone, 1st Battalion The Royal Green Jackets
- Corporal Robert McKnight, 1st Battalion The Royal Green Jackets
- Bandsman George Mesure, 1st Battalion The Royal Green Jackets
- Bandsman Keith Powell, 1st Battalion The Royal Green Jackets
- Bandsman Laurence Smith, 1st Battalion The Royal Green Jackets

The band was regrouped five weeks later with just nine men under the direction of David Little. In 1983, a concert on a rebuilt bandstand was held by the band to commemorate the unveiling of a memorial plaque by Prime Minister Margaret Thatcher.

== Light Division ==
In August 1994, the Band and Bugles of the Light Division was formed from a merger of the four regimental bands of the Light Division. The Band and Bugles was one of the various artists featured on Over the Hills & Far Away: The Music of Sharpe, released in 1996 as a companion to the Sharpe television series. At the time of its existence, it was the only 49 piece Army band based outside London. It had recent overseas tours have included Jordan, Greece, Cyprus and much of continental Europe.

== Modern day ==
On 1 February 2007, the Light Division was reformed into The Rifles. The traditional names of the regiments that formed the regiment were not retained, which resulted in the band being renamed.

The band performs in the musicians also perform in many varied combinations such as:

- Marching Band
- Concert Band
- Woodwind Quintet
- Brass Quintet
- Fanfare Trumpet Teams
- Barbershop Quartet
- String Ensemble
- Dixieland Jazz Band
- Dance Band

The band provides support for many famous military and civilian events including Garden Parties at Buckingham Palace and the former Royal Tournament as well as making regular television and radio appearances. The section of the band that performs with bugles are known collectively as the Bugle Platoon, which is composed of 20 soldiers from the five regular battalions. Many bugler's complete an 18-week course at the Army School of Ceremonial in Catterick. In June 2016, the Band and Bugles was prohibited from marching in a Sounding Retreat Ceremony at the fields of Bodmin Town F.C. in Cornwall, citing concerns over the conditions of the landscape that might be messed up due to the marching. Lance Kennedy, the Mayor of Bodmin, described it as an "unfortunate decision". In October 2017, the band performed for pupils at the Haberdashers' Adams.

The Buglers' Association was initially created in 2013 by veteran buglers of The Light Infantry to give former buglers their own association. The Association buglers are now regularly engaged in performing at events across the country, the scale of which is growing as of the present. Today, these buglers perform in almost all occasions, including funerals, Remembrance Day ceremonies, parades and concerts with the Band of the Rifles and/or the reserve bands.

== Traditions ==
=== Marching pace ===
The Buglers are selected from the regular battalions and are trained to play the bugle and a fast march of 140 paces per minute. In doing this, they march in a half-step. As a result of this fact, the band sounds a bugle call followed by a quick drum beat to signal a quick march, which breaks from other military bands that use a regular drum beat for this purpose. The band never performs slow marches except during occasions that require it (i.e. Trooping of the Colour, Presentation of Colours, Changing of the King's Guard).

=== Sounding Retreat ===
The Sounding Retreat is form of the Beating Retreat ceremony of the Household Division that is performed by the Band and Bugles as well as all other rifle bands. The National ceremony (which represents Retreat in the British Army) has been done on 31 May and 1 June on Horse Guards Parade, with the recent one being held in 2022. Besides the Bugle Band of the Rifles, the Band of the Brigade of Gurkhas also takes part in the ceremony, alongside other bugle bands and the Bugler's Association. In 2016, the Royal Hamilton Light Infantry Band from Canada took part in the ceremony. Prior to 2016, it had been conducted in London on very few occasions, with previous years including 1993, 1987 and 1979.

=== Bugle Major ===
The ceremonial leader of the band is known as the Bugle Major, who stands as a version of the Drum major. Unlike other military drum majors, the bugle major utilizes a shorter mace that is carried at the side of the torso. When preparing to march, the commander of the guard call out: "Bugle Major!", to which the actual Bugle Major responds with "Sir!" and begins conducting the bugle calls for a quick march. In the case of marching at the double, the guard commander which yell: "Sound the Double!"

=== Colonel Commandant’s Annual Inspection ===
The Colonel Commandant’s Annual Inspection is held annually at the Army Training Regiment Winchester. It features a marching display as well as a Bugle Competition.

== Commonly played and adapted music ==
Regimental marches:

- Mechanised Infantry (official quick march)
- Keel Row/Road to the Isles (Double Past)
- Old Salamanca (Slow)
- Regimental Call: 1st Bar of Light Division Assembly
- Light Infantry (former)
- Huntsman's Chorus/Italian Song (former)
- March Off of the Rifles

Historical marches:

- Prince Albert
- Palace Guard
- One and All
- The 46th
- Trelawney
- With Jockey to the Fair
- The Minden March
- On Ilkley Moor
- The Yorkshire Girl
- The Farmer's Boy
- La Ligne
- Land of My Fathers
- The Lincolnshire Poacher
- Le Régiment de Sambre et Meuse
- The Light Barque
- The Old 68th
- Garryowen
- Silver Bugles
- Old Towler
- The Daughter of the Regiment
- The 53rd
- Raglan
- I'm 95
- Light Division
- Secunderabad
- Blaydon Races

Other Bugle Calls:

- The 53rd Salute
- KSLI Officers Mess Calls
- Cavalry Brigade Salute
- Light Cavalry
- The Lucknow Call

== Influence ==
- Its traditions and styles are mirrored in the reserve bands of the Rifles: Salamanca Band and the Waterloo Band.
- The bands of the Royal Marines Band Service are the only military bands in the British Armed Forces where bugles are part of the unit's specific traditions. They are usually maintained in the front rank of corps of drums, where the drummers also double as buglers.
- It has been the influence for several former drum and bugle corps as well as many rifle bands in service with the Canadian Armed Forces (CAF).
- Front rank bugle arrangements are also used in Sri Lankan military bands.
- Most Indian military bands use the same marching pace as the Band and Bugles. Bugles are also used in many rifle bands, who often use similar uniforms as well. An example of this influence is the Band of the Assam Rifles.
- The Neuss-based Quirinus Band and Bugle Corps, formed in 2011, is affiliated to the Band and Bugles and its marching pace mirrors that used by the band. Under its current Bandmaster, Peter Hosking, a veteran former musician of the bands of the Royal Green Jackets and affiliated as well to the Royal Green Jackets Association, it wears the uniforms used by the RGJ, which served in West Germany during the Cold War, and its predecessor units, with the red plume over the dark green shako. Being the first German military marching band of its kind, it also honors the German first generation riflemen of the final decades of the 18th and the first decades of the 19th century who served with their English, Scottish and Irish servicemen in the ranks of both the King's Royal Rifle Corps and the Rifle Brigade (The Prince Consort's Own).
- The Silver Bugles Band of the Somerset Army Cadets of the Army Cadet Force is modeled after the Band and Bugles of The Rifles.

== See also ==
- Queen's Own Rifles of Canada Band & Bugles
- Band of the Brigade of Gurkhas
- La Musique des Voltigeurs de Québec
- Indian military bands
- Sri Lankan military bands
