= Delivering Security in a Changing World =

2003 British white paper

The 2003 Defence White Paper, titled Delivering Security in a Changing World, set out the future structure of the British military, and was preceded by the 1998 Strategic Defence Review (SDR) and the 2002 SDR New Chapter, which responded to the immediate challenges to security in the aftermath of the September 11 attacks in 2001. Published under the then Secretary of State for Defence, Geoff Hoon, the report effectively introduced a series of cutbacks to core equipment and manpower and the scaling back of a series of future capital procurement projects. This was justified due to the implementation of a policy termed Network Enabled Capability. The review also outlined a major restructuring and consolidation of British Army Infantry regiments.

== Key points ==
The White Paper, scaling back to an extent from the previous Strategic Defence Review, outlined the following posture for the UK armed forces:

- The ability to support three simultaneous small (e.g. Operation Palliser in Sierra Leone) to medium scale (e.g. Operation Veritas in Afghanistan) operations, where at least one is an enduring peace-keeping mission (e.g. Kosovo). These forces must be capable of acting as lead nation in any coalition operations.
- The ability, at longer notice, to deploy forces in a large scale operation (e.g. Operation Telic in Iraq or Operation Herrick in Afghanistan) while running a concurrent small scale operation.

Most of the reforms listed below were announced as part of the Delivering Security in a Changing World: Future Capabilities review, published on 21 July 2004.

British Army

- Manpower reduced by 1,000.
- Restructuring will cut 4 infantry battalions otherwise tasked to Northern Ireland, and the manpower redistributed elsewhere.
- Army High Velocity Missile fire units to be halved, which would lead to the re-role of 2 TA Royal Artillery regiments; 100th (Yeomanry) Regiment Royal Artillery, re-equipped with L118 light guns and 104th Regiment Royal Artillery, re-equipped with L118 light guns. In addition, 22nd Regiment Royal Artillery was disbanded.
- The re-role of a Challenger 2 regiment into an armoured reconnaissance regiment, Queen's Royal Lancers, and several AS-90 batteries to a light gun regiment, 40th Regiment Royal Artillery, into what would become 19 Light Brigade (see Future Army Structure).
- Withdrawal of 7 Challenger 2 squadrons and 6 AS-90 self-propelled gun batteries (approx. 84 tanks and 48 AS90s). → 4 of these from the Queen's Royal Lancers, three others from Royal Wessex Yeomanry (4 tank replacement squadrons dissolved to just 1 replacement squadron; A (Dorset Yeomanry) Armour Replacement Squadron)
- Infantry battalions to be incorporated into new, large, multi-battalion regiments.
- Creation of 3 light armoured squadrons that will support development of the next generation of armoured vehicles, the Future Rapid Effect System (FRES).

Royal Air Force

- Manpower reduced by 7,000.
- Early withdrawal of the 41-strong SEPECAT Jaguar force by 2007 and closure of Jaguar's operating base, RAF Coltishall, Norfolk.
- Current Nimrod MR2 maritime patrol aircraft fleet to be reduced from 21 to 16.
- Reduction in the purchase of re-manufactured Nimrod MRA.4s from 18 to 16 (eventually 9 and then later cancelled) aircraft.
- Reduction in the Tornado F3 force by one squadron (16 aircraft) in preparation for replacement with Typhoon.
- Reduction of 6 Puma helicopters of No. 230 Squadron RAF based in Northern Ireland.
- Reduction in Rapier missile launchers from 48 to 24, coupled with the transfer of the launchers to the Royal Artillery, and the disbandment of four RAF Regiment squadrons that operated Rapier.
- Additional procurement numbers of Hawk 128 training aircraft above an initial batch of 20 to be decided upon in 2005.
- Typhoon purchase confirmed, Tranche 2 contract delayed until December 2004 when cost/capability issues were resolved.
- Purchase of 4 Boeing C-17s operated by the RAF at the end of their lease period including one additional aircraft for a total fleet of 5.

Royal Navy

- Manpower reduced by 1,500.
- Reduced purchase of Type 45 destroyers from 12 to 8 (eventually 6) vessels.
- Reduced force of Type 23 frigates from 16 to 13 vessels by March 2006.
- Reduced force of nuclear attack submarine fleet (SSNs) from 12 to 8 boats by December 2008.
- Reduced force of mine countermeasure vessels from 19 to 16 by April 2005.
- Northern Ireland patrol fleet of 3 reconfigured Hunt-class mine hunters to be decommissioned by April 2007.
- Early retirement of the 3 oldest Type 42 destroyers.
- Royal Navy Future Carrier (CVF) purchase confirmed.
- A summary of warships to be paid off, as planned or early, without replacement as detailed in the review:
  - HMS Cardiff, Type 42 destroyer.
  - HMS Newcastle, Type 42 destroyer.
  - HMS Glasgow, Type 42 destroyer.
  - HMS Norfolk, Type 23 frigate.
  - HMS Marlborough, Type 23 frigate.
  - HMS Grafton, Type 23 frigate.
  - HMS Superb, Swiftsure-class nuclear attack submarine.
  - HMS Trafalgar, Trafalgar-class nuclear attack submarine.
  - HMS Bridport, Sandown-class minehunter.
  - HMS Inverness, Sandown-class minehunter.
  - HMS Sandown, Sandown-class minehunter.
  - HMS Brecon, Northern Ireland patrol vessel, former Hunt-class minehunter.
  - HMS Cottesmore, Northern Ireland patrol vessel, former Hunt-class minehunter.
  - HMS Dulverton, Northern Ireland patrol vessel, former Hunt-class minehunter.

The review also mentioned "significant" classified enhancements of British special forces, including strength increases and investment in new equipment.

Financially, in a Treasury spending review announced the week before, the budget would rise by £3.7bn from £29.7bn in 2004/2005 to £33.4bn in 2007/2008. The review also mentions £3bn to be invested into procuring new helicopters over the next ten years.

=== Future army structure ===
The future regimental structure, after changes were outlined in the review was announced in December 2004. Significant changes included:

- Creation of new 'Combat Service Support Formations', including:
  - 1st Military Intelligence Brigade
  - 12th Signal Group; reformed in 2004 to administer three reserve signals regiments, part of 2nd (National Communications) Signal Brigade
  - 8th Engineer Brigade
  - 2nd Medical Brigade
- Conversion of an armoured regiment to the formation reconnaissance role; Queen's Royal Lancers was selected.
- All single-battalion infantry regiments to be merged into existing or new regiments. This measure met with some opposition, especially in Scotland, amongst former soldiers and nationalist groups.
  - Royal Scots (Lothian Regiment), King's Own Scottish Borderers, Royal Highland Fusiliers (Princess Margaret's Own Glasgow and Ayrshire Regiment), The Highlanders (Seaforth, Gordons and Camerons), Argyll and Sutherland Highlanders (Princess Louise's) and TA elements amalgamated into the Royal Regiment of Scotland → Royal Scots (1 SCOTS) and King's Own Scottish Borderers (2 SCOTS) amalgamated shortly thereafter into the Royal Scots Borderers (new 1 SCOTS)
  - King's Own Royal Border Regiment, King's Regiment, and Queen's Lancashire Regiment and TA elements amalgamated into the Duke of Lancaster's Regiment → 3rd Bn shortly thereafter disbanded
  - Prince of Wales's Own Regiment of Yorkshire, The Green Howards (Alexandra, Princess of Wales's Own Yorkshire Regiment), Duke of Wellington's Regiment, and TA elements amalgamated into the Yorkshire Regiment
  - Cheshire Regiment, Worcestershire and Sherwood Foresters, Staffordshire Regiment (Prince of Wales'), and TA elements amalgamated into the Mercian Regiment
  - Royal Welch Fusiliers, Royal Regiment of Wales, and TA elements amalgamated into the Royal Welsh
  - Devonshire and Dorset Light Infantry, Royal Gloucestershire, Berkshire and Wiltshire Regiment, two battalions each of the Royal Green Jackets and The Light Infantry all amalgamated into The Rifles → first two units forming the 1st Battalion, all other redesignation
- Conversion of 4th Armoured Brigade to a mechanised brigade
- Conversion of 19th Mechanised Brigade to a light brigade (19 Light Brigade)
- Conversion of 52nd (Lowland) Infantry Brigade into a holding infantry brigade under 3rd (UK) Mechanised Division for battalions preparing to deploy on Operation Herrick (this change occurred in 2006/07)
- Conversion of a single battalion of the Parachute Regiment to a tri-service specialist special forces support battalion (see Special Forces Support Group)
- Reorganisation of the Territorial Army infantry into 14 battalions that are attached to regular infantry regiments of the British Army (below is the main mergers, however company sized changes did occur)
  - 52nd Lowland Volunteers → 52nd Lowland Volunteers, 6th Battalion Royal Regiment of Scotland
  - 51st Highland Volunteers → 51st Highland Volunteers, 7th Battalion Royal Regiment of Scotland
  - Lancastrian and Cumbrian Volunteers → 4th (Volunteer) Battalion, Duke of Lancaster's Regiment
  - Tyne-Tees Regiment → 5th (Volunteer) Battalion, Royal Regiment of Fusiliers
  - East of England Regiment → 3rd (Volunteer) Battalion, Royal Anglian Regiment
  - East and West Riding Regiment → 4th (Volunteer) Battalion, Yorkshire Regiment
  - West Midlands Regiment → 4th (Volunteer) Battalion, Mercian Regiment
  - Royal Welsh Regiment → 3rd (Volunteer) Battalion, Royal Welsh
  - Rifle Volunteers → 6th Battalion, The Rifles
  - Royal Rifle Volunteers → 7th Battalion, The Rifles
- Reduction in the number of British infantry battalions from 40 to 36 → reductions occurring in the Royal Irish Regiment following the end to Operation Banner
  - 2nd Battalion (Home Service); disbanded in 2007
  - 3rd Battalion (Home Service); disbanded in 2007
  - 4th Battalion (Home Service); disbanded in 2007
  - King's and Cheshire Regiment; disbanded in 2006 with companies going to 4 LANCS and 4 MERCIAN
- Reduction in the number and size of regular military bands in the Corps of Army Music from 29 to 23:
  - Band of the Royal Irish Regiment disbanded
  - Band of the Hussars and Light Dragoons and Band of the Royal Lancers amalgamated → Band of the Light Cavalry
  - Band of the Dragoon Guards and Cambrai Band of the Royal Tank Regiment → Heavy Cavalry (Cambrai) Band
  - Lowland Band of the Scottish Division and Highland Band of the Scottish Division amalgamated → Band of the Royal Regiment of Scotland
  - Normandy Band of the Queen's Division merged with Minden Band of the Queen's Division
  - Normandy Band of the King's Division and Waterloo Band of the King's Division amalgamated → Band of the King's Division
  - Clive Band of the Prince of Wales's Division and Lucknow Band of the Prince of Wales's Division amalgamated → Band of the Prince of Wales's Division
  - Band of the Light Division → Band and Bugles of The Rifles
- Reduction in the number of Army Air Corps helicopters based in Northern Ireland
- Creation of the Defence HUMINT Unit
- Creation of a new commando engineer regiment, later 24 Commando Engineer Regiment, Royal Engineers
- Creation of a new signals regiment, later 10th Signal Regiment

== See also ==
- Options for Change (1990)
- Front Line First (1994)
- Strategic Defence Review (1998)
- Strategic Defence and Security Review 2010
- Strategic Defence and Security Review 2015
