= Front Line First =

United Kingdom defence review of 1994

Front Line First: The Defence Cost Study
- Author: Ministry of Defence
- Language: English
- Publisher: Her Majesty's Stationery Office (HMSO)
- Publication date: 13 October 1994
- Publication place: United Kingdom
- Pages: 45
- ISBN: 978-0117728110
- OCLC: 633969002

Front Line First: The Defence Cost Study was a UK programme of defence cuts announced on 14 July 1994 by then Defence Secretary Malcolm Rifkind. Front Line First was announced four years after Options for Change, which was a military draw-down as a result of the end of the Cold War, often described as the "peace dividend". Critics such as the Labour defence spokesman Donald Anderson argued that the cuts were driven by the Treasury, however Rifkind argued that the front line of the armed forces was not affected and it was support staff and assets which were being cut; Rifkind stated that one of the major conclusion of the study was that the "Ministry of Defence and other headquarters at all levels are too large, too top heavy and too bureaucratic."

== Main changes ==
- Closure of Rosyth naval base, retained as a Royal Naval Support Establishment.
- Reduction of MOD civil servants by 7% (7,100)
- Reduction of armed forces personnel by 5% (11,600)
  - Royal Air Force - 7,500
  - British Army - 2,200
  - Royal Navy - 1,900
- These staff reductions included "more than 20 senior military and civilian jobs - that is Major-General level and above."
- Closure of 17 depots.
- Closure of 2 of the 3 military hospitals. Military wings to be set up at NHS hospitals.
- Army, Navy and Air Force headquarters to be merged into a Joint HQ at Northwood.
- Base closures:
  - RAF Scampton
  - RAF Finningley
  - RNAS Portland
  - Royal Marines Music School, Deal, Kent
  - RAF Laarbruch, Germany

== New equipment orders ==
- Confirmation of order for 259 Challenger II tanks.
- Confirmation of upgrade of 142 Tornado GR1s to GR4 standard.
- Confirmation of order for 7 Sandown-class minehunters.
- Intent to spend £300 million on laser-guided bombs and laser designators.
- Intent to order 400,000 rounds of 51mm from British Aerospace's Royal Ordnance.
- A new class of nuclear submarine would be ordered, the Batch 2 Trafalgar class (what would become the Astute-class submarines).
- A new class of amphibious assault ships would be ordered (what would become the Albion-class landing platform dock).
- Procurement of Tomahawk cruise missile to be studied.

== See also ==
- Options for Change (1990)
- Strategic Defence Review (1998)
- Delivering Security in a Changing World (2003)
- Strategic Defence and Security Review 2010
