= Princess of Wales's Royal Regiment =

Infantry regiment of the British Army

Princess of Wales's Royal Regiment (Queen's and Royal Hampshires)
- Badge of the regiment
- Active: 9 September 1992 – present
- Allegiance: United Kingdom
- Branch: British Army
- Type: Line infantry
- Role: 1st Battalion – Light infantry 3rd Battalion – Army Reserve; 4th Battalion – Army Reserve
- Size: Three battalions (Note: The old 2nd Battalion, PWRR (now 2nd Battalion, Ranger Regiment) is affiliated with the regiment, maintaining the traditions and lineage, but does not fall under the structure of the PWRR anymore.)
- Part of: Queen's Division
- Garrison/HQ: RHQ – London; 1st Battalion – Woolwich, London, and Episkopi Garrison; 3rd Battalion – Canterbury; 4th Battalion – Redhill
- Nickname: The Tigers
- Mottos: "Unconquered, I serve"
- March: Quick – The Farmer's Boy/Soldiers of the Queen; Slow – The Minden Rose
- Engagements: War on terror; Iraq War; Battle of Danny Boy; War in Afghanistan; Operation Diesel; Occupation of Iraq; Battle of the CIMIC House

Commanders
- Colonel of the Regiment: Major General James Martin

Insignia
- Tactical recognition flash

- Arm badge: Tiger; From Royal Hampshire Regiment
- Abbreviation: PWRR

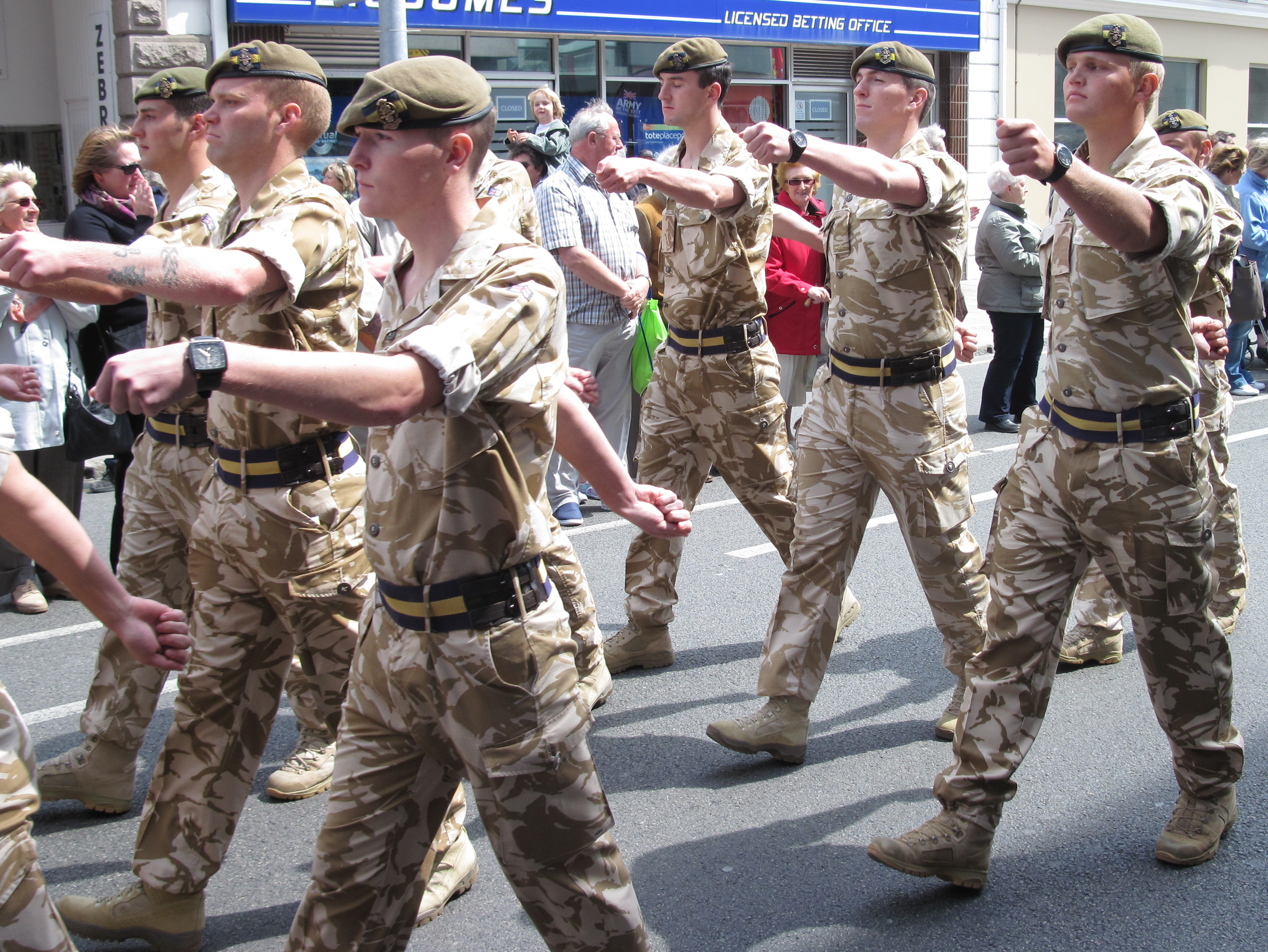
PWRR marching during Liberation Day, 9 May 2010 on Jersey

The Princess of Wales's Royal Regiment (PWRR), also known as the Tigers, is the senior English line infantry regiment of the British Army, second in the line infantry order of precedence to the Royal Regiment of Scotland and part of the Queen's Division.

== History ==
The Princess of Wales's Royal Regiment was formed on 9 September 1992 by the amalgamation of the Queen's Regiment and the Royal Hampshire Regiment and holds the earliest battle honour in the British Army (Tangier 1662–80). Through its ancestry via the Queen's Royal Regiment (West Surrey) (2nd Regiment of Foot), the PWRR is the most senior English line infantry regiment. The current regiment was named in honour of Diana, Princess of Wales.

Upon formation, the Princess of Wales was Colonel-in-Chief, and the Queen of Denmark was Allied Colonel-in-Chief of the PWRR. When the Princess divorced the Prince of Wales, she resigned as Colonel-in-Chief and the Queen of Denmark was appointed its Colonel-in-Chief.

The Queen of Denmark served as the Colonel-in-Chief until her abdication on 14 January 2024. A new Colonel-in-Chief has not yet been appointed.

=== 1st Battalion, The Princess of Wales's Royal Regiment ===
The 1st Battalion, The Princess of Wales's Royal Regiment (1 PWRR) served a two-year operational tour in Omagh, Northern Ireland from September 1993 to September 1995, then two short tours as the UK Standby Battalion in West Belfast and Armagh in 1996. This was followed by a further Northern Ireland tour in West Belfast during 1997–98, and a composite company from 1 PWRR subsequently served a short tour in Belfast to reinforce 1st Battalion The Highlanders in 1998.

In late April 1997, due to the insurgency crisis in Zaire (Democratic Republic of Congo), 1 PWRR, in its role as the designated high-readiness 'Spearhead Battalion' was deployed on a Non-combatant Evacuation Operation (NEO), codenamed Operation DETERMINANT, to evacuate British (non-combatant) personnel at risk from the civil war. 1 PWRR was supported by elements of 5 Airborne Brigade, 3 Commando Brigade, and the Royal Air Force.

In August 2000, 1 PWRR deployed for six months to Podujevo in the north-east of Kosovo, on Operation AGRICOLA 4. The Battle Group's primary role was to deter and prevent aggression from Serbia and to ensure a secure internal environment within Kosovo. In May 2002, 1 PWRR returned to Kosovo as the Pristina Battle Group, on Operation AGRICOLA 8 for a further six months.

From mid April 2004, 1 PWRR served a six-month tour in Iraq on Operation TELIC 4, with Battle Group Headquarters based at Camp Abu Naji. Before departing England's shores, the commanding officer had informed his battalion that it would be 'a tour like no other', and he was proved correct. The intense combat, in which Private Johnson Beharry won the Victoria Cross, thrust the Regiment into the media's full glare. Many of the operations carried out by the battalion during the tour were named after stations on the London Underground. In May, the Battle of Danny Boy, involved the first bayonet charge since the Falklands War. An idea of the intensity of the fighting can be gained from the operational awards, with no fewer than thirty-one gallantry honours, bestowed. By the end of the 2004 tour, the PWRR emerged as the most highly decorated infantry regiment in the British Army.

In April 2006, 1 PWRR returned to southern Iraq, as part of 20 Armoured Brigade. With the Iraqi insurgency in full spate, the battalion was repeatedly engaged in fierce and intense fighting. Again, the battalion distinguished itself and, over the course of several months, its soldiers won numerous gallantry awards for bravery. In November 2008, 1 PWRR deployed for its third tour of duty in Iraq on Operation TELIC 13 (less two sub-units which were instead deployed to Afghanistan). 1 PWRR helped train the Iraqi Army and oversaw the withdrawal of UK Forces from Basra, as this was the final British combat tour in Iraq. In May 2009, PWRR soldiers were the last British combat troops to drive out of Iraq and into Kuwait.

In August 2008, towards the end of Operation HERRICK 8, B Company Group 1 PWRR deployed to Helmand Province, Afghanistan for seven months as the Armoured Infantry Company Group to 16 Air Assault Brigade, and they were joined by the 1 PWRR Reconnaissance and Sniper Platoon. As an armoured force in theatre, they were in high demand and involved in heavy fighting. Subsequently, in October 2011, 1 PWRR deployed to Afghanistan to form the nucleus of the Police Mentoring Advisory Group (PMAG) with individual companies detached to other battlegroups around Helmand province. During this tour, 1 PWRR also achieved the most recent case of a successful bayonet charge, when Corporal Sean Jones led a charge during an ambush in the village of Kakaran, for which he was awarded the military cross.

As a result of Army 2020, 1 PWRR moved from Paderborn, Germany to be stationed at Bulford Camp.

In October 2023, 200 soldiers from 1 PWRR were deployed to northern Kosovo following increased tensions and the build-up of Serbian military in the region.

Since August 2024, 1 PWRR has been based at Episkopi Garrison, replacing the 1st Battalion Duke of Lancaster's Regiment as the Regional Standby Battalion.

=== 2nd Battalion, The Princess of Wales's Royal Regiment ===
In 1993, Gallipoli Company of 2nd Battalion, The Princess of Wales's Royal Regiment (2 PWRR) deployed to Forkhill in South Armagh, Northern Ireland for six months, to reinforce 1st Battalion, The Duke of Edinburgh's Royal Regiment. In late 1993, 2 PWRR deployed to Fermanagh for a six-month tour. Subsequently, in September 1995, 2 PWRR returned again to Northern Ireland on a two-year residential tour, taking over directly from 1 PWRR in Omagh. In late 1998, 2 PWRR deployed on a six-month tour of West Belfast and, in the summer of 2003, the battalion returned for a six-month tour of Drummad and Dungannon. Thereafter, and having only recently returned from operational service in Iraq, 2 PWRR deployed in December 2006 for a two-year tour based in Ballykelly, in Shackleton Barracks, Northern Ireland, the last resident battalion deployed in this role under Operation Banner.

In the immediate aftermath of Rwanda's 1994 genocide, A Company 2 PWRR deployed, in August, for a three-month tour on Operation GABRIEL. The PWRR task was to provide infantry force protection for the British contingent (BRITCON), whose role was to assist the international humanitarian effort in support of the UN Assistance Mission in Rwanda (UNAMIR).

In May 1994, shortly after the Bosnian-Croat Civil War, a rifle platoon from 2 PWRR, deployed to Bosnia-Hercegovina on Operation GRAPPLE 4, to reinforce BRITBAT. Subsequently, 2 PWRR deployed to Bosnia-Hercegovina on Operation PALATINE for a six-month tour in October 2000 as the UK Battle Group. In September 2007, C Company 2 PWRR deployed from Ballykelly, Northern Ireland, to Kosovo on operation OCULUS (K), in the International Surveillance and Reconnaissance Task Force (ISR TF) role.

In January 2005, 2 PWRR deployed to Basra Palace, Iraq for a six-month tour, arriving just in time to oversee the first Iraqi election, albeit the potential for violence remained volatile and extremely high. In the second month of the tour, B Company Group was tasked to take over from a Dutch contingent in Al Muthanna Province, an area of operations the size of Wales. In July, 2 PWRR returned to its Tern Hill Barracks, with just four months to prepare and train prior to its next operational deployment, to take over as the Ballykelly Resident Battalion in Northern Ireland.

In February 2008, 2 PWRR moved from Ballykelly, Northern Ireland to Dhekilia, Cyprus and, in June, assumed the role of the Afghanistan Theatre Reserve Battalion (TRB). During its tenure as TRB, Battle Group Headquarters and all Company Groups deployed sequentially to Afghanistan, covering a fifteen-month period, spanning Operation HERRICK 8 with 16 Air Assault Brigade, HERRICK 9 with 3 Commando Brigade, and HERRICK 10 with 19 Light Brigade. During its tenure in the TRB role, the infantrymen of 2 PWRR distinguished themselves during fierce fighting against the Taliban, and were duly honoured with a number of gallantry awards. In December 2008, Battle Group (Centre South) was established, and 2 PWRR assumed that role for the remainder of HERRICK 9, before handing over to 1st Battalion, The Welsh Guards. When, in July 2009, the commanding officer of the Welsh Guards was killed in action, 2 PWRR's commanding officer flew back to Afghanistan (from where he had only just returned to Cyprus) and assumed the role of interim commanding officer of the Welsh Guards.

After two years at Alexander Barracks in Dhekelia in Cyprus, 2 PWRR moved to Woolwich Garrison, London, to take up a public duties role in August 2010, a role they performed for three years. 2 PWRR then deployed to Cyprus again in 2014, as one of the infantry units rotating between the UK and British Forces Cyprus. In August 2017, 2 PWRR returned to the UK, based at Kendrew Barracks in Cottesmore, where they reconfigured two companies into a Light Mechanised Infantry force.

2 PWRR re-subordinated to the Ranger Regiment on 1 December 2021.

=== 3rd Battalion, The Princess of Wales's Royal Regiment (3 PWRR) ===
3 PWRR is an Army Reserve infantry battalion. It was formed by a merger of 5 PWRR and 6/7 PWRR in July 1999. It is headquartered in Canterbury, with companies in: Ashford (A Company), Brighton and Eastbourne (B Company), and Rochester (C Company). It is part of the 20 Armoured Brigade. Since 2022, 3 PWRR soldiers have deployed on operations and training exercises in Cyprus, Ethiopia, Uzbekistan, Turkmenistan, Denmark, Estonia and delivered training to Ukrainian soldiers in the UK.

=== 4th Battalion, The Princess of Wales's Royal Regiment (4 PWRR) ===
4 PWRR is an Army Reserve infantry battalion, which was formed in September 2017. It is headquartered in Redhill, and has companies based in: Farnham (A Company), Edgware and Hornsey (B Company), Portsmouth and Southampton (C Company), and Crawley (D Company). It is the only Army Reserve battalion within the Regular Army's 11 Brigade. Recently it has deployed soldiers to Kenya, Belize, France, Italy and Denmark for training, and regularly deploys volunteers on UK and international operations.

=== PWRR Reserve deployments to the Balkans, Iraq, Afghanistan, and Cyprus: 1992 to 2017 ===
From the late 1990s, during the relatively recent campaigns in the Balkans, Iraq, and Afghanistan, Reserve Forces accounted for some 10 per cent of overall UK force levels. Many of the PWRR reservists who deployed did so as individual reinforcements, such as those who deployed to the Balkans, but a number also deployed in formed composite sub-units, as platoons or companies.

During the Iraq War (2003–2011), individual reservists deployed on Operation TELIC 2, in 2003, from the Portsmouth-based PWRR Company of the Royal Rifle Volunteers (RRV). The RRV was a multi-cap-badge regiment, which at that time included the Portsmouth-based PWRR Company (until the RRV was later re-designated as 7th Battalion, The Rifles, at which time its PWRR company was placed under command of 3 PWRR, until, later still, being placed under command of 4 PWRR). The Commanding Officer and Regimental Sergeant Major of the RRV, for most of these early operational deployments, were both PWRR Regular officers.

Subsequently, from October 2003 to April 2004, during Operation TELIC 3, the RRV provided one of two platoons for 'Eden Company'; the other platoon was furnished by the East of England Regiment. Their role was Force Protection Company for HQ 20 Armoured Brigade, at Basra Palace. The commander and sergeant of the RRV platoon both hailed from the Portsmouth PWRR Company, as did a number of its soldiers. Moreover, individual reservists from 3 PWRR were also deployed elsewhere in Iraq on Operation TELIC 3.

From May to November 2005, during Operation TELIC 6, the RRV deployed 'Roebuck Company', comprising 110 reservists, which included a platoon from 3 PWRR. Its role was Force Protection Company for HQ Multi-National Division (South-East) in Basra, located at the Coalition Operating Base, at Basra Airport.

During the War in Afghanistan (2001–2021), the RRV was the third Reserve regiment to mobilise some fifty-four soldiers on Operation FINGAL. The two RRV platoons, which included Portsmouth-based PWRR reservists, deployed to Camp Souter for a four-month tour from February to May 2003. As part of the International Security Assistance Force (ISAF), their role was to form part of the Kabul Patrols Company, in concert with A Company, 2nd Battalion, The Royal Anglian Regiment. In May, the RRV was relieved in place by a sub-unit from 3 PWRR, which deployed for a six-month Operation FINGAL tour until September 2003.

During Operation HERRICK, which commenced in 2002, PWRR reservists served with both 1 PWRR and 2 PWRR, as well as other regimental battalions. In 2008, seventeen reservists from 3 PWRR served with the 5th Battalion, The Royal Regiment of Scotland. The London Regiment (LONDONS), a multi-cap-badge regiment, which at the time had under its command a PWRR Company, also maintained a steady flow of individual reservists to Helmand, a number of whom were from its PWRR Company. Moreover, during Operation HERRICK 12, the LONDONS deployed a company of reservists, of whom eighteen were from its PWRR Company.

During Operation HERRICK 15, 1 PWRR had forty-three individual reservists from 3 PWRR amongst its ranks. Subsequently, during Operation HERRICK 16, 1st Battalion, The Grenadier Guards was reinforced by the LONDONS, with thirteen of those reservists from its PWRR Company. Thereafter, in October 2012, during Operation HERRICK 17, 3 PWRR deployed thirty-three of its reservists to Afghanistan.

In 2015, in the aftermath of combat operations, 3 PWRR deployed a composite platoon, '2 Platoon', to Kabul, on Operation TORAL. It operated in the Force Protection role, alongside platoons from 1st Battalion, the Royal Anglian Regiment and the Royal Australian Regiment, in providing protection for instructors and mentors working at the Afghan National Army Officer Academy (ANAOA), often called 'Sandhurst in the Sand'.

The UN Peacekeeping Force in Cyprus (UNFICYP) is an operation in which, over time, a number of reservists have been engaged. Notably, in 2013, 3 PWRR deployed a cohort of troops on a six-month tour to undertake UNFICYP's multi-national Mobile Force Reserve (MFR) role. This tour was followed by another the following year, in which ten soldiers from the PWRR Company of the LONDONS deployed.

== Recruitment ==
The regiment recruits its soldiers from London, Kent, Surrey, Sussex, Hampshire, the Isle of Wight, and the Channel Islands.

== Structure ==
The Regimental Headquarters (RHQ) is at the Tower of London, whilst the regiment itself currently (as at 2026) comprises three battalions:

- 1st Battalion – Light Infantry based in Woolwich, London, or the Sovereign Base Areas of Akrotiri and Dhekelia, on a two-year rotation
- 3rd Battalion – Army Reserve Light Infantry serving with 20th Armoured Brigade Combat Team, paired with 1st Battalion Royal Anglian Regiment
- 4th Battalion – Army Reserve serving with 11th Brigade in the recce-strike role, paired with 1st Battalion Princess of Wales's Royal Regiment when in UK

== Regimental Museum ==
The Queen's & Princess of Wales's Royal Regiment Regimental Museum is in Dover Castle.

== Victoria Cross and other Decorations ==
Gallantry medals and awards bestowed upon 1 PWRR for their service during operations in Iraq in 2004 included a Victoria Cross, two Distinguished Service Orders, two Conspicuous Gallantry Crosses, one Member of the Order of the British Empire for gallantry, eight Military Crosses, one Queen's Commendation for Valuable Service, and sixteen Mentions in Despatches. Moreover, two further Military Crosses and three Mentions in Despatches were won by soldiers attached to the 1 PWRR Battle Group.

Private Johnson Beharry was awarded the Victoria Cross for his actions during 1 PWRR's deployment to Amarah, near Basra.

During 1 PWRR's subsequent tour in 2006, gallantry awards included one Conspicuous Gallantry Cross, one George Medal, four Military Crosses, and seven Mentions in Despatches. Moreover, a further three Military Crosses were won by soldiers attached to the 1 PWRR battle Group. This included the Military Cross won by Michelle Norris of the Royal Army Medical Corps who became the first woman to be awarded the Military Cross following her actions on 11 June 2006.

These 1 PWRR gallantry awards and those bestowed upon 2 PWRR and other regimental soldiers meant that the PWRR was the most decorated British Army regiment during the Second Gulf War.

== Battle Honours ==
The forebear Regiments of the Princess of Wales's Royal Regiment were awarded over 550 Battle Honours including "Tangier 1662–80", the oldest on any Colour, the following are emblazoned on the colours:

- King's Colour: Mons, Retreat from Mons, Aisne 1914, Ypres 1914 '15 '17 '18, Hill 60, Festubert 1915, Somme 1916 '18, Albert 1916 '18, Arras 1917 '18, Cambrai 1917 '18, Hindenburg Line, Italy 1917–18, Doiran 1917–18, Landing at Helles, Gaza, Jerusalem, Palestine 1917–18, Kut al Amara 1915 '17, Mesopotamia 1915–18, North West Frontier India 1915 1916–17, Dunkirk 1940, Normandy Landing, Caen, Rhine, North-West Europe 1944-45, Abyssinia 1941, El Alamein, Tebourba Gap, Hunt's Gap, Longstop Hill, North Africa 1940–43, Sicily 1943, Salerno, Anzio, Cassino, Gothic Line, Italy 1943–45, Malta 1940–42, Malaya 1941–42, Hong Kong, Defence of Kohima, Burma 1943–45
- Regimental Colour: Tangier 1662–80, Namur 1695, Gibraltar 1704–5, Blenheim, Ramillies, Oudenarde, Malplaquet, Dettingen, Minden, Louisburg, Guadeloupe 1759, Quebec 1759, Belleisle, Tournay, Barrosa, Martinique 1762, Seringapatam, Maida, Corunna, Talavera, Albuhera, Almaraz, Vittoria, Peninsula, Punniar, Moodkee, Sobraon, Inkerman, Sevastopol, Lucknow, Taku Forts, Pekin 1860, New Zealand, Afghanistan 1879–80, Nile 1884–85, Burma 1885–87, Relief of Ladysmith, Paardeberg, South Africa 1899–1902, Korea 1950–51

The Regimental Colour is particularly distinctive. The Colour is yellow and there is a unique combination of five badges displayed; the cap badge, the Naval Crown, the Tiger, the Sphinx and the cypher of Catherine of Braganza all linked to Regimental history:

- The Naval Crown superscribed "1st June 1794" – from the Queen's Royal Regiment (West Surrey)
- The Sphinx superscribed "Egypt 1801" – from the Queen's Royal Regiment (West Surrey) & Queen's Own Royal West Kent Regiment
- The cypher of Queen Catherine "1661", (wife of Charles II), intertwined/reversed letter "C" at the base of the laurel wreath from The Queen's Royal Regiment (West Surrey), in memory of the raising of the Regiment in 1661 when sent to garrison Tangier, part of Catherine of Braganza's dowry
- The Royal Tiger superscribed "India" – from the Royal Hampshire Regiment

== Colonels-in-Chief ==
Colonels-in-Chief have been as follows:

- 1992–1996: Diana, Princess of Wales
- 1997–2024: Queen Margrethe II of Denmark

== Order of Precedence ==
Preceded by Royal Regiment of Scotland	Infantry Order of Precedence	Succeeded by Duke of Lancaster's Regiment

== Lineage ==
1880	1881 Childers Reforms	1921 Name changes	1957 Defence White Paper	1966 Defence White Paper	1990 Options for Change	2003 Delivering Security in a Changing World
2nd (Queen's Royal) Regiment of Foot	The Queen's (Royal West Surrey Regiment)	The Queen's Royal Regiment (West Surrey)	The Queen's Royal Surrey Regiment	The Queen's Regiment	The Princess of Wales's Royal Regiment (Queen's and Royal Hampshires)	
31st (Huntingdonshire) Regiment of Foot	The East Surrey Regiment		The Queen's Royal Surrey Regiment	The Queen's Regiment	The Princess of Wales's Royal Regiment (Queen's and Royal Hampshires)	
70th (Surrey) Regiment of Foot	The East Surrey Regiment		The Queen's Royal Surrey Regiment	The Queen's Regiment	The Princess of Wales's Royal Regiment (Queen's and Royal Hampshires)	
3rd (East Kent, The Buff's) Regiment of Foot	The Buffs (East Kent Regiment) renamed in 1935: The Buffs (Royal East Kent Regiment)		The Queen's Own Buffs, The Royal Kent Regiment	The Queen's Regiment	The Princess of Wales's Royal Regiment (Queen's and Royal Hampshires)	
50th (Queen's Own) Regiment of Foot	The Queen's Own (Royal West Kent Regiment)	The Queen's Own Royal West Kent Regiment	The Queen's Own Buffs, The Royal Kent Regiment	The Queen's Regiment	The Princess of Wales's Royal Regiment (Queen's and Royal Hampshires)	
97th (Earl of Ulster's) Regiment of Foot	The Queen's Own (Royal West Kent Regiment)	The Queen's Own Royal West Kent Regiment	The Queen's Own Buffs, The Royal Kent Regiment	The Queen's Regiment	The Princess of Wales's Royal Regiment (Queen's and Royal Hampshires)	
35th (Royal Sussex) Regiment of Foot	The Royal Sussex Regiment			The Queen's Regiment	The Princess of Wales's Royal Regiment (Queen's and Royal Hampshires)	
107th (Bengal Infantry) Regiment of Foot	The Royal Sussex Regiment			The Queen's Regiment	The Princess of Wales's Royal Regiment (Queen's and Royal Hampshires)	
57th (West Middlesex) Regiment of Foot	The Duke of Cambridge's Own (Middlesex Regiment)	The Middlesex Regiment (Duke of Cambridge's Own)		The Queen's Regiment	The Princess of Wales's Royal Regiment (Queen's and Royal Hampshires)	
77th (East Middlesex) (Duke of Cambridge's Own) Regiment of Foot	The Duke of Cambridge's Own (Middlesex Regiment)	The Middlesex Regiment (Duke of Cambridge's Own)		The Queen's Regiment	The Princess of Wales's Royal Regiment (Queen's and Royal Hampshires)	
37th (North Hampshire) Regiment of Foot	The Hampshire Regiment renamed in 1946: The Royal Hampshire Regiment				The Princess of Wales's Royal Regiment (Queen's and Royal Hampshires)	
67th (South Hampshire) Regiment of Foot	The Hampshire Regiment renamed in 1946: The Royal Hampshire Regiment				The Princess of Wales's Royal Regiment (Queen's and Royal Hampshires)	

== Alliances ==
- Canada – The Queen's York Rangers (1st American Regiment)
- Canada – The South Alberta Light Horse
- Canada – 49th (Sault Ste Marie) Field Regiment, Royal Canadian Artillery
- Canada – The Queen's Own Rifles of Canada
- Canada – The Hastings and Prince Edward Regiment
- Canada – 1st Battalion, Royal New Brunswick Regiment (Carleton and York)
- Canada – The Essex and Kent Scottish Regiment
- Australia – The Royal New South Wales Regiment
- Australia – The Royal Western Australia Regiment
- Australia – University of New South Wales Regiment
- New Zealand – Hauraki Regiment
- New Zealand – Waikato Mounted Rifles
- Pakistan – 12th, 14th, 15th, and 17th Battalions, The Punjab Regiment
- Royal Navy – HMS Excellent
- Royal Marines – 40 Commando Royal Marines – Bond of friendship
- France – Le 35e Régiment d'Infanterie – Bond of Friendship
- Denmark – Den Kongelige Livgarde – Bond of Friendship
