= Brock Barracks =

Military building in Reading, Berkshire, England

- Reading, England
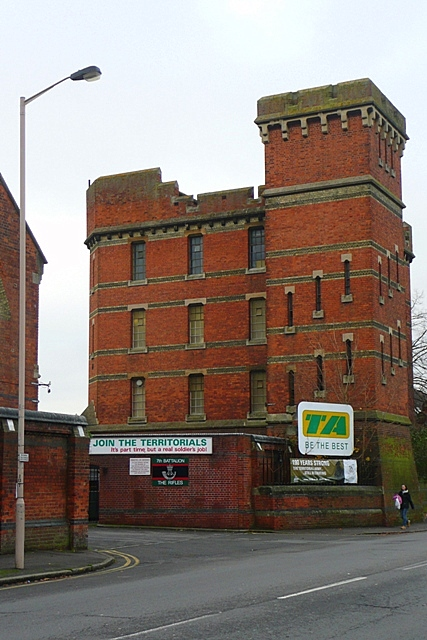
- Brock Barracks Keep

Site information
- Type: Headquarters building
- Owner: Ministry of Defence
- Operator: British Army

Location
- Location within Reading
- Coordinates: 51°27′29″N 01°00′12″W

Site history
- Built: 1881
- In use: 1881–present

Garrison information
- Garrison: 7th Battalion The Rifles

Brock Barracks is a British Army barracks in the town of Reading in the English county of Berkshire. Located on Oxford Road in the district of West Reading. The majority of the buildings and structures within Brock Barracks are Grade II listed.

== History ==
The barracks, which were named after Major-General Sir Isaac Brock, were built in the Fortress Gothic Revival Style and completed in 1881. Their creation took place as part of the Cardwell Reforms which encouraged the localisation of British military forces. The barracks became the depot for the 49th (Hertfordshire) Regiment of Foot and the 66th (Berkshire) Regiment of Foot. Following the Childers Reforms, the 49th and 66th regiments amalgamated to form the Royal Berkshire Regiment with its depot in the barracks later that year.

During the Second World War the 401st Glider Infantry Regiment of 101st Airborne of the United States Army were based at the barracks in preparation for the Normandy landings. The barracks ceased to be the home of the Royal Berkshire Regiment when that regiment merged with the Wiltshire Regiment to form the Duke of Edinburgh's Royal Regiment at Albany Barracks on the Isle of Wight in 1959. The Duke of Edinburgh's Royal Regiment retained their administrative headquarters at Brock Barracks until they moved to Cathedral Close in Salisbury in 1982.

The barracks continued in use as a Territorial Army base with D Company (Berkshire), Wessex Volunteers using the base from 1967: this unit evolved as D Company, the Wessex Regiment in 1972, the Royal Gloucestershire, Berkshire and Wiltshire Company, the Royal Rifle Volunteers in 1999 and HQ Company, 7th Battalion The Rifles in 2007.

== The Keep ==
On 12 May 1980 the Secretary of State for Defence sold the Keep, the Gatehouse and the original Gateway to Brock Barracks to Reading Borough Council. Since then Brock Keep has provided artists studios and exhibition space, and is currently occupied by OpenHand OpenSpace.
