= The Rifles =

Infantry regiment of the British Army

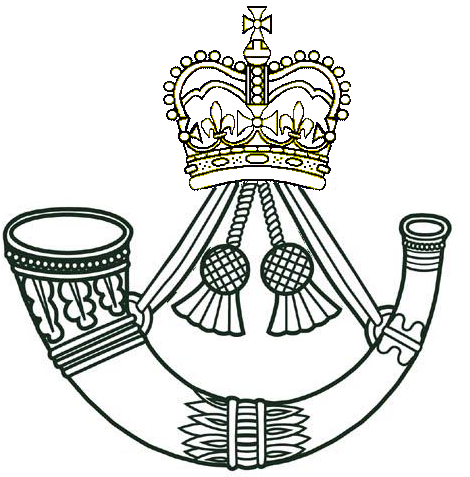
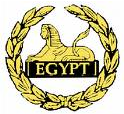
- Cap and Back badges of The Rifles
- Active: 2007–present
- Allegiance: United Kingdom
- Branch: British Army
- Type: Rifles
- Role: 1st Battalion—Mechanised Infantry; 2nd Battalion—Light Infantry; 3rd Battalion—Reconnaissance Strike Infantry; 5th Battalion—Armoured Infantry; 6th Battalion—Light Infantry; 7th Battalion—Armoured Infantry; 8th Battalion–Light Infantry
- Size: Seven battalions
- Part of: Light Division
- Garrison/HQ: RHQ—Winchester; 1st Battalion—Beachley Barracks, Chepstow; 2nd Battalion—Lisburn; 3rd Battalion—Edinburgh; 5th Battalion—Bulford; 6th Battalion—Exeter; 7th Battalion—Reading; 8th Battalion–Bishop Auckland
- Mottos: "Celer et Audax" (Latin) "Swift and Bold"
- Colours: Rifle Green
- March: Quick: "Mechanised Infantry"; Double Fast: "Keel Row/Road to the Isles"; Slow: "Old Salamanca"

Commanders
- Colonel in Chief: Queen Camilla
- Colonel Commandant: Lieutenant-General Sir Charles Collins

Insignia
- Tactical Recognition Flash

- Arm Badge: Croix de Guerre; From Devonshire and Dorset Light Infantry
- Abbreviation: RIFLES

The Rifles is an infantry regiment of the British Army. Formed in 2007, it consists of four Regular battalions and three Reserve battalions. Each Regular battalion was formerly an individual battalion of one of the two large regiments of the Light Division (with the exception of the 1st Battalion, which is an amalgamation of two individual regiments). The regiment was involved in the later stages of the Iraq War and in the War in Afghanistan.

== History ==
A regimental soldier in the Castlemartin Training Area, December 2021

The Rifles was created as a result of the Future Army Structure review. Under the original announcement, the Light Division would have remained essentially unchanged, with the exception of the Light Infantry gaining a new battalion through the amalgamation of two other regiments, and both gaining a reserve battalion from within the Territorial Army (TA) as it was then called. However, on 24 November 2005, the Ministry of Defence announced that the four regiments would amalgamate into a single five-battalion regiment. The regular battalions of The Rifles was formed on 1 February 2007 by the amalgamation of the four Light Infantry and Rifle Regiments of the Light Division as follows:

- 1st Battalion The Rifles (formed from the 1st Battalion, Devonshire and Dorset Light Infantry and the 1st Battalion Royal Gloucestershire, Berkshire and Wiltshire Light Infantry)
- 2nd Battalion The Rifles (formed from the 1st Battalion, Royal Green Jackets)
- 3rd Battalion The Rifles (formed from the 2nd Battalion, Light Infantry)
- 4th Battalion The Rifles (formed from the 2nd Battalion, Royal Green Jackets)
- 5th Battalion The Rifles (formed from the 1st Battalion, Light Infantry)
- 6th Battalion The Rifles (formed from the Rifle Volunteers)
- 7th Battalion The Rifles (formed from the Royal Rifle Volunteers minus the Princess of Wales's Royal Regiment Company but with the surviving two Companies (F and G) from The London Regiment)

The Rifles was formed to serve as the county regiment of the following counties:

- Berkshire
- Buckinghamshire
- Cornwall
- Devon
- Dorset
- Durham
- Gloucestershire
- Herefordshire
- Oxfordshire
- Shropshire
- Somerset
- South Yorkshire
- Wiltshire

The 2nd Battalion, the 3rd Battalion, and the 4th Battalion were all deployed in Basra in Iraq during some of the worst fighting of the Iraq War, including the withdrawal from Basra Palace in September 2007.

The 1st Battalion undertook a tour in Afghanistan between October 2008 and April 2009, ground holding and mentoring the Afghan National Army in Helmand Province.

The 5th Battalion was one of the last British Army units to leave Iraq in May 2009.

B and R Company, 4th Battalion, the Rifles provided reinforcement cover for the elections in Afghanistan and took part in Operation Panther's Claw in the Summer of 2009. At the same time, the 2nd Battalion was deployed to Sangin and was relieved in due course by 3 Rifles Battle group supported by A company and S Company, 4th Battalion, The Rifles.

The 1st battalion returned to the Nahr i Siraj District of Afghanistan in April 2011, to then be relieved by the 2nd and 5th Battalions in October 2011.

In March 2018, the 2nd Battalion returned home after a six-month operational deployment to Iraq in support of Operation Shader.

The regiment's 4th battalion was re-subordinated to the Ranger Regiment on 1 December 2021.

== Organisation ==
The regiment has four regular and three reserve battalions, each configured for a specific infantry role:

- 1st Battalion, an amalgamation of the 1st Battalion, Devonshire and Dorset Regiment and the 1st Battalion, Royal Gloucestershire, Berkshire and Wiltshire Regiment. Initially configured in the light role as part of 3 Commando Brigade, it moved to 160th Infantry Brigade and Headquarters Wales under Army 2020, before being transferred to the 7th Light Mechanised Brigade Combat Team in 2019. Personnel were based at Alexander Barracks, Cyprus from 2023 to 2025. In 2027, the battalion will move to Caerwent Station.
- 2nd Battalion, a redesignation of the 1st Battalion, Royal Green Jackets. Initially configured in the light role as part of 19 Light Brigade, it moved to 38th (Irish) Brigade under Army 2020, and is now part of the 51st (Scottish) Infantry Brigade. Personnel are based at Thiepval Barracks, Lisburn.
- 3rd Battalion, a redesignation of the 2nd Battalion, The Light Infantry. Initially configured in the light role as part of 52nd Infantry Brigade, it moved to 51st Infantry Brigade and Headquarters Scotland under Army 2020, before later forming part of the 1st Armoured Infantry Brigade. 3 RIFLES serves in the tactical recce-strike role in 11th Brigade. Personnel are based at Dreghorn Barracks, Edinburgh.
- 5th Battalion – redesignation of the 1st Battalion, The Light Infantry. Configured in the armoured infantry role as part of 20th Armoured Brigade Combat Team, it will remain as a Warrior battalion (converting to Boxer) under Army 2020. Personnel are based at Bulford Camp.
- 6th Battalion – redesignation of the Rifle Volunteers. It comes under 19th (Light) Brigade and is paired with 1 RIFLES. Headquarters is at Wyvern Barracks in Exeter with detachments in Cornwall, Devon, Dorset, Bristol, Gloucestershire and Herefordshire.
- 7th Battalion – redesignation of the Royal Rifle Volunteers, minus the Princess of Wales's Royal Regiment company, plus G Company of the London Regiment (the descendants of the 4th (V) Battalion the Royal Green Jackets). 7 RIFLES primarily covers the areas of London and the South East. It forms part of the 20th Armoured Brigade Combat Team and is paired with 5 RIFLES.
- 8th Battalion – Formed on 1 November 2017. The battalion primarily covers the areas of County Durham, Yorkshire, Shropshire and Birmingham, with headquarters located in Bishop Auckland, County Durham. The Battalion is paired with 2 RIFLES.

== Colonels ==
Queen Camilla is the Colonel-in-Chief of the Regiment, whilst each battalion has its own Royal Colonel:

=== List of Colonels-in-Chief ===
- 2007–2020: Prince Philip, Duke of Edinburgh
- 2020–present: Queen Camilla (formerly the Duchess of Cornwall)

=== Royal Colonels ===
- 1st Battalion, The Rifles: Prince Edward, Duke of Kent (ex-Colonel-in-Chief, DDLI)
- 2nd Battalion, The Rifles: Prince Edward, Duke of Edinburgh
- 3rd Battalion, The Rifles: Princess Alexandra, The Honourable Lady Ogilvy (ex-Colonel-in-Chief, LI)
- 5th Battalion, The Rifles: Sophie, Duchess of Edinburgh
- 6th Battalion, The Rifles: Prince Richard, Duke of Gloucester
- 7th Battalion, The Rifles: Birgitte, Duchess of Gloucester
- 8th Battalion, The Rifles: Vacant

=== Colonel Commandant ===
- 2019–2023: General Sir Patrick Sanders
- 2023–2026: Lieutenant General Sir Tom Copinger-Symes
- 2026–present: Lieutenant General Sir Charles Collins

== Regimental bands ==
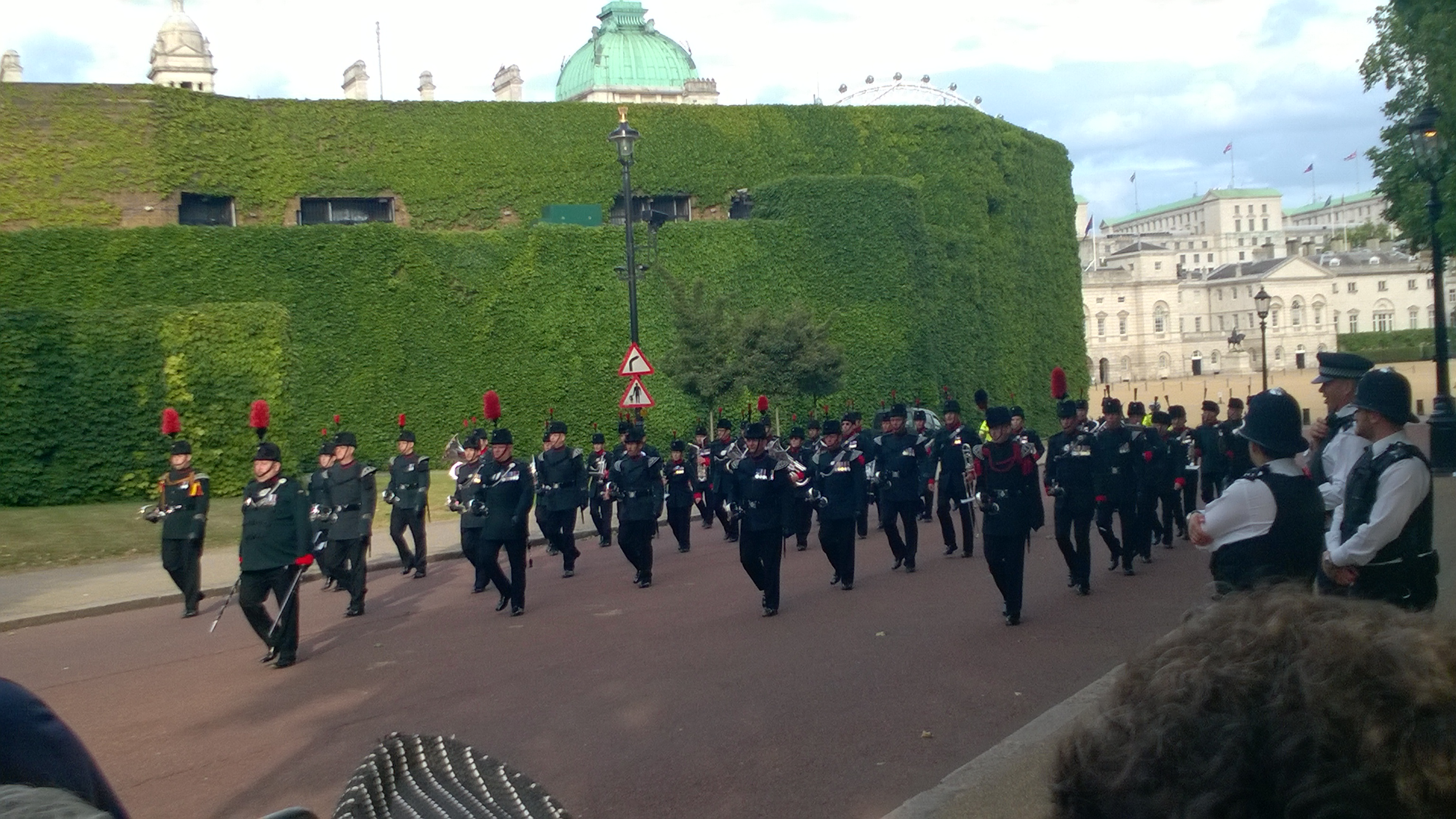
The Waterloo Band of The Rifles in London

The regular element of The Rifles maintains a single regular regimental band, the Band and Bugles of The Rifles. The band form one of 14 professional bands within the Royal Corps of Army Music. This was formed by renaming the Band and Bugles of the Light Division, which in itself was an amalgamation of four separate bands:

- The Corunna Band of the Light Infantry
- The Salamanca Band of the Light Infantry
- The Peninsula Band of the Royal Green Jackets
- The Normandy Band of the Royal Green Jackets

In addition, the two Army Reserve Battalions maintain their own bands:

- The Salamanca Band of the Rifles – 6th Battalion (formerly the Band of the Rifle Volunteers)
- The Waterloo Band of the Rifles – 7th Battalion (formerly the Band of the Royal Rifle Volunteers)

=== Band and Bugles ===
The Band and Bugles of The Rifles is the most senior band in the regiment based in the Rifles. The central Band of The Rifles are based at Sir John Moore Barracks in Winchester. The band is notable in that buglers accompany the band in the front rank. Since 2016, Major Jason Griffiths has served as the director of the band and bugles.

=== Salamanca Band (6th Battalion) ===
The Salamanca Band is a 35-member band based at Exeter, being part of the 6th Reserve Battalion. The Devonshire and Dorset Regiment formed the former Band of the Rifle Volunteers. It formed the backbone of the Salamanca Band. The band also has a detachment in Truro. In the summer of 2017, the band went on a tour of the Caucasus, visiting Armenia, Azerbaijan and Georgia, performing with the Band of the General Staff, the Band of the National Guard and the Band of the Ministry of Defence respectively for public performances. On the Georgia visit, the band performed Tbiliso, which is the unofficial anthem of the City of Tbilisi, was also performed during a concert on a bridge in the neighborhood of Metekhi. In April 2016, the first musician to serve as an army vocalist came from The Salamanca Band.

=== Waterloo Band (7th Battalion) ===
The Waterloo Band is a 35-member band based in Abingdon, being part of the 7th Reserve Battalion. The Waterloo Band has performed at events across the UK and the world such as the Basel Tattoo in 2014.

=== Sounding Retreat ===
Sounding Retreat is a ceremony similar to Beating Retreat. The main difference between this ceremony and the regular Beating Retreat is that this is performed by the bugle bands of The Rifles, as well as the former of the bands of the Britain's Light Division, rather than using drums, as is the case with other infantry regiments. This traditional ceremony (which represents the sounding of Sunset or Retreat in the British Army) has been done on 31 May and 1 June on Horse Guards Parade as recently as 1993 and 2016. Besides the Band and Bugles of the Rifles, the Band of the Brigade of Gurkhas also takes part in the ceremony.

== Golden threads ==
As a rifle regiment, a private soldier in The Rifles is known as a Rifleman and Serjeant is spelt in the archaic fashion; the regiment wears a rifle green beret. A number of golden threads i.e. distinctive honours have been brought into the new regiment from each of its founder regiments:

- Croix de Guerre – the French Croix de Guerre ribbon awarded to the Devonshire Regiment in the First World War, and subsequently worn by the Devonshire and Dorset Light Infantry, and also awarded to the King's Shropshire Light Infantry in 1918, is worn on both sleeves of No. 1 and No. 2 dress.
- Back badge – the badge worn on the back of headdress reads 'Egypt'. This was awarded as an honour to the 28th Foot and subsequently worn by the Royal Gloucestershire, Berkshire and Wiltshire Light Infantry. It is worn on the forage cap and side hat; and on the shako of the regimental band and bugles.
- Bugle horn – the bugle horn badge of the Light Infantry, now surmounted by St. Edward's Crown, is the regiment's cap badge.
- Maltese Cross – the Maltese Cross of the Royal Green Jackets is worn as a buckle on the cross belt, and contains the regiment's representative battle honours; currently one space is kept free for future honours. In accordance with the tradition of rifle regiments, the regiment does not carry colours.
- Black buttons – the traditional black buttons of a rifle regiment are worn on all forms of dress, with the exception of combat dress.
- Double past – the march played when the regiment moves at double time is an amalgam of 'Keel Row', the double past of the Light Infantry, and 'The Road to the Isles', the double past of the Royal Green Jackets.
- Marching speed – The Rifles march at 140 paces to the minute, compared to the Army standard of 120 paces, retain the custom of the double past on ceremonial parades, and never slow march. This originates from historically conducting advance guard and flanking duties, which required rifle units to move around the battlefield faster than the rest of the army. On parade, the length of a pace is reduced to ensure the Rifles maintain the same marching speed as other units.

== Battle honours ==
The following battle honours are a representation of the total honours awarded to the regiments which formed The Rifles. These are inscribed on the regiment's belt badge:

- Gibraltar, Copenhagen, Plassey, Dettingen, Minden, Quebec, Martinique, Marabout, Peninsula, Waterloo, Afghanistan, Jellalabad, Ferozeshah, Delhi, Lucknow, New Zealand, Pekin, South Africa, Inkerman
- Great War: Nonne Boschen, Ypres, Somme, Vittorio Veneto, Megiddo
- Second World War: Calais, First Battle of El Alamein, Second Battle of El Alamein, Kohima, Pegasus Bridge, Normandy, Italy 1943–45, Anzio
- Imjin, Korea, Iraq 2003

== Regimental museum ==
The regiment's museum is The Rifles Museum at Peninsular Barracks in Winchester.

== Alliances ==
The regiment inherited its alliances from its predecessors, and these alliances are:

- Canada – Les Voltigeurs de Québec
- Canada – The Royal Canadian Regiment
- Canada – Princess Patricia's Canadian Light Infantry
- Canada – The Lincoln and Welland Regiment
- Canada – The Algonquin Regiment (Northern Pioneers)
- Canada – The Royal Hamilton Light Infantry (Wentworth Regiment)
- Canada – Le Régiment de Maisonneuve
- Canada – The North Saskatchewan Regiment
- Canada – The British Columbia Regiment (Duke of Connaught's Own)
- Canada – The Queen's Own Rifles of Canada
- Canada – The Brockville Rifles
- Canada – The Royal Winnipeg Rifles
- Canada – The Royal Regina Rifles
- Australia – 11th/28th Battalion, Royal Western Australia Regiment
- Australia – Western Australia University Regiment
- Australia – Sydney University Regiment
- Australia – Melbourne University Regiment
- Australia – Royal New South Wales Regiment
- New Zealand – Hauraki Regiment
- New Zealand – 1st Battalion, Royal New Zealand Infantry Regiment
- New Zealand – 2nd/4th Battalion, Royal New Zealand Infantry Regiment
- New Zealand – 3rd/6th Battalion, Royal New Zealand Infantry Regiment
- New Zealand – 5th/7th Battalion, Royal New Zealand Infantry Regiment
- Kenya – Kenya Army Infantry
- Kenya – 1st Battalion, Kenyan Rifles
- Kenya – 3rd Battalion, Kenyan Rifles
- Malaysia – 6th Battalion, Royal Malay Regiment
- Pakistan – 1st Battalion, Sindh Regiment
- Pakistan – 2nd Battalion, Frontier Force Regiment
- Pakistan – 13th Battalion, Frontier Force Regiment
- Pakistan – 11th Battalion, Baloch Regiment
- Pakistan – 13th Battalion, Baloch Regiment
- South Africa – Chief Langalibalele Rifles
- South Africa – Rand Light Infantry
- South Africa – Durban Light Infantry
- South Africa – Buffalo Volunteer Rifles
- Fiji – Fiji Infantry Regiment
- Ghana – 1st Battalion, Ghana Regiment
- Mauritius – Special Mobile Force

Bond of Friendship

- South Africa – 5 South African Infantry Battalion
- France – 2e Régiment Étranger d'Infanterie
- Royal Air Force – A Flight, No. 22 Squadron RAF

== Order of precedence ==
Preceded by Royal Gurkha Rifles	Infantry Order of Precedence	Succeeded by Special Air Service

== Lineage ==
1880	1881 Childers Reforms	1921 Name changes	1957 Defence White Paper	1966 Defence White Paper	1990 Options for Change	2003 Delivering Security in a Changing World
11th (North Devon) Regiment of Foot	The Devonshire Regiment		The Devonshire and Dorset Regiment			The Rifles
39th (Dorsetshire) Regiment of Foot	The Dorsetshire Regiment		The Devonshire and Dorset Regiment			The Rifles
54th (West Norfolk) Regiment of Foot	The Dorsetshire Regiment		The Devonshire and Dorset Regiment			The Rifles
13th (1st Somersetshire) (Prince Albert's Light Infantry) Regiment of Foot	Prince Albert's Light Infantry (Somersetshire Regiment)	The Somerset Light Infantry (Prince Albert's)	The Somerset and Cornwall Light Infantry	The Light Infantry		The Rifles
32nd (Cornwall Light Infantry) Regiment of Foot	The Duke of Cornwall's Light Infantry		The Somerset and Cornwall Light Infantry	The Light Infantry		The Rifles
46th (South Devonshire) Regiment of Foot	The Duke of Cornwall's Light Infantry		The Somerset and Cornwall Light Infantry	The Light Infantry		The Rifles
51st (2nd Yorkshire, West Riding, King's Own Light Infantry) Regiment of Foot	The King's Own Light Infantry (South Yorkshire Regiment)	King's Own Yorkshire Light Infantry		The Light Infantry		The Rifles
105th (Madras Light Infantry) Regiment of Foot	The King's Own Light Infantry (South Yorkshire Regiment)	King's Own Yorkshire Light Infantry		The Light Infantry		The Rifles
53rd (Shropshire) Regiment of Foot	The King's Light Infantry (Shropshire Regiment)	The King's Shropshire Light Infantry		The Light Infantry		The Rifles
85th (Bucks Volunteers) (King's Light Infantry) Regiment of Foot	The King's Light Infantry (Shropshire Regiment)	The King's Shropshire Light Infantry		The Light Infantry		The Rifles
68th (Durham) (Light Infantry) Regiment of Foot	The Durham Light Infantry			The Light Infantry		The Rifles
106th (Bombay Light Infantry) Regiment of Foot	The Durham Light Infantry			The Light Infantry		The Rifles
28th (North Gloucestershire) Regiment of Foot	The Gloucestershire Regiment				The Royal Gloucestershire, Berkshire and Wiltshire Regiment	The Rifles
61st (South Gloucestershire) Regiment of Foot	The Gloucestershire Regiment				The Royal Gloucestershire, Berkshire and Wiltshire Regiment	The Rifles
49th (Hertfordshire) (Princess Charlotte of Wales's) Regiment of Foot	Princess Charlotte of Wales's (Berkshire Regiment)	The Royal Berkshire Regiment (Princess Charlotte of Wales's)	The Duke of Edinburgh's Royal Regiment (Berkshire and Wiltshire)		The Royal Gloucestershire, Berkshire and Wiltshire Regiment	The Rifles
66th (Berkshire) Regiment of Foot	Princess Charlotte of Wales's (Berkshire Regiment)	The Royal Berkshire Regiment (Princess Charlotte of Wales's)	The Duke of Edinburgh's Royal Regiment (Berkshire and Wiltshire)		The Royal Gloucestershire, Berkshire and Wiltshire Regiment	The Rifles
62nd (Wiltshire) Regiment of Foot	The Duke of Edinburgh's (Wiltshire Regiment)	The Wiltshire Regiment (Duke of Edinburgh's)	The Duke of Edinburgh's Royal Regiment (Berkshire and Wiltshire)		The Royal Gloucestershire, Berkshire and Wiltshire Regiment	The Rifles
99th (Duke of Edinburgh's) Regiment of Foot	The Duke of Edinburgh's (Wiltshire Regiment)	The Wiltshire Regiment (Duke of Edinburgh's)	The Duke of Edinburgh's Royal Regiment (Berkshire and Wiltshire)		The Royal Gloucestershire, Berkshire and Wiltshire Regiment	The Rifles
43rd (Monmouthshire Light Infantry) Regiment of Foot	The Oxfordshire Light Infantry renamed in 1908: The Oxfordshire and Buckinghamshire Light Infantry		1st Green Jackets (43rd and 52nd)	The Royal Green Jackets		The Rifles
52nd (Oxfordshire) (Light Infantry) Regiment of Foot	The Oxfordshire Light Infantry renamed in 1908: The Oxfordshire and Buckinghamshire Light Infantry		1st Green Jackets (43rd and 52nd)	The Royal Green Jackets		The Rifles
60th (King's Royal Rifle Corps) Regiment of Foot	The King's Royal Rifle Corps		2nd Green Jackets, The King's Royal Rifle Corps	The Royal Green Jackets		The Rifles
Rifle Brigade (The Prince Consort's Own)	The Prince Consort's Own (Rifle Brigade)		3rd Green Jackets, The Rifle Brigade	The Royal Green Jackets		The Rifles

== See also ==
- Pegasus Bridge
