= Royal Gloucestershire, Berkshire and Wiltshire Regiment =

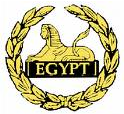
- Cap and back badges of the Royal Gloucestershire, Berkshire and Wiltshire Regiment
- Active: 1994–2007
- Allegiance: United Kingdom
- Branch: British Army
- Type: Line Infantry
- Role: Light Role Infantry
- Size: Two battalions
- Part of: Light Division
- Garrison/HQ: 1st Battalion - Chester
- Colors: PUC carried on regimental colour
- March: Quick - The Farmers Boy; Slow - Scipio

Commanders
- Last Colonel-in-Chief: The Duke of Edinburgh
- Colonel of the Regiment: General Sir Kevin O'Donoghue KCB CBE

Insignia
- Arm Badge: Distinguished Unit Citation; From Gloucestershire Regiment

The Royal Gloucestershire, Berkshire and Wiltshire Regiment was a short-lived infantry regiment of the British Army.

== History ==
The regiment was formed in 1994 by the amalgamation of the Gloucestershire Regiment and the Duke of Edinburgh's Royal Regiment (Berkshire and Wiltshire).

It was the only regiment in the British Army whose members were permitted to wear a cap badge on both the front and the rear of their headdress. The back badge was awarded to the 28th Regiment of Foot for their actions at the Battle of Alexandria in 1801 when the regiment fought on whilst completely surrounded by the enemy.

The regiment was also unique in the British Army in that it was permitted to wear the United States Presidential Unit Citation, which it inherited from the 1st Battalion, Gloucestershire Regiment which was awarded for their defence of Gloster Hill during the Battle of the Imjin River in April 1951 during the Korean War.

Between 2002 and 2005, the 1st Battalion, Royal Gloucestershire, Berkshire and Wiltshire Regiment served as a public duties battalion in London, where its duties included providing the Queen's Guard. It was while the RGBW was on guard at Buckingham Palace that the Fathers 4 Justice protest took place.

In April 2004, 16 Territorial Army soldiers from the regiment joined the TA Force Protection Company, Salamanca Company, and deployed to Iraq as part of Operation Telic.

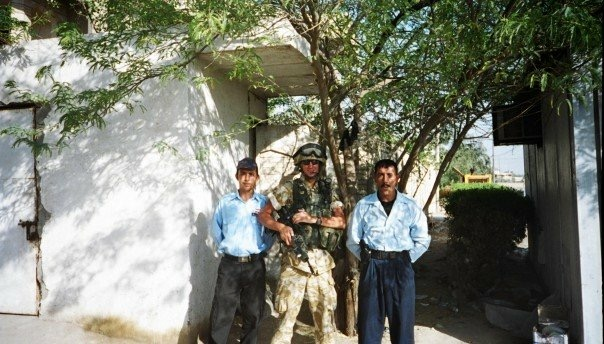
RGBW soldier in Iraq.

On 16 December 2004, the Ministry of Defence announced a reorganisation of the infantry regiments. In preparation for this, the regiment was moved from the Prince of Wales' Division to the Light Division and renamed the Royal Gloucestershire, Berkshire and Wiltshire Light Infantry in July 2005.

On 24 November 2005, the Ministry of Defence announced further changes to the amalgamations. The regiment would amalgamate with the Devonshire and Dorset Regiment, the Royal Green Jackets and The Light Infantry to form a new large regiment to be called The Rifles. The new regiment came into existence in 2007.

The Colours of the 1st Battalion were laid up at the Soldiers of Gloucestershire Museum in Gloucester and the Colours of the 2nd Battalion were laid up at the Wardrobe, home of The Rifles Berkshire and Wiltshire Museum in Salisbury.

== Volunteers ==
In 1995, the regiment formed its own territorial battalion: 2nd (Volunteer) Battalion, Royal Gloucestershire, Berkshire and Wiltshire Regiment, through the amalgamation of the 1st and 2nd Battalions of the Wessex Regiment. Its structure was:

- HQ (Berkshire) Company, at Brock Barracks, Reading
  (from D Company, 2nd Battalion, Wessex Regiment)
  - Assault Pioneer Platoon, at Cinderford
- A (Gloucester) Company, at Gloucester and Cheltenham
  (from A and C Companies, 1st Battalion, Wessex Regiment)
- B (City of Bristol) Company, at Bristol
  (from B Company, 1st Battalion, Wessex Regiment)
- C (Wiltshire) Company, at Devizes and Swindon
  (from HQ and B Companies, 1st Battalion, Wessex Regiment)

In 1999 the battalion was split up, with A and B Companies amalgamating to form The Royal Gloucestershire, Berkshire and Wiltshire Regiment Company, Rifle Volunteers; and HQ and C Companies amalgamating to form The Royal Gloucestershire, Berkshire and Wiltshire Regiment Company, Royal Rifle Volunteers.

== Alliances ==
- Canada - The Royal Canadian Regiment
- Canada - The Lincoln and Welland Regiment
- Canada - The Algonquin Regiment
- Australia - 11th/28th Battalion, The Royal Western Australia Regiment
- Pakistan - 13th Battalion, The Frontier Force Regiment
- Kenya - 3rd Battalion, The Kenya Rifles
- South Africa - The Cape Town Rifles
- Royal Navy - HMS Gloucester

== See also ==
- Non US Winners of US gallantry awards
