= Camp Souter =

Former British Armed Forces base in Kabul, Afghanistan

Camp Souter
- Kabul, Kabul Province in Afghanistan

Site information
- Type: Camp
- Owner: International Security Assistance Force
- Operator: British Armed Forces

Location
- Shown within Afghanistan
- Coordinates: 34°33′12.3″N 69°14′07.7″E

Site history
- Built: 2002
- In use: 2002-2021

Garrison information
- Past commanders: Captain A W Pledger

Camp Souter is a former Military base located in Kabul, Afghanistan operated by the United Kingdom as part of International Security Assistance Force (ISAF) under Operation Herrick (OP H).

== Units ==
- OP Herrick 5 - (October 2006 - April 2007)
  - Elements of Royal Navy and Royal Marines personnel attached to 3 Commando Brigade and Commando Logistics Regiment providing the Medical support from Royal Navy MA's
  - The 2nd Battalion Royal Regiment of Fusiliers
- OP Herrick 6 - (April 2007 - October 2007)
  - 23 Pioneer Regiment RLC: 187 SQN 206 SQN 518 SQN Kabul patrols company
- OP Herrick 7 - (October 2007 - April 2008)
  - No. 1 Company, 1st Battalion, Coldstream Guards
  - Sniper Section, 1st Battalion, Coldstream Guards
- OP Herrick 8 - (April 2008 – October 2008)
  - A Company, Royal Highland Fusiliers, 2nd Battalion, The Royal Regiment of Scotland (2 SCOTS)
- Souter Force Protection Transport Company (2012)
