= The Road to the Isles =

Song by Pipe Major John McLellan

- 1924 version by contralto Minnie Mearns

Song
- Published: 1917
- Genre: Folk
- Composer: John McLellan
- Lyricist: Kenneth Macleod

"The Road to the Isles" is a tune composed by Pipe Major John McLellan DCM which was originally called "The Bens of Jura", although it previously had other titles. It is part of the Kennedy-Fraser collection, and it appeared in a book entitled Songs of the Hebrides, published in 1917, with the eponymous title by the Celtic poet Kenneth Macleod. The poem is headed by the statement "Written for the lads in France during the Great War." The impression is given by the notes appended to the book that the author was Kenneth Macleod himself. Marjory Kennedy-Fraser toured the Western Isles of Scotland in the summer of 1917 and collected a group of local tunes. The tune associated with the "Road to the Isles" was an air played by Malcolm Johnson of Barra, on a chanter, and composed by Pipe Major John McLellan of Dunoon (originally titled "The Bens of Jura" and "The Burning Sands of Egypt"). Macleod then wrote the words for a voice and harp (or piano) arrangement of this air by Patuffa Kennedy-Fraser.

The tune was written as a march for the British Army. It is said to have been played by Bill Millin, piper to Simon Fraser, 15th Lord Lovat, during the first day of the Normandy Landings on D-Day during World War II, during a Commando attack during Operation Roast in the Spring 1945 offensive in Italy.

The lyrics mention first the hills of the Isle of Skye (whose memory is calling the traveller west), then the successive locations he will pass on the way across the Western Highlands and Inner and Outer Hebrides. The locations mentioned are: the Cuillin Hills, Tummel and Loch Rannoch, Lochaber, Shiel, Ailort, Morar, the Skerries (rocky islets – in this case, just off Skye), and the Lews.

A cromach (or cromack) is a shepherd's crook or stick. "Tangle", or sea tangle, is oarweed or similar seaweed.

== Lyrics ==
A far croonin' is pullin' me away
As take I wi' my cromach to the road.
The far Cuillins are puttin' love on me
As step I wi' the sunlight for my load.

Chorus
Sure by Tummel and Loch Rannoch and Lochaber I will go
By heather tracks wi' heaven in their wiles.
If it's thinkin' in your inner heart the braggart's in my step
You've never smelled the tangle o' the Isles.
Oh the far Cuillins are puttin' love on me
As step I wi' my cromach to the Isles.

It's by Shiel water the track is to the west
By Ailort and by Morar to the sea
The cool cresses I am thinkin' of for pluck
And bracken for a wink on Mother's knee.

Repeat chorus

The blue islands are pullin' me away
Their laughter puts the leap upon the lame
The blue islands from the Skerries to the Lews
Wi' heather honey taste upon each name.

== Influence ==
A number of parodies have been based upon the tune to this song. Notable examples include "Leo McGuire's Song" by Billy Connolly and "Scottish Holiday" by The Corries.

The tune was used by Ewan MacColl for his rambling song "Mass Trespass 1932", a forerunner of his song "The Manchester Rambler".

The Wiggles used this tune as "Do the Highland Fling" on their "Dance, Dance!" CD and DVD and "Nursery Rhymes" YouTube video and CD.
