= Devonshire and Dorset Regiment =

- Active: 1958 – 2007
- Country: United Kingdom
- Branch: British Army
- Type: Line infantry
- Role: Infantry
- Size: Two battalions
- Part of: Prince of Wales' Division
- Motto: Semper Fidelis Latin: "Always Faithful"
- March: Quick – Widdecombe Fair/We've Lived and Loved Together/The Maid of Glenconnel

Insignia
- Tactical Recognition Flash

- Arm Badge: Croix de Guerre; From Devonshire Regiment

The Devonshire and Dorset Regiment (11th, 39th and 54th), usually just known as the Devon and Dorsets, was an infantry regiment of the British Army formed in 1958 by the amalgamation of two county regiments, the Devonshire Regiment and the Dorset Regiment. In 2007 it was itself merged into The Rifles, a "large regiment". Members of the regiments referred to themselves as being a Janner.

== Formation ==
As part of the 1957 Defence Review, it was announced that there would be a reduction in the number of infantry battalions in the British Army. The reduction was to be effected by the merging of a number of pairs of regiments.

Among the mergers to be carried out were those of the regiments of the two neighbouring counties of Devon and Dorset.

- Devonshire Regiment (the former 11th Regiment of Foot, originally raised in 1685)
- Dorset Regiment (the successor to the 39th Foot, raised in 1702; and the 54th Foot, dating from 1755)

The amalgamation took place in Minden, Germany, on 17 May 1958. The new 1st Battalion, Devonshire and Dorset Regiment was commanded by Lieutenant-Colonel Guy Young, formerly commanding officer of the 1st Devonshires, while the colonel of the regiment was Major-General George Neville Wood, formerly of the Dorsets.

== Service ==
=== 1960s ===
In November 1958 the 1st Battalion moved to Cyprus, where they carried out anti-insurgency activities against the paramilitary EOKA organisation. A ceasefire was called in December 1959, and the island achieved independence from Britain in August 1960. Following the ending of the conflict the battalion carried out exercises in Libya before returning to the United Kingdom in 1961.

From 1961 to 1963 the battalion was based in Plymouth, taking part in exercises in the Salisbury Plain Training Area and in recruitment activities following the ending of National Service. In May 1962 the regiment was given the freedom of the City of Exeter, and were presented with a stand of colours by the Colonel-in-Chief, Princess Marina, Duchess of Kent.

From July 1963 the battalion was based in Holywood, County Down. Placed on twenty-four hours' travel notice, in May 1964 they moved to British Guiana where there was political and civil unrest. Elections were held in December of that year, a first step in the independence of the colony. The battalion returned to Holywood in January 1965.

In February 1966 the battalion joined the British Army of the Rhine (BAOR) as part of 6th Infantry Brigade based in Münster. In 1967 disturbances spread throughout the Arab world in the wake of the Six-Day War. The battalion were dispatched to Benghazi in Libya to evacuate isolated British personnel. In January 1968 the regiment were transferred within the BAOR to the 12th Infantry Brigade based in Osnabrück. In 1970 the battalion moved to Malta. Following the outbreak of The Troubles in Northern Ireland, the Devon and Dorsets were moved to Belfast with less than twenty four hours' notice in June 1970. They found themselves involved in the Battle of the Falls. They returned to Malta in August 1970.

=== 1970s ===
In 1971 the battalion moved to Gordon Barracks in Gillingham, Kent. As an air-portable unit, elements of the Devon & Dorsets were frequently dispatched to various locations at short notice: In January 1972 they moved to County Armagh, to British Honduras in August 1972, to West Belfast in October 1973, to Cyprus in October 1974 and to Belize in November 1975.

In May 1976 the battalion rejoined the 12th Mechanised Brigade in Osnabrück. They did two tours of duty in Northern Ireland: in North Belfast from January to May 1977 and in Central Belfast from January to May 1979.

=== 1980s and 1990s ===
In April 1980 the battalion moved to Colchester. From July to November 1981 they did another tour in County Armagh under Operation Banner, and in 1982 took part in training exercises in Kenya.

In March 1983 the Devon & Dorsets became a resident battalion at Abercorn Barracks in Ballykinler in Northern Ireland as part of the 39th Infantry Brigade, remaining there until 1985. In 1985 they joined the Berlin Brigade, remaining in the city until 1987.

From February 1987 the battalion formed part of 1st Brigade at Bulford. Elements of the regiment were sent to the Falkland Islands and Belize in 1987 and 1988. From April to August 1989 they did another tour of duty in County Armagh. The Regimental Band were sent to the Persian Gulf between October 1990 and March 1991 as part of Operation Granby to serve in a field hospital. In August 1991 the battalion returned to Germany and was based in Werl and Paderborn. In 1993 they had another tour of duty in West Belfast. In 1994 they moved to Paderborn as part of the 20th Armoured Brigade.

=== Bosnia 1995 ===
In May 1995 the battalion formed part of the United Nations Protection Force intervening in the Bosnian War. Corporal Simon Harvey was awarded the Military Cross for twice extracting his Warrior tracked armoured vehicle from enemy fire on the Mount Igman route into Sarajevo. For part of the campaign they served alongside the French 2e Régiment Étranger d'Infanterie as part of United Nations Task Force Alpha, and a bond of friendship was later established between the two units.

=== 1995–2005 ===
The battalion returned to Paderborn in November 1995 and was based there until 1998. Parts of the unit spent time in Fermanagh between December 1996 and June 1997. In March 1998 they moved to Warminster where they assumed responsibility for teaching infantry tactics at the Combined Arms Tactics Centre Battle Group. They moved to the Cavalry Barracks, Hounslow in 2000. After intensive training, the battalion performed public duties in London and Windsor which included providing the Queen's Guard at Buckingham Palace during the September 11 attacks and in 2002 attending the state funeral of Queen Elizabeth the Queen Mother.

The Devon and Dorsets was again the resident battalion at Ballykinler from 2002 to 2004. In 2004 the battalion moved to Catterick Garrison.

=== Conversion to light infantry ===
In 2003 a defence white paper, Delivering Security in a Changing World, was published. Among the changes proposed was the amalgamation of all single-battalion infantry regiments into multi-battalion large regiments. As a result, discussions were undertaken between The Light Infantry and the Devonshire and Dorset Regiment concerning the formation of a three-battalion regiment. In December 2004 details of the amalgamations to be carried out were announced. The Devonshire and Dorset Regiment would integrate Gloucestershire elements of the Royal Gloucestershire, Berkshire and Wiltshire Regiment to form a new battalion of The Light Infantry. As part of the preparation for this, the regiment moved from the Prince of Wales' Division to the Light Division, and was renamed the Devonshire and Dorset Light Infantry, on 22 July 2005.

=== Amalgamation ===
On 24 November 2005, the Ministry of Defence announced further changes to the amalgamations. The regiment were now to join a new large regiment created by the amalgamation of the Devonshire and Dorset Regiment, The Light Infantry, the Royal Gloucestershire, Berkshire and Wiltshire Regiment, and the Royal Green Jackets. This new regiment was to be called The Rifles and was to be formed in February 2007. In the lead-up to the formation of The Rifles, officers and men of all four regiments were cross posted, but 1st Battalion, The Rifles was formed from the regular battalions of the Devonshire and Dorset Regiment and the Royal Gloucestershire, Berkshire and Wiltshire Regiment. On becoming part of a rifle regiment, the Devon and Dorsets no longer carried their colours; these were laid up in Exeter Cathedral on 27 January 2007.

== Regimental museum ==
The Devonshire and Dorset regimental collections are displayed in the Keep Military Museum, Dorchester.

== Colonels-in-Chief ==
Colonels-in-Chief of the regiment were:

- 1958–1968: Princess Marina, Duchess of Kent, CI, GCVO, GBE
- 1977–2007: F.M. Prince Edward, Duke of Kent, KG, GCMG, GCVO, ADC

== Regimental Colonels ==
Colonels of the regiment were:

- 1958–1962: Maj-Gen. George Neville Wood, CB, CBE, DSO, MC
- 1962–1967: Maj-Gen. Hugh Alastair Borradaile, CB, DSO
- 1967–1977: Brig. Alexander Edward Craven Bredin, DSO, MC
- 1977–1979: Gen. Sir Arthur John Archer, KCB, OBE
- 1979–1984: Col. Michael Frederick Robert Bullock, OBE, DL
- 1984–1990: Maj-Gen. Colin Terry Shortis, CB, CBE
- 1990–1998: Gen. Sir John Finlay Willasey Wilsey, GCB, CBE, ADC
- 1998–2002: Maj-Gen. Bryan Hawkins Dutton, CB, CBE
- 2002–2007: Lt-Gen. Sir Cedric Norman George Delves, KBE, DSO
- 2007: Regiment amalgamated with the Royal Gloucestershire, Berkshire and Wiltshire Light Infantry, The Light Infantry and the Royal Green Jackets to form The Rifles.

== Alliances ==
- Canada – Les Fusiliers de Sherbrooke
- Australia – The Royal New South Wales Regiment
- Malaysia – 6th Battalion, Royal Malay Regiment
- South Africa – 5 South African Infantry Battalion (Bond of Friendship)
- Royal Navy – HMS Exeter
- France – 2e Régiment Étranger d'Infanterie (Bond of Friendship)
