= List of British Regular Army regiments (1962) =

This is a list of British Regular Army regiments after the Army restructuring caused by the 1957 Defence White Paper. The paper set out the reduction in size of the Army to 165,000 following the end of National Service and the change to an entirely voluntary army; units were to be disbanded or amalgamated over two phases, to be completed in 1959 and 1962.

Further cuts and amalgamations followed in the 1960s and early 1970s.

== Cavalry ==
=== Household Cavalry ===
- The Life Guards
- Royal Horse Guards (The Blues) (Note: The Royal Horse Guards (The Blues) and 1st The Royal Dragoons amalgamated in 1969 to form the Blues and Royals (Royal Horse Guards and 1st Dragoons))

=== Royal Armoured Corps ===
==== Heavy Cavalry ====
- 1st The Queen's Dragoon Guards (Note: Formed by the amalgamation of 1st King's Dragoon Guards and The Queen's Bays (2nd Dragoon Guards) in 1959)
- 3rd Carabiniers (Prince of Wales's Dragoon Guards) (Note: The 3rd Carabiniers (Prince of Wales's Dragoon Guards) and The Royal Scots Greys (2nd Dragoons) amalgamated in 1971 to form the Royal Scots Dragoon Guards (Carabiniers and Greys))
- 4th/7th Royal Dragoon Guards
- 5th Royal Inniskilling Dragoon Guards

==== Light cavalry ====
- 1st The Royal Dragoons
- The Royal Scots Greys (2nd Dragoons)
- The Queen's Own Hussars (Note: Formed by the amalgamation of 3rd The King's Own Hussars and 7th Queen's Own Hussars in 1958)
- The Queen's Royal Irish Hussars (Note: Formed by the amalgamation of 4th Queen's Own Hussars and 8th King's Royal Irish Hussars in 1958)
- 9th/12th Royal Lancers (Prince of Wales's) (Note: formed by the amalgamation of 9th Queen's Royal Lancers and 12th Royal Lancers (Prince of Wales's) in 1960)
- 10th Royal Hussars (Prince of Wales's Own) (Note: The 10th Royal Hussars (Prince of Wales's Own) and 11th Hussars (Prince Albert's Own) amalgamated in 1969 to form the Royal Hussars (Prince of Wales's Own))
- 11th Hussars (Prince Albert's Own)
- 13th/18th Royal Hussars (Queen Mary's Own)
- 14th/20th King's Hussars
- 15th/19th The King's Royal Hussars
- 16th/5th The Queen's Royal Lancers
- 17th/21st Lancers

==== The Royal Tank Regiment ====
- 1st Royal Tank Regiment
- 2nd Royal Tank Regiment
- 3rd Royal Tank Regiment (Note: The 6th Royal Tank Regiment amalgamated with 3RTR in 1958)
- 4th Royal Tank Regiment (Note: The 7th Royal Tank Regiment amalgamated with 4RTR in 1958)
- 5th Royal Tank Regiment (Note: The 8th Royal Tank Regiment amalgamated with 5RTR in 1958)

== Combat Arms ==
- Royal Regiment of Artillery
- Corps of Royal Engineers (Note: The Transport and Movement Coastal Service of the RE formed part of the Royal Corps of Transport in 1965)
- Royal Corps of Signals
- Army Air Corps

== Infantry ==
The infantry in 1962 was divided into 15 separate brigades for administrative purposes: (Note: In 1968 the administrative brigades were merged to form 6 administrative divisions. These were: Guards Division — formerly the Brigade of Guards.; Scottish Division — formed by the amalgamation of the Highland and Lowland Brigades.; King's Division — formed by the amalgamation of the Lancastrian, North Irish, and Yorkshire Brigades.; Prince of Wales's Division — formed by the amalgamation of the Mercian, Welsh, and Wessex Brigades.; Queen's Division — formed by the amalgamation of the East Anglian, Fusilier and Home Counties Brigades.; Light Division — formed by the amalgamation of the Light Infantry and Green Jackets Brigades.)

- Guards Brigade: Grenadier Guards, Coldstream Guards, Scots Guards, Irish Guards, Welsh Guards.
- Lowland Brigade: The Royal Scots, King's Own Scottish Borderers, Cameronians (Scottish Rifles) and Royal Highland Fusiliers.
- Highland Brigade: The Black Watch, Gordon Highlanders, Argyll and Sutherland Highlanders and Queen's Own Highlanders.
- Home Counties Brigade: The Royal Sussex Regiment, Middlesex Regiment, Queen's Royal Surrey Regiment and Queen's Own Buffs.
- Fusilier Brigade: Royal Northumberland Fusiliers, Royal Fusiliers (City of London Regt) and Lancashire Fusiliers.
- East Anglian Brigade: 1st, 2nd and 3rd East Anglian Regiments
- Forester Brigade: Royal Warwickshire Regiment (until November 1962), Royal Leicestershire Regiment, Sherwood Foresters.
- Mercian Brigade: Cheshire Regiment, Worcestershire Regiment, Staffordshire Regiment.
- Welsh Brigade: Royal Welsh Fusiliers, South Wales Borderers, Welsh Regiment.
- Wessex Brigade: Gloucestershire Regiment, Royal Hampshire Regiment, Devonshire and Dorset Regiment, Duke of Edinburgh's Royal Regiment.
- Lancastrian Brigade: The Loyal Regiment (North Lancashire), King's Own Royal Border Regiment, King's Regiment and Lancashire Regiment (Prince of Wales's Volunteers).
- Yorkshire Brigade: The Green Howards, Duke of Wellington's Regiment, Prince of Wales's Own Regiment of Yorkshire and York & Lancaster Regiment.
- North Irish Brigade: Royal Inniskilling Fusiliers, Royal Irish Fusiliers, Royal Ulster Rifles.
- Light Infantry Brigade: King's Own Yorkshire Light Infantry, King's Shropshire Light Infantry, Durham Light Infantry, Somerset and Cornwall Light Infantry.
- Green Jackets Brigade: 1st Green Jackets (43rd and 52nd), 2nd Green Jackets (King's Royal Rifle Corps), 3rd Green Jackets (Rifle Brigade).

=== Foot Guards ===
- Grenadier Guards
- Coldstream Guards
- Scots Guards
- Irish Guards
- Welsh Guards

=== Line Infantry and Rifles ===
- The Royal Scots (The Royal Regiment)
- The Queen's Royal Surrey Regiment (Note: The Queen's Royal Surrey Regiment, Queen's Own Buffs, The Royal Kent Regiment, Royal Sussex Regiment and Middlesex Regiment (Duke of Cambridge's Own) were amalgamated into the Queen's Regiment in 1966)
- The Queen's Own Buffs, The Royal Kent Regiment
- The King's Own Royal Border Regiment
- The Royal Northumberland Fusiliers (Note: The Royal Northumberland Fusiliers, Royal Warwickshire Fusiliers, Royal Fusiliers (City of London Regiment) and Lancashire Fusiliers were amalgamated into the Royal Regiment of Fusiliers in 1968.)
- The Royal Warwickshire Regiment (Note: Renamed Royal Warwickshire Fusiliers in 1963)
- The Royal Fusiliers (City of London Regiment)
- The King's Regiment (Manchester and Liverpool)
- 1st East Anglian Regiment (Royal Norfolk and Suffolk) (Note: 1st East Anglian Regiment (Royal Norfolk and Suffolk), 2nd East Anglian Regiment (Duchess of Gloucester's Own Lincoln and Northamptonshire), 3rd East Anglian Regiment (16th/44th Foot) and Royal Leicestershire Regiment were amalgamated into the Royal Anglian Regiment in 1964)
- 2nd East Anglian Regiment (Duchess of Gloucester's Own Lincoln and Northamptonshire)
- The Devonshire and Dorset Regiment
- The Somerset and Cornwall Light Infantry (Note: The Somerset and Cornwall Light Infantry, King's Own Yorkshire Light Infantry, King's Shropshire Light Infantry and Durham Light Infantry were amalgamated into The Light Infantry in 1968)
- The Prince of Wales's Own Regiment of Yorkshire
- 3rd East Anglian Regiment (16th/44th Foot)
- The Royal Leicestershire Regiment
- The Green Howards (Alexandra, Princess of Wales's Own Yorkshire Regiment)
- The Lancashire Fusiliers
- The Royal Highland Fusiliers (Princess Margaret's Own Glasgow and Ayrshire Regiment)
- The Cheshire Regiment
- The Royal Welch Fusiliers
- The South Wales Borderers (Note: The South Wales Borderers and Welch Regiment were amalgamated into the Royal Regiment of Wales in 1969)
- The King's Own Scottish Borderers
- The Cameronians (Scottish Rifles) (Note: The Cameronians (Scottish Rifles) and the York and Lancaster Regiment were disbanded in 1968)
- The Royal Inniskilling Fusiliers (Note: The Royal Inniskilling Fusiliers, Royal Ulster Rifles and Royal Irish Fusiliers (Princess Victoria's) were amalgamated into the Royal Irish Rangers (27th (Inniskilling), 83rd and 87th) in 1968)
- The Gloucestershire Regiment
- The Worcestershire Regiment (Note: The Worcestershire Regiment and the Sherwood Foresters (Nottinghamshire and Derbyshire Regiment) were amalgamated into the Worcestershire and Sherwood Foresters Regiment (29th/45th Foot) in 1970)
- The Lancashire Regiment (Prince of Wales's Volunteers) (Note: The Lancashire Regiment (Prince of Wales's Volunteers) and the Loyal Regiment (North Lancashire) were amalgamated into the Queen's Lancashire Regiment in 1970)
- The Duke of Wellington's Regiment (West Riding)
- The Royal Sussex Regiment
- The Royal Hampshire Regiment
- The Staffordshire Regiment (The Prince of Wales's)
- The Welch Regiment
- The Black Watch (Royal Highland Regiment)
- 1st Green Jackets (43rd and 52nd) (Note: 1st Green Jackets (43rd and 52nd), 2nd Green Jackets, The King's Royal Rifle Corps and 3rd Green Jackets, The Rifle Brigade were amalgamated into the Royal Green Jackets in 1966)
- The Sherwood Foresters (Nottinghamshire and Derbyshire Regiment)
- The Loyal Regiment (North Lancashire)
- The Duke of Edinburgh's Royal Regiment (Berkshire and Wiltshire)
- The King's Own Yorkshire Light Infantry
- The King's Shropshire Light Infantry
- The Middlesex Regiment (Duke of Cambridge's Own)
- 2nd Green Jackets, The King's Royal Rifle Corps
- The York and Lancaster Regiment
- The Durham Light Infantry
- The Queen's Own Highlanders (Seaforth and Camerons)
- The Gordon Highlanders
- The Royal Ulster Rifles
- The Royal Irish Fusiliers (Princess Victoria's)
- The Argyll and Sutherland Highlanders (Princess Louise's)
- The Parachute Regiment
- 2nd King Edward VII's Own Gurkha Rifles (The Sirmoor Rifles)
- 6th Queen Elizabeth's Own Gurkha Rifles
- 7th Duke of Edinburgh's Own Gurkha Rifles
- 10th Princess Mary's Own Gurkha Rifles
- 3rd Green Jackets, The Rifle Brigade
- 22nd Special Air Service Regiment
- Royal Malta Artillery

== Services ==
- Royal Army Chaplains' Department
- Royal Army Service Corps (Note: Formed part of the Royal Corps of Transport in 1965)
- Royal Army Medical Corps
- Royal Army Ordnance Corps
- Corps of Royal Electrical and Mechanical Engineers
- Corps of Royal Military Police
- Royal Army Pay Corps
- Royal Army Veterinary Corps
- Small Arms School Corps
- Military Provost Staff Corps
- Royal Army Educational Corps
- Royal Army Dental Corps
- Royal Pioneer Corps
- Intelligence Corps
- Army Physical Training Corps
- Army Catering Corps
- General Service Corps
- Queen Alexandra's Royal Army Nursing Corps
- Women's Royal Army Corps
