= 1957 Defence White Paper =

Influential British armed forces report

The 1957 White Paper on Defence (Cmnd. 124) was a British white paper issued in March 1957 setting forth the perceived future of the British military. Duncan Sandys, the recently appointed Minister of Defence, produced the paper. It had profound effects on all aspects of the defence industry but probably the most affected was the British aircraft industry. The decisions were influenced by two major factors: the finances of the country and the coming of the missile age.

In the past, combat in the air would have been between high flying aircraft, bombers carrying nuclear weapons and interceptor fighter aircraft trying to stop them. Now the ballistic missile could deliver these weapons with no possible defensive response. In this new environment, the interceptors and surface-to-air missiles (SAMs), along with their associated radar networks, seemed superfluous. Likewise, it appeared new manned aircraft of any sort would have little utility in airspace dominated by SAMs. Numerous ongoing projects were abandoned, leaving too little work for the large number of aircraft companies. The paper suggested that the companies join forces to rationalize their operations for a future in which there would be smaller numbers of military projects.

At the time, the Army had a strong presence in Germany as a counter to Warsaw Pact forces. The paper noted that its ultimate goal was not to stop the Pact forces, but to act as a tripwire force to deter any attack as it would result in a larger British response – the actual battle was assumed to be carried out by nuclear weapons. The size of the Army was far larger than it had to be for this role, and led to reductions in the Army's size.

Only the Royal Navy was left significantly unchanged. The paper noted its important role in smaller engagements like the Korean War, and refocussed it on force projection rather than all-out battle with a Soviet fleet. The paper noted that the outcome of a continental nuclear war was not entirely obvious, and that continued fighting would give time for the large Soviet conventional submarine fleet to sortie. The paper suggested the Navy improve its anti-submarine capabilities and its ability to work in concert with other NATO forces.

== Main aspects of paper ==
=== The role of missiles ===
UK war plans of the 1950s were based on a "three-day war", in which the Warsaw Pact's forces would begin with a conventional attack in Europe, but the war would quickly progress to the use of tactical nuclear weapons. NATO's overwhelming air superiority would win the resulting battle. From that point, if the war continued, strategic weapons would be unleashed and the battle would be between the strategic bombers and the opposing defences. The massive superiority of the western air forces meant this battle would be short and largely one-sided, but the UK would have to survive at least one wave of Soviet attacks.

To handle this attack, in the post-World War II era the Royal Air Force deployed the ROTOR radar network that covered the entire British Isles in order to attack any strategic bomber that might attempt to approach. The defensive weapons of the system included new jet-powered interceptor aircraft and, originally, reorganised anti-aircraft artillery with new tactical control radars. By the early 1950s, the increasing speeds and altitudes of bombers meant they could "toss" their weapons from ranges outside even the largest anti-aircraft artillery, and plans began to replace these weapons with surface-to-air missiles.

By the mid-1950s, the USSR was known to be developing a variety of ballistic missiles able to deliver nuclear warheads. Split into classes based on their range, much of the attention internationally was on the longest-ranged intercontinental ballistic missiles (ICBMs). However, short-range missiles were both less expensive and easier to develop, and these had the performance needed to deliver a warhead to the UK from bases in East Germany. There was no defence from these medium range ballistic missiles and it appeared they would be widespread by the mid-1960s.

The introduction of strategic missiles seriously disrupted the UK's defensive posture. Planners of an anti-ballistic missile system code-named Violet Friend concluded no effective defence against these weapons was possible. The only way to stop an attack would be to stop it from being launched, and the only way to do that was through deterrence. Although the survival of the V force was required even before this point, there was some expectation that it would survive direct air attack given the ROTOR defence. With missiles, there was no way to do this. Any sign of an attack would require the immediate launch of the V force to ensure its survival - even if attacking bombers were detected, they would undoubtedly be accompanied by missiles. In this case, there was no point trying to defend their airfields - they would either be empty or the war was already lost.

In such a scenario, the need for air defences was essentially eliminated. If an attack occurred, even the complete attrition of attacking bombers would have little to no effect on the ultimate outcome once the missiles arrived. Much more likely was the opposite scenario, a missile attack on the V-force with Soviet bombers arriving later to ensure hits on targets that would likely have already been destroyed. With no existing system for detecting missile launches at long range, this became the primary concern.

As a result, the White Paper cancelled many defensive systems, like the Blue Envoy SAM and Saunders-Roe SR.177 interceptor, and significantly reduced the scope and mission of the Linesman/Mediator radar network that was being planned to replace ROTOR. To provide an indication of such a missile attack, the UK arranged to have a US BMEWS radar sited in England. Linesman was now tasked mostly with intercepting aircraft carrying carcinotron jammers, which the Soviets might use to mask BMEWS.

=== Reduction in manned aircraft projects ===
With the development of missiles, those roles that missiles could cover meant that certain aircraft in development could be cancelled.

These included the next generation of supersonic interceptor for high flying bombers, the F.155 and the interim aircraft that would have covered it until its introduction in 1963, namely the Saunders-Roe SR.53 and Saunders-Roe SR.177. Sandys felt that the existing interceptor fleet would serve until the Bristol Bloodhound was in service, and after that point, a bomber attack was unlikely as the world increasingly switched to missiles. As such, even the Blue Envoy surface-to-air missile was also cancelled; although it offered much higher performance than Bloodhound, by the time it arrived in the mid-1960s it would have nothing to shoot at.

The RAF was especially critical of one part of Sandys' conclusions. They noted the introduction of the Tupolev Tu-22 and Myasishchev M-50 supersonic bombers would occur before Bloodhound was fully deployed, and that their existing interceptor aircraft like the Gloster Javelin were incapable of successfully attacking these aircraft. Sandys relented and allowed the English Electric P.1 (which would become the Lightning) to continue development, along with a new air-to-air missile to arm it, the Hawker Siddeley Red Top.

The Avro 730 supersonic light bomber was also cancelled, as was the Blue Rosette nuclear weapon to arm it.

The Royal Auxiliary Air Force's flying role was also brought to an end.

=== Aircraft industry reorganisation ===
The paper stated that the aircraft industry should re-organise, with a number of smaller companies becoming a few larger ones. It was made clear that new contracts would only be given to such merged firms, including the only new aircraft project, which would become the TSR-2.

Under pressure, in 1960 English Electric, Bristol Aeroplane Company and Vickers-Armstrong merged to form the British Aircraft Corporation, or BAC. Hunting Aircraft soon joined the BAC group. In the same year, de Havilland, Blackburn Aircraft and Folland merged into Hawker Siddeley, which had already consisted of Armstrong Whitworth, Avro, Gloster and Hawker since 1935. Westland Aircraft took over all the helicopter manufacturers, including Saunders-Roe, Fairey Aviation and Bristol's helicopter work. Saunders-Roe's hovercraft work was spun off and merged with Vickers Supermarine as the British Hovercraft Corporation.

Very few companies were left independent after this wave of mergers, leaving only Handley Page as a major independent, along with the smaller companies like Auster, Boulton Paul, Miles Aircraft, Scottish Aviation and Short Brothers. Most of these disappeared by the 1970s, having merged into the British Aerospace conglomerate. Scottish Aviation remained independent until 1977 and Shorts was purchased by Bombardier in 1989.

Engine companies were likewise "encouraged" to merge. In 1959 Armstrong Siddeley and Bristol's engine division merged to become Bristol Siddeley, but were shortly purchased by Rolls-Royce in 1966, leaving RR as the only major British aircraft engine manufacturer.

=== Restructuring of the British Army ===
The British Army was to be reduced in size and reorganised to reflect the ending of National Service and the change to a voluntary army, and to "keep the Army abreast of changing circumstances, policies, weapons and techniques of war". 51 major units and a large number of smaller ones were to be disbanded or amalgamated, leaving the army with a strength of 165,000 officers and men. The process was to be carried out in two phases, to be completed by the end of 1959 and 1962 respectively.

The Royal Armoured Corps was to be reduced by the amalgamation of:

- 1st King's Dragoon Guards and the Queen's Bays (2nd Dragoon Guards) as 1st The Queen's Dragoon Guards
- 3rd The King's Own Hussars and 7th Queen's Own Hussars as Queen's Own Hussars
- 4th Queen's Own Hussars and 8th King's Royal Irish Hussars as Queen's Royal Irish Hussars
- 3rd Royal Tank Regiment and 6th Royal Tank Regiment amalgamated as 3rd RTR
- 4th Royal Tank Regiment and 7th Royal Tank Regiment amalgamated as 4th RTR
- 5th Royal Tank Regiment and 8th Royal Tank Regiment amalgamated as 5th RTR

==== Infantry changes ====
The infantry of the line was to undergo major changes. Existing regiments were to be grouped in "brigades". Each brigade was to have a single depot with those of the individual regiments being reduced to the status of regimental headquarters. There was to be a reduction in the number of regular infantry battalions from 64 to 49 by the merging of pairs of regiments. The brigades and regiments were to be (with changes to 1966):

- Brigade of Guards with HQ at Caterham Barracks.
  - Grenadier Guards—Reduced from 3 to 2 battalions, 3rd being placed in Permanent S/A (Suspended animation), and reduced to No.3 (Inkerman) Company in 2nd Btn.
  - Coldstream Guards—Reduced from 3 to 2 battalions, 3rd being placed in P S/As
  - G Squadron, 22nd Special Air Service Regiment—Squadron formed and placed under the Brigade of Guards
- Lowland Brigade with HQ at Glencorse Barracks
  - The Royal Scots—Merger of 7th/9th (Highlanders) Btn and 8th TA battalions to become 8th/9th Btn
  - Royal Scots Fusiliers & The City of Glasgow Regiment (Highland Light Infantry) amalgamated to form Princess Margaret's Own (Royal Highland Fusiliers) Glasgow and Ayrshire Regiment—all TA battalions of formers brought under command with original titles.
  - The King's Own Scottish Borderers—merger of 4th and 5th TA Btns, to become 4th/5th Battalion
- Home Counties Brigade with HQ at Howe Barracks
  - The Queen's Royal West Surrey Regiment and The East Surrey Regiment amalgamated into The Queen's Royal Surrey Regiment—5th and 6th (Bermondsey) Btns of The Queen's Royal West Surrey Regiment transferred with former titles, and merged with 23rd London Regiment and 6th Btn The East Surrey Regiment to form 3rd and 4th battalions in 1961.
  - The Queen's Own (Royal Kent Regiment) Buffs—formed by amalgamation of the Royal East Kent Regiment (Buffs) and The Queen's Own Royal West Kent Regiment, all TA battalions of formers brought under command with original titles.
  - The Duke of Cambridge's Own Middlesex Regiment—8th and new 5th Btns formed.
- Lancastrian Brigade with HQ at Fulwood Barracks, moving to Formby in 1960.
  - The King's Liverpool Regiment and The Manchester Regiment amalgamated to form The King's Manchester and Liverpool Regiment—all TA battalions of the former regiments brought under command with former titles
  - The East Lancashire Regiment and The Prince of Wales's South Lancashire Volunteers amalgamated to form The Prince of Wales's Lancashire Volunteers—all TA battalions of the former regiments brought under command with former titles
  - The King's Own Royal Lancaster Regiment and The Border Regiment amalgamated to form The King's Own Royal Border Regiment—all TA battalions of the former regiments brought under command with former titles but amalgamated into single 4th/5th Btn in 1961
- Yorkshire and Northumberland Brigade, renamed to Yorkshire Brigade upon formation of Fusilier Brigade in 1958 with HQ at Imphal Barracks moving to Strensall Camp in 1960
  - Alexandra, Princess of Wales's Own (North) Yorkshire Regiment (The Green Howards)—2nd Battalion disbanded, 4th and 5th Btns amalgamated to form 4th/5th (Yorkshire Volunteers) Btn
  - The Duke of Wellington's West Riding Regiment—5th Btn reformed and subsequently amalgamated with 7th to form 5th/7th Btn, West Riding Btn formed in 1961 from 5th/7th
  - The Prince of Wales's Own West Yorkshire Regiment and The Duke of York's Own East Yorkshire Regiment amalgamated to form The Prince of Wales's Own Regiment of Yorkshire—all TA battalions of the former regiments brought under command with former titles, 5th (WY) and 4th (EY) merged to form 3rd Btn in 1960, 7th Btn re-titled as Leeds Rifles 1961
- Midland Brigade, renamed as Forester Brigade in 1958 with HQ at Budbrooke Barracks, brigade broken up in 1963
  - The Royal Warwickshire Regiment—no changes, renamed as Royal Warwickshire Fusiliers in 1963 and year before moved to Fusilier Brigade
  - The Royal Leicestershire Regiment—4th btn formed cadre and subsequently merged with 5th Btn to form 4th/5th in 1961 in 1961, transferred to East Anglian Brigade in 1963
  - The Nottinghamshire and Derbyshire Regiment (The Sherwood Foresters)—5th and 8th battalions merged in 1961 to form 5th/8th Btn
- East Anglian Brigade with HQ at Gibraltar Barracks, all regular battalions merged into The Royal Anglian Regiment (1st—4th Btns) in 1964 (changes below shown FROM 1959)
  - The Royal Norfolk Regiment and The Suffolk Regiment merged into 1st (Royal Norfolk and Suffolk) East Anglian Regiment—all TA transferred under former titles, Suffolk Regiment (Territorial Army) merged with Cambridgeshire Regiment to form The Suffolk and Cambridgeshire Regiment 1961, all TA transferred to corps of Royal Anglian Regiment in 1964
  - Royal Lincolnshire Regiment and Northamptonshire Regiment amalgamated to form 2nd (Duchess of Gloucester's Own Royal Lincolnshire and Northamptonshire) East Anglian Regiment—all TA transferred under former titles all TA transferred to the corps of Royal Anglian Regiment in 1964
  - The Bedfordshire and Hertfordshire Regiment and Essex Regiment amalgamated to form 3rd (Bedfordshire, Hertfordshire, and Essex) East Anglian Regiment—all TA transferred under former titles, 5th (Bed) and 1st (Hert) merged to form The Bedfordshire and Hertfordshire Regiment (Territorial Army) 1961, all TA transferred to the corps of Royal Anglian Regiment in 1964
- Wessex Brigade with HQ at Wyvern Barracks
  - The Royal Hampshire Regiment—4th Btn disbanded
  - Devonshire Regiment and Dorset Regiment amalgamated to form The Devonshire and Dorset Regiment—TA units renamed as former regiments: The Devonshire Regiment (1st Rifle Volunteers) and The Dorset Regiment (Territorial Army)
  - Princess Charlotte of Wales's Royal Berkshire Regiment and The Duke of Edinburgh's Wiltshire Regiment amalgamated to form The Duke of Edinburgh's Royal Berkshire and Wiltshire Regiment—TA units transferred under former titles
- Light Infantry Brigade with HQ at Strensall Camp
  - Prince Albert's Somerset Light Infantry and The Duke of Cornwall's Light Infantry amalgamated to form The Somerset and Cornwall Light Infantry—TA transferred and took titles of former regulars: The Somerset Light Infantry (Prince Albert's) (Territorial Army) and The Duke of Cornwall's Light Infantry (Territorial Army)
- Mercian Brigade with HQ at Whittington Barracks
  - The South Staffordshire Regiment and The Prince of Wales's North Staffordshire Regiment amalgamated to form The Prince of Wales's Staffordshire Regiment—5th (NS) disbanded 1961 and merged with cadre of 5th Btn to form 5th/6th Btn 1961
- Welsh Brigade with HQ at The Barracks, Brecon moving to Cwrt y Gollen in 1960
  - The Royal Welch Fusiliers—2nd Btn disbanded, 6th and 7th Btns merged to form 6th/7th Btn
  - The Welsh Regiment—6th Btn reformed
- North Irish Brigade with HQ at St Lucia Barracks, moving 1960 to Thiepval Barracks, 1962: Ebrington Barracks, and 1966: St Patrick's Barracks
  - The Royal Inniskilling Fusiliers—2nd Btn disbanded
- Highland Brigade with HQ at Gordon Barracks
  - The Duke of Albany's Seaforth Highlanders (Ross-shire Buffs) and The Queen's Own Cameron Highlanders amalgamated to form The Queen's Own Seaforth and Cameron Highlanders—TA units transferred without change of titles
  - Gordon Highlanders—4th/7th and 5th/6th Btns merged to form 3rd Btn 1961
- Green Jackets Brigade with HQ at Peninsula Barracks
  - The Oxfordshire and Buckinghamshire Light Infantry renamed as 1st (Oxfordshire and Buckinghamshire) Green Jackets—4th Btn disbanded and concurrently renamed as The Oxfordshire and Buckinghamshire Light Infantry (Territorial Army)
  - The King's Royal Rifle Corps renamed as 2nd (King's Royal Rifle Corps) Green Jackets—2nd Btn disbanded, Queen Victoria's Rifles and Queen's Westminsters amalgamated to form Queen's Royal Rifles 1961 as TA affiliated unit
  - Prince Consort's Own Rifle Brigade renamed as 3rd (The Rifle Brigade) Green Jackets—London Rifle Brigade and The Rangers amalgamated to form London Rifle Brigade/Rangers 1960, and City of London Yeomanry (Rough Riders) moved under command 1956, moving out 1961
- Fusilier Brigade with HQ at St George's Barracks moving to Tower of London 1960 and back in 1966
  - The City of London Regiment (Royal Fusiliers)—8th Btn renamed as The City of London Battalion 1961
  - The Lancashire Fusiliers—2nd Btn disbanded

==== Royal Artillery changes ====
The Royal Artillery saw many changes, mostly in the way of AA units. When AA command was disbanded in 1955, many of the regular AA units were not disbanded like their Territorial counterparts, but disbanded in 1958/62.

- Royal Horse Artillery
  - 2nd Field Regiment transferred to Royal Artillery as 2nd Field Rgt
  - 4th Field Regiment disbanded 1961, batteries transferred to 7th Parachute Rgt RHA, reformed in Royal Artillery as 4th Regiment Royal Artillery
  - 5th Field Regiment transferred to Royal Artillery as 5th Regiment Royal Artillery
  - 7th Parachute Regiment formed 1961 from 4th RHA and 31st RA
- Royal Artillery
  - 2nd Field Regiment formed from 2nd RHA
  - 5th Field Regiment formed from 5th RHA
  - 10th Anti-Tank Regiment disbanded, personnel transferred to 5th RA 1958
  - 15th Medium Regiment disbanded, personnel to 21st Medium Rgt 1958
  - 23rd Field Regiment placed in suspended animation, personnel to 32nd Medium and 42nd Field Rgts 1958
  - 31st (Driver) Training Regiment placed in suspended animation 1961
  - 33rd Parachute Light Regiment disbanded to form 7th Parachute Rgt RHA 1961
  - 41st Field Regiment placed in suspended animation, personnel to 49th Field 1961
  - 47th (Field) Guided Weapons Regiment reformed 1957
  - 48th Field Regiment placed in suspended animation 1959, disbanded 1962
  - 51st Coast Regiment disbanded 1958
  - 52nd Locating Regiment placed in suspended animation 1958, disbanded 1962
  - 58th Medium Regiment disbanded 1959
  - 61st Field Regiment disbanded 1959, personnel to 45th Regiment
  - 64th Training Regiment disbanded 1962
  - 67th Selection Regiment disbanded 1957
  - 68th Selection Regiment placed in suspended animation 1961, disbanded 1962
- Anti-Aircraft Command (Anti-Aircraft Command or AA Command was disbanded in 1955, but most regular AA units were disbanded in 1957 or 1958)
  - 21st Heavy Anti-Aircraft Regiment placed in suspended animation 1964
  - 30th Heavy Anti-Aircraft Regiment placed in suspended animation, 1958 personnel to 24th and Junior Leaders Rgts
  - 35th Light Anti-Aircraft Regiment disbanded 1958
  - 38th (Signallers and Technical Anti-Aircraft) Training Regiment placed in suspended animation 1960, personnel to Junior Leaders and 31st Training Regiments
  - 43rd Light Anti-Aircraft Regiment placed in suspended animation 1959
  - 44th Heavy Anti-Aircraft Regiment placed in suspended animation, personnel to 32nd Medium Rgt 1958
  - 46th Heavy Anti-Aircraft Regiment placed in suspended animation 1958
  - 53rd Light Anti-Aircraft Regiment disbanded 1957
  - 54th Heavy Anti-Aircraft Regiment suspended animation in 1958, disbanded 1962
  - 55th Royal Artillery Training Regiment suspended animation in 1958, disbanded 1962
  - 56th Heavy Anti-Aircraft Regiment suspended animation 1958
  - 57th Heavy Anti-Aircraft Regiment suspended animation in 1960
  - 72nd Light Anti-Aircraft Regiment disbanded 1958
  - 74th Heavy Anti-Aircraft Regiment suspended animation 1958
  - 77th Heavy Anti-Aircraft Regiment suspended animation 1958
  - 80th Light Anti-Aircraft Regiment suspended animation 1958 disbanded 1962

The Royal Engineers would be reduced by approximately 15,000 officers and men, with divisional engineer regiments to be replaced by field squadrons. The Royal Signals was to lose 13,000 soldiers by reduction of second-line units. Some of the work of the Royal Army Service Corps was to pass to civilian contractors, allowing a loss of 18,000 men. The Royal Army Ordnance Corps was to lose 11,000 soldiers, and was to be organised more efficiently with a large number of depots closed. The Royal Electrical and Mechanical Engineers was to lose 23,000 soldiers. Other arms and services were to be reduced in proportion.

=== Ending of air branch RNVR ===
Since 1938 the Air Branch of the Royal Navy Volunteer Reserve had been contributing reservists for air operations. From 1947 it had been curtailed to anti-submarine warfare (ASW) and fighter units only — there being a large number of propeller aircraft still in use. The increasing complexity of weapons system and the use of helicopters for ASW was thought to be beyond what reservist training could manage. With the ending of the Air branch, the Short Seamew was no longer required and production was cancelled.
