= Invicta Park Barracks =

Barracks in Maidstone, England

- Maidstone
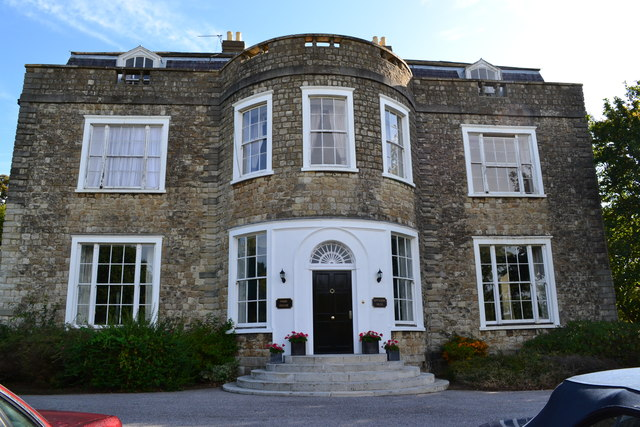
- Park House, currently used as the Officers' Mess

Site information
- Type: Barracks
- Owner: Ministry of Defence
- Operator: British Army

Location
- Location within Kent
- Coordinates: 51°17′22″N 00°31′23″E

Site history
- Built: 1936
- Built for: War Office
- In use: 1936-Present

Garrison information
- Occupants: 36 Engineer Regiment

Invicta Park Barracks is a military installation in Maidstone, Kent. It is set to close in 2029.

== History ==
=== Maidstone Barracks ===
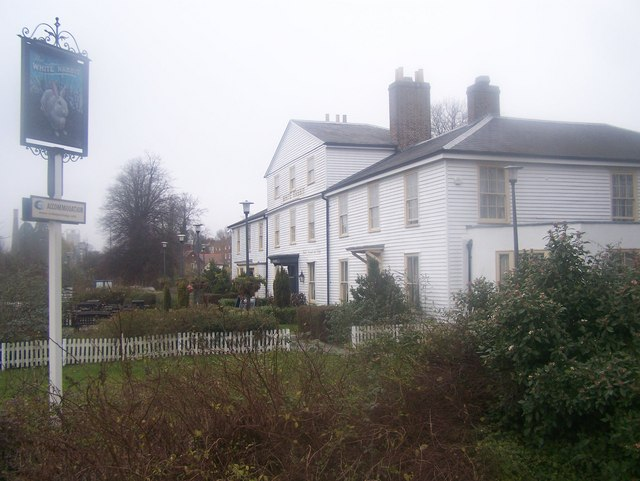
Maidstone Barracks: the surviving former officers' quarters (main block), flanked by commanding officer's rooms and the officers' mess.

Permanent barracks were first established in Maidstone as part of the British response to the threat of the French Revolution in 1797. Maidstone Barracks was a major cavalry barracks at a stationing point between London and the Kent coast (along which several more cavalry barracks were established in the 1790s). The barracks buildings were constructed of timber for speedy assembly, an approach taken at a number of other such establishments around the country hastily built (for both cavalry and infantry) at the start of the French Revolutionary Wars.

At the time of its establishment, Maidstone Barracks served as the British Army's Cavalry Depot (for inducting and training new recruits). In 1832, the Cavalry Riding Establishment moved there from St John's Wood. The Riding Establishment had been set up in the wake of the Napoleonic Wars to encourage best practice in equitation: standardised regulations were drawn up, and from 1834, all Riding Masters (responsible for training across the cavalry regiments) were sent on a course of instruction at Maidstone, to ensure that they were schooled in the official way of riding. From 1844, chosen NCOs from each regiment were also sent to Maidstone to be trained according to the prescribed regulations; this enabled them to assist the Riding Master and to serve as squadron Riding Instructors. In the 1860s, the Riding Establishment moved from Maidstone to Canterbury.

By the 1830s, Maidstone was serving as the home depot for all cavalry regiments stationed in India (each of which would leave behind three officers and forty-one other ranks who would be responsible for recruiting). In the 1850s, a second cavalry depot was established at Canterbury Barracks; the two operated in tandem until 1865, at which point the depot at Maidstone was abolished leaving Canterbury alone to serve as depot for the cavalry regiments.

In 1873, a system of recruiting areas based on counties was instituted under the Cardwell Reforms and the barracks became the depot for the 50th (West Kent) Regiment of Foot and the 97th (The Earl of Ulster's) Regiment of Foot. Following the Childers Reforms, the 50th and 97th regiments amalgamated to form the Queen's Own Royal West Kent Regiment with its depot in the barracks in 1881.

By 1936, the old barracks had begun to fall into disrepair, and the regiment began to move to nearby Invicta Park; nevertheless the old barracks were retained by the Army, continuing in use until the 1990s. Although the barracks blocks were demolished in 1991, the Officers’ Mess still survives as the White Rabbit Public House in Sandling Road. Apart from the brick chimneys and slate roof, the building is entirely made of wood, and is the last remaining example of a type of building designed by the Barrack Department in the 1790s to be erected in a hurry, as required to house troops of cavalry or regiments of infantry ready for deployment.

=== Invicta Park ===
An adjacent site, just a few hundred yards north, was acquired from the Lushington family in 1936 and shortly before the outset of the Second World War a hutted camp (later known as Invicta Lines, reflecting Invicta, the motto of Kent) was built there, initially for the training of militiamen. These new barracks became the regimental depot and headquarters of the Queen's Own Royal West Kent Regiment and it housed the regiment's Infantry Training Centre (13 I.T.C.) for the duration of the war. In 1946, the I.T.C. moved to Shorncliffe. While Maidstone continued as the headquarters of the regiment, only a skeleton staff remained on site (mainly to maintain the Officers' and Serjeants' Messes for occasional functions) until in 1950 the Regimental Depot system was re-established for infantry training. In 1959, however, the depot was demoted to the status of out-station to the new Home Counties Brigade depot at Howe Barracks in Canterbury. In June 1961, following the amalgamation of the regiment with The Buffs (Royal East Kent Regiment), the regimental depot and headquarters closed.

The Regimental Headquarters, 36 Engineer Regiment have been at Maidstone since 1959. They were initially based in the hutted camp at Invicta Lines, but between 1965 and 1966 it was demolished and the regiment moved into new barracks on the site, which was renamed Invicta Park. The regiment had also occupied the old Barracks since the 1960s, but these were vacated in 1994 when new working accommodation was provided on an expanded Invicta Park site.

== Based units ==
The following units are based at Invicta Park Barracks:

- Corps of Royal Engineers
  - 36 Engineer Regiment

== Future ==
In November 2016, the Ministry of Defence announced that the site would close in 2027, this was later extended to 2029.
