= St George's Barracks =

There are several St George's Barracks in the world.

- St George's Barracks, Bicester
- St George Barracks, Gosport
- St George's Barracks, London
- St George's Barracks, North Luffenham
- St George's Barracks, Sutton Coldfield
- St George's Barracks, Minden, Germany
