= Queen's Division =

- Active: 1968–present
- Country: United Kingdom
- Branch: British Army
- Type: Administrative Command

The Queen's Division is a British Army training and administrative apparatus for infantry regiments from the East & South of England, and Gibraltar.

== Formation ==
The Queen's Division was formed in 1968 with the regimentation of the Home Counties Brigade, Fusilier Brigade and East Anglian Brigade, followed by the union of the new regiments. The depot was established at Bassingbourn Barracks in Cambridgeshire.

== Cold War ==
During the Cold War, the Queen's Division saw a massive expansion. Below the list of units belonging to the division with disbandment dates or transfer dates where needed:

List of battalions of the Queen's Division during the Cold War
- Queen's Regiment (QUEENS)
  - Regimental Headquarters, Queen's Regiment, at Howe Barracks, Canterbury
  - 1st Battalion (Regulars) -> amalgamated with 2nd Btn to form 1 PWRR
  - 2nd Battalion (Regulars) -> amalgamated with 1st Btn to form 1 PWRR
  - 3rd Battalion (Regulars) -> amalgamated with 1 R HAMPS (Prince of Wales's Division) to form 2 PWRR
  - 4th Battalion (Regulars) -> disbanded in 1973
  - 5th (V) Battalion (Volunteers) -> redesignated as 5th (V) PWRR in 1992
  - 6th (V) Battalion (Volunteers) -> amalgamated with 7th (V) Bn in 1975 to form 6th/7th (V) Bn in 1975
  - 7th (V) Battalion (Volunteers) -> amalgamated with 7th (V) Bn in 1975 to form 6th/7th (V) Bn in 1975
  - 6th/7th (V) Battalion (Volunteers) -> redesignated as 6th/7th (V) PWRR in 1992
- Royal Regiment of Fusiliers (RRF)
  - Regimental Headquarters, Royal Regiment of Fusiliers, at the Tower of London
  - 1st Battalion (Regulars)
  - 2nd Battalion (Regulars)
  - 3rd Battalion (Regulars) -> disbanded in 1992
  - 4th Battalion (Regulars) -> disbanded in 1969
  - 5th (V) Battalion (Volunteers)
  - 6th (V) Battalion (Volunteers) -> formed in 1975
- Royal Anglian Regiment (R ANGLIAN)
  - Regimental Headquarters, Royal Anglian Regiment, at Gibraltar Barracks, Bury Saint Edmunds
  - 1st Battalion (Regulars)
  - 2nd Battalion (Regulars)
  - 3rd Battalion (Regulars) -> disbanded in 1992
  - 4th Battalion (Regulars) -> disbanded in 1975
  - 5th (V) Battalion (Volunteers)
  - 6th (V) Battalion (Volunteers) -> formed in 1971
  - 7th (V) Battalion (Volunteers) -> formed in 1971
- 8th (Volunteer) Battalion, The Queen's Fusiliers (City of London) (8 QF) -> formed in 1988 as hybrid TA unit between Queen's Regiment and Royal Regiment of Fusiliers

Following the reorganisation of the TA in 1999, the Queen's Division was reduced to just six regular battalions (two in each regiment) and just three TA battalions (one in each).

== Modern day ==
Because the Queen's Division already contained large regiments from the previous round of amalgamations in the 1960s, it was the only one of the five line infantry divisions to be unaffected by the restructuring announced in 2004.

- Princess of Wales's Royal Regiment (Queen's and Royal Hampshire) (PWRR)
- Royal Regiment of Fusiliers (RRF)
- Royal Anglian Regiment (R ANGLIAN)

However, in 2022 the infantry was reorganised, which saw two regiments from the north of England attached. The Queen's Division therefore now comprises the following infantry battalions:

- Regular Army Units
  - 1st Battalion, The Princess of Wales's Royal Regiment (Queen's and Royal Hampshire)
  - 1st Battalion, The Royal Regiment of Fusiliers
  - 1st Battalion, The Duke of Lancaster's Regiment (King's, Lancashire and Border)
  - 1st Battalion, The Mercian Regiment (Cheshire, Worcesters and Foresters, and Staffords)
  - 1st and 2nd Battalions, The Royal Anglian Regiment
  - 3rd Battalion The Rangers
  - Royal Gibraltar Regiment
- Army Reserve Units
  - 3rd Battalion, The Princess of Wales's Royal Regiment (Queen's and Royal Hampshire)
  - 4th Battalion, The Princess of Wales's Royal Regiment (Queen's and Royal Hampshire)
  - 5th Battalion, The Royal Regiment of Fusiliers
  - 4th Battalion, The Duke of Lancaster's Regiment (King's, Lancashire and Border)
  - 4th Battalion, The Mercian Regiment (Cheshire, Worcesters and Foresters, and Staffords)
  - 3rd Battalion, Royal Anglian Regiment

The current Colonel Commandant is Lieutenant General Douglas Chalmers.

== Bands ==
Before the formation of the Corps of Army Music in 1994, each battalion of the Queen's Division, except for the Royal Regiment of Fusiliers maintained a band. These included the following:

Regular Army

- Band of the 1st Battalion, Princess of Wales's Royal Regiment (formed by amalgamation of the 1 and 2 QUEENS bands)
- Band of the 2nd Battalion, Princess of Wales's Royal Regiment (formed by redesignation of R HAMPS band (Note: 3 QUEENS didn't have a band following reductions in 1984))
- Duke of Kent's Band of the Royal Regiment of Fusiliers
- Saint George's Band of the Royal Regiment of Fusiliers
- Band of the 1st Battalion, Royal Anglian Regiment
- Band of the 2nd Battalion, Royal Anglian Regiment
- Band of the 3rd Battalion, Royal Anglian Regiment

Army Reserve

- Kohima Band of the Princess of Wales's Royal Regiment – 3 PWRR (formed by redesignation of the Band of the Queen's Regiment – overseen by 5 QUEENS)
- Warwickshire Band of the Royal Regiment of Fusiliers – 5 RF
- Northumbria Band of the Royal Regiment of Fusiliers – 6 RF
- Band of the Royal Anglian Regiment – 5 R ANGLIAN

Following the reductions, all above bands were reduced to the Normandy Band of the Queen's Division (Bands of the RRF) and the Minden Band of the Queen's Division (Bands of the PWRR and R ANGLIANs).

Following reductions to the Corps of Army Music, the Band of the Queen's Division was formed through amalgamation of the two former bands in 2007, but later disbanded in 2018. CAMUS was reorganised in 2019 with the band reforming, itself now part of British Army Band Catterick.

In addition, since 1992 the Royal Gibraltar Regiment maintains a Band and Corps of Drums.

== Gallery ==
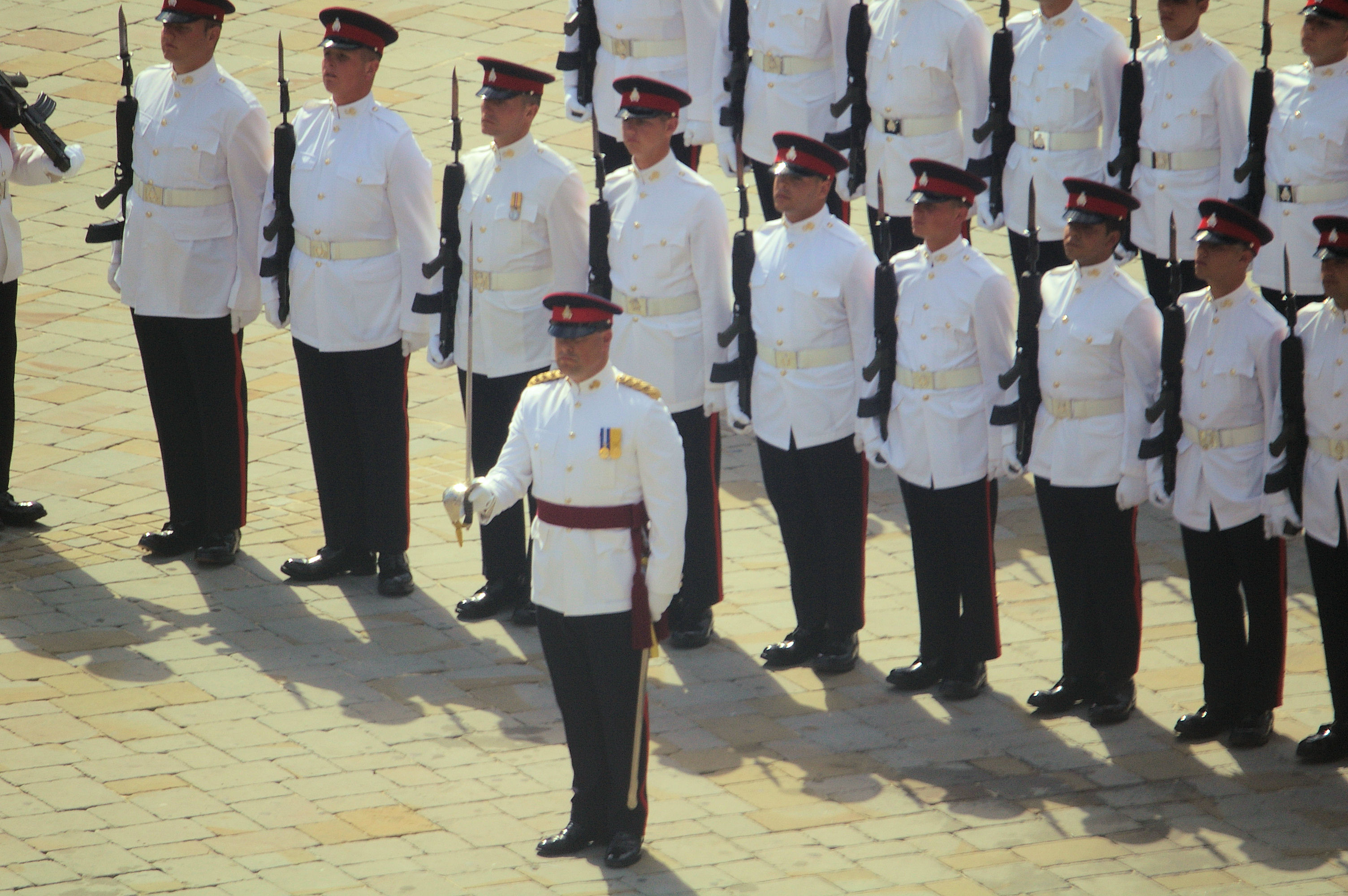
The Royal Gibraltar Regiment

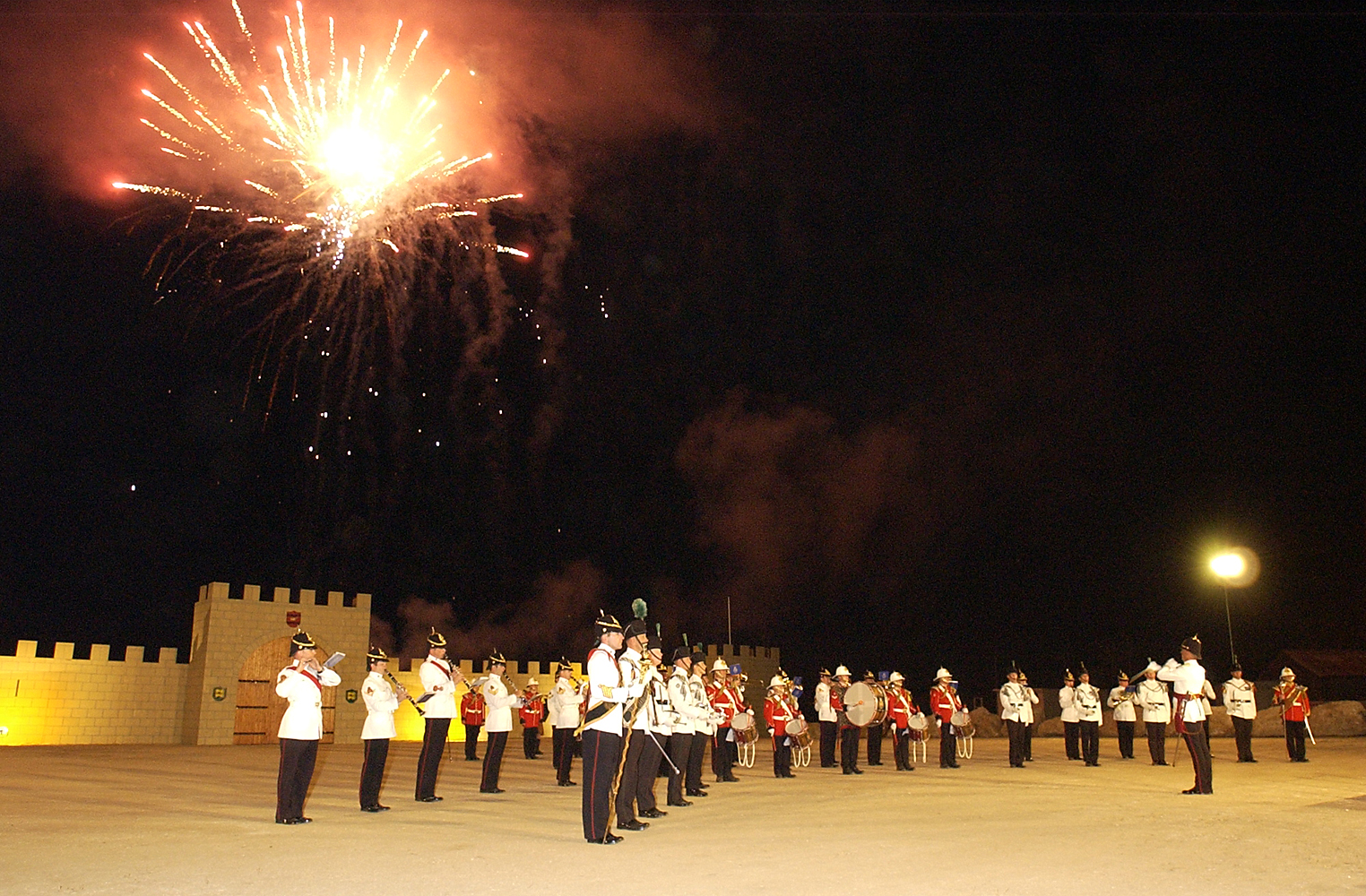
The Minden Band parading in Cyprus.

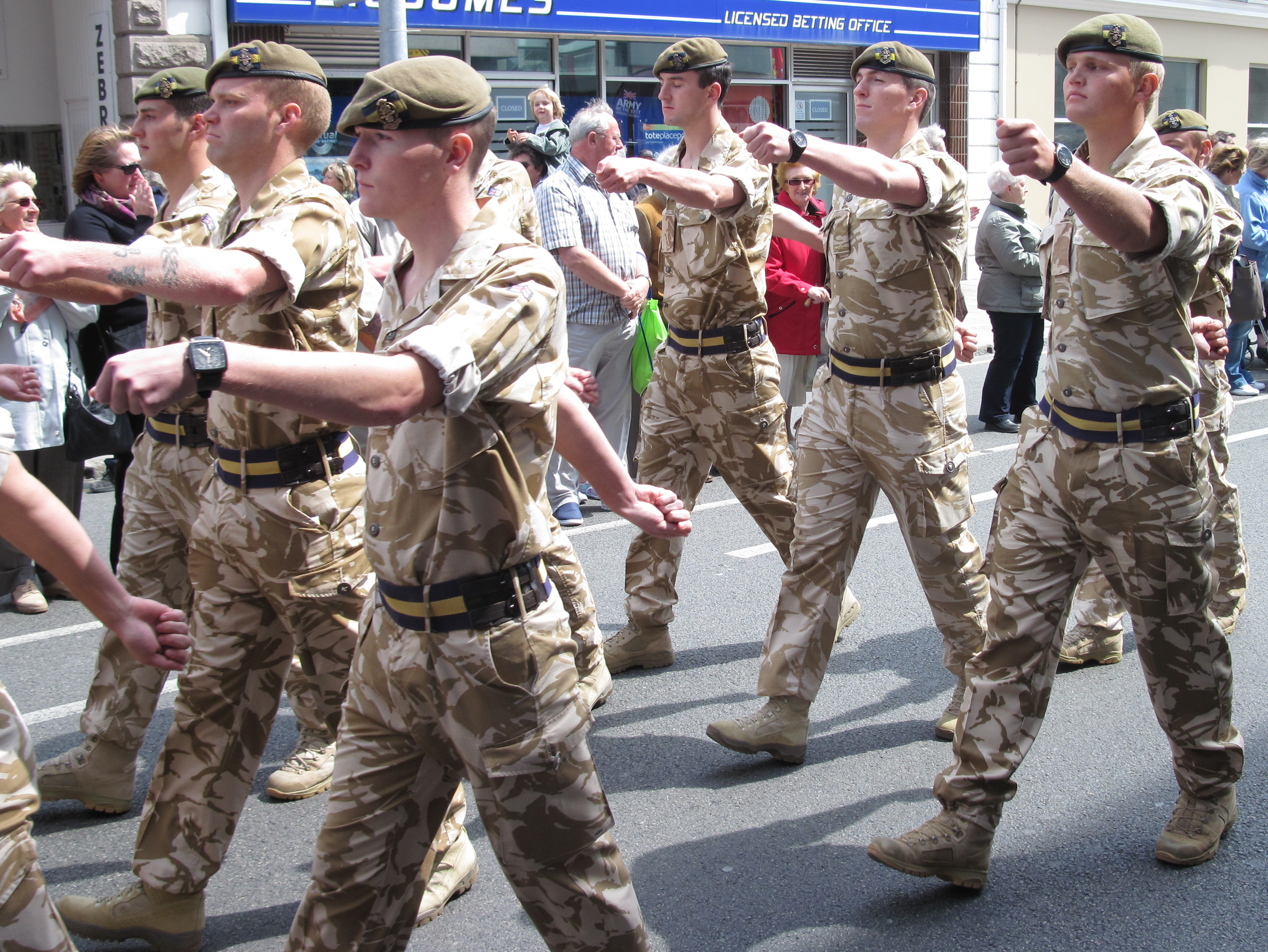
The Princess of Wales's Royal Regiment on parade

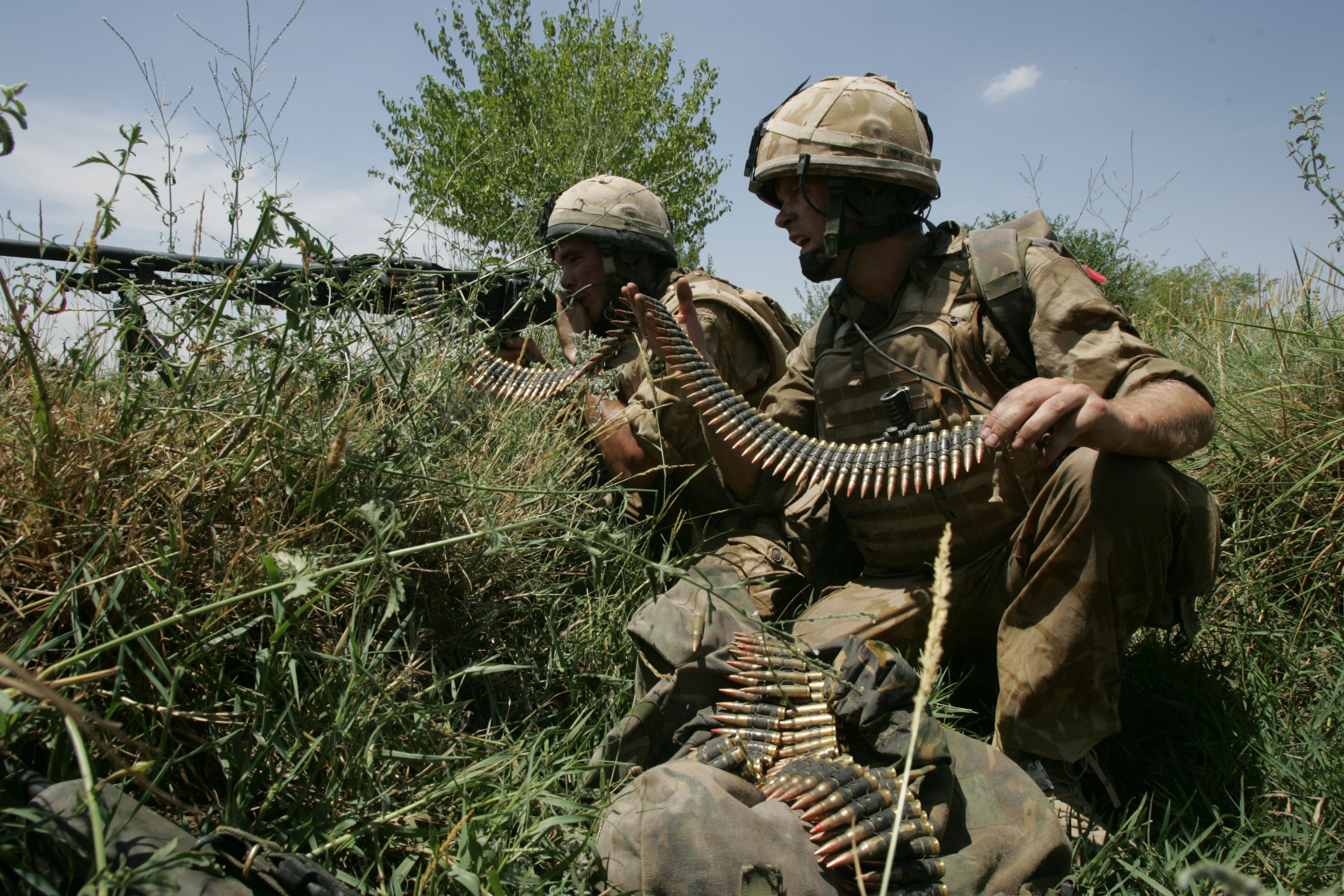
Soldiers of the Royal Anglian Regiment in Afghanistan

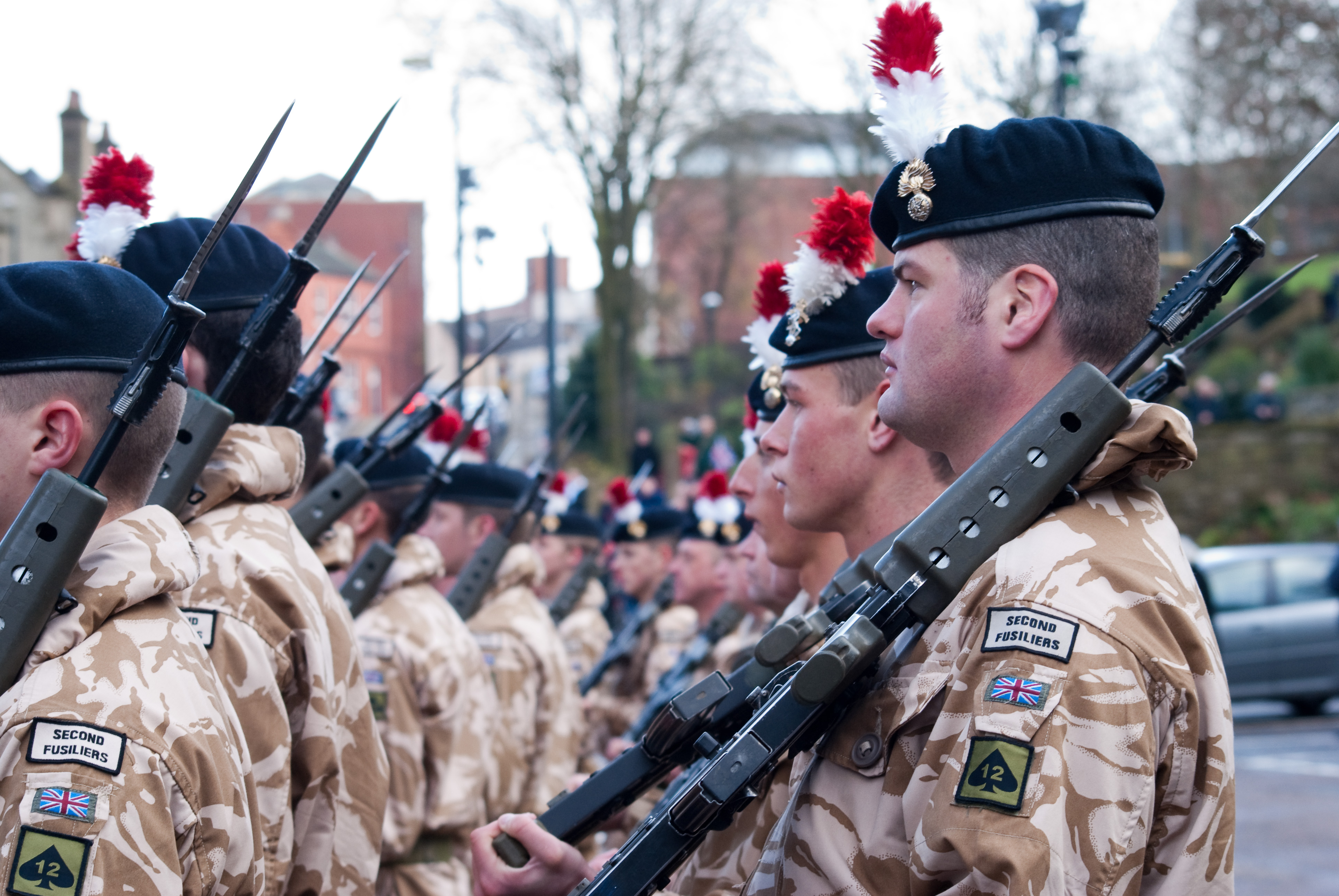
Soldiers of the Royal Regiment of Fusiliers

== Sources ==
- Staff Officer's Handbook for 1988. London, United Kingdom: Ministry of Defence. 1988.
- The Royal Regiment of Fusiliers (5th, 6th, 7th, 20th): The Regimental Handbook, Customs and Practices of The Regiment (PDF) (8th ed.). Tower of London, United Kingdom: Regimental Headquarters, Royal Regiment of Fusiliers. 2019.
- Heyman, Charles (2012). The British Army: A Pocket Guide, 2012–2013. Pen & Sword. ISBN 9781848841079.
