= Queen's Regiment =

- Badge and tie of the regiment
- Active: 31 December 1966 – 9 September 1992
- Country: United Kingdom
- Branch: British Army
- Type: Line Infantry
- Size: Largest at 10 battalions
- Part of: Queen's Division
- Regimental HQ: Howe Barracks, Canterbury
- Nickname: Reporting name: QUEENS
- Motto: "Unconquered I Serve"
- March: Quick – Soldiers of the Queen; Slow – The Caledonian
- Anniversaries: Sobraon (10 February), Albuhera (16 May), Glorious First of June, Sevastopol (8 September), Salerno (9 September), Quebec (13 September), British Battalion Day (20 December)

Commanders
- Colonel in Chief: HM Queen Margrethe II of Denmark

The Queen's Regiment (QUEENS) was an infantry regiment of the British Army formed in 1966 through the amalgamation of the four regiments of the Home Counties Brigade. Then, until 1971 the regiment remained one of the largest regiments in the army, with 10 battalions, however these were reduced to just six, and later five battalions. Following the dissolution of the Soviet Union, the Options for Change reform was published and the regiment amalgamated with the Royal Hampshire Regiment to form the Princess of Wales's Royal Regiment.

== Formation ==
The regiment was formed as a 'large regiment' on 31 December 1966 by the amalgamation of the four remaining regiments of the Home Counties Brigade as a consequence of the Defence Review of 1957. The four regiments formed four battalions, retaining their previous names in the titles. In addition, the former regiment's Territorial battalions transferred under their former titles to the corps of the regiment for a short time. Below is a list of the regiment's subordinate organisations with formation dates, predecessor and successors. Battalion subtitles were omitted on 1 July 1968.

Regulars

- Regimental Headquarters, at Howe Barracks, Canterbury
- 1st Battalion (Queen's Surreys) – amalgamated with 2nd Bn to form 1st Princess of Wales's Royal Regiment in 1992
- 2nd Battalion (Queen's Own Buffs) – amalgamated with 1st Bn to form 1st Princess of Wales's Royal Regiment in 1992
- 3rd Battalion (Royal Sussex) – amalgamated with Royal Hampshire Regiment to form 2nd Princess of Wales's Royal Regiment in 1992
- 4th Battalion (Middlesex) – disbanded in 1973

Territorials

- 6th (Territorial) Battalion (Queen's Surreys)
  - Formed in 1967, reduced to cadre sponsored by 5th (V) Bn while forming coy in same bn, disbanded in 1971 and subsequently formed 3 new coys in 5th, 7th, and 6th (V) Bns respectively
- 7th (Territorial) Battalion (East Kent)
  - Formed in 1967, reduced to cadre in 1969 in 5th (V) Bn while forming new coy in same bn, disbanded in 1971 and subsequently formed 3 new coys in 5th and 7th (V) Bns
- 8th (Territorial) Battalion (West Kent)
  - Formed in 1967, reduced to cadre in 1969 and formed new coy in 5th (V) Bn, disbanded in 1971 and subsequently formed a new coy in 7th (V) Bn
- 9th (Territorial) Battalion (Royal Sussex)
  - Formed in 1967, reduced to cadre in 1969 and formed new coy in 5th (V) Bn, disbanded in 1971 and subsequently formed two new coys and new Battalion HQ in 5th and 7th (V)
- 10th (Territorial) Battalion (Middlesex)
  - Formed in 1967, reduced to cadre in 1969 and formed new coy in 5th (V) Bn, disbanded in 1971 and subsequently formed two new coys in 5th and 6th (V) Bns

Volunteers – had NATO roles and post 1975 Home Defence roles in addition, separate from the above Territorial battalions

- 5th (Volunteer) Battalion – formed in 1967, transferred to PWRR as 5th (V) Bn in 1992
- 6th/7th (Volunteer) Battalion – formed in 1975, transferred to PWRR as 6th/7th (V) Bn in 1992
  - 6th (Volunteer) Battalion – formed in 1971 as new unit, amalgamated with 7th (V) Bn to form 6th/7th (V) Bn in 1975
  - 7th (Volunteer) Battalion – formed in 1971 as new unit, amalgamated with 6th (V) Bn to form 6th/7th (V) Bn in 1975
- 8th (Volunteer) Battalion, Queen's Fusiliers (City of London) – formed in 1988 as joint TA unit with Royal Regiment of Fusiliers, became London Regiment in 1993

== Operational deployments ==
The deployment of the regiment's battalions was primarily to Northern Ireland on Operation Banner during The Troubles, taking part in anti-terrorist operations. The 1st Battalion was almost continuously deployed there between August 1969 and November 1976. The Longest Stag, a recent publication, provides a very detailed account of The Queen's Regiment deployed to Northern Ireland over more than 30 years. In all, twenty-nine operational tours were served by the Regiment.

In 1968, the 2nd Battalion took over Palace Barracks, Belfast, Northern Ireland, from the 4th Battalion (Middlesex) who had been there since 1965. the battalion was engaged in Internal Security duties prior to and at the start of the official declaration of emergency in August 1969. In August 1969 the 1st Battalion were deployed to Derry. The 3rd Battalion were posted to Ballykinler, Northern Ireland in 1970. The 1st Battalion joined the Berlin Brigade in West Berlin, a small enclave in Communist-controlled East Germany. The 4th Battalion was disbanded that year, as with every other 'junior' battalion of the new large regiments.

The 2nd Battalion were deployed to East Belfast in 1971. The 3rd battalion remained in Ballykinler, until they moved to Tidworth in December that year. Both the 2nd and 3rd battalions were deployed on operations to Belfast and Derry, Northern Ireland in 1972 and were involved in Operation Motorman. The 3rd Battalion was posted to Cyprus as part of the United Nations Peacekeeping Force in Cyprus (UNIFICYP), a force intended to prevent conflict from breaking out between Greek and Turkish Cypriots: the battalion returned to the United Kingdom in May 1973. Also that year, the 3rd Battalion arrived in Gibraltar where it remained with the garrison for almost two years.

1st Battalion served in West Belfast between 1973 and 1974 and then again whilst on spearhead in May 1974 for the Ulster Workers Council Strike The 2nd Battalion was posted to Derry, Northern Ireland from Werl, West Germany. In 1975, 1st Battalion was posted to Werl, Germany (replacing the 2nd Battalion – who had moved from Werl back to Bulford Camp).

The 2nd Battalion, were deployed to Northern Ireland in 1976, first on a spearhead deployment in South Armagh following the Kingsmill (Bessbrook) massacre, followed by a 6-month tour in Belize. The 1st Battalion were again deployed to Derry. The 2nd Battalion were deployed to West Belfast, on an operational tour in Andersonstown in early 1977. The 2nd Battalion were then posted to Gibraltar.

The 3rd Battalion were posted to Belize from February to August 1977, then a British territory, as part of the garrison there to protect it from the perceived threat of war with Guatemala, a neighbour of Belize, which was making claims that it believed Belize to be an integral part of Guatemala. In 1978, 1st Battalion deployed on operations to West Belfast for five months from Werl. The 2nd Battalion were in Gibraltar and the 3rd Battalion in Dover. The 3rd Battalion deployed to Bessbrook, Northern Ireland in 1979.

The 1st Battalion moved to Canterbury (the regiment's home base) in 1980. From there it undertook a six-month tour of Belize. The 2nd Battalion deployed to Cyprus on a 6-month tour-of-duty with UN forces in 1981. The 1st Battalion were posted to Omagh in County Tyrone in 1982. It served there until January 1985 with south east Fermanagh as its primary focus. In 1983, the 2nd Battalion were posted to Derry, also on a two-year tour.

The 3rd Battalion were deployed to Belfast on a six-month tour from Fallingbostel in 1984. With all three battalions' in the province of Northern Ireland, A freedom parade was held in Belfast in 1984 at which all three battalions' Regimental Colours were paraded.

The 1st battalion moved to Gibraltar in 1985 for two years before returning to the United Kingdom (Tidworth) in 1987 where it was to remain until 1990. During this period it undertook two 6-month tours of Northern Ireland – South Armagh in 1987 and Belfast in 1989/90. In 1990 the battalion moved to Minden in Germany, where it disbanded in 1992.

The 3rd Battalion deployed to Belize from April to October 1986 on a 6-month tour-of-duty. Whilst there, a company group were on immediate standby to fly to the Turks and Caicos Islands in deterrence to the unrest in July 1986. On behalf of the Battalion the CO, Lt Col Bob McGhie was presented with the Wilkinson Sword for Peace prize for their efforts in Belize, by the Lord Lieutenant of Kent Mr Robin Leigh Pemberton. In 1987 the battalion was deployed to Northern Ireland as a Spearhead unit on Operation Cara Cara, reinforcing existing Units as an incremental Battalion deploying to fifteen base locations across the province with the mission to protect RUC Police stations. In 1988 they returned to Aldergrove, Northern Ireland for a 2-year operational tour. In 1990 the 3rd Battalion arrived in Cyprus—its last deployment abroad and the location of its disbandment in 1992. From Cyprus the Battalion also deployed a reinforced company group for 5 months to the Falkland Islands and South Georgia. The 2nd Battalion were deployed to Falkland Islands and South Georgia in 1985/1986 as part of the joint force garrison to deter an invasion from Argentina. 1988 The 2nd Battalion returned to West Belfast. In 1991 a reinforced infantry company group from the battalion returned to The Falkland Islands and South Georgia. The 2nd Battalion's last operational deployment was to Northern Ireland on Operation Gypsy in 1992 before heading to Canterbury, England where it disbanded later in the year.

== Amalgamation ==
As a consequence of the Options for Change defence cuts, on 9 September 1992 the regiment was amalgamated with the Royal Hampshire Regiment to form the Princess of Wales's Royal Regiment (Queen's and Royal Hampshires).

== Regimental museum ==
The Queen's & Princess of Wales's Royal Regiment Regimental Museum is at Dover Castle.

== Uniform ==
The Queen's regimental uniform consisted of a dark 'royal blue' uniform with blue facings, and scarlet piping. The regimental badge consisted of "A Dragon upon a mount within the Garter; above the Dragon and superimposed upon the Garter the Plume of the Prince of Wales".

== Regimental bands ==
The Queen's Regiment maintained three bands at the time of its disbandment; Band of the 1st Queen's Regiment, Band of the 2nd Queen's Regiment, and Kohima Band of the Queen's Regiment (5th (V) Bn). The first two being regular becoming the Band of the 1st Princess of Wales's Royal Regiment, and the Kohima Band being transferred to the same regiment.

== Regimental colours ==
The Queen's Regimental colours consisted of the following:

- Central Device: A Dragon upon a mount within the Garter, above the Dragon and superimposed on the Garter the Plume of the Prince of Wales
- 1st Corner: A Paschal Lamb upon an eight-pointed star ensigned with the Crown
- 2nd Corner: A White Horse rampant above a scroll inscribed 'Invicta', and The Cypher of Queen Catherine
- 3rd Corner: The Star of the Order of the Garter over the Roussillon Plume, and A Naval Crown superscribed '1st June 1794'
- 4th Corner: The Sphinx superscribed 'Egypt', and The Plume of the Prince of Wales above the Coronet and Cypher of the Duke of Cambridge.

== Colonels-in-Chief ==
Colonels-in-Chief were as follows:

- 1967–1992: HM Queen Juliana of the Netherlands LG
- 1967–1972: HM King Frederik IX of Denmark KG GCB GCVO GCStJ
- 1967–1968: Chief Commandant HRH The Princess Marina, Duchess of Kent CI GBE GCVO GCStJ
- 1972–1992: HM Queen Margrethe II of Denmark LG

== Regimental Colonels ==
Regimental Colonels were as follows:

- 1966–1973: Lt-Gen. Sir Richard Craddock, KBE, CB, DSO (from Queen's Own Buffs, The Royal Kent Regiment)
- 1973–1977: Maj-Gen. Fergus Alan Humphrey Ling, CB, CBE, DSO
- 1977–1984: Maj-Gen. Rowland Spencer Noel Mans, CBE
- 1984–1989: Brig. Herbert Charles Millman, OBE
- 1989–1992: Maj-Gen. Michael Frank Reynolds, CB

== Alliances ==
Alliances arranged were as follows:

- Canada The Queen's York Rangers (1st American Regiment) – Canada (1966–1992)
- Canada The South Alberta Light Horse—Canada (1966–1992)
- Canada The Queen's Own Rifles of Canada (1966–1992)
- Canada The Hastings and Prince Edward Regiment—Canada (1966–1992)
- Canada 1st Battalion, The Royal New Brunswick Regiment (Carleton and York) — Canada (1966–1992)
- Canada The Essex and Kent Scottish—Canada (1966–1992)
- Australia Royal New South Wales Regiment – Australia (1967–1992)
- Australia The Royal Western Australia Regiment (1967–1992)
- Australia University of New South Wales Regiment—Australia (1967–1992)
- New Zealand 2nd Battalion (Canterbury and Nelson-Marlborough, and West Coast), Royal New Zealand Infantry (1966–1992)
- New Zealand 5th Battalion (Wellington West Coast and Taranaki), Royal New Zealand Infantry (1966–1992)
- Pakistan 12th, 14th, 15th, and 17th Battalions, The Punjab Regiment – Pakistan
- Sierra Leone The Royal Sierra Leone Regiment, Royal Sierra Leone Military Forces (1966–?)
- Hong Kong The Royal Hong Kong Regiment (The Volunteers) – (1966–1992)

== Order of precedence ==
Preceded by Royal Scots	Infantry Order of Precedence	Succeeded by The King's Own Royal Border Regiment

== Lineage ==
Lineage
The Queen's Regiment	The Queen's Royal Surrey Regiment
The Queen's Regiment	The Queen's Own Buffs, The Royal Kent Regiment
The Queen's Regiment	The Royal Sussex Regiment
The Queen's Regiment	The Middlesex Regiment
