= Fusilier Brigade =

- Cap badge of the Fusilier Brigade now worn by the Royal Regiment of Fusiliers
- Active: 1958–1968
- Country: United Kingdom
- Branch: British Army
- Type: Brigade
- Garrison/HQ: St George's Barracks, Sutton Coldfield

Commanders
- Representative Colonel: Major-general Cosmo Nevill (1958–1963); Brigadier Percy Bamford (1963–1968)

The Fusilier Brigade was an administrative brigade of the British Army which existed from 1958 to 1968 and administered the infantry regiments titled as fusiliers.

== History ==
The Brigade was created as part of the 1957 Defence White Paper announced in July 1957. It was formed on 1 April 1958, when the three English fusilier regiments were transferred from existing regional brigades:

- The Royal Northumberland Fusiliers (from the Yorkshire and Northumberland Brigade)
- The Royal Fusiliers (City of London Regiment) (from the Home Counties Brigade)
- The Lancashire Fusiliers (from the Lancastrian Brigade)

The three regiments adopted common cap and collar badges consisting of a fired grenade bearing Saint George and the dragon within a laurel wreath beneath a crown. The grenade was a badge common to all fusilier regiments, while the other elements were each taken from the cap badges of the three regiments. The regiments were distinguished by a coloured feather hackle worn behind the badge in some forms of head dress: red and white (Royal Northumberland Fusiliers), white (Royal Fusiliers), or primrose yellow (Lancashire Fusiliers) respectively. From 1960 the Fusilier Brigade was based at St George's Barracks in Sutton Coldfield.

In 1962 the Forester Brigade was dissolved and the Royal Warwickshire Regiment was transferred to the Fusilier Brigade, being retitled the Royal Warwickshire Fusiliers in the following year, and adopting a hackle in the regimental colours of orange and royal blue. A new button was designed for the Brigade in 1963, bearing the ancient antelope badge of the Royal Warwickshires within The Garter.

On 23 April 1968, (St George's Day) all four regiments were amalgamated into the single "large regiment", the Royal Regiment of Fusiliers. The RRF continues to wear the Fusilier Brigade badges and buttons, with the red over white hackle of the Northumberland Fusiliers.

On 1 July 1968 the Fusilier Brigade was united with the Home Counties Brigade and East Anglian Brigades, to form the Queen's Division.

== Units ==
Throughout its existence, the brigade was made up of the following units:

=== Regular battalions ===
- 1st Battalion, Royal Northumberland Fusiliers (1958–1968)
- 1st Battalion, Royal Fusiliers (City of London Regiment) (1958–1968)
- 1st Battalion, Lancashire Fusiliers (1958–1968)
- 1st Battalion, Royal Warwickshire Fusiliers (1962–1968)

=== Territorial battalions ===
- 6th (City) Battalion, Royal Northumberland Fusiliers (1958–1967)
- 7th Battalion, Royal Northumberland Fusiliers (1958–1968)
- 4th/5th Battalion, Royal Northumberland Fusiliers (1958–1967)
- 4th/5th/6th Battalion, Royal Northumberland Fusiliers (1967–1968)
- 8th (1st City of London) Battalion, Royal Fusiliers (City of London Regiment) (1958–1961)
- The City of London Battalion, Royal Fusiliers (City of London Regiment) (1961–1967)
- 5th (Bury) Battalion, Lancashire Fusiliers (1958–1967)
- 7th Battalion, Royal Warwickshire Fusiliers (1962–1967)
