= Royal Regiment of Fusiliers =

Infantry regiment of the British Army

- The regimental cap badge
- Active: 23 April 1968 – present
- Allegiance: United Kingdom
- Branch: British Army
- Type: Line infantry
- Role: 1st Battalion (Armoured Infantry); 2nd Battalion (Armoured Infantry & Army Reserve)
- Size: Two battalions
- Part of: Queen's Division
- Garrison/HQ: RHQ – London; 1st Battalion – Tidworth; 5th Battalion – Newcastle upon Tyne
- Mottos: "Honi soit qui mal y pense" (French) "Shamed be who thinks evil of it"
- March: Quick – The British Grenadiers; Slow – Rule Britannia
- Mascots: Traditional – Black Buck – Bobby; Substitute – Otterhound – George
- Anniversaries: Middle East Day (28 February); St. George's Day (23 April); Gallipoli Day (25 April); Albuhera Day (16 May); Normandy Day (6 June); Northern Ireland Day (15 June); Minden Day (1 August); Afghanistan Day (4 October)

Commanders
- Colonel-in-Chief: Prince Edward, Duke of Kent

Insignia
- Tactical Recognition Flash
- Hackle: Red over White; From Royal Northumberland Fusiliers
- Abbreviation: FUSILIERS

The Royal Regiment of Fusiliers, often referred to as The Fusiliers, is an infantry regiment of the British Army, part of the Queen's Division. Currently, the regiment has two battalions: the 1st Battalion, part of the Regular Army, is an armoured infantry battalion based in Tidworth, Wiltshire, and the 5th Battalion, part of the Army Reserve, recruits in the traditional fusilier recruiting areas across England. The Royal Regiment of Fusiliers was largely unaffected by the infantry reforms that were announced in December 2004, but under the Army 2020 reduction in the size of the Army, the 2nd Battalion was merged into the first in 2014.

== History ==
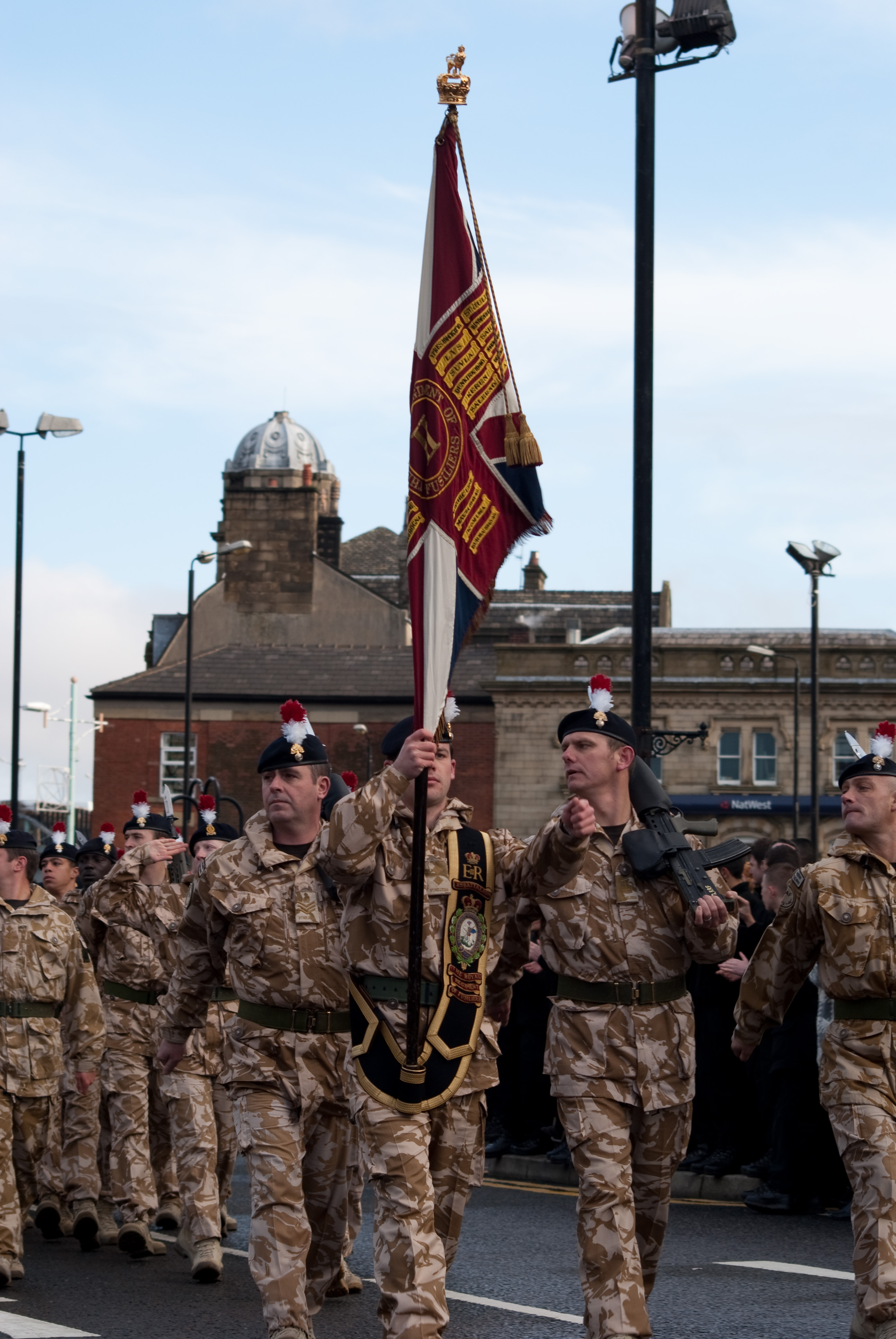
The Fusiliers march in Rochdale

The Royal Regiment of Fusiliers was formed on 23 April 1968 as part of the reforms of the British Army that saw the creation of 'large infantry regiments', by the amalgamation of the four English Fusilier regiments:

- Royal Northumberland Fusiliers
- Royal Warwickshire Fusiliers
- Royal Fusiliers (City of London Regiment)
- Lancashire Fusiliers

The 3rd Battalion of the regiment saw active service in Iraq during the Gulf War in 1991. All battalions were also deployed to Northern Ireland on Operation Banner multiple times.

In 2003, the 1 Fusiliers battlegroup was at the forefront of the coalition invasion of Iraq, ultimately occupying the city of Basra. Over the next decade, the regiment carried out multiple operational tours of Iraq.

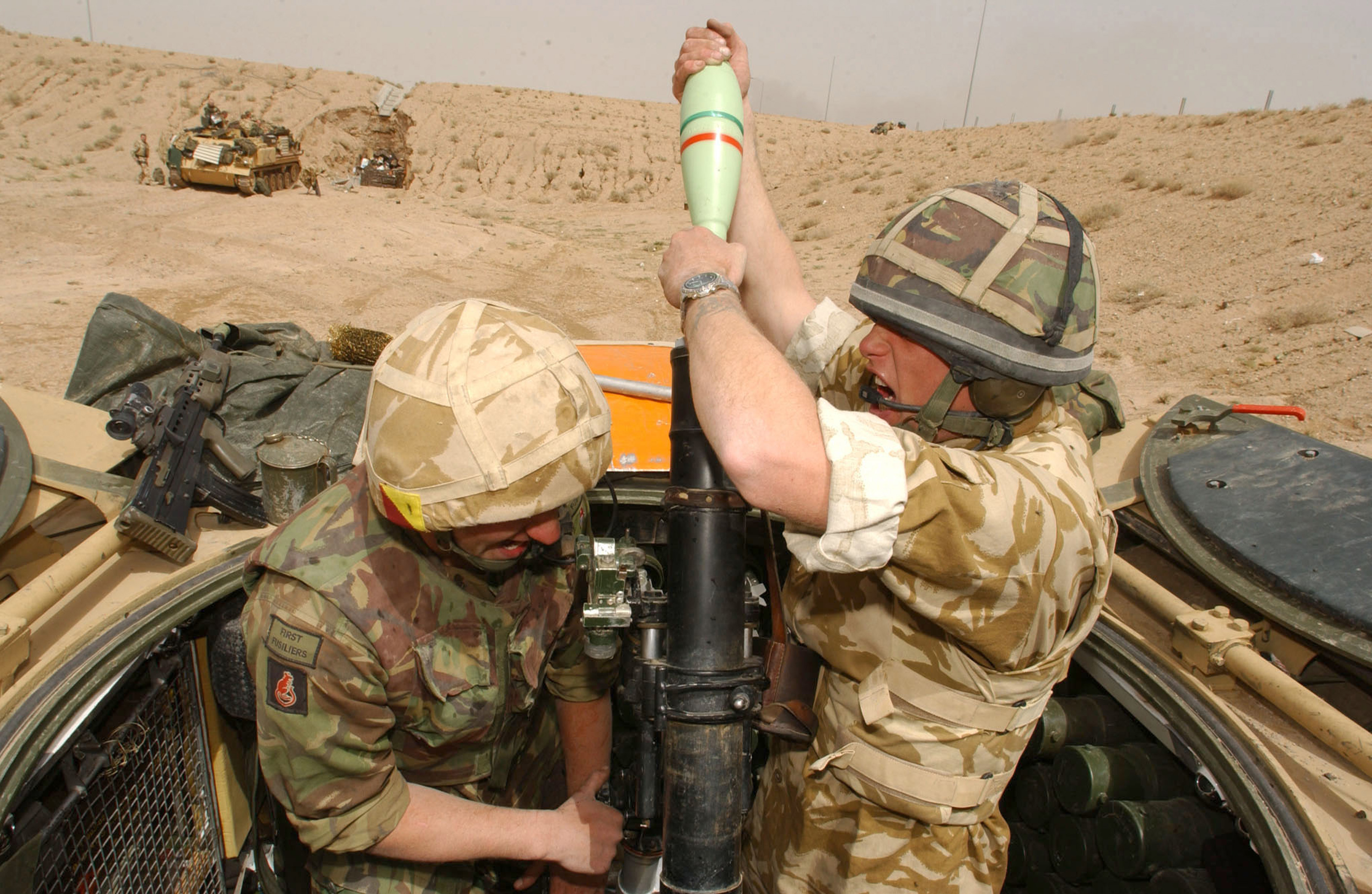
First Fusiliers Mortar team during the 2003 Invasion of Iraq

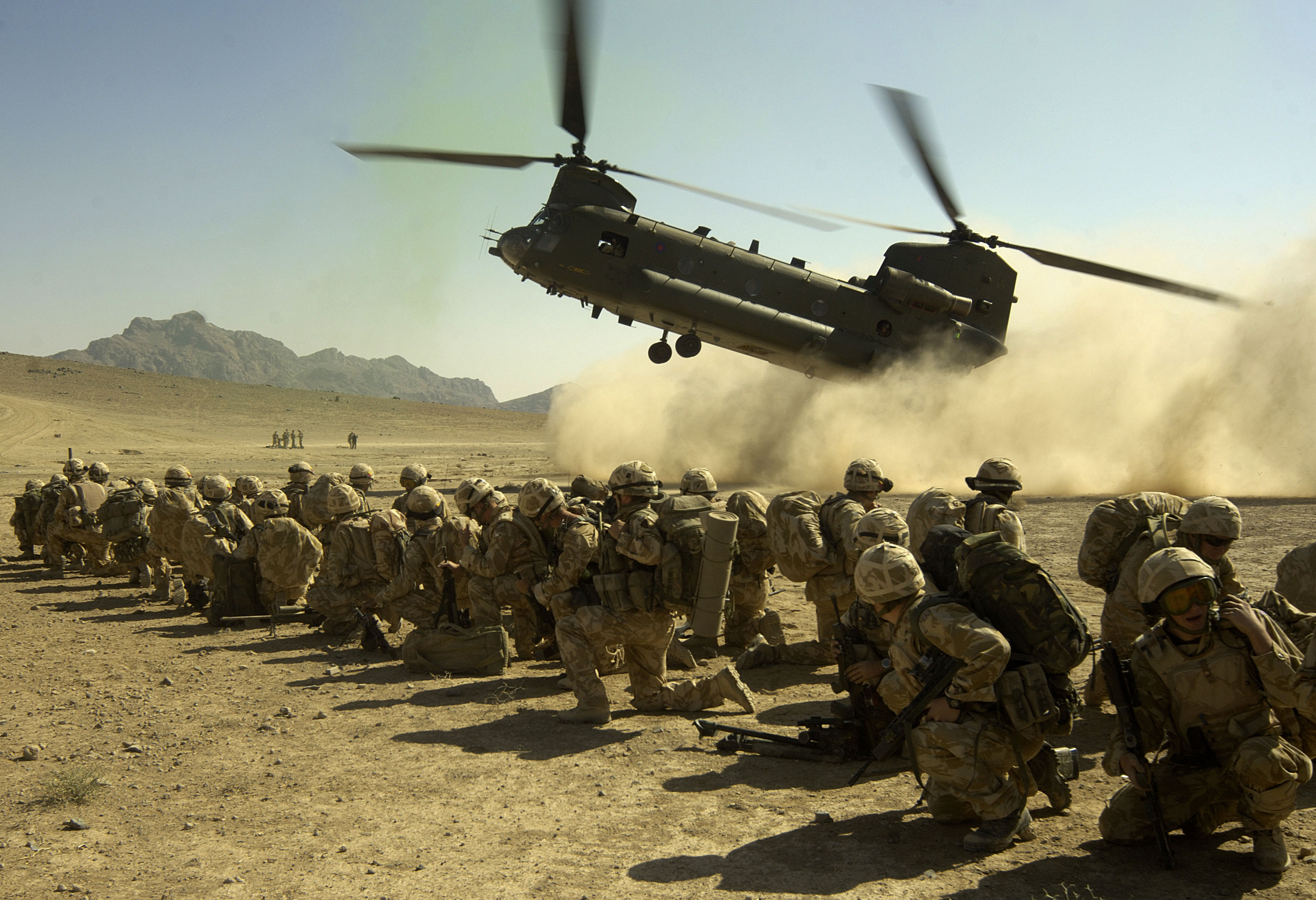
Second Fusiliers awaiting pick-up in Helmand Province in 2006

In 2006, elements of the 2nd Battalion were deployed to Afghanistan to support the International Security Assistance Force. Deployed to the town of Now Zad in Helmand Province, they rapidly found themselves fighting off a sustained Taliban attack that lasted for 107 days - the longest siege of British troops since World War II. Over the following years, elements of the regiment deployed on several occasions to Afghanistan and saw heavy fighting. Most recently, the entire 1st Battalion deployed to Nahri Saraj District in Helmand in 2013, where they took part in mounted and dismounted infantry operations.

The regiment received a reserve battalion, the 5th battalion, through the redesignation of the Tyne-Tees Regiment, on 1 April 2006.

In September 2014, the 2nd Battalion was amalgamated with the 1st Battalion under Army 2020, forming just one regular battalion - an armoured infantry battalion under 1st Armoured Infantry Brigade.

== Structure ==
=== Cold War ===
During the Cold War, the regiment saw a massive expansion, expanding from three regular battalions to six battalions in just a few years. Below is a list of those units raised within the regiment during the era:

Regulars

- Regimental Headquarters, Royal Regiment of Fusiliers, at the Tower of London
- 1st Battalion, Royal Regiment of Fusiliers (Regular)
- 2nd Battalion, Royal Regiment of Fusiliers (Regular)
- 3rd Battalion, Royal Regiment of Fusiliers (Regular) – disbanded following Options for Change in 1992
- 4th Battalion, Royal Regiment of Fusiliers (Regular) – disbanded one year after formation, in 1969

TAVR (all disbanded in 1967)

- 4th/5th Battalion, Royal Northumberland Fusiliers
- 4th/5th/6th Battalion, Royal Northumberland Fusiliers, disbanded in 1971
- 7th Battalion, Royal Northumberland Fusiliers
- 7th Battalion, Royal Warwickshire Fusiliers
- The City of London Battalion, Royal Fusiliers
- 5th (Bury) Battalion, Lancashire Fusiliers

Volunteers (from 1967)

- The Fusilier Volunteers, redesignated as 5th (V) Battalion, Royal Regiment of Fusiliers in 1968, redesignated again in 1992 following Options for Change as 5th (Warwickshire) Battalion, disbanded in 1999
- 6th (Volunteer) Battalion, Royal Regiment of Fusiliers, redesignated in 1992 following Options for Change as 6th (Northumberland) Battalion
- 8th (Volunteer) Battalion, The Queen's Fusiliers (City of London), formed in 1988 as joint TA unit with Queen's Regiment, headquarters at the TA Centre at St. John's Hill, Clapham Junction. On Transition To War, would have provided guards & security for 50 Missile Regiment Royal Artillery, equipped with the nuclear-tipped Lance. Redesignated as The London Regiment in 1993 following Options for Change.

Bands (with battalion assignment after, if needed)

- Duke of Kent's Band of the Royal Regiment of Fusiliers – amalgamated with St George's Band RRF to form Normandy Band of the Queen's Division following Options for Change in 1992
- Saint George's Band of the Royal Regiment of Fusiliers – amalgamated with Duke of Kent's Band RRF to form Normandy Band of the Queen's Division following Options for Change in 1992
- Warwickshire Band of the Royal Regiment of Fusiliers (5 RRF)
- Northumbria Band of the Royal Regiment of Fusiliers (6 RRF)

=== 1st Battalion ===
The 1st Battalion is an armoured infantry battalion based in Tidworth Camp, Wiltshire. Equipped with the Warrior IFV, the battalion is part of the army's 3rd Division and is held at high readiness as part of the army's armoured war-fighting reserve. In 2016, the battalion was the army's Lead Armoured Battlegroup and was held at extremely high readiness in case it was required to deploy anywhere in the world at short notice. The battalion is highly experienced with multiple deployments in the last two decades to Bosnia, Northern Ireland, Iraq and Afghanistan. Many soldiers from the 2nd Battalion joined the 1st Battalion on the merger, increasing the operational experience within the ranks. More recently, the 1st Battalion deployed around the world on exercise in places as diverse as Brunei, Kenya, the Baltic States and Canada.

The 1st Battalion also regularly works in support of the civil powers in the UK. In 2013, large elements of the battalion were deployed to Wraysbury and the surrounding area to support the flood relief efforts.

The battalion won the Army Boxing Championships in 2016, beating the 2nd Battalion of the Parachute Regiment in the final.

=== 5th Battalion ===
The 5th Battalion is a Reserve battalion with its headquarters in the northeast of England. As a battalion within the 3rd (United Kingdom) Division, the 5th Battalion specialises in armoured infantry operations and has deployed all over the world on operations and on exercise both as a formed unit and as individual augmentees to the 1st Battalion. The 5th Battalion is now paired with the 1st Battalion and continues to support them in operations and on exercise.

5th Battalion maintains subunits at the following locations:

- RHQ - Newcastle upon Tyne
- HQ Company - Anzio House, Newcastle
- A Company - Birmingham
- C (London) Company - Balham and Blackheath
- W (Gallipoli) Company - Bolton and Bury
- X Company - Newcastle upon Tyne and Hexham
- Z Company - Alnwick and Cramlington
- Anti-Tank Platoon - Blackheath
- Recce Platoon - Alnwick

== Hackle ==
As a Fusilier regiment, the Fusiliers wear a hackle – the red-over-white hackle of the Royal Northumberland Fusiliers. This distinction was originally a white plume which, according to regimental tradition, men of the 5th Regiment of Foot had taken from the headdress of fallen French troops at St. Lucia in December 1778. In 1829, King George IV ordered the white plume to be worn by all infantry regiments, and in order not to take away from the 5th (Northumberland) Regiment of Foot's peculiar distinction and reflecting the "gallantry of the exploits" it commemorated ' (according to legend the original plumes were stained red with the blood of their foes), their plume was differentiated by being made "half red and half white, the red uppermost, instead of the plain white feather worn by the rest of the army per the 1829 order, as a peculiar mark of honour."

== Victoria Crosses ==
The combined Victoria Crosses of the Fusiliers and its ancestor regiments total fifty five. Of particular note are the first and last Victoria Crosses of the First World War - won by Lt Dease and Pte Godley at Mons in 1914 and Sgt Pearse in North Russia in 1919 - and the famous "Six VCs Before Breakfast" won at Gallipoli on 25 April 1915.

== Mascot ==
The regiment's traditional mascot is an Indian Blackbuck Antelope called Bobby, inherited from the Royal Warwickshire Fusiliers. However, Indian Blackbuck Antelopes are now protected under animal welfare rules and the Regiment has not been allowed one for several years. As a substitute, the Regiment uses an Otterhound called George, who holds the rank of Fusilier and attends all the major parades in which the Regiment is involved.

== Roses ==
To mark certain Regimental Days, the Fusiliers wear roses in their headdress and bedeck the Battalion Colours with garlands. The tradition comes from their victory at the Battle of Minden, where, according to legend, soldiers marched at dawn to battle through rose fields and so went into action with the roses adorning their headdress. On St Georges Day, they wear red and white roses. On Minden Day, they wear red and yellow roses. New Fusilier Officers also must eat a rose at their first Minden Dinner on joining the Regiment.

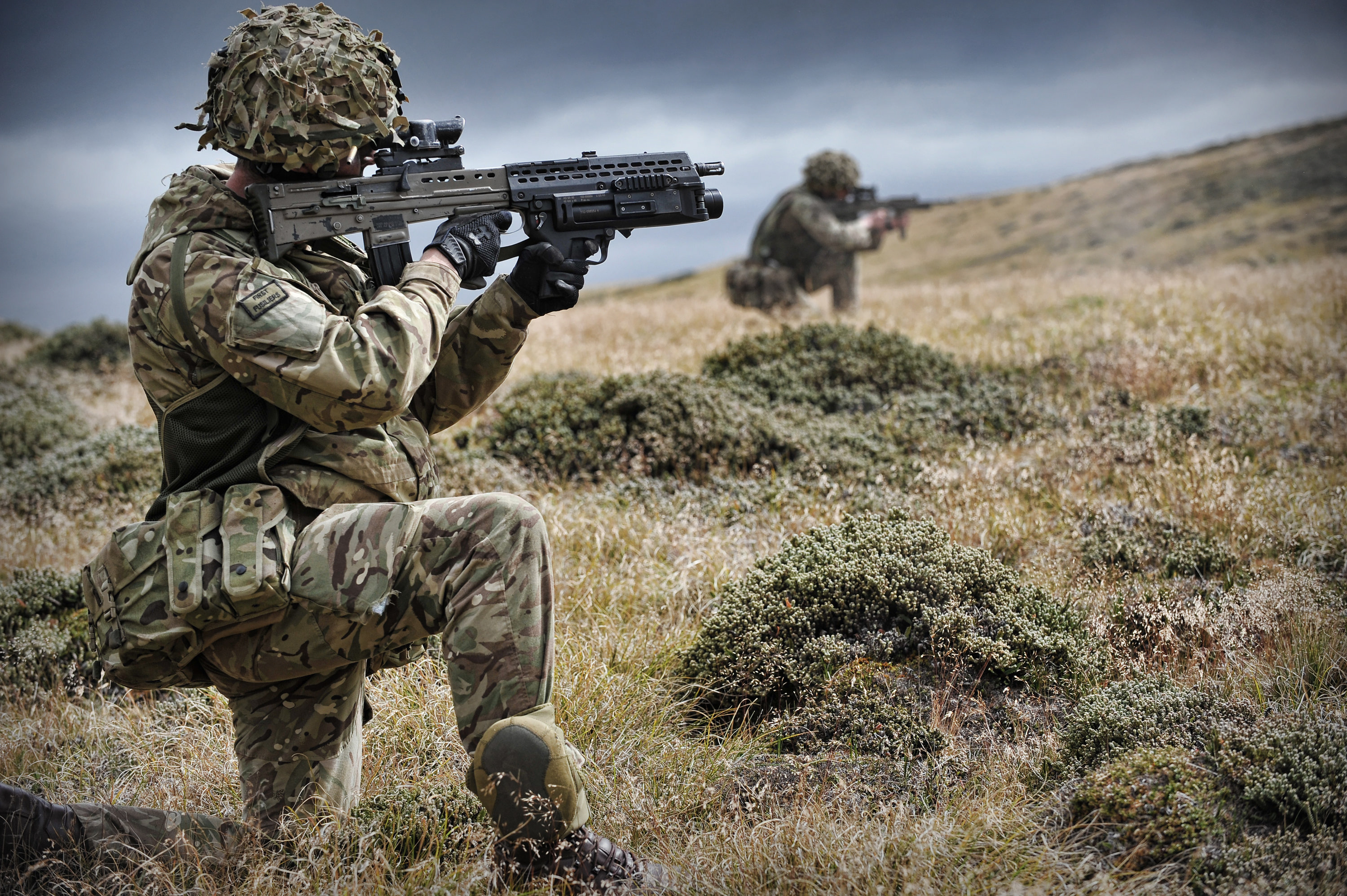
First Fusiliers in the Falklands

== Colours ==
The King's Colour of each battalion of the regiment is identical except for the battalion numeral. The field of this Colour is blue which is the same as the facing colour of the Regiment. The Regimental title is in gold in a crimson circle within a Union Wreath of roses, thistles and shamrocks. The Regimental title is in gold in a crimson circle within a Union Wreath of roses, thistles and shamrocks. St George within the Garter, which is the centre badge, is on a crimson ground within the circle. The whole is ensigned with St Edward’s Crown. Forty battle honours, 20 in respect of World War I and 20 in respect of World War II, are borne on scrolls in gold in three groups of six honours on each horizontal arm of St George’s Cross and one group of four honours on the lower vertical arm of the Cross. Honours are emblazoned in chronological order by theatres across the horizontal arm of the Cross and vertically on the lower arm of the Cross. The fringe is of crimson and gold alternate strands. Honorary distinction badges of the four former regiments are borne in each canton of the Colour:

- The Royal Northumberland Fusiliers - The United red and white rose slipped ensigned with the Royal Crest, in the upper canton nearer the pike.
- Royal Warwickshire Fusiliers - On a mount vert an Antelope statant argent, attired, tufted, ducally gorged and rope reflexed over the back, in the upper canton further from the pike.

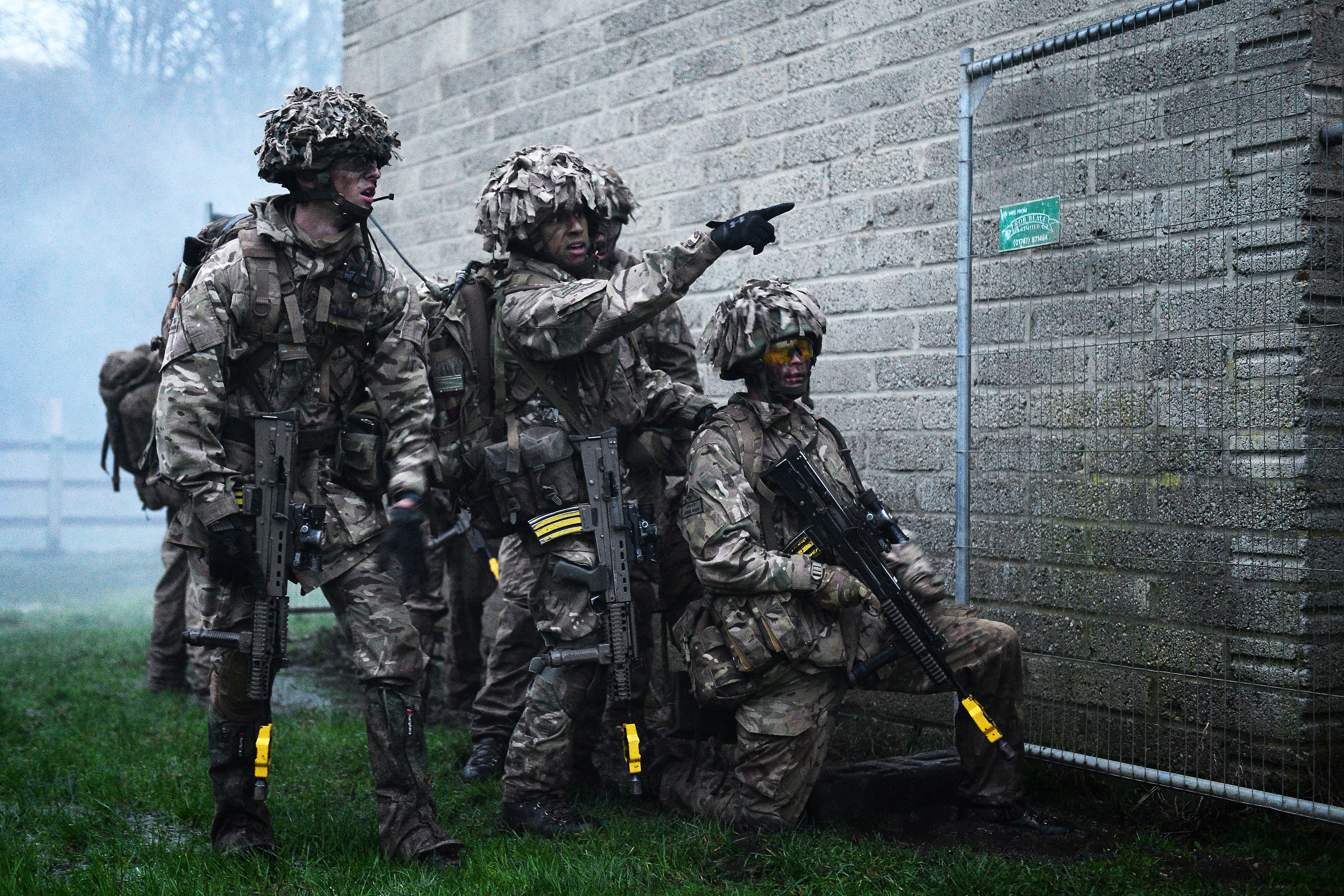
Fusiliers on exercise in the Salisbury Plain Training Area

- Royal Fusiliers - On a mount vert the White Horse of Hanover, in the lower canton nearer the pike.
- Lancashire Fusiliers - The red rose of Lancaster with two petals uppermost, in the lower canton further from the pike and The Sphinx, superscribed on a scroll ‘Egypt’, immediately below the tie of the large laurel wreath bearing the Battle Honour scrolls.

Finally, thirty-eight battle honours, which were borne on the Regimental Colours of the four former regiments, are emblazoned on gold scrolls placed on the branches of a large laurel wreath outside the Union Wreath.

"The British Grenadiers"
"The British Grenadiers", the official Regimental Quick March of the Royal Regiment of Fusiliers, performed by the United States Army Band Strings ensemble

The Drummer’s Colour (or Wilhelmstahl Colour) is of gosling green silk edged with gold, embroidered with St George and the Dragon in the centre, with red scrolls edged with gold, above and below. The motto of the Northumberland Fusiliers ‘QUO FATA VOCANT’ ('Wherever fate calls us') is, on the upper scroll, and the word ‘NORTHUMBERLAND’ between V REGT, also in gold, on the lower scroll. A wreath of green laurel with red berries and the ‘slipped’ red and white rose surmounted by a crown in the four corners, makes up the design. This unusual third colour is traditionally carried by the youngest drummer on the annual St George's Day parade.

== Band ==
A volunteer regimental band is sported by the 5th Battalion, based at the St George's Army Reserve Centre. Officially known as the Band and Corps of Drums, it consists of 30 servicemen who marching in the full dress uniform of the regiment and performs by permission of the Commanding Officer of Fifth Fusiliers. The corps of drums have a role in the band, leading parades and performing their black light show.

Until the Strategic Defence Review of 1998 the Regiment had two Territorial Army bands: the Northumberland Band of the 6th Battalion and the Warwickshire Band of the 5th Battalion. After the review, the Northumberland Band became the Northumbria Band of the Tyne-Tees Regiment while the Warwickshire Band was removed from the TA establishment and continued as a civilian band. In 2006, it was renamed to the Band of the Royal Regiment of Fusiliers. The Lancashire Association Band of the Royal Regiment of Fusiliers is also a volunteer band of the regiment.

=== Previous active duty bands ===
In April 1968, each of the four regular battalions inherited a battalion band. In November 1969, the 4th battalion band was merged into the other three bands. The regiment chose to form two full size bands in 1984; one being titled as "The Duke of Kent's Band" and the other as "The St George's" Band.

== Lineage of the regiment ==
1880	1881 Childers Reforms	1921 Name changes	1957 Defence White Paper	1966 Defence White Paper	1990 Options for Change	2003 Delivering Security in a Changing World
5th (Northumberland) (Fusiliers) Regiment of Foot	The Northumberland Fusiliers renamed in 1935: The Royal Northumberland Fusiliers			The Royal Regiment of Fusiliers		
6th (Royal First Warwickshire) Regiment of Foot	The Royal Warwickshire Regiment renamed in 1963: The Royal Warwickshire Fusiliers			The Royal Regiment of Fusiliers		
7th (Royal Fusiliers) Regiment of Foot	The Royal Fusiliers (City of London Regiment)			The Royal Regiment of Fusiliers		
20th (East Devonshire) Regiment of Foot	The Lancashire Fusiliers			The Royal Regiment of Fusiliers		

== Battle honours ==
The Royal Regiment of Fusiliers carries the combined battle honours of its four antecedent regiments, as well as two honours obtained during the years of the regiment's own existence. There are a total of 40 representative honours each emblazoned on the Queen's Colour and Regimental Colour.

- Combined Battle Honours of Royal Northumberland Fusiliers
- Combined Battle Honours of Royal Warwickshire Fusiliers
- Combined Battle Honours of Royal Fusiliers (City of London Regiment)
- Combined Battle Honours of Lancashire Fusiliers
- Wadi al Batin, Gulf 1991,
- Al Basrah, Iraq 2003

== Regimental colonels ==
Regimental Colonels have been:

- 1968–1974: Gen. Sir Kenneth Darling
- 1974–1977: Lt-Gen. Sir George Lea
- 1977–1982: Lt-Gen. Sir Alexander James Wilson
- 1982–1986: Maj-Gen. David Milner Woodford
- 1986–1996: Maj-Gen. Jeremy Calcott Reilly
- 1996–2001: Brig. David Arnold Kellett Biggart
- 2001–2007: Brig. Roy Maddox Wilde
- 2007–2012: Brig. Trevor J. Minter
- 2012–2015: Brig. David J. Paterson
- 2015–2020: Maj-Gen. Paul Nanson
- 2020-: Maj-Gen. Jonathan Swift

== Order of precedence ==
Preceded by Duke of Lancaster's Regiment	Infantry order of precedence	Succeeded by Royal Anglian Regiment

== Alliances ==
- Royal Navy - HMS Diamond
- Royal Navy - HMS Northumberland
- RAF - No. 13 Squadron RAF
- Canada - The Royal Canadian Regiment
- Canada - The Lorne Scots (Peel, Dufferin and Halton Regiment)
- Canada - 31 Combat Engineer Regiment (The Elgins)
- Canada - The Royal Westminster Regiment
- Canada - Les Fusiliers du S^{t}-Laurent
- Australia - The Royal Victoria Regiment
- New Zealand - The Hauraki Regiment
- The Worshipful Company of Mercers
- The Worshipful Company of Cordwainers
- The Worshipful Company of Fletchers

== See also ==
- The Royal Highland Fusiliers
- The Royal Welch Fusiliers
- The King's Own Fusiliers
