= Wessex Brigade =

The Wessex Brigade was an administrative formation of the British Army from 1948 to 1968. The Brigade administered the regular infantry regiments of the Wessex area of south and south west England.

After the Second World War the British Army had fourteen infantry depots, each bearing a letter. The depots were territorially organised, and Infantry Depot H at Bulford Camp in Wiltshire was the headquarters for the six county regiments that recruited in Berkshire, Devon, Dorset, Gloucestershire, Hampshire, the Isle of Wight and Wiltshire.

In 1948, the depots adopted names and this depot became the Wessex Brigade, with all regiments being reduced to a single battalion at the same time. The Wessex Brigade was formally formed at Exeter on 28 October 1948 and combined the depots of the following regiments:

- The Devonshire Regiment
- The Gloucestershire Regiment
- The Royal Hampshire Regiment
- The Dorsetshire Regiment renamed as The Dorset Regiment in 1951
- The Royal Berkshire Regiment (Princess Charlotte of Wales's)
- The Wiltshire Regiment (Duke of Edinburgh's)

Under the Defence Review announced in July 1957, the infantry of the line was reorganised, and the number of battalions was reduced to four by amalgamation. Accordingly, on 17 May 1958, the Devonshire Regiment and Dorset Regiment were amalgamated into the Devonshire and Dorset Regiment, while on 9 June 1959 the Royal Berkshire Regiment and the Wiltshire Regiment were merged into the Duke of Edinburgh's Royal Regiment (Berkshire and Wiltshire).

Proposals were made over the next decade to amalgamate the Gloucesters and Royal Hampshires, which went as far as the battalions reducing ready for amalgamation, but this was cancelled less than two weeks before formation day.

From 1958 all regiments in the Brigade adopted a common cap badge consisting of the Wessex wyvern on a plinth inscribed Wessex. From 1960 the Wessex Brigade was based at Wyvern Barracks in Exeter.

On 1 July 1968 the Wessex Brigade was united with the Welsh and Mercian Brigades, to form the Prince of Wales's Division.
