= Yorkshire Brigade =

British Army infantry formation

The Yorkshire Brigade was an administrative brigade formation of the British Army from 1948 to 1968. The brigade administered the regular infantry regiments of Yorkshire, England.

After the Second World War there were 14 infantry depots in Britain, each bearing a letter. The depots were territorially organised, and Infantry Depot E at Catterick was the headquarters for six line county regiments recruiting in Yorkshire and Northumberland.

In 1948, the depots adopted names and this depot became the Yorkshire and Northumberland Brigade, with all regiments being reduced to a single battalion at the same time. The brigade was formed on 14 July 1948 and combined the depots of the following regiments:

- The Royal Northumberland Fusiliers
- The West Yorkshire Regiment (The Prince of Wales's Own)
- The East Yorkshire Regiment (The Duke of York's Own)
- The Green Howards (Alexandra, Princess of Wales's Own Yorkshire Regiment)
- The Duke of Wellington's Regiment (West Riding)
- The York and Lancaster Regiment

Under the defence review announced in July 1957, the number of battalions in the brigade was reduced to four in 1958: the East Yorkshire Regiment and the West Yorkshire Regiment were amalgamated into the Prince of Wales's Own Regiment of Yorkshire, while the Royal Northumberland Fusiliers were transferred to the newly formed Fusilier Brigade. This led to the Yorkshire and Northumberland Brigade being renamed as simply the Yorkshire Brigade.

As part of the 1958 reforms, all regiments in the Brigade adopted a common cap badge depicting a crowned white rose above a scroll inscribed "Yorkshire". Regimental collar badges continued to be worn. From 1960 the Yorkshire Brigade was based at Queen Elizabeth Barracks in Strensall.

On 1 July 1968 the Yorkshire Brigade was united with the Lancastrian and North Irish Brigades, to form the King's Division.
