= Forester Brigade =

F Group Midland Brigade Forester Brigade
- Active: 1946–1963
- Country: United Kingdom
- Branch: British Army
- Type: Administrative

The Forester Brigade (known as the Midland Brigade until 1958) was an administrative formation of the British Army from 1948 to 1964. The Brigade administered the regular infantry regiments of the English Midlands.

After the Second World War the British Army had fourteen infantry depots, each bearing a letter. The depots were territorially organised, and Infantry Depot F at Strensall was the headquarters for the county regiments of Derbyshire, Leicestershire, Lincolnshire, Nottinghamshire and Warwickshire.

In 1948, the depots adopted names and this depot became the Midland Brigade with all regiments being reduced to a single battalion at the same time. The Midland Brigade was formally formed on 14 July 1948, combining the depots of four regiments:

- The Royal Warwickshire Regiment
- The Royal Lincolnshire Regiment
- The Royal Leicestershire Regiment
- The Sherwood Foresters (Nottinghamshire and Derbyshire Regiment)

Under the 1957 Defence White Paper changes announced in July 1957, the infantry of the line was reorganised: accordingly, in 1958, the Royal Lincolnshire Regiment was transferred to the East Anglian Brigade and the Midland Brigade was renamed as the Forester Brigade.

From 1958 all regiments in the Brigade adopted a common cap badge: "A Maltese cross voided, the points pommelled, and thereon, on a mount, an antelope statant gorged with a ducal coronet and chained within The Garter, the whole encircled with a chaplet of oak-leaves issuant from a scroll inscribed 'Forester Brigade' and ensigned with, upon a mount, a tiger passant guardant. The badge combined parts of the cap badges of the Royal Warwicks, Royal Leicesters and Sherwood Foresters. From 1960 the Forester Brigade was based at Glen Parva Barracks in Leicestershire.

In 1963, the Royal Warwickshire Regiment was transferred to the Fusilier Brigade, and in the following year the Royal Leicestershire Regiment joined the East Anglian Brigade and the Sherwood Foresters moved to the Mercian Brigade. With this, the Forester Brigade was disbanded.

== Units ==
During its existence, the brigade was made up of the following units:

=== Regular battalions ===
- 1st Battalion, Royal Warwickshire Regiment (1946–1962)
- 2nd Battalion, Royal Warwickshire Regiment (1946–1948}
- 1st Battalion, Royal Lincolnshire Regiment (1946–1958)
- 2nd Battalion, Royal Lincolnshire Regiment (1946–1948)
- 1st Battalion, Royal Leicestershire Regiment (1946–1963)
- 2nd Battalion, Royal Leicestershire Regiment (1946–1948)
- 1st Battalion, Sherwood Foresters (Nottinghamshire and Derbyshire Regiment) (1946–1963)
- 2nd Battalion, Sherwood Foresters (Nottinghamshire and Derbyshire Regiment) (1946–1948, 1952–1955)

=== Territorial battalions ===
- 7th Battalion, Royal Warwickshire Regiment (1947–1962)
- 2/7th Battalion, Royal Warwickshire Regiment (1947–1950)
- 4th Battalion, Royal Lincolnshire Regiment (1947–1950)
- 6th Battalion, Royal Lincolnshire Regiment (1947–1950)
- 4th/6th Battalion, Royal Lincolnshire Regiment (1950–1958)
- 5th Battalion, Royal Leicestershire Regiment (1947–1961)
- 4th/5th Battalion, Royal Leicestershire Regiment (1961–1963)
- 5th (Derbyshire) Battalion, Sherwood Foresters (Nottinghamshire and Derbyshire Regiment) (1947–1961)
- 8th (Nottinghamshire) Battalion, Sherwood Foresters (Nottinghamshire and Derbyshire Regiment) (1947–1961)
- 5th/8th Battalion, Sherwood Foresters (Nottinghamshire and Derbyshire Regiment) (1961–1963)
