= East Anglian Brigade =

G Group East Anglian Brigade
- Active: 1946–1968
- Country: United Kingdom
- Branch: British Army
- Type: Administrative
- Garrison/HQ: Gibraltar Barracks, Bury St Edmunds

Commanders
- Representative Colonel: Lt-Gen Sir Reginald Denning

The East Anglian Brigade (known as G Group until 1948) was an administrative brigade of the British Army from 1946 to 1968, that administered the regiments with recruiting grounds in East Anglia, and the East of England.

== History ==
After the Second World War the British Army had fourteen infantry depots, each bearing a letter. The depots were territorially organised, and Infantry Depot G at Colchester was the headquarters for the county regiments of Bedfordshire, Cambridgeshire, Essex, Hertfordshire, Huntingdonshire, Norfolk, Northamptonshire and Suffolk.

In 1948, the depots adopted names and this depot became the East Anglian Brigade, with all regiments being reduced to a single battalion at the same time. The East Anglian Brigade was formed on 14 July 1948 at Gibraltar Barracks, Bury St Edmunds as an administrative apparatus for the infantry regiments from East Anglia:

- The Royal Norfolk Regiment (until 1959)
- The Suffolk Regiment (until 1959)
- The Bedfordshire and Hertfordshire Regiment (until 1958)
- The Essex Regiment (until 1958)
- The Northamptonshire Regiment (until 1960)

Under the Defence Review announced in July 1957, the infantry of the line was reorganised: In 1958, the Royal Lincolnshire Regiment was transferred from the Forester Brigade, and by 1960 the six individual regiments had amalgamated to form three "East Anglian Regiments":

- Bedfordshire and Hertfordshire Regiment and Essex Regiment - 3rd East Anglian Regiment (16th/44th Foot) on 2 June 1958
- Royal Norfolk Regiment and Suffolk Regiment - 1st East Anglian Regiment (Royal Norfolk and Suffolk) on 29 August 1959
- Royal Lincolnshire Regiment and Northamptonshire Regiment - 2nd East Anglian Regiment (Duchess of Gloucester's Own Royal Lincolnshire and Northamptonshire) on 1 June 1960

At the same time East Anglian Brigade cap badges and buttons replaced those of the individual regiments. The cap badge was a silver eight-pointed star bearing the castle and key of Gibraltar, with a scroll inscribed "East Anglia". The key and castle was a badge awarded to predecessors of all three regiments for their part in the Great Siege of Gibraltar from 1779 - 1783. The brigade buttons were identical to those of the Royal Norfolk Regiment, bearing the figure of Britannia.

The three regiments could be distinguished by their collar badges and coloured lanyards:

- The 1st East Anglian Regiment wore collar badges consisting of Britannia in front of the Castle of Gibraltar and a yellow lanyard
- The 2nd East Anglian Regiment wore collar badges consisting of a sphinx on a tablet inscribed "Egypt" over a scroll with the battle honour Talavera and a black lanyard
- The 3rd East Anglian Regiment wore collar badges depicting a Napoleonic eagle enclosed within the Garter and a pompadour purple (claret purple) lanyard

In 1963, the Royal Leicestershire Regiment was transferred from the Forester Brigade. The regiment wore collar badges comprising a royal tiger within an unbroken wreath of laurel and a pearl grey, black and scarlet lanyard.

In 1964, all four were amalgamated to form a new, large regiment called the Royal Anglian Regiment. The new regiment's cap badge was similar to that of the East Anglian Brigade except that the scroll was now inscribed "Royal Anglian" and the cap badge is now smaller..

On 1 July 1968 the East Anglian Brigade was united with the Fusilier Brigade and the Home Counties Brigades, to form the Queen's Division.

== Units ==
Throughout its existence, the brigade was made up of the following units:

=== Regular battalions ===
- 1st Battalion, Royal Norfolk Regiment (1946–1959)
- 2nd Battalion, Royal Norfolk Regiment (1946–1948)
- 1st Battalion, Suffolk Regiment (1946–1959)
- 2nd Battalion, Suffolk Regiment (1946–1948)
- 1st Battalion, Bedfordshire and Hertfordshire Regiment (1946–1958)
- 2nd Battalion, Bedfordshire and Hertfordshire Regiment (1946–1948)
- 1st Battalion, Essex Regiment (1946–1958)
- 2nd Battalion, Essex Regiment (1946–1948)
- 1st Battalion, Northamptonshire Regiment (1946–1960)
- 2nd Battalion, Northamptonshire Regiment (1946–1948)
- 1st Battalion, Royal Lincolnshire Regiment (1958–1960)
- 1st Battalion, 3rd East Anglian Regiment (1958–1964)
- 1st Battalion, 1st East Anglian Regiment (1959–1964)
- 1st Battalion, 2nd East Anglian Regiment (1960–1964)
- 1st Battalion, Royal Leicestershire Regiment (1963–1964)
- 1st Battalion, Royal Anglian Regiment (1964–1968)
- 2nd Battalion, Royal Anglian Regiment (1964–1968)
- 3rd Battalion, Royal Anglian Regiment (1964–1968)
- 4th Battalion, Royal Anglian Regiment (1964–1968)

=== Territorial Battalions ===
- 4th Battalion, Royal Norfolk Regiment (1947–1967)
- 4th Battalion, Suffolk Regiment (1947–1961)
- 1st Battalion, Cambridgeshire Regiment (1956–1961)
- 5th Battalion, Bedfordshire and Hertfordshire Regiment (1947–1958)
- 1st Battalion, Hertfordshire Regiment (1947–1961)
- 4th Battalion, Essex Regiment (1947–1961)
- 5th (Huntingdonshire) Battalion, Northamptonshire Regiment (1947–1961)
- 4th/6th Battalion, Royal Lincolnshire Regiment (1958–1967)
- Bedfordshire Regiment (TA) (1958–1961)
- Suffolk and Cambridgeshire Regiment (1961–1967)
- Bedfordshire and Hertfordshire Regiment (TA) (1961–1967)
- 4th/5th Battalion, Essex Regiment (1961–1967)
- 4th/5th Battalion, Northamptonshire Regiment (1961–1967)
- 4th/5th Battalion, Royal Leicestershire Regiment (1963–1967)
- 5th (V) Battalion, Royal Anglian Regiment (1967–1968)
- Royal Norfolk Regiment (T) (1967–1969)
- Suffolk and Cambridgeshire Regiment (T) (1967–1969)
- Royal Lincolnshire Regiment (T) (1967–1969)
- Bedfordshire and Hertfordshire Regiment (T) (1967–1969)
- Essex Regiment (T) (1967–1969)
- Northamptonshire Regiment (T) (1967–1969)
- Royal Leicestershire Regiment (T) (1967–1969)
