= Mercian Brigade =

British Army administrative formation

The Mercian Brigade was an administrative formation of the British Army from 1948 to 1964. The Brigade administered the infantry regiments from the area of England between the Trent, Mersey and Severn rivers that roughly corresponded to the ancient kingdom of Mercia.

After the Second World War, the British Army had fourteen infantry depots, each bearing a letter. The depots were territorially organised, with Infantry Depot K at Whittington Barracks near Lichfield was the headquarters for the county regiments of Cheshire, Staffordshire, and Worcestershire.

In 1948, the depots adopted names and this depot became the Mercian Brigade, with all regiments being reduced to a single battalion at the same time. The Mercian Brigade was formed on 14 July 1948, combining the depots of the following regiments:

- The Cheshire Regiment
- The Worcestershire Regiment
- The South Staffordshire Regiment
- The North Staffordshire Regiment (The Prince of Wales's)

Under the Defence Review announced in July, 1957, the infantry of the line was reorganised: accordingly, in 1959, the South Staffordshire Regiment and North Staffordshire Regiment were amalgamated to form the Staffordshire Regiment (The Prince of Wales's).

As part of the reforms, all regiments in the brigade adopted a common cap badge in 1958. This consisted of a gold Saxon crown over a silver double-headed eagle, being the attributed device of Leofric, Earl of Mercia. The battalions were distinguished by regimental collar badges and coloured lanyards: cerise for the Cheshires, green for the Worcestershires and black for the Staffords.

On 1 May 1963, the brigade was again increased to four regular battalions, when the Sherwood Foresters (Nottinghamshire and Derbyshire Regiment) were transferred from the dissolved Forester Brigade. The regiment wore a Lincoln green lanyard.

On 1 July 1968, the Mercian Brigade was united with the Wessex Brigade and Welsh Brigade, to form the Prince of Wales' Division.
