= 3rd East Anglian Regiment =

- Active: 2 June 1958 – 1 September 1964
- Country: United Kingdom
- Branch: British Army
- Type: Infantry
- Role: Line infantry
- Size: Battalion

Commanders
- Colonel-in-Chief: Queen Elizabeth The Queen Mother

The 3rd East Anglian Regiment (16th/44th Foot) was an infantry regiment of the British Army, formed as part of the short-lived East Anglian Brigade.

== History ==
As a result of the 1957 Defence Review, the 1st Battalion, Bedfordshire and Hertfordshire Regiment and the 1st Battalion, Essex Regiment amalgamated on 2 June 1958 to form the 3rd East Anglian Regiment (16th/44th Foot).

From its inception, the 3rd East Anglians were based in Dortmund, West Germany, the home of the Essex Regiment prior to amalgamation. In 1959, the regiment was posted to Malaya shortly before the state of emergency there was declared over. The regiment served with 28 Commonwealth Brigade until 1962, when it was posted to Northern Ireland.

The regiment's brief existence came to an end when it amalgamated with three other battalions of the East Anglian Brigade on 1 September 1964, to form one of the new 'large' regiments, the Royal Anglian Regiment; The 3rd East Anglian Regiment became the 3rd Battalion (16th/44th Foot).

== Badges and dress distinctions ==
The regiment's badge consisted of a Napoleonic eagle enclosed within the Garter, combining elements of the insignia of the two merging units. The Garter had formed part of the badge adopted by the then Bedfordshire Regiment in 1898, while the Napoleonic eagle was the collar badge of the Essex Regiment from 1947. The eagle of the French 62nd Regiment was captured by one of the regiment's predecessors at the Battle of Salamanca in 1812.

The eagle and garter badge appeared in the centre of the colours presented to the 1st battalion on 30 May 1959.

A common cap badge and buttons were worn by all regular battalions of the East Anglian Brigade from 1958. The 3rd East Anglian Regiment's uniform was distinguished by eagle and garter collar badges and by the wearing of a lanyard of pompadour purple. The purple lanyard had been worn by the Essex Regiment, having originally been the facing colour of the 56th Regiment of Foot. The regiment also had a distinctive stable belt, black with purple stripes edged in amber, a combination of those of the two constituents.

The collar badges and lanyard of the 3rd East Anglians continued to be worn by the 3rd battalion of the Royal Anglian Regiment after the 1964 amalgamation. Since 1992, when the battalion was disbanded, all parts of the Royal Anglians wear a gold eagle on a purple backing as an arm badge.

== Alliances ==
The regiment's alliances included:

- Australia 11th/44th Infantry Battalion (The City of Perth Regiment)—Australia (1958–1964)
- Australia 16th Infantry Battalion(The Cameron Highlanders of Western Australia)—Australia (1936 - 1960)
- Canada The Essex and Kent Scottish—Canada (1958–1964)
- South Africa The First City Regiment—South Africa (1958–1961)

Preceded by Bedfordshire and Hertfordshire Regiment; Essex Regiment	3rd East Anglian Regiment; 1959–1964	Succeeded by Royal Anglian Regiment
