= Lancastrian Brigade =

The Lancastrian Brigade was an administrative formation of the British Army from 1948 to 1968. The Brigade administered the regular infantry regiments of northwest England.

After the Second World War, the British Army had fourteen infantry depots, each bearing a letter. The depots were territorially organised, and Infantry Depot D at Carlisle was the headquarters for the county regiments of Cumberland, Lancashire and Westmorland.

In 1948, the depots adopted names and this depot became the Lancastrian Brigade, with all regiments being reduced to a single battalion at the same time. The Lancastrian Brigade was formed on 14 July 1948, combining the depots of eight regiments:

- The King's Own Royal Regiment (Lancaster)
- The King's Regiment (Liverpool)
- The Lancashire Fusiliers
- The East Lancashire Regiment
- The Border Regiment
- The South Lancashire Regiment (Prince of Wales's Volunteers)
- The Loyal Regiment (North Lancashire)
- The Manchester Regiment

Under the Defence Review announced in July 1957, the infantry of the line was reorganised, and by 1959 the Brigade was reduced to four battalions:

- On 1 April 1958, the Lancashire Fusiliers were transferred to the newly formed Fusilier Brigade therefore not now part of the Lancastrian Brigade.
- On 1 July 1958, the East Lancashire Regiment and South Lancashire Regiment were amalgamated as the Lancashire Regiment (Prince of Wales's Volunteers)
- On 1 September 1958, the King's Regiment (Liverpool) and the Manchester Regiment were merged as the King's Regiment (Manchester and Liverpool)
- On 1 October 1959, the King's Own Royal Regiment and the Border Regiment were merged to form the King's Own Royal Border Regiment.
- The Loyal Regiment (North Lancashire) was the fourth battalion.

From 1958, all regiments in the Brigade adopted a common cap badge: the red rose of Lancaster within a laurel wreath and ensigned by the royal crest, with a scroll inscribed Lancastrian. From 1960, the Lancastrian Brigade was based at Fulwood Barracks in Lancashire.

On 1 July 1968, the Lancastrian Brigade was united with the Yorkshire and North Irish Brigades, to form the King's Division.
