= Gibraltar Barracks, Bury St Edmunds =

Gibraltar Barracks
- Bury St Edmunds
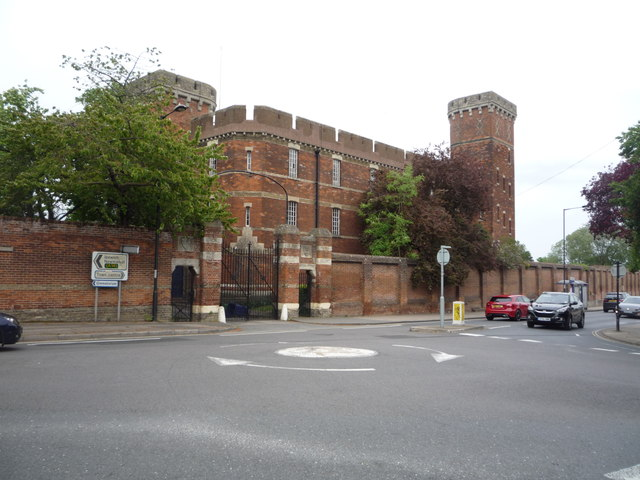
- Gibraltar Barracks

Site information
- Type: Barracks
- Owner: Ministry of Defence
- Operator: British Army

Location
- Location within Suffolk
- Coordinates: 52°14′53″N 00°41′54″E

Site history
- Built: 1878
- Built for: War Office
- Architect: Major HC Seddon RE
- In use: 1878-2010s

Garrison information
- Occupants: Royal Anglian Regiment

Gibraltar Barracks is a former British Army installation located on Out Risbygate, Bury St Edmunds. It is now home to the Suffolk Regiment Museum.

== History ==
The barracks were opened in 1878. Their creation took place as part of the Cardwell Reforms which encouraged the localisation of British military forces. The barracks became the depot for the two battalions of the 12th (East Suffolk) Regiment of Foot. Following the Childers Reforms, the regiment evolved to become the Suffolk Regiment with its depot in the barracks in 1881. The barracks went on to become the regional centre for infantry training as the East Anglian Brigade Depot in 1960, and remains the regimental headquarters of the Royal Anglian Regiment.

== Suffolk Regiment Museum ==
The Suffolk Regiment Museum was established in the officers' mess in 1935 before moving to the keep in the late 1960s. It includes uniforms, weapons, regimental trophies, badges, insignia, musical items and other memorabilia.
