= Home Counties Brigade =

The Home Counties Brigade was an administrative formation of the British Army from 1948 to 1968. The Brigade administered the regular infantry regiments of the Home Counties of south east England.

After the Second World War the British Army had fourteen infantry depots, each bearing a letter. The depots were territorially organised, and Infantry Depot C at Howe Barracks in Canterbury was the headquarters for the seven county regiments of the City and County of London, Kent, Middlesex, Surrey and Sussex.

In 1948, the depots adopted names and this depot became the Home Counties Brigade, with all regiments being reduced to a single battalion at the same time. The Home Counties Brigade was formally formed on 14 July 1948, combining the depots of the following regiments:

- The Queen's Royal Regiment (West Surrey)
- The Buffs (Royal East Kent Regiment)
- The Royal Fusiliers (City of London Regiment)
- The East Surrey Regiment
- The Royal Sussex Regiment
- The Queen's Own Royal West Kent Regiment
- The Middlesex Regiment (Duke of Cambridge's Own)

Under the Defence Review announced in July, 1957, the infantry of the line was reorganised: On 1 April 1958 the Royal Fusiliers were transferred to a newly created Fusilier Brigade, and over the next three years the remaining six regiments were reduced to four by amalgamation.

From 1958 all regiments in the Brigade adopted a common cap badge and brigade buttons, depicting an upright sword within a Saxon crown. The individual battalions were henceforth being distinguished by their collar badges. By 1961 the four regiments in the brigade were:

Regiment	Collar badge
The Queen's Royal Surrey Regiment (formed October 14, 1959 from the Queen's Royal and East Surrey Regiments)	On a crowned, eight-pointed star, a paschal lamb
The Queen's Own Buffs, The Royal Kent Regiment (formed March 1, 1961 from the Buffs and the Royal West Kent Regiment)	The white horse of Kent with the motto"Invicta" and a scroll with the regiment's name.
The Royal Sussex Regiment	In front of the Roussillon plume, a Maltese cross, in the centre of which was St George's cross within the Garter and a laurel wreath.
The Middlesex Regiment (Duke of Cambridge's Own)	The plumes of the Prince of Wales and cypher of the Duke of Cambridge within a laurel wreath, with a scroll inscribed "Albuhera"

On 31 December 1966 the four regiments of the Home Counties Brigade were merged to become a new "large regiment": The Queen's Regiment, with the four regular battalions redesignated as the 1st to 4th Battalions of the new regiment.

On 1 July 1968 the Home Counties Brigade was united with the Fusilier and East Anglian Brigades, to form the Queen's Division.
