= St George's Barracks, Sutton Coldfield =

St George's Barracks
- Sutton Coldfield
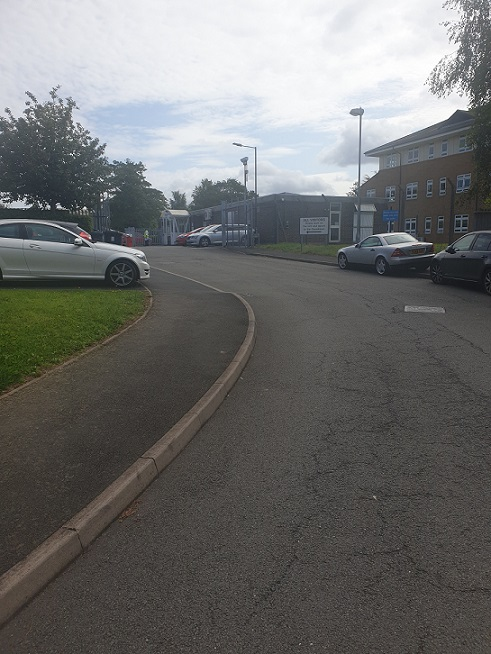
- Main gate at St George's House, Sutton Coldfield

Site information
- Type: Barracks
- Owner: Ministry of Defence
- Operator: British Army

Location
- Location within West Midlands
- Coordinates: 52°34′09″N 01°47′51″W

Site history
- Built: 1960
- Built for: War Office
- In use: 1960–c.2000

St George's Barracks, Sutton Coldfield was a military installation in Sutton Coldfield.

== History ==
Originally built in 1942 as the home of 216 Maintenance Unit RAF, the site was renamed St George's Barracks and became the regional centre for infantry training as the Fusilier Brigade Depot in 1960. The barracks went on to be the army personnel selection centre for England, Wales and Northern Ireland in 1971. The Army personnel selection centre closed in early summer 1994 and most of the land was later sold off for housing. The Defence Infrastructure Organisation still remains in offices at St George's House.
