= North Irish Brigade =

The North Irish Brigade was a Brigade of the British Army which existed between 1948 and 1968; it consisted of the three regiments from Northern Ireland (each regiment was reduced to a single battalion on 14 July 1948). After the Second World War there were 14 infantry depots in the United Kingdom, each bearing a letter. The depots were territorially aligned, and Infantry Depot M at Omagh was aligned with the regiments from Northern Ireland.

In 1948, the depots switched to names and this depot became the North Irish Brigade, with all regiments being reduced to a single battalion at the same time. The North Irish Brigade was formed on 14 July 1948 as an administrative apparatus for the infantry regiments from Northern Ireland:

- The Royal Inniskilling Fusiliers
- The Royal Ulster Rifles
- The Royal Irish Fusiliers (Princess Victoria's)

From 1964 the North Irish Brigade was based at St Patrick's Barracks in Ballymena.

On 1 July 1968 the three regiments were amalgamated into a single large regiment named the Royal Irish Rangers (27th (Inniskilling), 83rd and 87th) and the North Irish Brigade was united with the Yorkshire and Lancastrian Brigades, to form the King's Division.
