= Welsh Brigade =

British Military Formation

The Welsh Brigade was an administrative formation of the British Army from 1948 to 1964. The Brigade administered the regular Welsh infantry regiments.

After the Second World War the British Army had fourteen infantry depots, each bearing a letter. The depots were territorially organised, and Infantry Depot L at Brecon was the headquarters for the county regiments of Wales and Monmouthshire.

In 1948, the depots adopted names and this depot became the Welsh Brigade, with all regiments being reduced to a single battalion at the same time. The Welsh Brigade was formed on 14 July 1948 combining the depots of three regiments:

- The Royal Welch Fusiliers
- The South Wales Borderers
- The Welch Regiment

From 1958 all regiments in the Brigade adopted a common cap badge, depicting the plumes and motto of the Prince of Wales. From 1960 the Welsh Brigade was based at Cwrt y Gollen.

On 1 July 1968 the Welsh Brigade was united with the Wessex Brigade and Mercian Brigade, to form the Prince of Wales' Division.
