= Howe Barracks =

- Canterbury
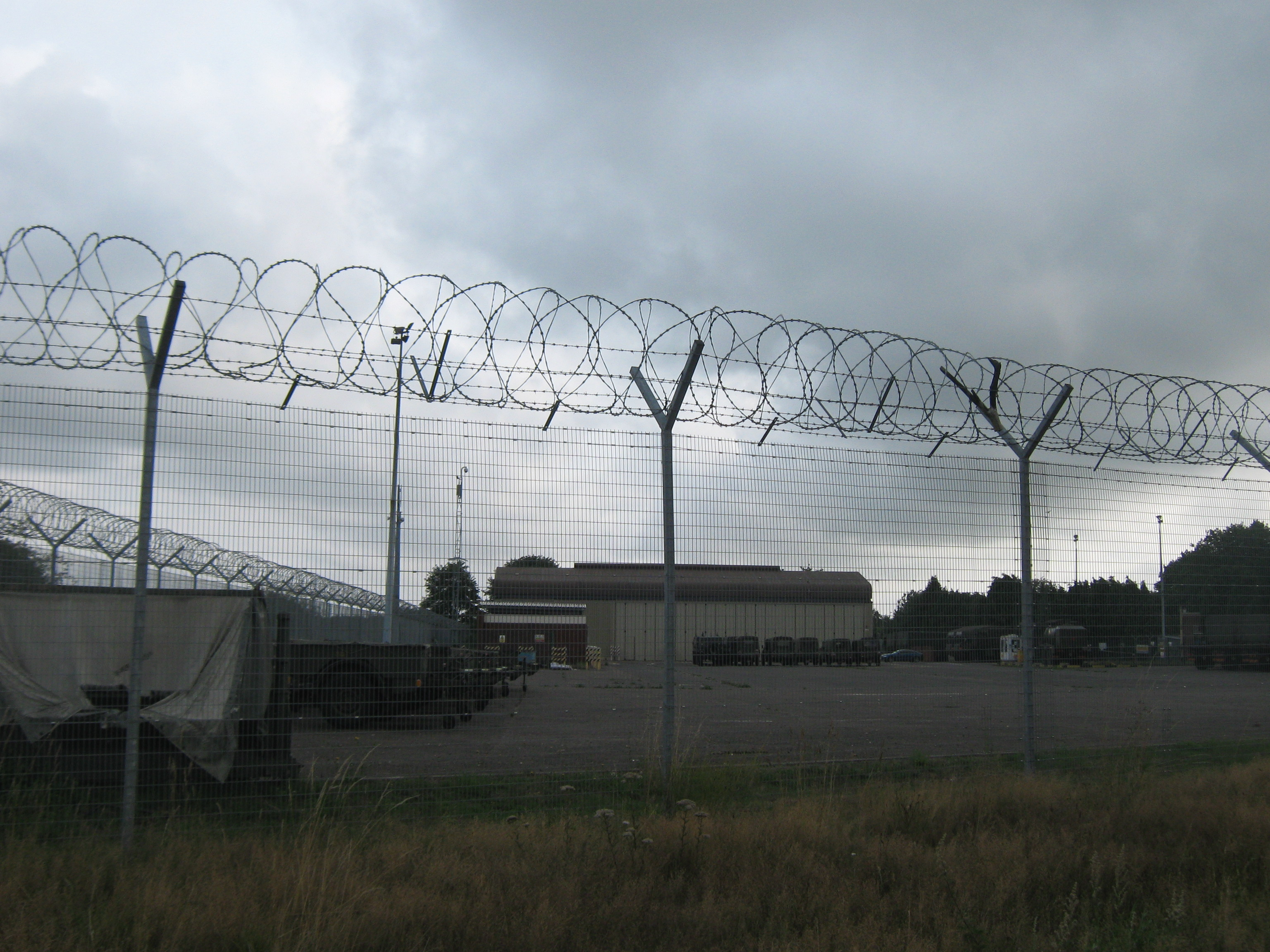
- Howe Barracks

Site information
- Type: Barracks
- Owner: Ministry of Defence
- Operator: British Army

Location
- Location within Kent
- Coordinates: 51°16′46″N 01°06′04″E

Site history
- Built: 1930s
- Built for: War Office
- In use: 1930s-2015

Garrison information
- Occupants: 3rd Bn Princess of Wales's Royal Regiment

Howe Barracks was a military installation in Canterbury in Kent.

== History ==
Permanent barracks were first established in Canterbury when William Baldock initiated construction of "St Gregory’s Barracks", an infantry barracks on Sturry Road, as part of the British response to the threat of the French Revolution, in 1793. Sir Edward Hales completed construction of the cavalry barracks slightly further up Sturry Road in 1795 and artillery barracks were built on land between these sites around the same time. In 1873 a system of recruiting areas based on counties was instituted under the Cardwell Reforms and the barracks became the depot for the two battalions of the 3rd (East Kent) Regiment of Foot. Following the Childers Reforms, the regiment evolved to become the Buffs (East Kent Regiment) with its depot in the barracks in 1881. These 18th century barracks fell into a state of disrepair in the early part of the 20th century, were withdrawn from use in the 1930s and were ultimately demolished in 1967.

New barracks were established on a new site, half a mile to the south-east of the old barracks, during the 1930s: these barracks became the new home of the Buffs (Royal East Kent Regiment). They were named after Lieutenant Colonel Gerard Howe, a former commanding officer of the Buffs, and went on to become the regional centre for infantry training as the Home Counties Brigade Depot in 1960. They also became the depot and Regimental Headquarters for the Queen's Regiment in 1966, for the Princess of Wales's Royal Regiment in 1992 and for the 5th Battalion, the Royal Regiment of Scotland (the Argyll and Sutherland Highlanders) in 2003. The Queen visited the Argyll and Sutherland Highlanders at Howe Barracks in Canterbury in June 2013 to mark their relocation to Scotland. The barracks were also the home of reservists serving with 3rd Battalion Princess of Wales's Royal Regiment. The barracks closed in February 2015.
