= Wilfred Nevill =

Captain Wilfred Percy Nevill
- Born: 14 July 1894; Canonbury Park, London
- Died: 1 July 1916 (aged 21); Montauban-de-Picardie, France
- Burial place: Carnoy Military Commonwealth War Graves Commission Cemetery, Carnoy-Mametz (grave ref. E. 28)
- Military career
- Allegiance: British Empire
- Branch: British Army
- Service years: 1914 – 1916
- Rank: Captain
- Nickname: "Billie"
- Units: 8th Battalion, the East Surrey Regiment, part of the 18th Division
- Conflicts: World War I

Wilfred (Billie) Nevill (14 July 1894 – 1 July 1916) was an officer attached to the East Surrey Regiment in the First World War. He became famous as the officer who kicked a football into No Man's Land at the start of the Battle of the Somme. He was promptly killed in action while leading an assault on a German position.

== Early life ==
Wilfred Percy Nevill was born at Canonbury Park in London on 14 July 1894 to a coal merchant father. He was one of four brothers and three sisters, raised at homes in Westgate-on-Sea and Twickenham.

He went to school at Dover College, where he was head prefect as well as captain of the cricket and hockey teams. He also played in the 1st XV for the rugby team and ran in the running team first team.

After completing his studies at Dover he went up to Jesus College, Cambridge in 1913 to study the Classical Tripos. He demonstrated his sporting abilities at university, playing hockey for the college. An annual report from the period states that Nevill was “only one freshman worthy of his colours”.

The Jesus College magazine, The Chanticlere, describes Nevill's style of play -

...his tackling is brilliant but he does not help his forwards too cleverly. Probably would be better at back, as he can deal the ball a shrewd blow.

— The Chanticlere, Lent Term 1914, p46

Nevill had been at Cambridge University for a year when war was declared. In that year he had enjoyed trips by motorcycle, watched Wimbledon tennis champion A.F. Wilding in and exhibition match and witnessed Gustav Hamel flying over the city.

== First World War ==
Prior to the war Nevill was a member of the Cambridge University Officer Training Corp and attended the 1914 summer training camp at Mytchett. He enlisted in November 1914 and was promoted to captain and signed up to service with the regular army.

Writing to his sister just prior to the Battle of the Somme, Nevill describes his experience of being under artillery bombardment:

As I write, the shells are fairly haring over; you know one gets just sort of bemused after a few million, still it’ll be a great experience to tell one’s children about. So long, old thing, don’t worry if you don't hear for a bit. I'm as happy as ever. Yrs ever, Bill.

— Captain Wilfred Nevill

=== Battle of the Somme ===
Nevill joined the East Yorkshire Regiment but transferred to the East Surrey Regiment and was the originator of the East Surrey’s famous “Football Charge” on the first day of the Battle of the Somme, 1 July 1916.

On the first day of the Battle of the Somme, the 8th Battalion Royal East Surrey Regiment left their trenches at Carnoy to attack the German position at Montauban 300 yards away. There were some reports that four balls were used, one for each company of the 8th Battalion. However, historians conclude that the evidence available points to there only being two used.

Nevill and his fellow officers were concerned about how their men would behave when finally called on to go over the top. To provide his soldiers with a reassuringly familiar symbol, Nevill bought the footballs while on leave in London and took them back with him to France.

A fellow officer, Second Lieutenant C.W. Alcock, wrote to Nevill's sister -

There were two footballs, and on one was printed:- "The Great European Cup-Tie Final. East Surreys v Bavarians. Kick off at zero." On the other in large letters was this: “NO REFEREE”, which was W.’s way of telling the men they needn’t treat the Hun too gently. Five minutes before ‘zero’ hour (7.30 am) your brother strolled up in his usual calm way and we shared a last joke before going over. The Company went over the top very well, with Soames and your brother kicking off with the Company footballs.

— Second Lieutenant C.W. Alcock, Billie. The Nevill Letters: 1914-1916

Nevill died on the first day of the Battle of the Somme, just two weeks short of his 22nd birthday. He fell in front of the German barbed wire, shot as he was about to throw a hand grenade.

Alcock in writing to Nevill's sister, said of her brother -

The surviving... men of B Coy (now, alas, a mere handful) had the greatest admiration for Nevill’s qualities as a soldier & a Company Commander; but in addition to this, his personal charm & never failing good humour & courage, the interest he took in every individual under his command, made him loved by everyone

— Second Lieutenant C.W. Alcock

Writing to Nevill's mother, Major A.P.B. Irwin paid this tribute -

He was one of the bravest men I have ever met, and was loved and trusted by his men to such a degree they would have followed him anywhere.

— Major A.P.B. Irwin, Billie. The Nevill Letters: 1914-1916

Nevill rests at Carnoy Military Cemetery (grave ref. E.28) under the care of the Commonwealth War Graves Commission.

== Press coverage ==
"Touchstone" of The Daily Mail penned the following verse in tribute:

On through the hail of slaughter,
Where gallant comrades fall,
Where blood is poured like water,
They drive the trickling ball.
The fear of death before them,
Is but an empty name;
True to the land that bore them,
The SURREYS played the game.

The Daily Telegraph of 12 July 1916 ran the headline, GALLANT EAST SURREYS. A CHARGE WITH FOOTBALLS and gave the following account -

The platoon commanders kicked off and the match against Death commenced... The gallant captain himself fell early in the charge, and men began to drop rapidly under the hail of machine-gun bullets. But still the footballs were booted on-wards, with hoarse cries of encouragement or defiance.

— The Daily Telegraph, 12 July 1916

== Relics ==
One of Neville's Somme footballs is currently displayed at the Princess of Wales's Royal Regiment Museum at Dover Castle. The other is believed lost after a fire the Queen's Royal Surrey Regimental Museum at Clandon Park, Guildford in 2015.
