= George Roupell =

British Army officer

Brigadier George Roupell VC CB DL
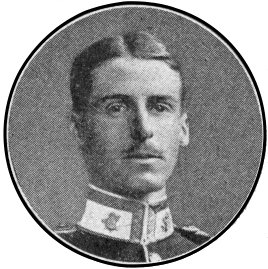
- Lieutenant Roupell from The War Illustrated, 10 July 1915
- Born: 7 April 1892; Tipperary, County Tipperary, Ireland
- Died: 4 March 1974 (aged 81); Shalford, Surrey, England
- Burial place: Guildford Crematorium, Surrey, England
- Military career
- Allegiance: United Kingdom
- Branch: British Army
- Service years: 1912–1946
- Rank: Brigadier
- Service number: 5360
- Units: East Surrey Regiment
- Commands: 114th Infantry Brigade (1943); 36th Infantry Brigade (1939–1940); 1st Battalion, East Surrey Regiment (1935–1939)
- Conflicts: First World War; Russian Civil War; Second World War
- Awards: Victoria Cross; Companion of the Order of the Bath; Mentioned in Despatches; Order of St George, 4th Class (Russia); Croix de Guerre (France)

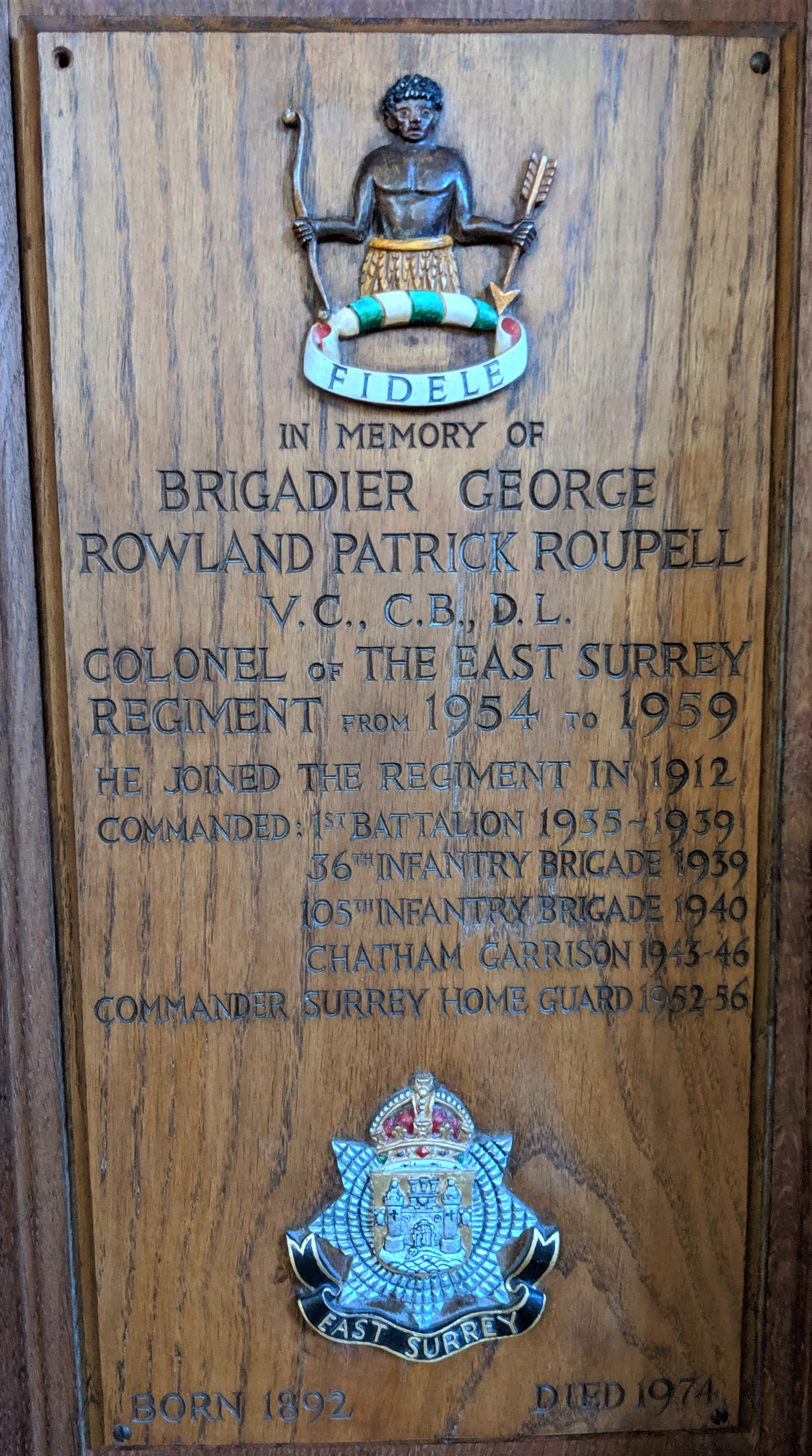
Plaque to Roupell in All Saints Church, Kingston upon Thames

Brigadier George Rowland Patrick Roupell, VC, CB, DL (7 April 1892 – 4 March 1974) was a senior officer in the British Army and a recipient of the Victoria Cross, the highest award for gallantry in the face of the enemy that can be awarded to British and Commonwealth forces.

== Early life and military career ==
George Roupell was born into a military family; his father, Francis Frederick Fyler Roupell, having served with the British Army in the 70th Regiment and commanded the 1st Battalion, East Surrey Regiment from 1895 to 1899, and was promoted to colonel in 1901. George's father had married Edith Maria Bryden at Kingston in 1887.

Roupell was educated at Repton School, Rossall School and the Royal Military College, Sandhurst. He was commissioned into the East Surrey Regiment, his father's regiment, on 2 March 1912 and was appointed a lieutenant on 29 April 1914, shortly before the outbreak of the First World War.

== First World War ==
At the outbreak of war in the summer of 1914, the 1st Battalion the East Surreys were deployed as part of the British Expeditionary Force (BEF) into northern Belgium. Roupell commanded a platoon in the BEF's first major action, the Battle of Mons, in August 1914. Roupell kept a diary throughout the war, which has since been a, sometimes humorous, source of insight and observation on the events that he witnessed and participated in. In the trenches at Mons he recounted how he had to hit his men on the backside with his sword in order to gain their attention and remind them to fire low as they had been taught.

Soon after, following the retreat from Mons in September 1914, Roupell led his platoon in the first Battle of the Aisne. Once again, he came under heavy fire, this time while crossing the Aisne on a raft. The Surreys' advance was pushed back with heavy casualties.

Early the following year, during the continued fighting around Ypres, Roupell was 23 years old when the following deed took place for which he was awarded the Victoria Cross (VC). His citation reads:

For most conspicuous gallantry and devotion to duty on 20 April 1915, when he was commanding a company of his battalion in a front trench on "Hill 60," which was subjected to a most severe bombardment throughout the day. Though wounded in several places, he remained at his post and led his company in repelling a strong German assault. During a lull in the bombardment he had his wounds hurriedly dressed, and then insisted in returning to his trench, which was again being subjected to severe bombardment. Towards evening, his company being dangerously weakened, he went back to his battalion headquarters, represented the situation to his commanding officer, and brought up reinforcements, passing backwards and forwards over ground swept by heavy fire. With these reinforcements he held his position throughout the night, and until his battalion was relieved next morning. This young officer was one of the few survivors of his company, and showed a magnificent example of courage, devotion and tenacity, which undoubtedly inspired his men to hold out till the end.

Roupell was presented with his VC by King George V on 12 July 1915. In addition to his Victoria Cross, he was awarded the Russian Order of St George (4th Class) and the French Croix de Guerre, and was Mentioned in Despatches. He was retrospectively appointed temporary captain with effect from 29 December 1914 to 20 April 1915, inclusive, and again later the same year.

Roupell was aboard TSS The Queen when it was captured and sunk in the English Channel in October 1916. He was appointed acting brigade major on 29 December 1917. On 9 May 1918, he was seconded to the general staff with the rank of temporary major.

== Inter-war ==
Following the end of hostilities in Europe, Roupell, still an acting major, was promoted to acting lieutenant colonel in charge of a battalion from December 1918 to March 1919. His appointment to the general staff was confirmed on 1 July 1919. During this time he was attached to the allied force under Edmund Ironside and sent to support Tsarist Russians as part of the Allied intervention in the Russian Civil War. On a visit to a Tsarist unit, they mutinied and Roupell and others were taken prisoner near Arkhangelsk, sent to Moscow, and finally repatriated in 1920.

Early in 1921, Roupell married Doris P. Sant in Paddington. Daughter Phoebe and son Peter were born in 1922 and 1925, respectively.

Roupell's inter-war military career continued with appointments as staff captain (1921), brigade major (1926), and promotion to substantive major (1928). During the inter-war period, Roupell served in Gibraltar, the Regimental Depot, India and the Sudan and he attended the Staff College, Camberley. As major (GSO2), Roupell spent two years from 1929 at the Royal Military College of Canada, and in 1934 a year with the British troops in China. Following his return, he was promoted to lieutenant colonel (1935).

== Second World War ==
At the outbreak of the Second World War, in September 1939, Roupell was promoted to colonel and, made an acting brigadier, placed in command of 36th Infantry Brigade from 7 October 1939. Roupell's brigade was deployed as part of the 12th (Eastern) Infantry Division in April 1940 and became part of the British Expeditionary Force (BEF), taking part in the Battle of France. The German thrust near the Somme river towards Abbeville eventually cut off the BEF, northern French and Belgian forces from the rest of France. Roupell's brigade headquarters near Doullens was attacked by enemy troops and on being told of the threat Roupell is reported to have exclaimed:

Never mind the Germans. I'm just going to finish my cup of tea.

When the brigade headquarters was overrun on 20 May 1940, Roupell gave the order for the survivors to split up into small groups and endeavour to re-contact Allied troops. Roupell, with a captain and French interpreter, avoided capture, hiding by day and walking at night for over a month. They arrived at a farm near Rouen where the two officers remained for almost two years, working as labourers. With the help of the French Resistance they were moved through unoccupied France into non-belligerent Spain, finally boarding ship in Gibraltar and returning to the United Kingdom.

Following his return he was appointed commanding officer of the 114th Infantry Brigade, part of the 38th (Welsh) Infantry Division, on 18 March 1943, a command he held until 2 November that year. The brigade was not destined to see battle, however, and he was soon appointed as garrison commander at Chatham, where he remained until retirement.

== Post-war ==
In 1946 Roupell was formally retired from the army on retirement pay and granted the honorary rank of brigadier, and, at the age of 58, excused from the reserve list of officers in 1950. He was appointed a deputy lieutenant of Surrey in 1953.

In 1954 Roupell was appointed Colonel of the East Surreys, succeeding Lieutenant General Arthur Dowler, and was to be the last Colonel of the East Surrey Regiment, relinquishing office in 1959 when amalgamation with the Queen's Royal Regiment (West Surrey) took place to form the Queen's Royal Surrey Regiment. He was appointed a Companion of the Order of the Bath in 1956.

George Roupell died in Shalford, Surrey, on 4 March 1974, at the age of 81. His body was cremated at Guildford Crematorium where his ashes were scattered.

== Bibliography ==
- Batchelor, Peter; Matson, Christopher (2011). The Western Front 1915. VCs of the First World War. Stroud, Gloucestershire: The History Press. ISBN 978-0-7524-6057-4.
- Buzzell, Nora, ed. (1997). The Register of the Victoria Cross. Cheltenham, Gloucestershire: This England Alma House. ISBN 0-906324-27-0.
- Oldfield, Paul (2014). Victoria Crosses on the Western Front August 1914–April 1915: Mons to Hill 60. Pen and Sword Books. ISBN 978-1783030439.

Honorary titles
Preceded by Sir Arthur Dowler	Colonel of the East Surrey Regiment; 1954–1959	Regiment consolidated to form the Queen's Royal Surrey Regiment
