= 36th Infantry Brigade (United Kingdom) =

36th Brigade 36th Infantry Brigade 36th Independent Infantry Brigade 36th Infantry Brigade
- Active: 1914–1919; 1939–1946
- Country: United Kingdom
- Branch: British Army
- Type: Infantry
- Size: Brigade
- Part of: 12th (Eastern) Division; 12th (Eastern) Infantry Division; 78th Infantry Division

Commanders
- Notable commanders: George Roupell

The 36th Infantry Brigade was an infantry brigade formation of British Army that fought in the First World War, as part of 12th (Eastern) Division, on the Western Front. The brigade also fought in the Second World War, with the 12th (Eastern) Infantry Division, in France, and later with 78th Infantry Division in Tunisia and Italy.

== First World War ==
The 36th Brigade fought throughout the First World War with the 12th (Eastern) Division on the Western Front. During the First World War the brigade was part of the New Army, also known as Kitchener's New Armies, and disbanded after the war ended.

=== Order of battle ===
- 8th (Service) Battalion, Royal Fusiliers (City of London Regiment) (disbanded February 1918)
- 9th (Service) Battalion, Royal Fusiliers (City of London Regiment)
- 7th (Service) Battalion, Royal Sussex Regiment
- 11th (Service) Battalion, Duke of Cambridge's Own (Middlesex Regiment) (disbanded February 1918)
- 36th Machine Gun Company, Machine Gun Corps (formed 1 February 1916, moved to 12th Battalion, Machine Gun Corps 1 March 1918)
- 36th Trench Mortar Battery (formed 15 June 1916)
- 5th (Service) Battalion, Princess Charlotte of Wales's (Royal Berkshire Regiment) (from February 1918)

== Second World War ==
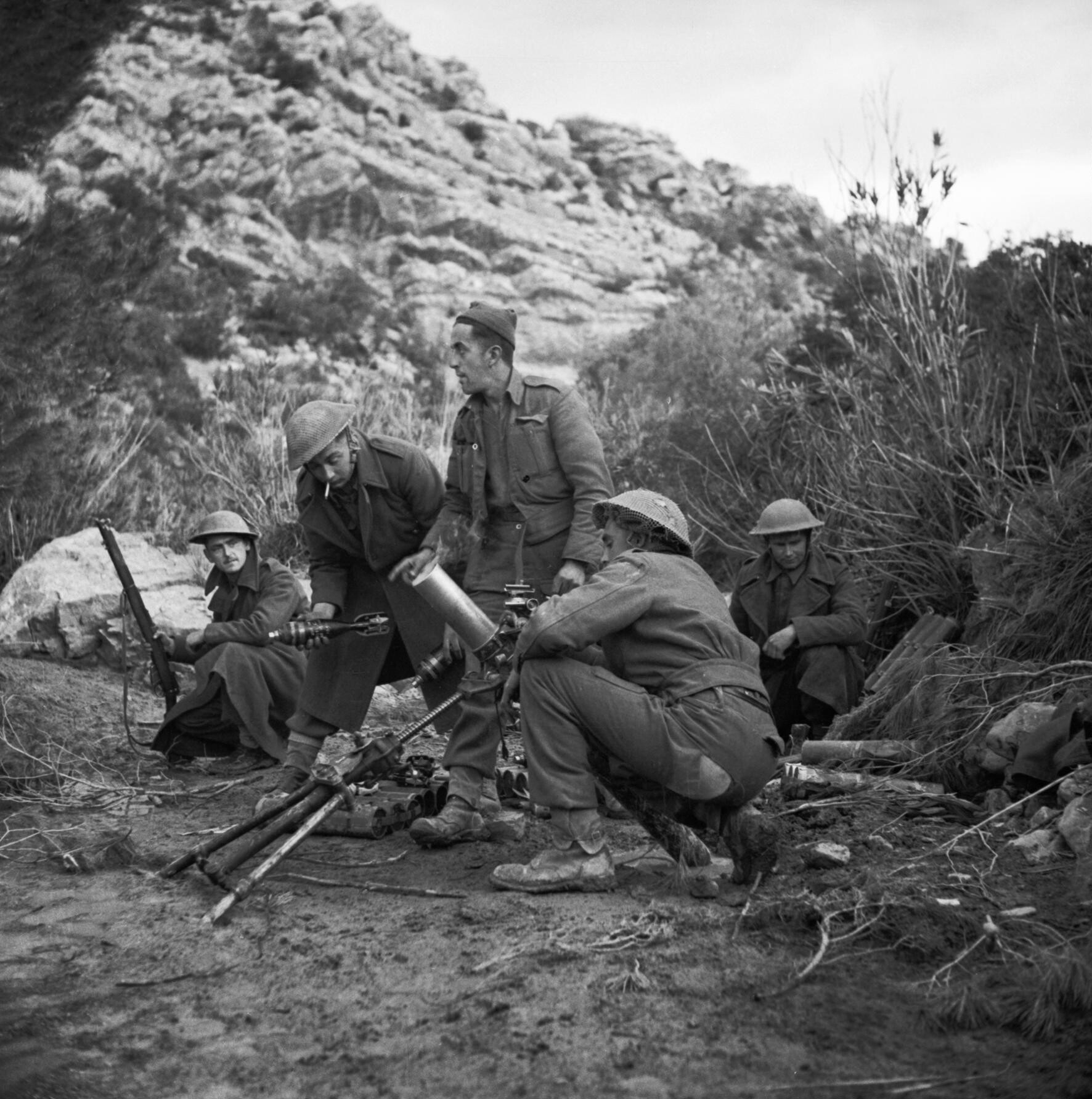
A 3-inch mortar crew of the 6th Battalion, Queen's Own Royal West Kent Regiment in action in Tunisia, 31 January 1943.

Reformed during the Second World War as the 36th Infantry Brigade on 7 October 1939, this time as part of the Territorial Army, and attached to the 12th (Eastern) Infantry Division, duplicate of the 44th (Home Counties) Infantry Division. The brigade was formed as a 2nd Line duplicate of the 132nd (Kent) Infantry Brigade. It fought in the Battle of France in May 1940 where it was overrun by the German Army and dispersed and suffered very heavy casualties, due mainly to the division having none of its support units and the infantrymen having had little training. Reformed in the United Kingdom, it was redesignated 36th Independent Infantry Brigade from 22 June 1940, when the 12th Division was disbanded, until 22 June 1942 when it was assigned to the 78th Battleaxe Infantry Division and served in the North African Campaign, in Operation Husky and the Italian Campaign, in particular the Battle of Monte Cassino and later Gothic Line, followed by the Spring 1945 offensive in Italy.

=== Order of battle ===
The 36th Infantry Brigade was constituted as follows during the war:

- 2/6th Battalion, East Surrey Regiment (left 26 October 1939)
- 6th Battalion, Queen's Own Royal West Kent Regiment
- 7th Battalion, Queen's Own Royal West Kent Regiment (until 20 August 1942)
- 5th Battalion, Buffs (Royal East Kent Regiment) (from 26 October 1939)
- 36th Infantry Brigade Anti-Tank Company (formed 18 August 1940, disbanded 20 June 1941)
- 8th Battalion, Argyll and Sutherland Highlanders (from 21 August 1942)
- 181st Field Ambulance, Royal Army Medical Corps (from 10 December 1941 until 22 June 1942)

=== Commanders ===
The following officers commanded the brigade during the war:

- Brigadier G.R.P. Roupell (until 20 May 1940, MIA)
- Brigadier A.L. Kent-Lemon (from 1 July 1940 until 17 December 1942)
- Brigadier B. Howlett (from 17 December 1942, KIA 29 November 1943)
- Lieutenant Colonel P.E.O. Bryan (Acting, from 30 November to 3 December 1943)
- Brigadier J.L. Spencer (from 3 December 1943 until 2 May 1944)
- Brigadier J.G. James (from 2 May 1944, KIA 16 June 1944)
- Brigadier C.D. Packard (from 27 June until 20 December 1944)
- Brigadier G.R.D. Musson (from 20 December 1944 until 7 June 1945)
- Lieutenant Colonel A.J. Odling-Smee (Acting, from 7 June until 11 July 1945)
- Brigadier G.R.D. Musson (from 11 July 1945)

== Recipients of the Victoria Cross ==
- Corporal George Jarratt, 8th (Service) Battalion, Royal Fusiliers, Great War
- Lieutenant Colonel Neville Elliott-Cooper, 8th (Service) Battalion, Royal Fusiliers, Great War

== Bibliography ==
- Joslen, H. F. (2003) [1960]. Orders of Battle: Second World War, 1939–1945. Uckfield, East Sussex: Naval and Military Press. ISBN 978-1-84342-474-1.
