= East Surrey Regiment =

- Insignia of the East Surrey Regiment
- Active: 1881–1959
- Country: United Kingdom
- Branch: British Army
- Type: Infantry
- Role: Line infantry
- Size: 1–2 Regular battalions 2 Militia and Special Reserve battalions 1–4 Territorial and Volunteer battalions Up to 12 Hostilities-only battalions
- Part of: Home Counties Brigade
- Garrison/HQ: The Barracks, Kingston upon Thames
- Nicknames: 1st Battalion: The Young Buffs; 2nd Battalion: The Glasgow Greys
- March: Quick: A Southerly Wind and a Cloudy Sky; Slow: Lord Charles Montague's The Huntingdonshire March
- Anniversaries: Sobraon (10 February); Ypres (23 April)
- Engagements: Suakin Expedition 1885; Second Boer War; World War I World War II

The East Surrey Regiment was a line infantry regiment of the British Army in existence from 1881 until 1959. The regiment was formed in 1881 under the Childers Reforms by the amalgamation of the 31st (Huntingdonshire) Regiment of Foot, the 70th (Surrey) Regiment of Foot, the 1st Royal Surrey Militia and the 3rd Royal Surrey Militia.

In 1959, after service in the Second Boer War and both World War I and World War II, the East Surrey Regiment was amalgamated with the Queen's Royal Regiment (West Surrey) to form the Queen's Royal Surrey Regiment, which was, in 1966, merged with the Queen's Own Buffs, The Royal Kent Regiment, the Royal Sussex Regiment and the Middlesex Regiment (Duke of Cambridge's Own) to form the Queen's Regiment. The Queen's Regiment was subsequently amalgamated with the Royal Hampshire Regiment to form the present Princess of Wales's Royal Regiment (Queen's and Royal Hampshires).

== History ==
=== Early history ===
In 1702 a regiment of marines was raised in the West Country by George Villier (not related to the Villiers that became the Duke of Buckingham). It was named Villier's Marines. Villier was drowned in 1703, and the regiment was taken over by Alexander Luttrell. After Luttrell's death in 1705, the command went to Joshua Churchill until 1711 when it became Goring's Regiment (at this time regiments took the name of their colonel).

In 1715 the regiment was removed from the marines and became the 31st Regiment of Infantry, and in 1751 the designation was changed to the 31st Regiment of Foot. Five years later a second battalion was raised in Scotland, the 2/31st Foot, which was re-designated in 1758, the 70th Regiment of Foot (Glasgow Lowland Regiment).

Further changes were made in 1782. The 31st became known as the 31st (Huntingdonshire) Regiment of Foot, while the 70th became the 70th (Surrey) Regiment of Foot. They stayed with these titles until 1881 when they became the 1st & 2nd battalions of the East Surrey Regiment.

=== 1881 to 1914 ===
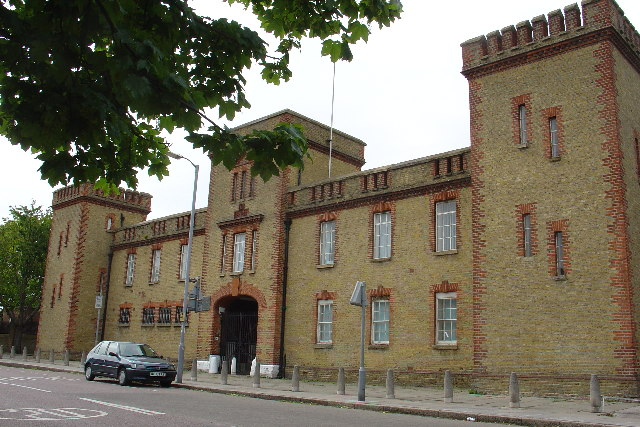
The Barracks, Kingston upon Thames

Following amalgamation, The Barracks, Kingston upon Thames became the regimental depot.

The 1st Battalion, on formation, was in England, moving to India in 1884. It remained in India until 1903, its last posting being at Lucknow. It was then recalled to England and was posted at Aldershot, before moving to Jersey in 1905 and to Plymouth in 1909.

The 2nd Battalion was in India when formed, moving to Suez in 1884. It then joined the Suakin Expedition in the Sudan in February 1885, where it saw fighting against the forces of the Mahdist State. The battalion left Suakin when the expedition was withdrawn in May 1885, returning to England. The battalion's next overseas service was in the Second Boer War in South Africa, where it took part in the Battle of Colenso in December 1899, the Relief of Ladysmith in February 1900, and the Battle of the Tugela Heights in February 1900. After the end of the war in South Africa, the battalion was shipped from Point Natal to Bombay on the SS Syria in January 1903, where it replaced the 1st battalion at Lucknow. The battalion remained in India until the outbreak of the First World War.

The 3rd (Militia) Battalion, which was formed from the 1st Royal Surrey Militia in 1881, was a reserve battalion. It was embodied for service during the Second Boer War in South Africa on 3 May 1900, disembodied on 15 October 1900, re-embodied on 6 May 1901 and disembodied on 26 July 1902. More than 600 officers and men returned to Southampton by the SS Gaika in July 1902, following the end of the war, and was disbanded at Kingston barracks after having received their service medals.

The 4th (Militia) Battalion, formed from the 3rd Royal Surrey Militia in 1881 was also a reserve battalion. It was embodied for service on 4 December 1899, disembodied on 12 July 1901, and re-embodied again for service during Second Boer War in South Africa. Eight hundred and fifty officers and men returned to Southampton by the SS Tagus in October 1902, following the end of the war, and was disbanded at the Kingston barracks.

Under the 1881 reforms the regiment was also assigned four Volunteer Battalions:

The 1st Surrey Rifles was based at Camberwell; it did not change its title when affiliated to the East Surreys, and in 1908 it became the 21st (County of London) Battalion in the London Regiment.

The 3rd Surrey Rifle Volunteers at Wimbledon became the 2nd Volunteer Battalion and adopted that as its title in 1887.

The 5th Surrey Rifle Volunteers at Kingston became the 3rd Volunteer Battalion and was also redesignated in 1887.

The 7th Surrey Rifle Volunteers at Southwark became the 4th Volunteer Battalion at Clapham Junction, it later became 23rd (County of London) Battalion, London Regiment.

In 1908, the Volunteers and Militia were reorganised nationally, with the former becoming the Territorial Force and the latter the Special Reserve; the regiment now had two Special Reserve and two Territorial battalions: the 3rd (Reserve) Battalion and the 4th (Extra Reserve) Battalion, both at Kingston Barracks, with the 5th Battalion (TF) at St George's Road in Wimbledon (since demolished) and the 6th Battalion (TF) at Orchard Road in Kingston upon Thames (since demolished).

=== First World War ===
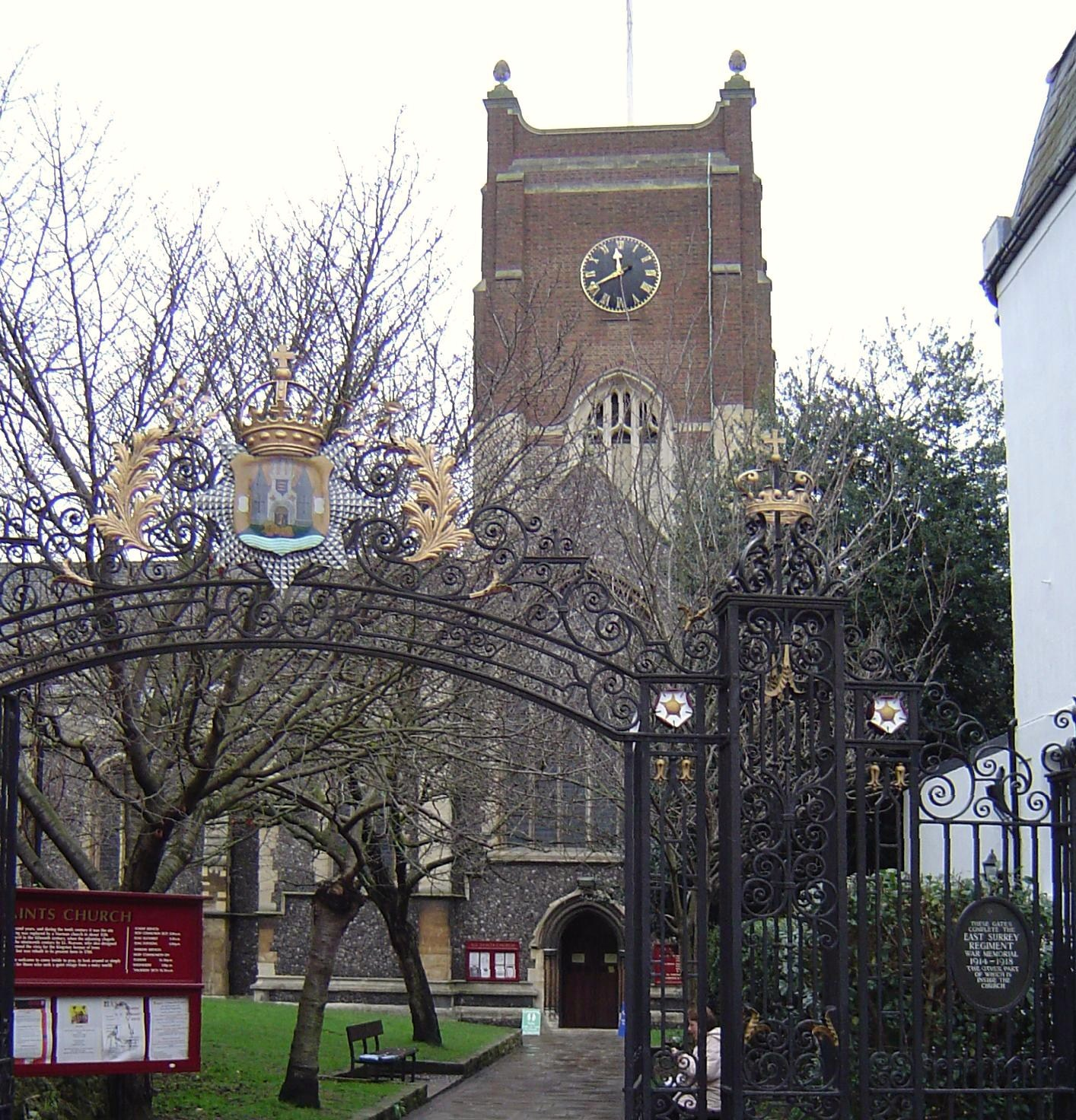
East Surrey Regiment Memorial Gateway to All Saints Church, Kingston upon Thames

==== Regular Army ====
On 4 August 1914, the 1st Battalion, East Surrey Regiment was in Dublin. Eleven days later, mobilization completed and at full war establishment, the 1st Battalion landed at Le Havre in France, and before the end of the month was in action against the Germans. The battalion was assigned to the 14th Brigade, 5th Division, part of the original British Expeditionary Force (BEF). During the Retreat from Mons and afterwards, the battalion took part in the great battles of 1914, Le Cateau, the Marne and the Aisne. In 1915, after the Battle of La Bassée, the 1st East Surreys withstood a most determined attack on Hill 60, near Ypres. In the desperate fighting which ensued, the battalion won three Victoria Crosses and seven Distinguished Conduct Medals. Among the VCs was Lieutenant George Roupell, who later became the last Colonel of the East Surrey Regiment. On 30 December 1915, the 14th Brigade was transferred to the 32nd Division, shortly before the 1st Battalion was transferred to the 95th Brigade, 5th Division, on 12 January 1916. In 1916, the 1st Battalion took part in the great battles of the River Somme, and distinguished itself notably at Morval in September. The battalion took part in many of the great battles of 1917, such as Arras, the Third Battle of Ypres. After a four-month tour on the Italian Front, the battalion was back in France in March 1918, and was engaged in the Battles of Albert and Bapaume, and the subsequent advance to victory.

The 2nd Battalion returned from India at the outbreak of war, but it was not until January 1915 that it arrived in France with the 85th Brigade, 28th Division. It was soon in action to the south of Ypres where it lost many men, some by poison gas: the battalion lost some 800 troops out of about 1,000. The 2nd Battalion took part in the Battle of Loos in September 1915, and fought valiantly in the defence of the Hohenzollern Redoubt. At a vital stage in this battle, Lieutenant Arthur Fleming-Sandes, though wounded, displayed exceptional courage and leadership, for which he was later awarded the Victoria Cross. The following month the battalion was transferred to the Salonika Expeditionary Force, and spent the remainder of the War on the Struma Valley Front and east of Lake Doiran. The battalion saw action at the Battle of Doiran in January 1918.

==== Special Reserve ====
The 3rd (Reserve) and 4th (Extra Reserve) Battalions remained in England with the dual role of home defence and of training and preparing reinforcement drafts of reservists, special reservists, recruits and returning wounded for the regular battalions.

==== Territorial Force ====
The 1/5th and 1/6th Battalions, East Surrey Regiment were not to see service on the Western Front. Both battalions were part of the Surrey Brigade, alongside the 4th and 5th West Surreys, and attached to the Home Counties Division. They embarked for India in October 1914 and were employed on garrison duties in the United Provinces and the Punjab for two years. The 1/5th Battalion then joined the Mesopotamian Expeditionary Force in December 1917 and took part in the operations on the Tigris, while the 1/6th Battalion left India in February 1917 for a twelve-month tour of duty with the Aden Field Force.

==== Hostilities-only battalions ====
After the outbreak of war the East surreys formed nine 'New Army' or 'Kitchener's Army' battalions: The 7th (Service) Battalion landed at Boulogne-sur-Mer as part of the 37th Brigade in the 12th (Eastern) Division in June 1915 for service on the Western Front. The battalion fought at the battles of Loos, the Somme, Albert and Arras.

The 8th (Service) Battalion landed at Boulogne-sur-Mer as part of the 55th Brigade in the 18th (Eastern) Division in July 1915 also for service on the Western Front. The battalion fought at the Battle of Loos and the Battle of the Somme. One particular incident will always be remembered. On the first day of the Battle of the Somme, 1 July 1916, B Company of the 8th Battalion went into the attack dribbling two footballs which the company commander, Captain Wilfred Nevill, had bought for his platoons to kick across no man's land. Captain Nevill and many of his men were killed during the advance, but the 8th East Surreys were one of the few battalions to reach and hold their objective on this day. The "Football Attack" caught the imagination of the country, and illustrations of it are shown in the Regimental Museum, which also contains one of the footballs used. On that day, the 8th Battalion won two DSOs, two MCs, two DCMs and nine MMs, but 446 officers and men were killed or wounded.

The 9th (Service) Battalion landed at Boulogne-sur-Mer as part of the 72nd Brigade in the 24th Division in September 1915 also for service on the Western Front. The battalion saw action at the Battle of the Somme.

The 10th and 11th Battalions were formed as service battalions but converted to reserve battalions, training and preparing reinforcement drafts for the battalions overseas.

When the regimental depots were overwhelmed by volunteers, so-called 'Pals battalions' were formed by mayors and corporations up and down the country; the East Surreys were assigned two of these:

The 12th (Service) Battalion (Bermondsey) landed at Le Havre as part of the 122nd Brigade in the 41st Division in May 1916 also for service on the Western Front. The battalion saw action at the Battle of the Somme, the Battle of Messines and the Third Battle of Ypres.

The 13th (Service) Battalion (Wandsworth) landed at Le Havre as part of the 120th Brigade in the 40th Division in June 1916 also for service on the Western Front. The battalion saw action at the Battle of the Somme, the Battle of Cambrai and the Battle of Arras.

The 14th (Reserve) Battalion was formed at Wimbledon in 1915 to supply reinforcements to the 12th and 13th battalions.

A short-lived 15th (Service) Battalion was formed in 1918, and was used to reconstitute the shattered 13th (Wandsworth) Battalion.

=== 1919 to 1939 ===
Between August and October 1919 the First Battalion were in the Murmansk area of North Russia to help cover the evacuation of the expedition sent to support the White Russian forces against the Bolsheviks. On their return, they served in Ireland in 1920 during the troubles. They were then abroad for the next 18 years, serving in Egypt, Hong Kong, the Sudan and India. Returning to the Sudan in 1938, forty members of the battalion were employed as extras in the filming of The Four Feathers, set during the reconquest of the Sudan in 1898. The 1st Battalion returned to England in February 1939.

In 1920, the 2nd Battalion served in Egypt and Turkey, then Ireland, returning to England in 1921. Apart from a posting at Gibraltar, the 2nd Battalion remained at home until September 1938, when they moved to Shanghai.

The service and Territorial battalions were disbanded after the First World War but in 1920 the 5th and 6th Battalions of the East Surreys were re-formed. In 1938 the 5th Battalion was converted to an Anti-Tank Regiment to form the 57th (East Surrey) Anti-Tank Regiment, Royal Artillery (TA), with headquarters at Wimbledon. In 1939 a duplicate unit was formed as the 67th Anti-Tank Regiment, Royal Artillery (TA), with headquarters at Sutton.

The 6th Battalion comprised five companies based at drill halls with A Company at Chertsey, B and C at Park Road, Richmond, D at Orchard Road, Kingston and HQ at Surbiton. By the summer of 1939 the 6th battalion, commanded by Lt Col M.D.Hicks since 1936, numbered over 1,200.

=== Second World War ===
==== The 1st Battalion ====
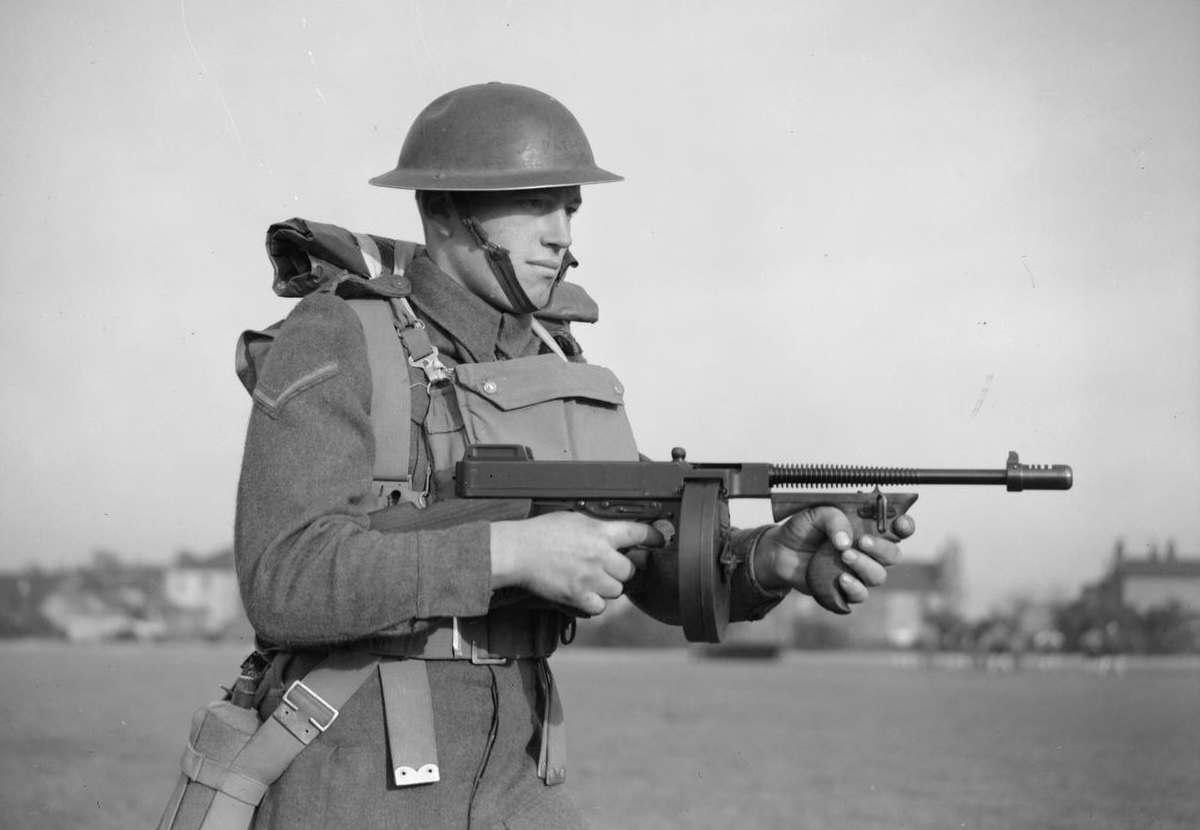
A soldier of the East Surrey Regiment, pictured here equipped with a Thompson m1928 submachine gun (drum magazine), 25 November 1940

The 1st Battalion, East Surrey Regiment was a Regular Army unit based in England at the outbreak of World War II in September 1939. The battalion was part of the 11th Infantry Brigade, which also included the 2nd Battalion, Lancashire Fusiliers and 1st Battalion, Ox and Bucks Light Infantry, and was attached to the 4th Infantry Division and was sent to France with the British Expeditionary Force (BEF) in October. After returning to the United Kingdom after the Battle of Dunkirk and evacuation from Dunkirk in May–June 1940 the 1st Battalion was re-formed and spent the next two years on home defence expecting a German invasion. In June 1942 the battalion was reassigned, with the rest of the 11th Brigade, part of the newly raised 78th Infantry Division (nicknamed the battleaxe division), with which it remained for the rest of the war. It took part in Operation Torch in November 1942, landing in North Africa at Algiers with the British First Army. Following this the battalion fought with the division in Tunisia until the end of the Tunisian Campaign in May 1943. During this time it took part in notable actions such as Ochsenkopf offensive, Longstop Hill and Tebourba.

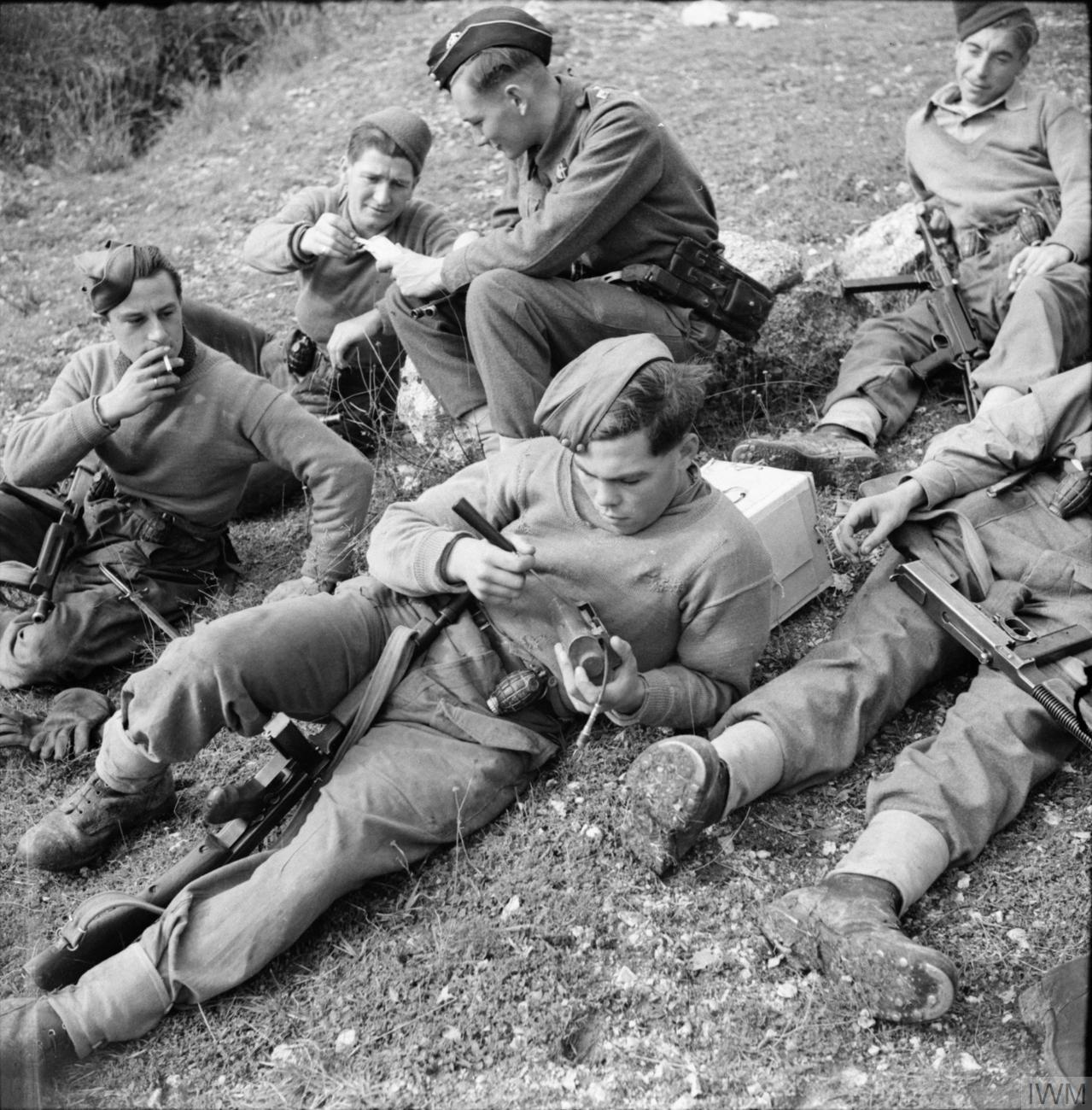
A battle patrol of the 1st Battalion, East Surrey Regiment rest after returning from enemy territory, 16 December 1943. They are armed with Thompson SMGs, grenades and a captured German MP 40.

After North Africa the British First Army was disbanded and 78th Division became part of the British Eighth Army. The battalion then fought in Sicily during the invasion before moving to Italy for the Italian campaign where it had notable involvement in the Battle of Termoli and the fighting on the Barbara Line and River Sangro during the autumn of 1943. In February 1944 78th Division was switched to the Cassino sector. The battalion initially held positions on the River Rapido south of Cassino but by March had been moved into bleak and exposed positions in the mountains north of the town. In late April they were relieved and after a brief rest took part in the fourth and final battle of Monte Cassino in May 1944. They were then involved in the pursuit after the Allied breakthrough. They fought a hard engagement at Lake Trasimeno on the Trasimene Line in June 1944 before being withdrawn with the rest of the division in July to Egypt for rest and training.

The 1st East Surreys returned with 78th Division to Italy in September 1944 in time to take part in Operation Olive and the fighting in the Apennine Mountains during the winter of 1944 and occupying positions on Monte Spaduro when the front became static. In February 1945 the battalion came out of the front line to prepare and train for the offensive planned for the spring. By late March the whole division was in place on the banks of the Senio river ready for the start of the spring 1945 offensive which started on 6 April. The battalion fought in the intense action at the Argenta Gap before advancing with the rest of the division to the north of the Gulf of Venice and crossing the Italian border to finish the war in Austria.

==== The 2nd Battalion ====
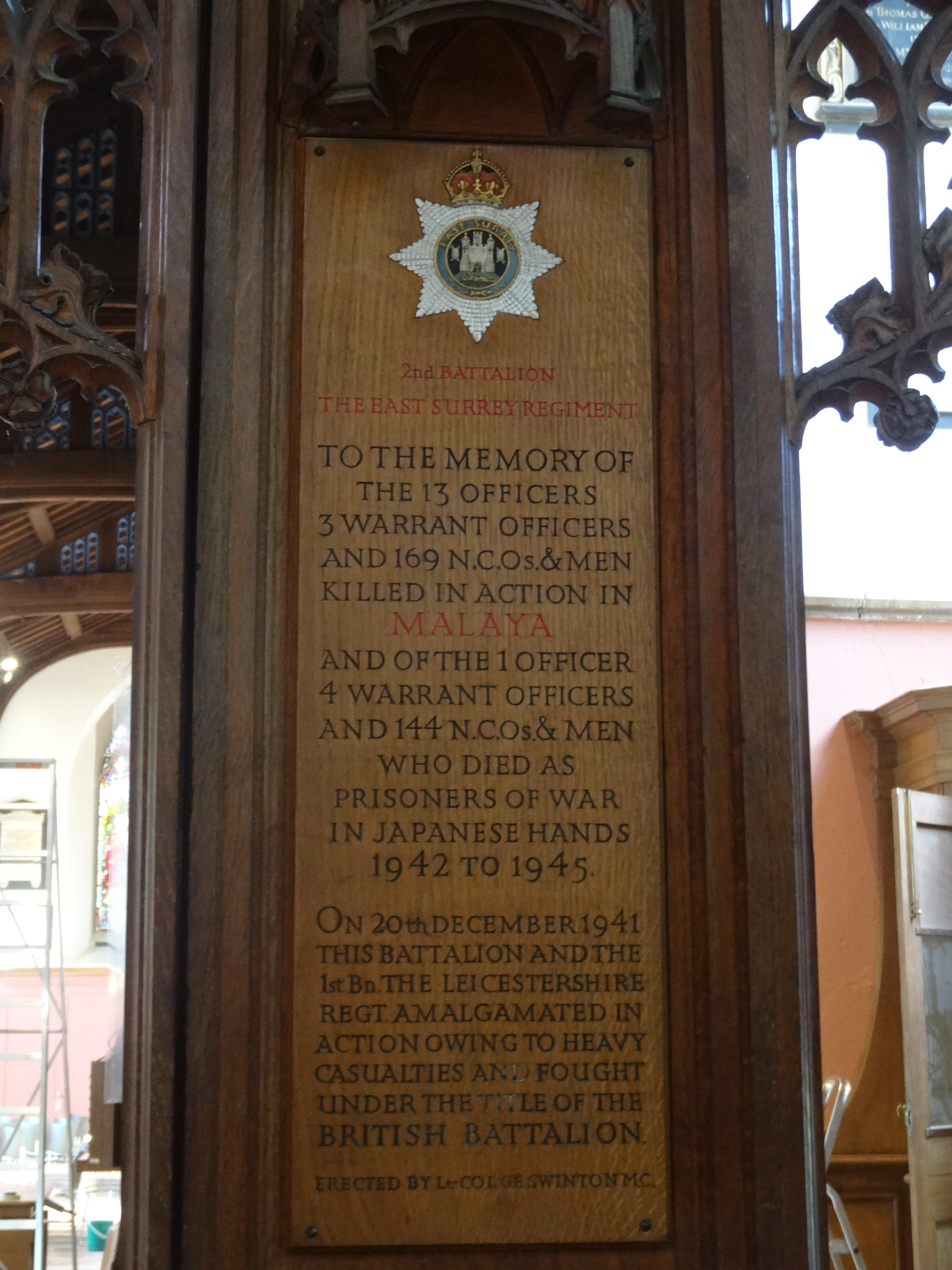
Memorial in All Saints, Kingston to the 2nd Battalion, East Surrey Regiment and the men it lost in the Malayan campaign and as prisoners afterwards

In September 1938 the 2nd Battalion was moved from Colchester to the British Concession of the International Settlement in Shanghai. In August 1940 the battalion was posted from China to Malaya where it was attached to 11th Indian Infantry Division based in North West Malaya. In December 1941 the Japanese Army invaded Malaya after landing in southern Thailand. The 2nd East Surreys suffered tremendous casualties during the defence and retreat from this part of Malaya. The battalion was amalgamated with the 1st Battalion, Leicestershire Regiment (in 1946 re-titled Royal Leicestershire Regiment) to form the British Battalion (Malaya 1941) on 19 December 1941. This unit fought gallantly throughout the rest of the short campaign until the surrender of the British Army at Singapore in February 1942.

In May 1942 the 2nd Battalion was reformed in the United Kingdom from the re-designation of the 11th Battalion, a hostilities-only battalion raised in 1940 that joined the 184th Infantry Brigade, 61st Division. It did not see further action in World War II.

==== Territorial Battalions ====
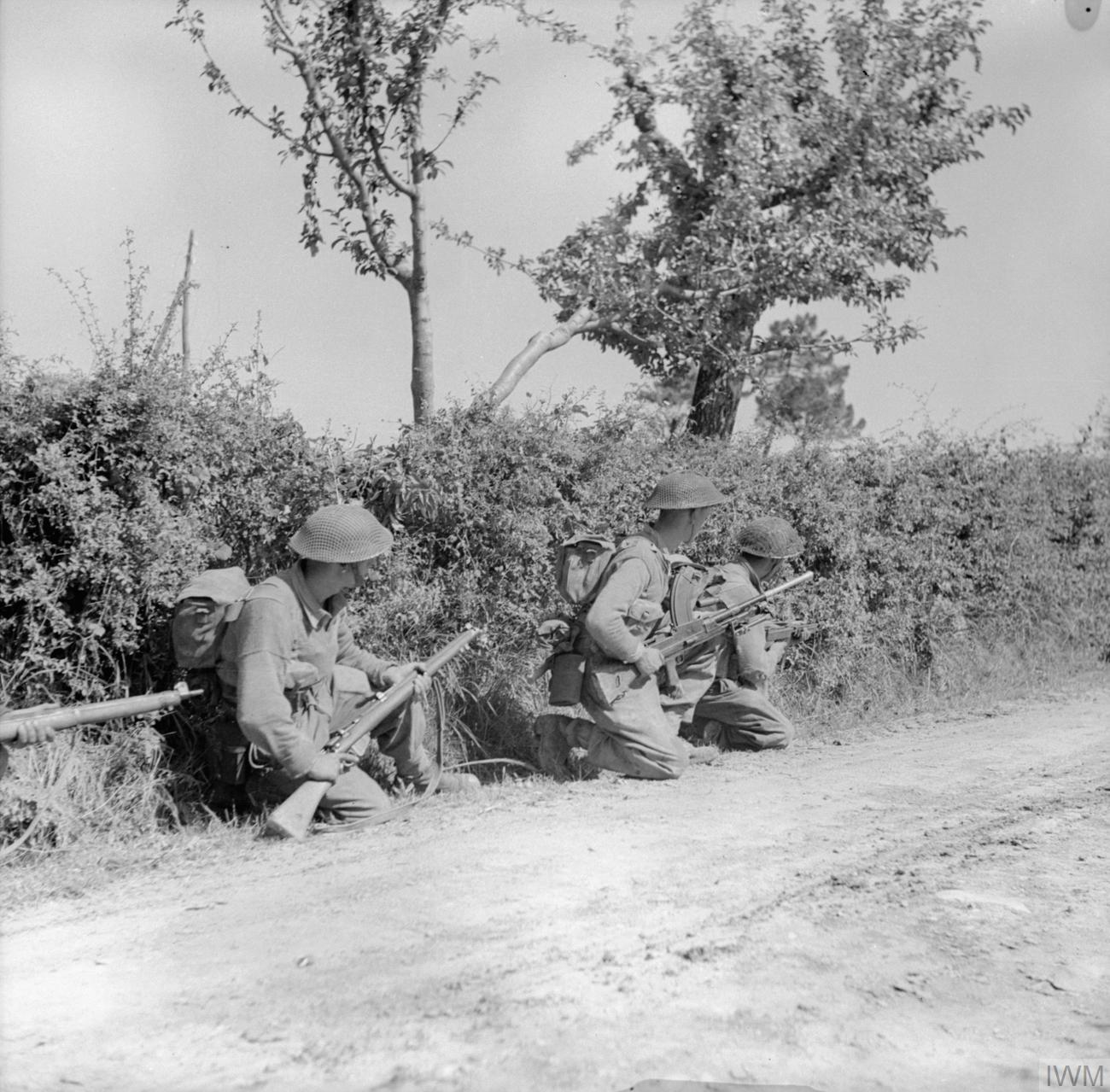
Men of the 1/6th Battalion, East Surrey Regiment crouch beside a hedge during fighting near Gioiella, Italy, 29 June 1944.

The 6th Battalion, East Surrey Regiment was a Territorial Army (TA) unit until 1939, when each unit was ordered to form a 2nd Line duplicate. It was therefore split in two with Kingston and Hersham companies and the Band used to form the 1/6th and the Chertsey and Richmond companies and the Drums to form the 2/6th. Both were embodied on 24 August 1939 whilst at camp in Lympne and were fully mobilised and guarding vulnerable points at the outbreak of war on 3 September.

A further five other, hostilities-only, territorial battalions were formed in 1940: the 8th, 9th, 10th, the 50th (Holding) and the 70th (Young Soldiers) Battalions. An army camp was established in Richmond Park to add capacity to the Regimental Depot at Kingston in its role as an Infantry Training Centre. It operated there from early 1940 until August 1941 when the ITC transferred to Canterbury, a facility shared with the Buffs.

The 1/6th was initially commanded by Lt Col Hicks until he transferred out in December 1939 to be replaced by Lt Col F O Voisin. A draft transferred in from the 1st Battalion whilst soldiers under 20 years of age were transferred out to the 2/6th. After a period of intense training at Lyme Regis the battalion of 28 officers and 643 other ranks embarked for France from Southampton on 5 April 1940 arriving at Cherbourg.

The 1/6th were deployed with the 132nd Infantry Brigade, part of the 44th (Home Counties) Infantry Division, becoming part of the British Expeditionary Force (BEF). They billeted at Conlie then travelled by road, train and a long march to Bailleul on the Belgian border. During the journey, Voisin was posted elsewhere and command was transferred to Lt Col, later Brigadier, C D Armstrong, formerly with the 1st Battalion. The battalion was exchanged in 132nd Brigade for the 1st Battalion, Queen's Own Royal West Kent Regiment, making that brigade an all-West Kent formation, and the 1/6th transferred to the 10th Infantry Brigade, 4th Infantry Division, as part of official BEF policy to integrate the Regular and Territorial Armies.

By 15 May the battalion were moved to positions on the River Dyle, coming under attack from the air on the way as they reached the River Senne to the north-east of Brussels. When it became clear the line would not hold, 10 Brigade were ordered to withdraw behind the River Dendre. By 19 May they were in position at Avelghem on the River Escaut defending and eventually overseeing the destruction of the bridge at Rugge and subsequently conducting patrols in the area until withdrawn, on 19 May, just north of the town. On 21 May they relieved 2 DCLI and continued excursions at Rugge suffering many casualties and some fatalities. Ordered to withdraw to Neuville-en-Ferrain, they marched overnight, re-entering France at Mouscron, taking up positions near the border early on 23 May.

Three days of fighting in the Risquons-Tout area followed with the 1/6 suffering five of the fifteen related fatalities and many casualties. Ordered to withdraw on 27 May, they marched 10 miles (16 km) and re-captured the village of Voormezele with further casualties. The following evening they marched overnight towards Dunkirk. After resting at Poperinghe they were transported to Furnes where they were quickly deployed to help defend the canal to the east of Nieuport. Fighting over the next few days was fierce with the battalion also coming under fire from aircraft and an observation balloon. On 31 May they were joined by the 1st Battalion and fought side by side into the night when 1/6 were ordered to withdraw. They reached the beach at La Panne but on learning that no further boats would be landing there moved into Dunkirk. Despite coming under fire again they mostly managed to remain together and were amongst the last to be evacuated.

Armstrong remained in command until April 1942 when he was posted to command the 70th (Young Soldiers) Battalion. Lt Col H.A.B. Bruno took command in April 1942 and led the battalion in action in North Africa in March, but was killed in action during the attack on Djebel Djaffa in April. He was succeeded by Lt Col R O V Thompson, who had served with the 1st and 2nd Battalions before the war, appointed from a posting in the RAF to command the 1/6th for the final phase of the Tunisian Campaign. He subsequently led the battalion into action in Italy in the crossing of the River Rapido and the capture of Cassino. He, too was killed in action when his Jeep was blown up by a mine near Tivoli on 7 June 1944. Colonel C G S McAlester took command until February 1945. For the final months of the war, until August 1945, the battalion was led by Lt Col A G H Culverhouse, who had previously served with the 1/6th and had been wounded at Dunkirk.

The 2/6th Battalion was formed in 1939 under the command of Lt. Col. H.S. Burgess. The battalion was assigned to the 37th Infantry Brigade, alongside the 6th and 7th Royal Sussex, part of 12th (Eastern) Infantry Division. All soldiers under 20 years of age in 37 Brigade were assigned to a composite company based at 'Courtlands', West Worthing where they were engaged in coastal defence. The rest of the battalion were deployed as part of the BEF and a force of 23 officers and 603 other ranks sailed from Southampton, arriving in and stationed at Le Havre from 22 April 1940. Initially intended as a line of communications unit and expected to undertake further training they almost immediately became involved in the Battle of France and the defence of the Channel ports. On 15 May they were reassigned as motorised infantry, incorporated into Beauforce and sent north to join the rest of the BEF. With their route blocked by the Battle of Abbeville, they were ordered to take up a defensive position west of the River Béthune between Saint-Aubin-le-Cauf and Arques-la-Bataille and undertake patrols as part of the support group for the 1st Armoured Division. Here they were rejoined by D Company from detachment at Fécamp and remained until relieved by a battalion of Sherwood Foresters. After a few days' rest at Rouen, where Major D G Adams assumed command on 3 June, they were assigned to provide flank and rear-guard cover for the 51st (Highland) Infantry Division and ordered to hold a line east of the River Bresle between Forges-les-Eaux and Aumale, relieving the 4th Borders protecting anti-tank guns of the 1st Armoured Division. Lightly armed and spread very thinly, they were over-run in places by the rapidly advancing 7th Panzer Division. On 8 June they were ordered to withdraw north to the Eu Forest. They then proceeded via the Eawy Forest, skirting Bellencombre which had fallen, reaching Beaunay on 10 June, Cailleville on 11th and into Saint-Valery-en-Caux joining with the 51st Highland Division defences and anticipated Operation Cycle evacuation. Finally, surrounded and unable to escape, the division and supporting troops were forced to surrender to Rommel on 12 June 1940. Fifteen officers and 251 other ranks of the 2/6th were taken prisoners of war including commanding officer Major D G Adams. About 120 of the 2/6th were able to escape via the evacuations from nearby Veules-les-Roses and a small number, separated from the main battalion, escaped to the west via Saint Nazaire and other ports. The captured troops were force-marched through France and Belgium to the Rhine in Holland, then taken by barge and rail to imprisonment in Poland at Stalag XX-A, XX-B and XX1-D. After St. Valery, the remainder of the battalion reassembled at Haltwhistle, Northumberland, where they were re-joined by the young contingent from 'Courtlands'. The battalion was reformed under Norman Brading at Swaffham, Norfolk, but did not see further active service, spending the remainder of the war principally as a defence and training battalion. During the Battle of Britain they were deployed to home defence duties including airfield defence in Norfolk and, after winter in Bedford, coastal defence at Kessingland as part of the 11th Division. Winter 1941 was spent at Henley-on-Thames after which they returned to Norfolk, this time at Thetford in June 1942. They moved to Durham in August, remaining there for seven months during which time Brading accepted a posting to be replaced briefly by W. M. Knatchbull until succeeded by D.C. Campbell-Miles MBE in September. In March 1943 they moved to Malton, North Yorkshire followed by Uckfield from 4 July where P.H. Macklin took command. In early October they returned to Norfolk, this time to Hunstanton where they participated in Exercise Sugar Beet, helping with the sugar beet harvest. In January 1944 they moved back to Durham for three weeks and then to Felton, Northumberland where it became clear that the battalion would not see action in the Invasion of France as 270 men were transferred out to units of 21 Army Group in April. Instead the battalion was sent to East Hornsey to organise and man a marshalling sub-area until July. It then moved to Lowestoft under command of D.C. Coates and was dedicated as a training battalion, taking drafts of new recruits, putting them through basic training prior to being sent to Europe as reinforcements. Still in this role, the battalion moved again to Shorncliffe at the end of September 1944 and Whittlesford 15 November 1944. J.G.M.G Gough took command in January 1945 and was succeeded by R.W.M. Wetherell in September 1945. The battalion was placed in 'suspended animation' on 28 July 1946.

==== Hostilities-only battalions ====
Unlike the first World War, the hostilities-only battalions raised during World War II were all territorials and deployed on home defence duties. The 8th Battalion was raised at Rochester, Kent in March 1940 and, after moving to nearby Aylesford in August, transferred its young soldiers out to form the 70th in October 1940. On 27 August the following year the 8th merged with and was absorbed by the similarly affected 8th Royal West Kent Regiment and ceased to exist as a separate entity. The 70th, comprising six companies, spent the winter of 1940–41 on airfield guard duties based at Gravesend, at Capel Beare Green the following summer and Byfleet from October 1941 to July 1942. They then went to a camp at Charlton but the battalion, along with sixteen other Young Soldiers Battalions, was disbanded by the end of August 1942.

The 9th Battalion was formed at Romford in May 1940 guarding vulnerable points until July when, as part of Brocforce, it guarded a 14-mile (23 km) stretch of coast at Climping until October. It was then sent to Northern Ireland, initially guarding the naval base at Derry and new bomber airfield at Limavady. It finally moved to Belfast in early February 1943 where it remained until disbanded in June 1943.

The 10th Battalion was formed at Kingston on 4 July 1940 comprising seven officers and about 150 men. In a few days it moved to a camp at Ilfracombe where its numbers were increased by about 800 new recruits all immediately engaged on guard duties. The 10th remained in Devon, in and around Plymouth until moving to Helston, Cornwall, in June 1941 and Tiverton, Devon in July. Here they were able to train with 48th Division until returning to coastal defence at Crownhill, Devonport from August 1941 until undertaking more divisional training at Whitchurch Down, Devon, in June 1942 before returning to Crownhill. They moved to Dovercourt, Essex in January 1943 joining 45th Division for three weeks before being deployed to Cookstown and Portglenone in Northern Ireland until returning to England at the end of the year at Hassocks, West Sussex. During this period many men were transferred out for service in the Middle East and in 21st Army Group. The 10th's final task was to prepare and run a camp marshalling sub-area in Hambledon, Hampshire, for Operation Overlord until disbanded in August 1944.

The 50th (Holding) Battalion was formed in early June 1940 at Dover with about 400 NCOs and men from the ITC at Kingston from which, almost immediately, 300 were transferred to the 1st Battalion to be replaced by about 600 new recruits. Their principal activity was building and manning coastal defences during which time they faced bombardment by guns from across the Channel and by air. In July the 50th moved to Dorking, ceased to be a Holding Battalion and was renumbered as the 11th Battalion. After providing mobile aerodrome defences in September, they joined 219th Independent Infantry Brigade in November and returned to Dover in February 1941. In May 1942 the 11th was chosen to replace the 2nd Battalion, lost at the fall of Singapore, the formal ceremony taking place on 16 June 1942.

==== Home Guard ====
From the formation of the Local Defence Volunteer (Home Guard) on 14 May 1940 until stood down on 6 September 1944 over 55,000 men served in twelve Surrey and four County of London battalions associated with the East Surrey Regiment, suffering a total of 538 casualties and few fatalities.

=== Post 1945 and amalgamation ===
At the end of 1945 the 2nd Battalion moved from England to Egypt, before moving to Palestine, where it helped counter the Jewish insurgency in Mandatory Palestine. After the British evacuation of Palestine, the 2nd battalion saw garrison duty in the Suez Canal Zone, before a final posting to Greece, where in 1948 it was disbanded, its personnel joining the 1st Battalion.

In January 1946, the 1st Battalion moved from Austria to Greece, it combatting Communist guerrillas in Salonica. After amalgamation with the 2nd Battalion, it moved to Somaliland in 1949, before returning to England in 1950. In 1951 the battalion moved to Libya, then Egypt to aid policing duties to protect the Canal Zone until October 1954. After a tour of Duty in the BAOR in Germany between 1955 and 1958, and a three-month posting to Nicosia on internal security operations during the Cyprus Emergency, the 1st Battalion returned to England in December 1958. Here, in October 1959, the East Surrey Regiment was amalgamated with Queen's Royal Regiment (West Surrey) to form the Queen's Royal Surrey Regiment.

== Regimental museum ==
The Surrey Infantry Museum was based at Clandon Park House, near Guildford until it was destroyed in a fire in April 2015.

== Battle honours ==
The regiment's battle honours are as follows:

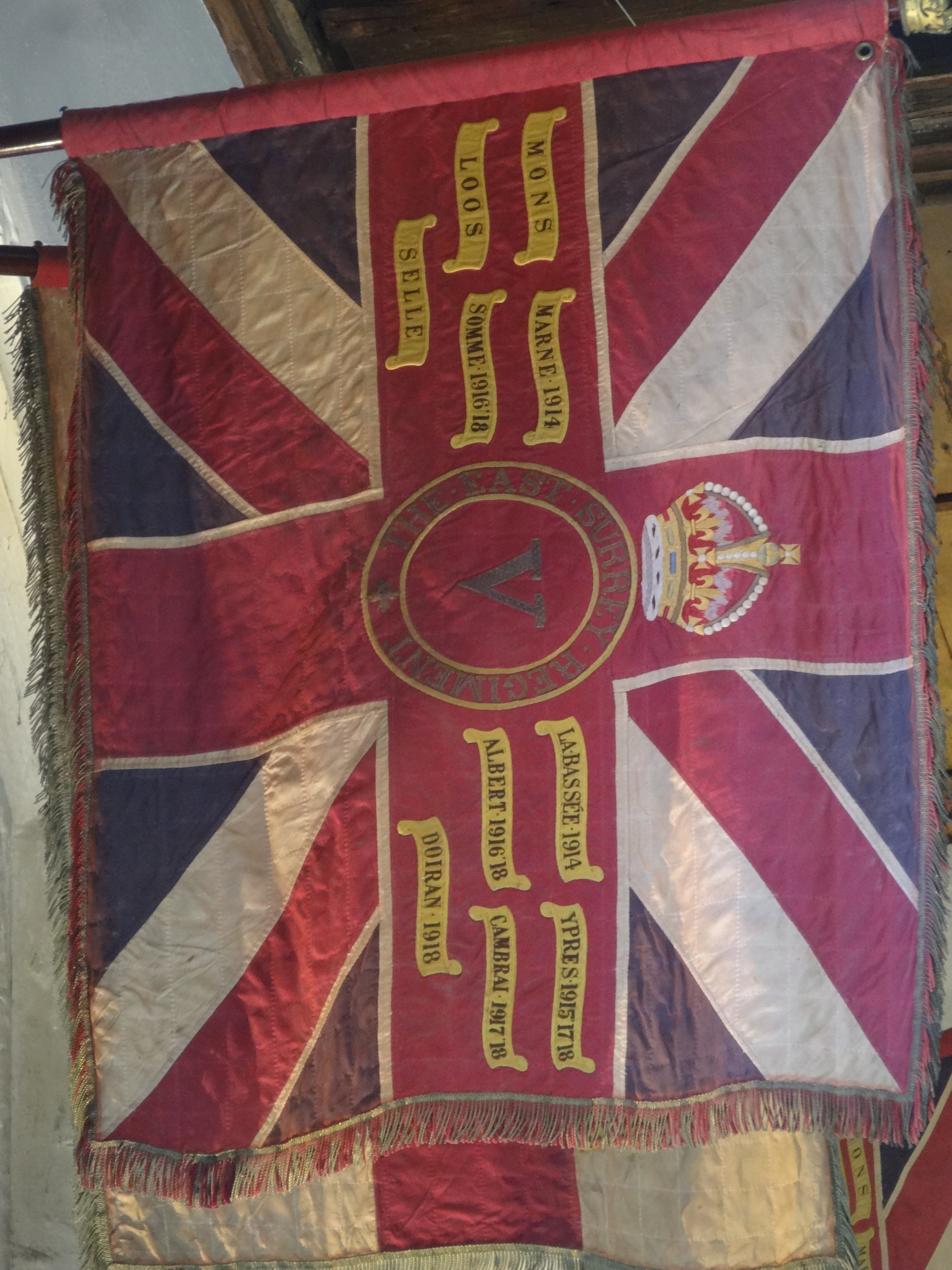
Colours, in All Saints church, Kingston

- From 31st Regiment of Foot: Talavera, Albuhera, Vittoria, Pyrenees, Nivelle, Nive, Orthes, Peninsula, Cabool 1842, Moodkee, Ferozeshah, Aliwal, Sobraon, Sevastopol, Taku Forts, Gibraltar 1704–05 (awarded 1909), Dettingen (awarded 1882)
- From 70th Regiment of Foot: Guadeloupe 1810, New Zealand, Afghanistan 1878–79, Martinique 1794 (awarded 1909)
- Suakin 1885, Relief of Ladysmith, South Africa 1899–1902
- The Great War (18 battalions): Mons, Le Cateau, Retreat from Mons, Marne 1914, Aisne 1914, La Bassée 1914, Armentières 1914, Hill 60, Ypres 1915 '17 '18, Gravenstafel, St. Julien, Frezenberg, Bellewaarde, Loos, Somme 1916 '18, Albert 1916 '18, Bazentin, Delville Wood, Pozières, Guillemont, Flers-Courcelette, Morval, Thiepval, Le Transloy, Ancre Heights, Ancre 1916, Arras 1917 '18, Vimy 1917, Scarpe 1917, Messines 1917, Pilckem, Langemarck 1917, Menin Road, Polygon Wood, Broodseinde, Poelcappelle, Passchendaele, Cambrai 1917 '18, St. Quentin, Bapaume 1918, Rosières, Avre, Lys, Estaires, Hazebrouck, Amiens, Hindenburg Line, Épéhy, Canal du Nord, St. Quentin Canal, Courtrai, Selle, Sambre, France and Flanders 1914–18, Italy 1917–18, Struma, Doiran 1918, Macedonia 1915–18, Egypt 1915, Aden, Mesopotamia 1917–18, Murman 1919
- The Second World War: Defence of Escaut, Dunkirk 1940, North-West Europe 1940, Tebourba, Fort McGregor, Oued Zarga, Djebel Ang, Djebel Djaffa Pass, Medjez Plain, Longstop Hill 1943, Tunis, Montarnaud, North Africa 1942–43, Adrano, Centuripe, Sicily 1943, Trigno, Sangro, Cassino4, Capture of Forli, Argenta Gap, Italy 1943–45, Greece 1944–45, Kampar, Malaya 1941–42

== Victoria Crosses ==
- Private (later Sergeant) Albert Edward Curtis, Second Boer War
- Lieutenant (later Brigadier) George Rowland Patrick Roupell, Great War
- Second Lieutenant (later Major) Benjamin Handley Geary, Great War
- Private (later Corporal) Edward Dwyer, Great War
- Second Lieutenant (later Captain) Arthur James Terence Fleming-Sandes, Great War
- Corporal Edward Foster, Great War
- Sergeant (later Captain) Harry Cator, Great War
- Corporal John McNamara, Great War
- Lieutenant (later Lieutenant Colonel) Eric Charles Twelves Wilson, World War II

== Regimental Colonels ==
Colonels of the regiment were:

- 1881–1898 (1st Battalion): Gen. Sir Edward Lugard, GCB (ex 31st Foot)
- 1881 (2nd Battalion): Gen. Thomas James Galloway (ex 70th Foot. Died NZ, 1881)
- 1881–1886 (2nd Battalion): Gen. Sir Richard Chambre Hayes Taylor, GCB
- 1898–1920: Gen. Sir George Richards Greaves, GCB, KCMG
- 1920–1939: Maj-Gen. Sir John Raynsford Longley, KCMG, CB
- 1939–1946: Gen. Sir Richard Foster Carter Foster, KCB, CMG, DSO
- 1946–1954: Lt-Gen. Sir Arthur Arnhold Bullick Dowler, KCB, KBE
- 1954–1959: Brig. George Rowland Patrick Roupell, VC, CB
- 1959: Regiment amalgamated with the Queen's Royal Regiment (West Surrey), to form the Queen's Royal Surrey Regiment

== Sources ==
- Cannon, Richard (1850). Historical record of the 31st or the Huntingdonshire Regiment of Foot. Parker, Furnivall & Parker. ISBN 9780665483530. OCLC 223603501.
- Daniell, David Scott (1957). The History of the East Surrey Regiment. Vol. IV 1920–1952. London: Ernest Benn. OCLC 492800784.
- Ford, Ken (1999). Battleaxe Division. Stroud, Gloucestershire: Sutton. ISBN 0-7509-1893-4.
- J.B.M. Frederick, Lineage Book of British Land Forces 1660–1978, Vol I, Wakefield: Microform Academic, 1984, ISBN 1-85117-007-3.
- Col George Jackson Hay, An Epitomized History of the Militia (The Constitutional Force), London:United Service Gazette, 1905/Ray Westlake Military Books, 1987 ISBN 0-9508530-7-0.
- Brig E.A. James, British Regiments 1914–18, London: Samson Books, 1978/Uckfield: Naval & Military Press, 2001, ISBN 978-1-84342-197-9.
- Joslen, Lt-Col H.F. (2003). Orders of Battle, United Kingdom and Colonial Formations and Units in the Second World War, 1939–1945. Uckfield: Naval & Military. ISBN 1843424746.
- Langley, Michael (1972). The East Surrey Regiment. London: Leo Cooper. ISBN 0-85052-114-9.
- Squire, G.L.A.; Hill, P.G.E. (1992). The Surreys in Italy. Clandon, Surrey: The Queen's Royal Surrey Regiment Museum. OCLC 681165587.
- Squire, G.L.A.; Hill, P.G.E. (1996). The Final Years. Clandon, Surrey: The Queen's Royal Surrey Regiment Museum. OCLC 738531033.
- Ray Westlake, Tracing the Rifle Volunteers, Barnsley: Pen and Sword, 2010, ISBN 978-1-84884-211-3.
