= Royal Kent =

Royal Kent may refer to:

- The Queen's Own Buffs, The Royal Kent Regiment
- The Royal Kent Church of England Primary School in Oxshott, Surrey
- Royal Kent, an English manufacturer of bone china
- The Royal Kent bugle, a 19th-century keyed variant of the brass instrument
