= 31st (Huntingdonshire) Regiment of Foot =

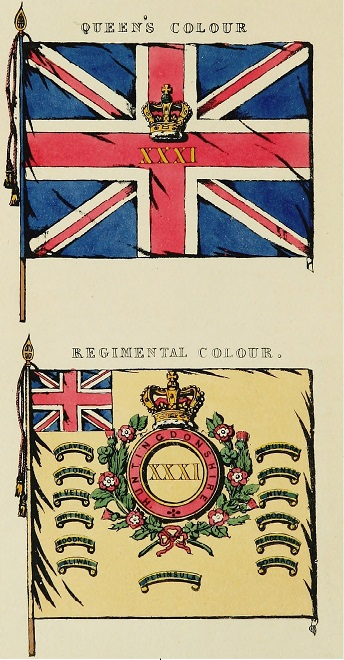
- Colours of the 31st (Huntingdonshire) Regiment of Foot
- Active: 1702–1881
- Country: England (1702–1707); Great Britain (1707–1800); United Kingdom (1801–1881)
- Allegiance: English Army; British Army
- Type: Infantry
- Garrison/HQ: The Barracks, Kingston upon Thames
- Nickname: The Young Buffs
- Colors: Buff facings
- Engagements: War of the Austrian Succession; American Revolutionary War; Peninsular War; First Anglo-Afghan War; Crimean War

The 31st (Huntingdonshire) Regiment of Foot was an infantry regiment of the British Army, raised in 1702. Under the Childers Reforms it amalgamated with the 70th (Surrey) Regiment of Foot to form the East Surrey Regiment in 1881.

== History ==
=== Origins ===
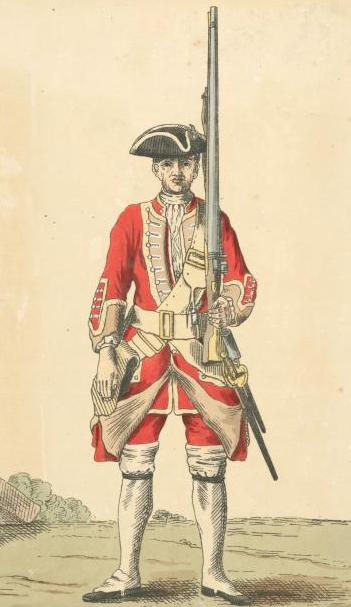
A regimental private in c. 1742

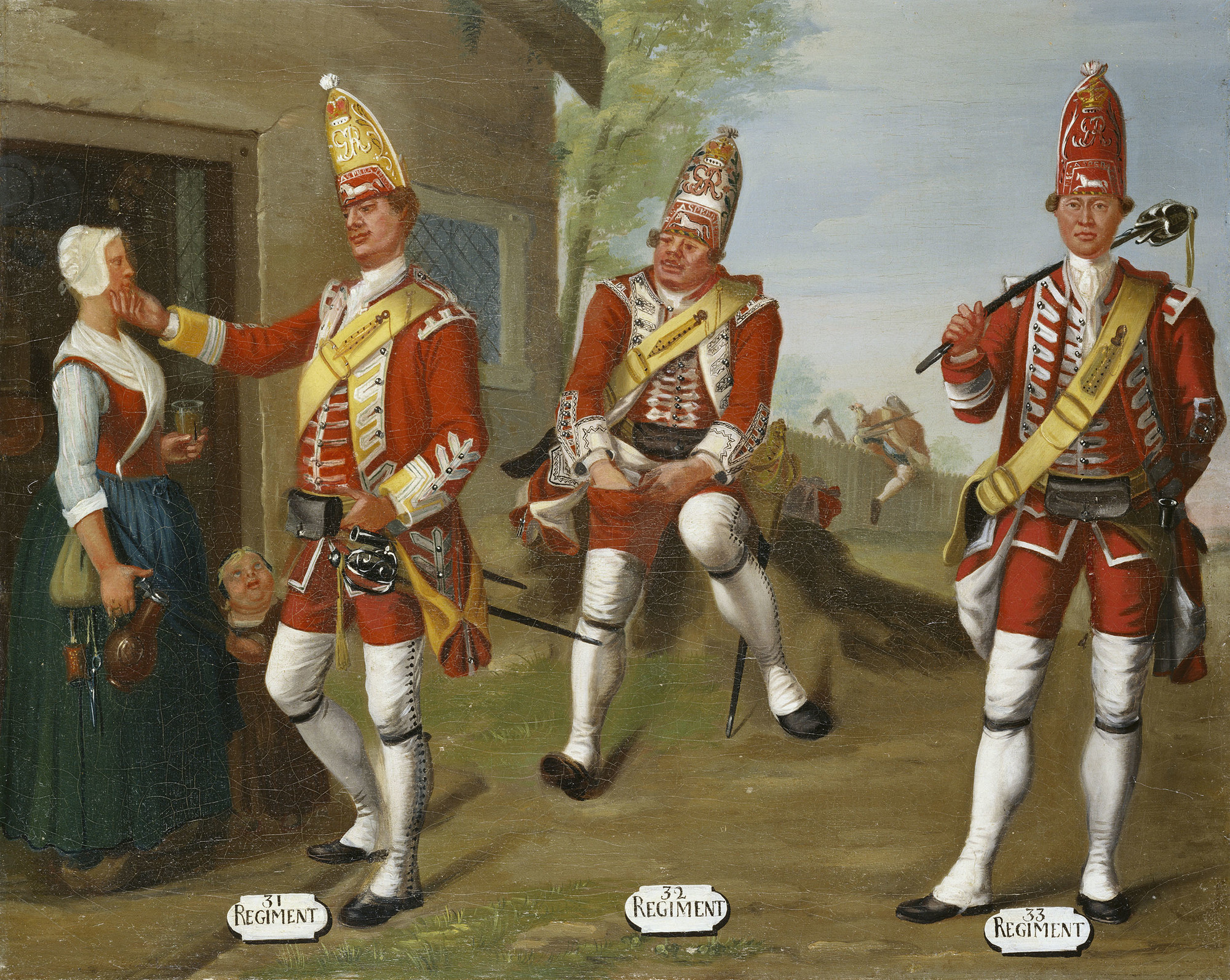
c. 1751 painting of a regimental grenadier (left)

In 1694, during the Nine Years' War, Sir Richard Atkins was authorised to raise a regiment of foot for service in Ireland. Sir Richard Atkins's Regiment of Foot was duly formed. In 1694 the colonelcy of the unit changed and it became Colonel George Villier's Regiment of Foot. With the signing of the Treaty of Ryswick in 1697 the war came to an end. Villier's Regiment was duly disbanded in 1698.

By 1702 England was again involved in a European conflict which became known as the War of the Spanish Succession. Villiers was commissioned to reform his regiment as marines. In February 1702 George Villier's Regiment of Marines (or the 2nd Regiment of Marines) was reraised.

The unit took part in the capture and defence of Gibraltar in July 1704. It subsequently took part in a number of actions in Spain and the Mediterranean, including the capture of Barcelona and Mallorca. The regiment's title changed with the name of its colonel: Alexander Luttrell in 1703, Joshua Churchill in 1706 and Sir Henry Goring in 1711.

With the signing of the Treaty of Utrecht in 1713 the war came to an end. The majority of the marine regiments were disbanded, with some retained and converted to line infantry. Gorings Marines were one of these and became Sir Henry Goring's Regiment of Foot, with precedence as the 31st regiment of foot. The unit saw action repelling the Jacobite rising of 1715. They then spent twenty-six years manning garrisons in Ireland and England.

=== War of the Austrian Succession ===
The regiment sailed to Flanders in summer 1742 and took part in the Battle of Dettingen in June 1743. It was at this engagement that the unit received the nickname "Young Buffs". They were part of a force led into action by King George II who mistook them for the 3rd Regiment of Foot, who were known as '"the Buffs" due to their buff facings and waistcoats, the sovereign called out, "Bravo, Buffs! Bravo!". When one of his aides, an officer of the 3rd Regiment of Foot, corrected the monarch, he then cheered, "Bravo, Young Buffs! Bravo!". It was subsequently at the Battle of Fontenoy in May 1745, where it suffered heavy losses, and the Battle of Melle in July 1745, returning to England in October 1745. The regiment was posted to Menorca in 1749.

On 1 July 1751 a royal warrant was issued declaring that in future regiments were no longer to be known by their colonel's name, but by the "Number or Rank of the Regiment". Accordingly, Lieutenant-General Henry Holmes's Regiment was renamed as the 31st Regiment of Foot. The regiment returned to the United Kingdom in 1752. A second battalion was formed in 1756, and was reconstituted as the 70th Regiment of Foot in 1758. The regiment embarked for Pensacola in British West Florida in c. October 1765 but suffered heavy losses there due to fever. The regiment moved to Saint Vincent in 1772 and lost its commanding officer, Lieutenant Colonel Ralph Walsh, in an ambush by local tribesmen in January 1773. The regiment returned to England in 1774.

=== American Revolutionary War ===
In May 1776 the regiment arrived in Quebec for service in the American War of Independence. It saw action at the Siege of Fort Ticonderoga in July 1777 but many of its men were taken prisoner at the Battles of Saratoga in September 1777. In 1782 all regiments of the line without a royal title were given a county designation and the regiment became the 31st (Huntingdonshire) Regiment of Foot. Following the ending of that war the regiment formed part of the garrison of Quebec before returning to England in November 1787. The regiment was involved in suppressing the Priestley Riots in Birmingham in July 1791.

=== French revolutionary and Napoleonic wars ===
Arms of John Byng, 1st Earl of Strafford, with augmentation of honour granted in 1815 by the Prince Regent of in bend sinister a representation of the colour of the 31st Regiment of Foot, in recognition of his heroic action at the Battle of the Nive.

The regiment took part in the capture of Martinique in March 1794, the capture of Guadeloupe in April 1794 and the capture of Saint Lucia in May 1796 but suffered heavy losses due to fever before returning to England in 1797. It was also involved in the Battle of Alkmaar in October 1799 during the Anglo-Russian invasion of Holland. The regiment was then posted to Menorca in 1801. A 2nd battalion was again formed in 1805 and the regiment next took part in the Alexandria expedition in 1807. The 1st Battalion was stationed on Sicily in 1813. In March 1814, the 1st Battalion embarked for Northern Italy. Alongside the 8th Line Battalion, King's German Legion it took part in the Siege of Genoa (1814).

A second battalion was initiated October 1804 at the regimental HQ in Chester and embodied in July 1805. Posted to Winchester and then Guernsey, it moved to Ireland in May 1807. Recruits were drawn from the Manchester Militia and also from the Irish Militia. Later, the 1st and 2nd Garrison Battalions also provided men before the move to Ireland and Limerick where officers travelled across the country to recruit from many Militia – including Clare, Kilkenny, Sligo, South Cork, Louth, Kerry, Leitrim, City of Limerick, Londonderry – men were also regularly recruited from Dublin and Enniskillen – so that numbers were also almost doubled (a small group also joined, presumably as light infantry, from the North Devon militia). Prior to departing to the Peninsula in October 1808, women were required to leave; 92 went to Ireland and 20 went to England, possibly reflecting the make up of the battalion.

Scheduled to go to A Coruña, the battalion disembarked with the 3rd battalion of the 27th (Inniskilling) Regiment of Foot at Lisbon to release some experienced troops. After a period of movement in Portugal, the battalion joined Arthur Wellesley's first, short-lived, push into Spain. As part of Major-General John Randoll Mackenzie's Division, the battalion was placed some miles in advance of Talavera to cover the movement of Gregorio García de la Cuesta's Spanish army back to defensive positions. The battalion sustained many casualties and had many soldiers captured in the Battle of Talavera in July 1809. Captain William Lodge was killed in action. In addition, Captain Coleman, Lieutenants George Beamish, Adderly Beamish and Girdlestone, and Ensigns Gamble and Soden and their medical officer Henry Edwards were all wounded and taken prisoner (Edwards subsequently dying).

The battalion also took part in the Battle of Albuera in May 1811, and the Battle of Vitoria in June 1813 and, having pursued the French Army into France, the Battle of Nivelle in November 1813 and the Battle of Orthez in February 1814. The regiment was reduced to a single battalion regiment on 24 October 1814 when the second battalion was disbanded at Portsmouth.

=== First Anglo-Afghan War ===
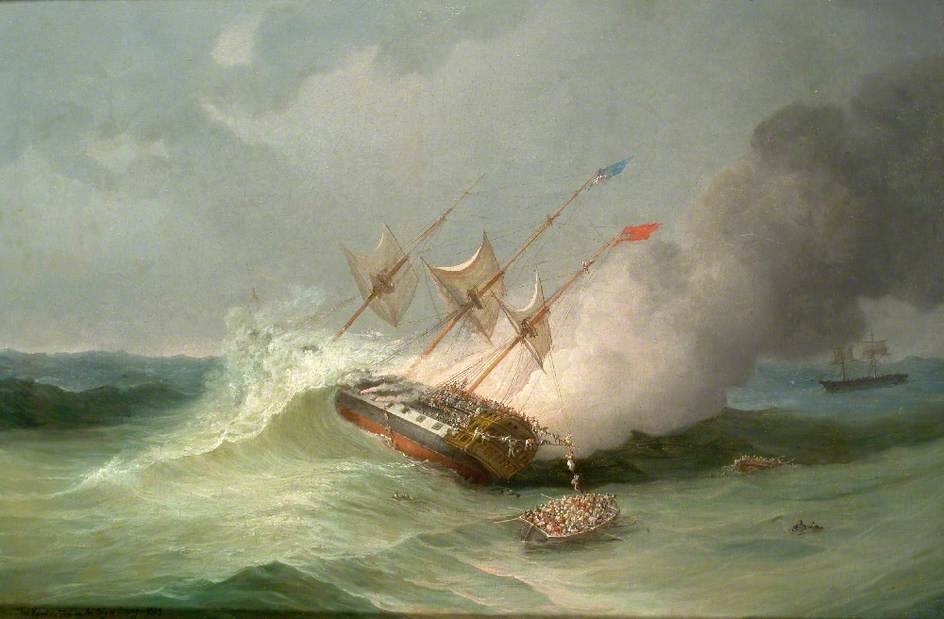
Burning of 'The Kent', 1st March 1825 (William Daniell, c. 1827)

Following years of garrison duty in various stations in Europe, in 1824 the regiment were ordered to India under Colonel Pearson and Major McGrego. Some 54 men of the regiment died on 1 March 1825 when their transport, the East Indiaman Kent caught fire in the Bay of Biscay. One woman and 20 children affiliated with the regiment also died. The remainder of the 20 officers, 344 soldiers, 43 women, and 66 children, belonging to the regiment that had embarked on the vessel were rescued. As the official record expresses it: "In the midst of dangers against which it seemed hopeless to struggle-at a time when no aid appeared, and passively to die was all that remained-each man displayed the manly resignation, the ready obedience, and the unfailing discipline characteristics of a good soldier." With the outbreak of the First Anglo-Afghan War in 1839, the regiment moved to Afghanistan and fought with Sir George Pollock's avenging army at the Battle of Kabul in autumn 1842.

=== The Victorian era ===
The First Anglo-Sikh War broke out in 1845. The regiment, who had returned to India from Afghanistan in 1840, were part of the British force at the Battle of Mudki in December 1845, the Battle of Ferozeshah also in December 1845, the Battle of Aliwal in January 1846 and the Battle of Sobraon in February 1846. The regiment arrived back in England in December 1846. In 1854 the regiment sailed to the Crimea, and fought at the Siege of Sevastopol in winter 1854.

The regiment next saw active service in China, moving there in 1860 during the Second Opium War and taking part in the capture of the Taku Forts. The regiment remained in China until 1863, and was involved in suppressing the Taiping Rebellion. For the regiment's remaining separate existence it was based at various garrisons in the United Kingdom, Gibraltar and Malta.

As part of the Cardwell Reforms of the 1870s, where single-battalion regiments were linked together to share a single depot and recruiting district in the United Kingdom, the 31st was linked with the 70th (Surrey) Regiment of Foot, and assigned to district no. 47 at The Barracks, Kingston upon Thames. On 1 July 1881 the Childers Reforms came into effect and the regiment amalgamated with the 70th (Surrey) Regiment of Foot to form the East Surrey Regiment. The 70th had originally been formed as the regiment's 2nd Battalion in 1756.

== Battle honours ==
The regiment was granted the following battle honours:

- Talavera (27 July 1809: awarded 1823)
- Albuhera (16 May 1811: awarded 1816)
- Vittoria (21 June 1813: awarded 1823)
- Pyrenees (28 July – 2 August 1813: awarded 1817)
- Nivelle (10 November 1813: awarded 1823)
- Nive (9 – 13 December 1813: awarded 1823)
- Orthes (27 February 1814: awarded 1847)
- Peninsula (1808 – 1814: awarded to 2nd Battalion in 1815, to whole regiment in 1825)
- Cabool, 1842 (August – September 1842: awarded 1844)
- Moodkee (18 December 1845: awarded 1847)
- Ferozeshah (21 December 1845: awarded 1847)
- Aliwal (28 January 1846: awarded 1847)
- Sobraon (10 February 1846: awarded 1849)
- Sevastopol (1854 – 1855: awarded 1855)
- Taku Forts (12 August 1860: awarded 1861)

Two further honours were granted to the successor East Surrey Regiment for the services of the regiment. In 1882 the battle honour "Dettingen" was allowed and in 1909 "Gibraltar 1704–1705" was awarded.

== Colonels ==
Colonels of the regiment have been as follows:

- 17û2–1703: Col George Villiers
- 1703–1706: Col Alexander Luttrell
- 1706–1711: Col Joshua Churchill
- 1711–1715: Col Sir Henry Goring, Bt.

=== 31st Regiment of Foot ===
- 1715–1728: Major-Gen Lord John Kerr
- 1728–1730: Major-Gen Charles Cathcart, 8th Lord Cathcart
- 1730–1737: Lt-Gen William Hargrave
- 1737–1745: Brig-Gen William Handasyde
- 1745–1749: Col Lord Henry Beauclerk
- 1749–1762: Lt-Gen Henry Holmes
- 1762–1780: Lt-Gen Sir James Adolphus Oughton KB
- 1780–1792: Gen Thomas Clarke

=== 31st Huntingdonshire Regiment ===
- 1792–1793: Major-Gen James Stuart
- 1793–1831: Gen Henry Phipps, 1st Earl of Mulgrave GCB
- 1831–1834: Gen Sir Henry Warde GCB
- 1834–1838: Lt-Gen Sir Edward Barnes GCB
- 1838–1847: Gen Sir Colin Halkett GCB GCH
- 1847–1853: Gen Henry Otway Brand-Trevor, 21st Lord Dacre CB
- 1853–1859: Gen Sir Alexander Leith KCB
- 1859–1862: Gen Sir Patrick Edmonstone Craigie KCB
- 1862–1881: Gen Sir Edward Lugard GCB

== Sources ==
- Cannon, Richard (1850). Historical record of the Thirty-first, or, The Huntingdonshire Regiment of Foot containing an account of the formation of the regiment in 1702 and its subsequent services to 1850. Historical records of the British Army. Parker, Furnivall and Parker.
- Edwards, T J (1953). Standards, Guidons and Colours of the Commonwealth Forces. Aldershot: Gale & Polden.
- Nafziger, George F.; Gioannini, Marco (2002). The defense of the Napoleonic kingdom of Northern Italy, 1813-1814. Westport, Conn.: Praeger. ISBN 978-0-313-07531-5.
- Pearce, Hugh W. (2014). History of the East Surrey Regiment 1702–1914. Naval and Military Press. ISBN 978-1847341006.
- Rudolf, R de M (1905). Short History of the Territorial Regiments of the British Army. London: Her Majesty's Stationery Office.
- Sumner, Ian (2001). British Colours & Standards 1747 – 1881 (2): Infantry. Oxford: Osprey. ISBN 1-84176-201-6.
- Swinson, Arthur (1972). A Register of the Regiments and Corps of the British Army. London: The Archive Press. ISBN 0-85591-000-3.
