= John McNamara (VC) =

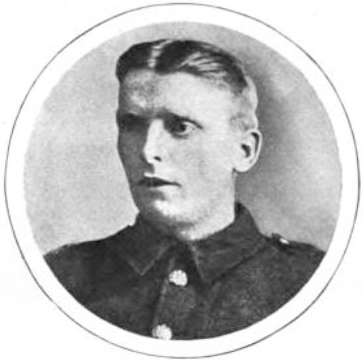
- Born: 28 October 1887; Walton-Le-Dale, Lancashire, England
- Died: 16 October 1918 (aged 30); Solesmes, France
- Burial place: Romries Communal Cemetery Extension
- Military career
- Allegiance: United Kingdom
- Branch: British Army
- Rank: Corporal
- Units: The East Surrey Regiment
- Conflicts: World War I †
- Awards: Victoria Cross

John McNamara VC (28 October 1887 – 16 October 1918) was an English recipient of the Victoria Cross, the highest and most prestigious award for gallantry in the face of the enemy that can be awarded to British and Commonwealth forces.

He was 30 years old, and a corporal in the 9th Battalion, The East Surrey Regiment, British Army during the First World War when the following deed took place for which he was awarded the Victoria Cross.

On 3 September 1918 north west of Lens, France, when operating a telephone in evacuated enemy trenches occupied by his battalion, Corporal McNamara realised that a determined enemy counter-attack was gaining ground. Rushing to the nearest post, he made very good use of a revolver taken from a wounded officer and then, seizing a Lewis gun, he fired it until it jammed. By this time, he was alone in the post and, having destroyed the telephone, he joined the nearest post and maintained a Lewis gun until reinforcements arrived.

He was killed in action near Solesmes, France, on 16 October 1918.

In 2018, a plaque was unveiled in the John McNamara Gardens in the centre of Bamber Bridge, less than half a mile from where he was born. Three generations of his family, politicians, soldiers and priests stood in tribute to McNamara, 100 years after the courageous act which earned him the only Victoria Cross awarded to a resident of South Ribble.

== The medal ==
His Victoria Cross is displayed at the Queen's Royal Surrey Regiment Museum, in Clandon Park, Surrey.
