= The Barracks, Kingston upon Thames =

- Kingston upon Thames
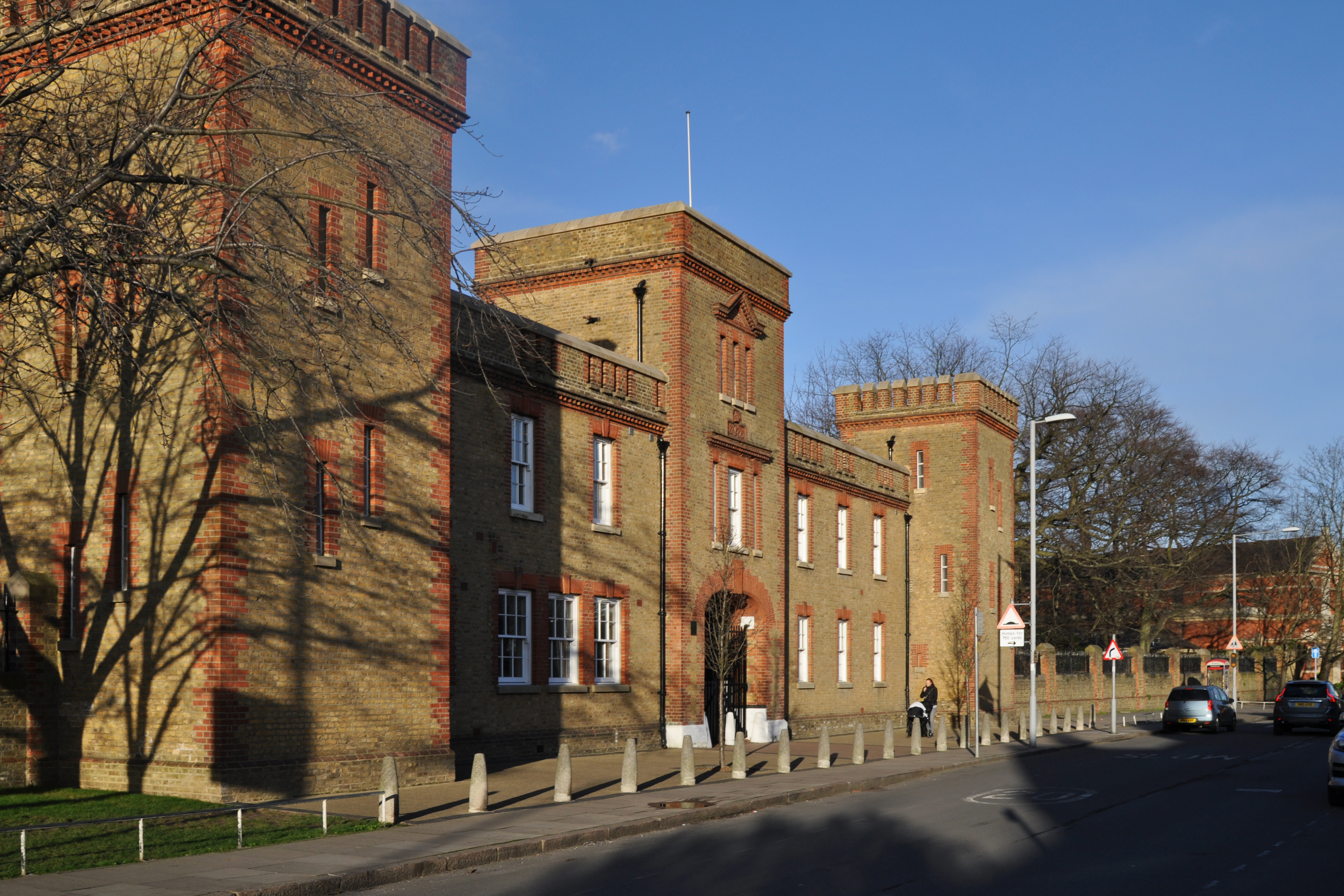
- The Barracks, Kings Road, Kingston upon Thames

Site information
- Type: Barracks
- Owner: Ministry of Defence
- Operator: British Army

Location
- Location within Greater London
- Coordinates: 51.41930°N 0.29434°W

Site history
- Built: 1874–1875
- Built for: War Office
- In use: 1875–1959

Garrison information
- Occupants: East Surrey Regiment

The Barracks was a military installation in Kingston upon Thames.

== History ==
The barracks were built on agricultural land between 1874 and 1875. Their creation took place as part of the Cardwell Reforms which encouraged the localisation of British military forces. The barracks became the depot for the 31st (Huntingdonshire) Regiment of Foot and the 70th (Surrey) Regiment of Foot. Following the Childers Reforms, the 31st and 70th regiments amalgamated to form the East Surrey Regiment with its depot in the barracks in 1881.

Many recruits enlisted at the barracks at the start of the First World War in August 1914. A Regimental Museum was opened in 1928.

The East Surrey Regiment remained at the barracks until they amalgamated with Queen's Royal Regiment (West Surrey) to form the Queen's Royal Surrey Regiment in 1959 and the barracks were largely demolished in 1962 although the keep was retained. In 2011 a developer submitted proposals to convert the keep into flats.
