= Arthur Fleming-Sandes =

Arthur James Terence Fleming-Sandes VC
- Born: Alfred James Terence Fleming-Sandes; 24 June 1894; Tulse Hill, London, England
- Died: 24 May 1961 (aged 66); Romsey, Hampshire, England
- Military career
- Allegiance: United Kingdom
- Branch: British Army
- Service years: 1914–1919, 1942–1944
- Rank: Major
- Units: Artists' Rifles; The East Surrey Regiment
- Conflicts: World War I World War II
- Awards: Victoria Cross; Order of the Nile
- Other work: Barrister

Major Arthur James Terence Fleming-Sandes VC (24 June 1894 – 24 May 1961) was an English recipient of the Victoria Cross, the highest and most prestigious award for gallantry in the face of the enemy that can be awarded to British and Commonwealth forces.

== Early life ==
Fleming-Sandes was born at Northstead Road, Tulse Hill Park, London on 24 June 1894 the son of Alfred Fleming-Sandes. He was educated at Dulwich College Preparatory School and at King's School, Canterbury. The day after the start of the First World War he enlisted as a private in the Artists Rifles and was on active duty in France from October 1914. On 9 May 1915 he was commissioned as a temporary second lieutenant in The East Surrey Regiment.

== Victoria Cross ==
Fleming-Sandes was 21 years old, and a temporary second lieutenant in the 2nd Battalion, The East Surrey Regiment, British Army during the First World War when the following deed took place for which he was awarded the VC.

On 29 September 1915 at the Hohenzollern Redoubt, France, Second Lieutenant Fleming-Sandes was sent to command a company which was in a very critical position. His men, very much shaken by continual bombing and machine-gun fire, were beginning to retire, but the second lieutenant collected a few bombs and jumping on the parapet in full view of the Germans, only 20 yards (18 m) away, threw them. Although severely wounded almost at once, he continued to advance and throw bombs until he was again wounded. This act put new heart into his men and saved the situation.

His Victoria Cross is displayed at the Queen's Royal Surrey Regiment Museum, Clandon Park, Surrey.

== Later life ==
Fleming-Sandes left the Army as a lieutenant at the end of the war and in 1919 he joined the educational department of the Sudan government. In 1924 he moved to the political department and in 1931 he was awarded the Order of the Nile. In 1935 he was appointed a Judge of the Sudan High Court and he married Dorothea May Weeks the following year. From 1942 he was Judge Advocate-General of the Sudan Defence Force before he retired in 1944 and returned to England. Upon his return to England he became chairman of the Pensions Appeal Tribunal for England and Wales until 1948. He died on 24 May 1961 aged 66.
