= 70th (Surrey) Regiment of Foot =

- c. 1874 regimental glengarry badge for other ranks
- Active: 10 December 1756–1 July 1881
- Country: Great Britain (1756–1800); United Kingdom (1801–1881)
- Branch: British Army
- Type: Infantry
- Role: Line infantry
- Size: One battalion
- Garrison/HQ: The Barracks, Kingston upon Thames
- Colors: Facings: Light grey
- Engagements: American Revolutionary War; Napoleonic Wars; War of 1812; Indian Rebellion; Second Anglo-Afghan War

The 70th (Surrey) Regiment of Foot was a regiment of the British Army, raised in 1756. Under the Childers Reforms it amalgamated with the 31st (Huntingdonshire) Regiment of Foot to form the East Surrey Regiment in 1881.

== History ==
=== Formation ===
Regimental drummer's mitre cap made in c. 1760

The formation of the regiment was prompted by the expansion of the army as a result of the commencement of the Seven Years' War. On 25 August 1756 it was ordered that a number of existing regiments should raise a second battalion; among those chosen was the 31st Regiment of Foot. The 2nd Battalion of the 31st Regiment of Foot was formed on 10 December 1756 and renumbered as the 70th (Glasgow Lowland) Regiment of Foot on 21 April 1758. The regiment was sent to Ireland in 1763 and on to the West Indies in 1764 where it suffered serious losses due to illness before returning home in 1774. It embarked for North America in 1775 for service in the American Revolutionary War. It was involved in the Battle of Sullivan's Island in June 1776 and the attack on Fort Lafayette in June 1779. The regiment acquired a county designation as the 70th (Surrey) Regiment of Foot in 1782 before returning home in 1784.

=== Napoleonic Wars ===
The regiment embarked for the West Indies again in 1793 for service in the French Revolutionary Wars. It took part in the Battle of Martinique in February 1794 and the Invasion of Guadeloupe in April 1794. The regiment then returned to Europe landing at Gibraltar in May 1795. It embarked for the West Indies again in February 1800 and based itself in Trinidad before arriving back in Jersey in May 1801. It embarked for the West Indies yet again in autumn 1803 and based itself in Antigua before moving to Saint Kitts in June 1806 and to Saint Thomas in December 1807. It then saw action during the Invasion of Guadeloupe in January 1810. The regiment embarked for home in June 1810 and, after moving into Ayr Barracks, reverted to the old title of 70th (Glasgow Lowland) Regiment of Foot in October 1812.

The regiment was tasked with suppressing riots in Montrose in January 1813 and, after guarding French prisoners of war in Perth for four months, embarked for Canada in August 1813. It was garrisoned in Montreal and then Cornwall on the Canadian frontier during the War of 1812. It moved to Fort George in April 1817, to Kingston in June 1819 and to Quebec in May 1821. The regiment regained its English county designation as the 70th (The Surrey) Regiment in December 1825 before returning home in September 1827.

=== Victorian era ===
c. 1840 portrait of a regimental officer

1849 illustration of the regiment's colours and two regimental officers

The regiment moved to Gibraltar in April 1834 and to Malta in July 1836. It returned to the West Indies in January 1838 and took up residence in Barbados before moving on to Montreal in Canada in June 1841 and embarking for home in May 1843. It departed for India in 1849 and helped to suppress the Indian Rebellion in 1857. The regiment moved to New Zealand in 1861 for service in the New Zealand Wars and took part in a skirmish at Rangiaohia in February 1864 during the Invasion of the Waikato. It returned to England in 1866 and then moved to Afghanistan in 1878 for service in the Second Anglo-Afghan War; it fought in Afghanistan with the Kandahar column.

As part of the Cardwell Reforms of the 1870s, where single-battalion regiments were linked together to share a single depot and recruiting district in the United Kingdom, the 70th was linked with the 31st (Huntingdonshire) Regiment of Foot, and assigned to district no. 47 at The Barracks, Kingston upon Thames. On 1 July 1881 the Childers Reforms came into effect and the regiment amalgamated with the 31st (Huntingdonshire) Regiment of Foot to become the 2nd Battalion of the East Surrey Regiment.

== Battle Honours ==
Battle honours gained by the regiment were:

- Guadeloupe 1810
- New Zealand 1863–66
- Afghanistan 1878-79

== Colonels of the Regiment ==
Colonels of the regiment were:

=== 70th (Glasgow Lowland) Regiment of Foot - (1758) ===
- 1758-1760: Gen. John Parslow
- 1760-1778: Gen. Cyrus Trapaud
- 1778-1783: Lt-Gen. William Tryon

=== 70th (Surrey) Regiment of Foot - (1782) ===
- 1783-1814: Gen. John Howard, 15th Earl of Suffolk

=== 70th (Glasgow Lowland) Regiment of Foot - (1812) ===
- 1814-1816: Gen. Hon. Sir Galbraith Lowry Cole, GCB
- 1816: Lt-Gen. Forbes Champagné
- 1816-1832: Gen. Kenneth Alexander Howard, 1st Earl of Effingham, GCB

=== 70th (Surrey) Regiment of Foot - (1825) ===
- 1832-1854: Gen. Gage John Hall
- 1854-1868: Gen. Sir George William Paty, KCB, KH
- 1868-1870: Gen. Sir Charles Hastings Doyle, KCMG
- 1870-1874: Lt-Gen. Sir Henry Knight Storks, GCB, GCMG
- 1874-1881: Gen. Thomas James Galloway (to East Surrey Regiment)
- 1881: Regiment amalgamated with the 31st (Huntingdonshire) Regiment of Foot to form The East Surrey Regiment

== Sources ==
- Cannon, Richard (1849). Historical Record of the Seventieth, or the Surrey Regiment of Foot. London: Parker, Furnivall and Parker.
