= Queen's Royal Surrey Regiment =

- Cap badge of the regiment
- Active: 1959–1966
- Country: United Kingdom
- Branch: British Army
- Type: Line Infantry
- Part of: Home Counties Brigade

The Queen's Royal Surrey Regiment was a line infantry regiment of the British Army which existed from 1959 to 1966. In 1966, it was amalgamated with the Queen's Own Buffs, The Royal Kent Regiment, the Royal Sussex Regiment and the Middlesex Regiment (Duke of Cambridge's Own) to form the Queen's Regiment, which later merged with the Royal Hampshire Regiment in September 1992 to form the Princess of Wales's Royal Regiment (Queen's and Royal Hampshires).

== History ==
As a consequence of defence cuts in the late 1950s, the Queen's Royal Regiment (West Surrey) and the East Surrey Regiment were amalgamated on 14 October 1959 to form the 1st Battalion, Queen's Royal Surrey Regiment.

In 1961 the 1st Queen's Surreys was sent to Aden. In 1962 the regiment joined the Hong Kong garrison, remaining there on a 2-year posting before heading for Münster, West Germany in 1964 as part of the British Army of the Rhine.

In 1966 the regiment's short existence came to an end when it, along with the three other remaining regiments of the Home Counties Brigade, was amalgamated to form the Queen's Regiment, one of the new 'large' regiments that were formed in the 1960s.

== Territorials ==
When the regiment was formed, the Territorial Army battalions of the merging regiments continued to use their former titles. However, in 1961, a reduction in the size of the TA led to the formation of 3rd and 4th Queen's Surreys:

- 3rd Battalion (TA) was formed of units affiliated to the Queen’s Royal Regiment: the 5th and 6th battalions and the 565th Light Anti-Aircraft Regiment, Royal Artillery (the successor to 4th Battalion). Its headquarters were in Guildford.
- 4th Battalion (TA) was formed from former battalions of the East Surrey Regiment: the 6th East Surreys and the 23rd London Regiment. The battalion headquarters were in Kingston upon Thames.

The two territorial battalions were disbanded in 1967, with their successor units in the Territorial and Army Volunteer Reserve (TAVR) being "A" Company (Queen's Surreys) of the 5th (Volunteer) Battalion, Queen's Regiment and the 6th (Territorial) Battalion, Queen's Regiment (Queen's Surreys).

== Regimental museum ==
The Queen's Royal Surrey Regiment archives were put in storage when Regimental Headquarters and Museum in the Keep at Kingston upon Thames closed. Colonel JW Sewell reached agreement with the National Trust to re-establish the regiment's museum at Clandon Park House, West Clandon. The regiment's archives and library are located at the Surrey History Centre in Woking.

The Queen's Royal Surrey Regiment Museum opened in 1981 with exhibits including uniforms, medals, weapons, regalia, photographs and memorabilia. The museum was upgraded in 2001. In 2011, with part funding from the Heritage Lottery Fund further redevelopment took place and, in July that year, the museum merged with those of the Princess of Wales's Royal Regiment and the Queen’s Regiment to become The Surrey Infantry Museum. In April 2015 Clandon Park House caught fire as a result of an electrical fault in the basement. The Surrey Infantry Museum was lost in the fire as it was located in the basement and remains closed as of 2020 with the remnants of the collection held primarily at Surrey History Centre.

== Regimental Colonels ==
The Colonels of the Regiment were:

- 1959–1964: Maj-Gen. John Francis Metcalfe, CB, CBE
- 1964–1966: Maj-Gen. Francis James Claude Piggott, CB, CBE, DSO (to Queen's Regiment as Deputy Colonel)

== Alliances ==
The regiment's alliances included:

- Canada The Queen's York Rangers (1st American Regiment) -- Canada (1959–1966)
- Canada South Alberta Light Horse—Canada (1959–1966)
- Australia 2nd Infantry Battalion (The City of Newcastle Regiment) -- Australia (1959–60)
- Australia Royal New South Wales Regiment—Australia (1960–1966)
- The Northern Rhodesia Regiment (1959–1964)

== Freedoms ==
- (England) 1964: Battersea.
