= Queen's Own Buffs, The Royal Kent Regiment =

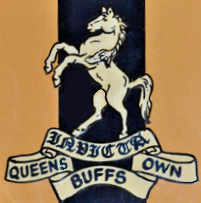
- Regimental badge
- Active: 1 March 1961 – 31 December 1966
- Country: United Kingdom
- Branch: British Army
- Type: Infantry
- Role: Line infantry
- Size: 1 Battalion

The Queen's Own Buffs, The Royal Kent Regiment was a line infantry regiment of the British Army from 1961 to 1966. Its lineage is continued by the Princess of Wales's Royal Regiment (Queen's and Royal Hampshires).

== History ==
The regiment was formed on 1 March 1961, as a consequence of defence cuts implemented in the 1950s, by the amalgamation of the Buffs (Royal East Kent Regiment) and the Queen's Own Royal West Kent Regiment.

In 1961, the regiment was deployed in Kenya, then a British colony. In the following year the regiment returned to the United Kingdom, where the 1st Battalion was presented with its first colours by its Colonel-in-Chief, HM King Frederik IX of Denmark at Folkestone on 23 June. In 1964 the regiment was deployed to British Guiana after violence broke out there, at a time when the South American colony was experiencing turbulent times. The regiment departed South America for the Far East the following year, joining the Hong Kong garrison.

In June 1966, the regiment was deployed on a six-month tour-of-duty in the jungles of Borneo to take part in the Indonesia–Malaysia confrontation. This had started in 1962 after an Indonesian-inspired rebellion took place in Brunei, which was successfully quelled. The 'Confrontation' officially ended a short while after the regiment arrived; it returned to Hong Kong upon the end of its tour.

The regiment existed for less than six years: on 31 December 1966, the four regiments of the Home Counties Brigade were merged to form the Queen's Regiment. The regiments merged were the Queen's Royal Surrey Regiment, the Queen's Own Buffs, the Royal Sussex Regiment and the Middlesex Regiment (Duke of Cambridge's Own). Each of the four regular battalions in the brigade became a battalion of the new "large regiment".

== Alliances ==
- Canada – The Queen's Own Rifles of Canada (1961–1966)
- Canada – 1st Battalion (Carleton and York), The Royal New Brunswick Regiment (1961–1966)
- Canada – The Essex and Kent Scottish (1961–1966)
- New Zealand – The Canterbury Regiment (1961–1964)
- New Zealand – 2nd Battalion (Canterbury and Nelson-Marlborough, and West Coast), Royal New Zealand Infantry (1964–1966)

== Other information ==
- Colonel-in-Chief: HM King Frederik IX of Denmark KG GCB GCVO GCStJ
- Colonel: Chief Commandant HRH The Princess Marina, Duchess of Kent CI GBE GCVO GCStJ

== Deputy Colonels ==
Deputy colonels of the regiment were:

- 1961–1961: Maj-Gen. Valentine Boucher, CB, CBE (ex the Buffs (Royal East Kent Regiment))
- 1961–1963?: Maj-Gen. Dennis Edmund Blaquiere Talbot, CB, CBE, DSO, MC, DL (as Associate Colonel) (ex The Queen's Own Royal West Kent Regiment)
- 1963?–1965: Maj-Gen. Dennis Edmund Blaquiere Talbot, CB, CBE, DSO, MC, DL
- 1965–1966: Lt-Gen. Sir Richard Craddock, KBE, CB, DSO (to the Queen's Regiment)
- 1966: Regiment amalgamated with The Queen's Royal Surrey Regiment, The Royal Sussex Regiment and The Middlesex Regiment (Duke of Cambridge's Own) to form The Queen's Regiment
