= Clandon Park House =

Fire-damaged country house in Surrey, England

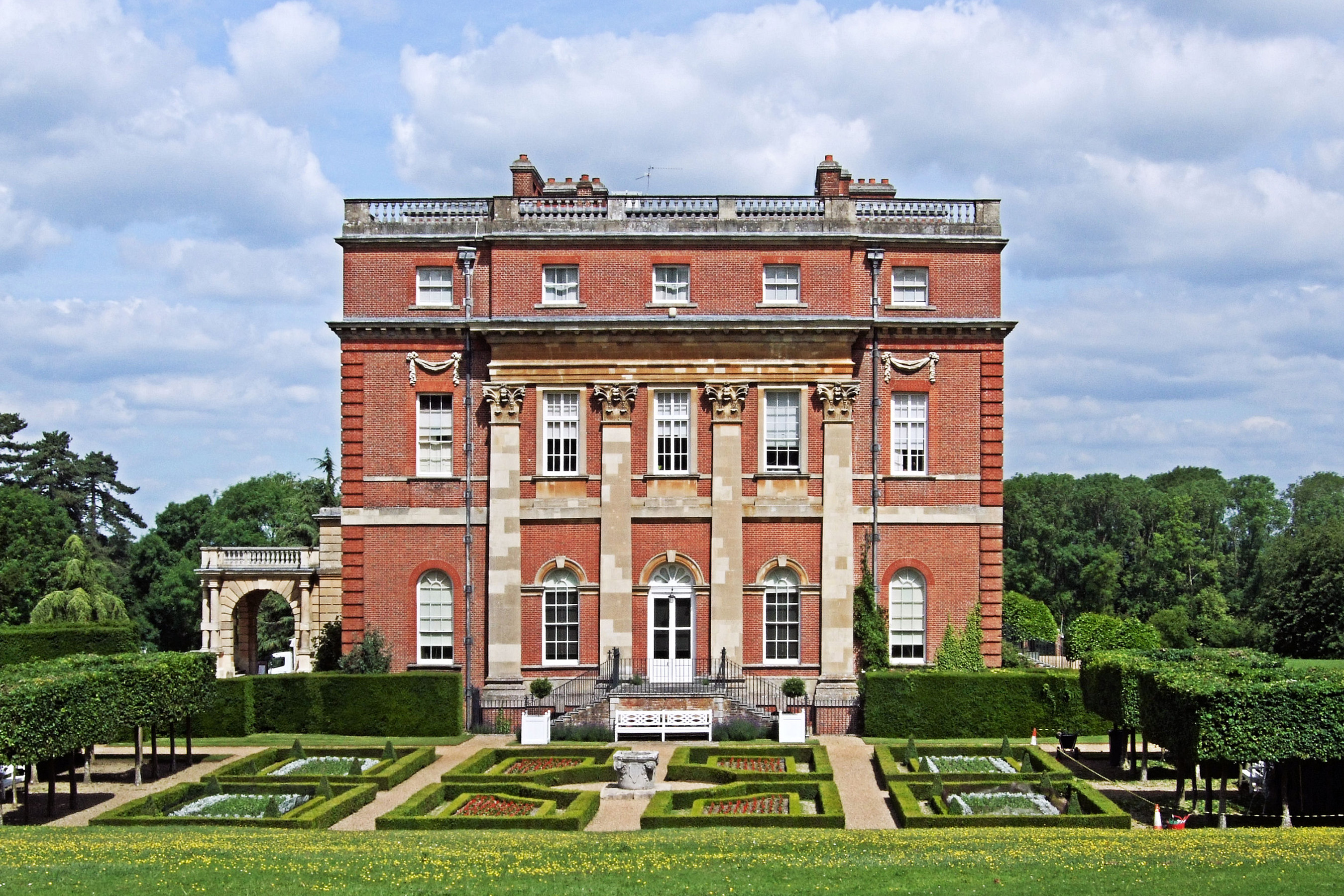
- The south front and parterre of Clandon Park House in 2014, a year before the fire

- Location within Surrey
- 51°15′02″N 0°30′30″W
- Type: Country house
- Location: West Clandon, Surrey
- OS grid reference: TQ 04210 51218

History
- Built: Early 18th Century

Site notes
- Architect: Giacomo Leoni
- Architectural style: Palladian
- Owner: National Trust

Listed Building – Grade I
- Official name: Clandon Park
- Designated: 14 June 1967
- Reference no.: 1294591

Clandon Park House is an early 18th-century grade I listed Palladian mansion in West Clandon, near Guildford in Surrey.

It stands in the south east corner of Clandon Park, a 220-hectare (540-acre) agricultural parkland estate which has been the seat of the Earls of Onslow for over two centuries. The house and gardens were given to the National Trust in 1956, but the park remains in private ownership. Some of the house's contents have also been acquired by the Trust in lieu of estate duty.

Construction of the house, designed by Italian architect Giacomo Leoni, began about 1730, and the interiors were finished by continental sculptors and plasterers in the 1740s. It replaced an Elizabethan house. The park was landscaped by Lancelot 'Capability' Brown in 1781, and there are two formal gardens on either side of the house. On the Epsom Road, leading to the park and house, are the Grade II* 18th century wrought iron gates with armorial overthrow, which Brown installed, and the gatehouses (1776), designed by Brown himself.

Near the house is a Māori meeting house, one of only four outside New Zealand, that was brought to England in the late 19th century. After being transferred to the National Trust, the house underwent restoration before it was opened to the public, and later became a wedding venue and filming location for period dramas.

Clandon Park House was badly damaged by fire in April 2015, probably caused by an electrical fault in the basement, leaving it "essentially a shell". Only one room, the Speaker's Parlour, was left intact. Thousands of historic artefacts, paintings, and items of furniture were lost in what has been described as a national tragedy. In January 2016, the National Trust announced that some of the principal rooms on the ground floor would be fully restored to the original 18th-century designs, and upper floors would be used for exhibitions and events. However, the Trust announced in 2022 its intention to restore only the Speaker's Parlour, the exterior walls, the roof and the windows and conserve the rest of the house in its ruined state while making it accessible to the public. Building work is due to start in autumn 2025 and the property expected to reopen in 2029.

== History ==
The estate and Elizabethan house, together with Temple Court Farm at Merrow, was purchased in 1641 from Sir Richard Weston of nearby Sutton Place, by Sir Richard Onslow, MP for Surrey in the Long Parliament and great-grandfather of Thomas Onslow, 2nd Baron Onslow, who rebuilt it. Many members of the Onslow family followed political careers; three of them, including Arthur Onslow, were Speakers of the House of Commons. Their portraits would later hang in the Speaker's Parlour at Clandon House.

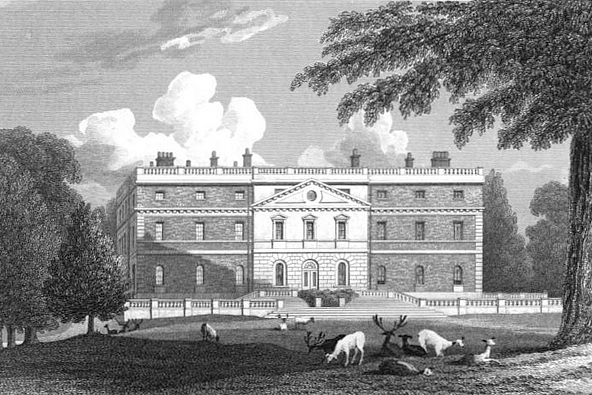
Engraving of the house, showing the west front and deer park, c. 1824

The house was built, or perhaps thoroughly rebuilt, in about 1730–33 (the latter date is on rainwater heads) by Thomas Onslow, 2nd Baron Onslow to the design of the Venetian architect Giacomo Leoni. It is a rectangular building of red brick and stone dressings. Clandon House interiors, completed in the 1740s, featured a two-storey Marble Hall, containing marble chimney pieces by the Flemish sculptor Michael Rysbrack, and a rococo plasterwork ceiling by Italian-Swiss artists Giuseppe Artari and Bagutti.

Clandon Park was landscaped by Lancelot 'Capability' Brown in 1776–81, replacing a French garden and transforming part of a disused canal into an ornamental lake. A porte-cochère was added to the principal façade in 1876. A sunken Dutch garden was created by Frances, Countess of Onslow at the north front of the house in the late 19th century. In 1895, the house was investigated for paranormal activity by John Crichton-Stuart, 3rd Marquess of Bute and Ada Goodrich Freer on behalf of the Society for Psychical Research. During World War I, the Onslow family created and managed a hospital in Clandon House for the war injured.

=== Slavery ===
The house has been described as having been built partly with the profits from slavery. In 1706, Elizabeth Knight inherited wealth equivalent to around £4 million from her uncle, Charles Knight, a slave trader and plantation owner. This included a plantation in Jamaica where up to 150 enslaved workers produced sugar and rum. In 1708, Elizabeth married Thomas Onslow, the founder of an insurance company that dealt with slave ships. The plantation was subsequently passed down through the Onslow family. Enslaved people were freed after the Slavery Abolition Act was passed in the UK in 1833.

=== Acquisition by the National Trust ===
In 1945, ownership of Clandon House was passed in trust to William Onslow, 6th Earl of Onslow on the death of his father, who had offered Clandon House to be used by the Public Record Office to protect government documents from destruction by bombs in the war. The family moved out to facilitate this. In 1956, the Earl decided that he wished to donate Clandon House to the nation. The house could not be donated directly by the Onslows, so the Earl arranged for his aunt, Gwendolen, Countess Iveagh, the daughter of William Hillier, 4th Earl of Onslow and a former MP herself, to purchase Clandon House from the Onslows for £1. The National Trust would only accept the house if it also received a substantial monetary endowment. This was arranged, and Clandon House with seven acres of land – including Hinemihi – were donated to the National Trust.

Historian James Lees-Milne described the house in 1942 as "dirty and in decay", and Merlin Waterson, former director of historic properties at the National Trust, said it was "much depleted when it came to the Trust". Its state rooms were almost empty, but as well as many paintings and items of furniture belonging to the Onslow family, the house also contained some 18th-century porcelain, textiles and furniture donated by Hannah Gubbay, a member of the Sassoon family.

=== 1968 – 2014 ===
It was extensively restored and redecorated between 1968 and 1970 by the interior designer John Fowler, who set out to "capture the spirit of the rooms and its period rather than to replicate exact historical detail". Other pieces were acquired from the National Trust's extensive collections, and notable antiques that had a long-standing association with the property were also bought for display in the house. Many historians have criticised Fowler's design choices at Clandon House. Merlin Waterson admits "he was not given clear enough guidance on what was historically appropriate". However, Neil Cossons, a historian and museum director, has said "[Fowler] was ever anxious to avoid the 'dead hand of the restorer'. In these interiors nothing jarred and they were completely in keeping with the romantic taste of the period". In 1978, a parterre designed by John Fowler and Paul Miles was laid out on the south front, replacing early 20th-century flower beds.

By the 2000s, the house contained, among other things, the Ivo Forde Meissen collection of Italian comedy figures, Mortlake tapestries, and other rich textiles and carpets. Due to its extensive costs of upkeep, the National Trust gained a marriage licence for the property, and it had become a popular local wedding venue. It was also in part or whole rented out occasionally to the media for various productions, including 2008's The Duchess starring Keira Knightley.

In their 2012 At Risk Register, English Heritage described the park still owned by the Earl of Onslow as highly vulnerable, with extensive significant problems, and "unsympathetically managed thus affecting the overall integrity of the design and the setting of the house". Discussions about the development of a proposed business park were ongoing.

=== 2015 fire ===
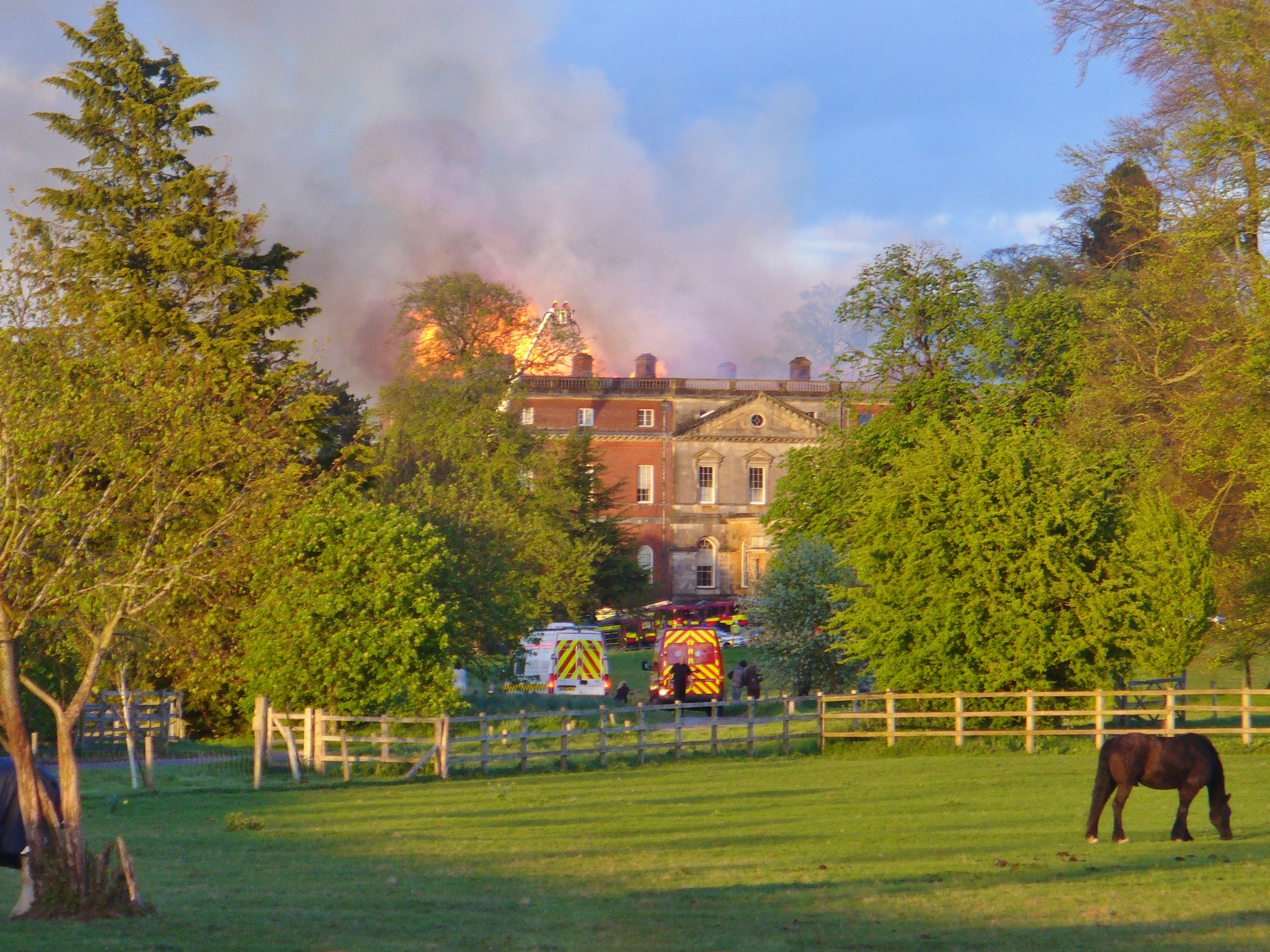
House on fire in April 2015

On the afternoon of 29 April 2015, a fire started in the house's basement and quickly spread to the roof. At 16:09, Surrey Fire and Rescue Service received an emergency call, and the fire was subsequently attended by a total of 16 fire engines and more than 80 personnel. While fire fighters tackled the blaze, National Trust volunteers were joined by conservators in salvaging furniture and works of art, with around 600 "significant items" rescued. The fire and rescue service remained at the property for a further ten days until the fire had been fully extinguished and then began an investigation into the cause of the fire.

Although a significant number of items were salvaged, the house was left "essentially a shell" according to Dame Helen Ghosh, director general of the National Trust. The roof, ceilings and floors had fallen into the basement, leaving just one room intact. One of the footballs kicked across no-man's land on the first day of the Battle of the Somme in 1916 was among the thousands of historic items destroyed, but the six Victoria Crosses thought to have been destroyed were replicas – the originals were held in a bank vault. Although some paintings and furniture were rescued by staff, many tapestries and some items of porcelain were heavily damaged. A large portrait of Richard Onslow, 1st Baron Onslow who was Speaker of the House of Commons in the early 18th century, was saved after being cut from its frame. Among the items workers prioritised to rescue were the regimental colours. An official investigation concluded that the fire was probably caused by a fault on an electrical distribution board in the basement.

== Restoration project ==
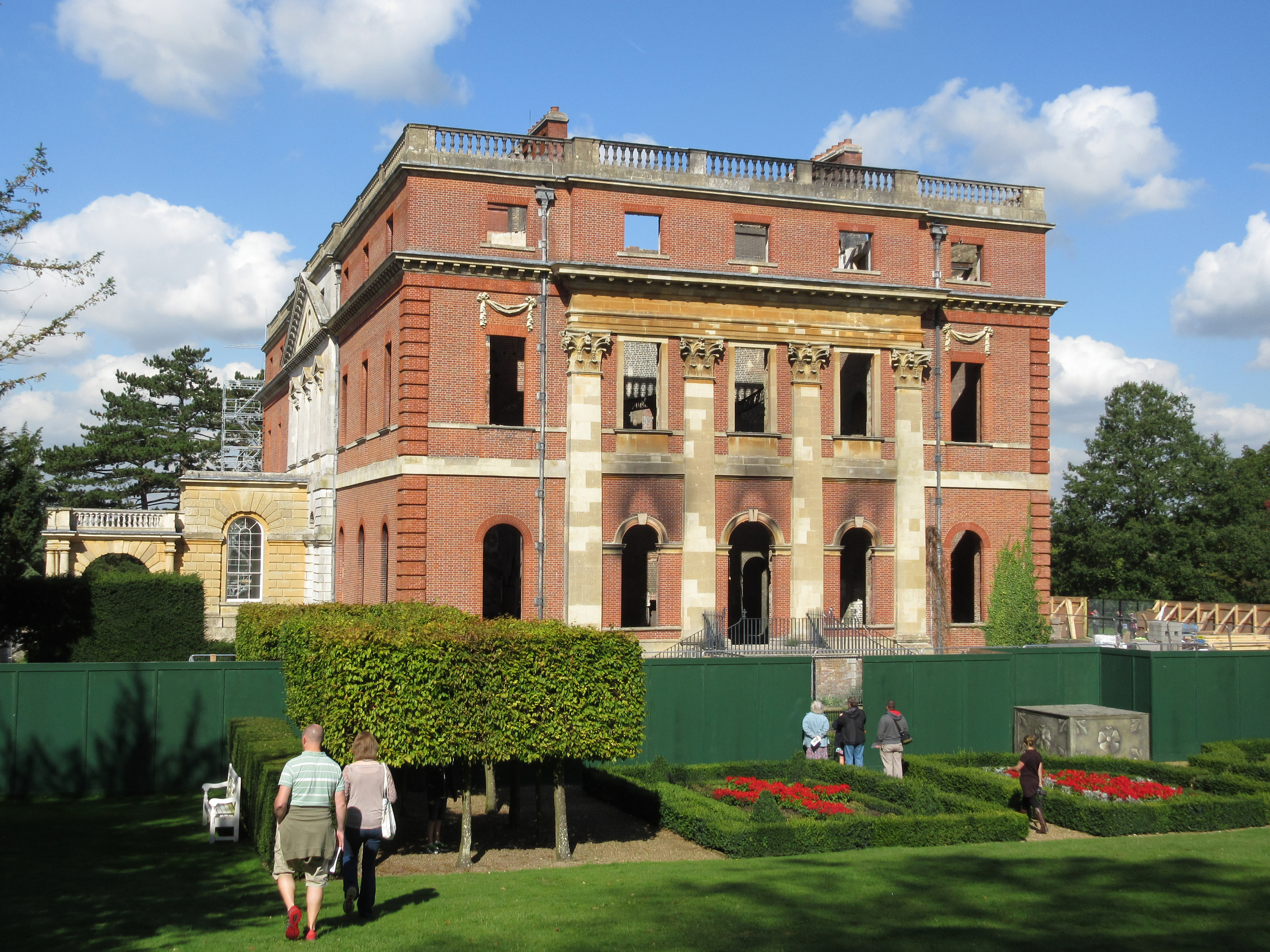
Burnt-out shell of Clandon Park

In January 2016, the National Trust announced that a number of the principal rooms were going to be restored to the original 18th-century designs, and the "less architecturally significant" upper floors were to be fully modernised for holding exhibitions, events and performances. The cost of the restoration work is being funded by an insurance payout estimated at £65 million. A spokesman for the trust said it would also be asking supporters for donations to cover any shortfall in the budget.

Rupert Onslow, 8th Earl of Onslow who owns and manages Clandon Park, whose family were the last private owners of Clandon House, criticised the decision to build "a replica" of the house, saying the money might be better spent on adding properties in need of genuine conservation to the National Trust's collection. The Earl said, "Clandon is lost. It's a ruin now. It decayed instantly. If the National Trust wants a replica, let them build it somewhere else." He also said that the last thing he wanted was a "Vulgar mock-Georgian footballers' wives house." However, the trust said the insurance policy did not allow it to spend the money elsewhere, and it could only be spent at Clandon. The Georgian Group welcomed the decision, calling the fire a national tragedy, and lending support for the restoration project, but reversed its position in September 2017 when the shortlist of design teams being considered for the restoration, and their initial proposals, were revealed.

In December 2017, architects Allies and Morrison were unanimously chosen as the winner of an international design competition to restore Clandon Park House.

In 2022, the Trust announced its intention to drop the previously announced restoration project on account of few original features surviving, in favour of only restoring the Speaker's Parlour (the only room to survive the fire intact) and the external walls and the windows, while the exterior of the building would appear as it did before the blaze. The inside of the house would be conserved in its ruined state and made accessible to the public by installing new walkways to provide a unique insight into the construction of an 18th-century stately home. The Trust also plans to add a new rooftop terrace, offering views of the surrounding countryside. The plans were approved by Guildford Borough Council, and building work is expected to start in autumn 2025 and be completed by 2029.

== Maori meeting house ==
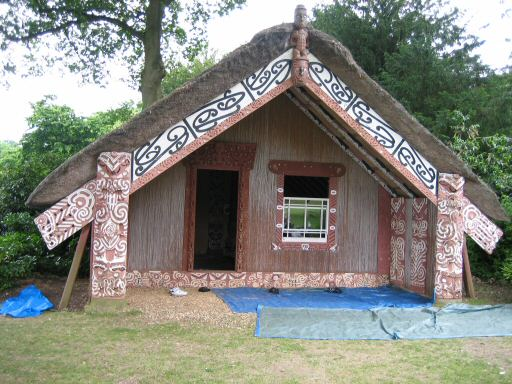
Hinemihi, the Māori meeting house

A Māori meeting house or wharenui named Hinemihi stands in the gardens. It was originally situated near Lake Tarawera in New Zealand and provided shelter to the people of Te Wairoa village during the eruption of Mount Tarawera in 1886. The building was covered in ash and surrounded by volcanic debris, but its occupants survived. It remained half buried until 1892 when William Onslow, 4th Earl of Onslow, then Governor General of New Zealand, bought it and had it fully restored and shipped to England. There are only three other Māori meeting houses outside New Zealand.

The National Trust has refurbished the Maori meeting house, replacing the roof, cleaning and repainting carvings, and replacing carvings that were lost. The roof is thatched, based on a misinterpretation of a photograph of the house covered in ash. Its original roof was of shingles. The New Zealand Historic Places Trust and the British Museum were consulted over this work. The meeting house is still important for cultural activities among the Māori. The nature of Hinemihi and its meaning for the local and expatriate Maori community in London was explored by Cecilie Gravesen in her experimental film Between Humans and Other Things (2010). During the 2012 Summer Olympics, the New Zealand team visited Hinemihi.

== Surrey Infantry Museum ==
Colonel JW Sewell reached agreement with the National Trust to re-establish the Queen's Royal Surrey Regiment Museum at Clandon House. The museum opened in 1981 with exhibits including uniforms, medals, weapons, regalia, photographs and memorabilia. The regiment's archives and library are located at the Surrey History Centre in Woking. After being upgraded in 2001, in July 2011 with part funding from the Heritage Lottery Fund the museum merged with those of the Princess of Wales's Royal Regiment and the Queen's Royal Surrey Regiment to become the Surrey Infantry Museum. The museum's displayed medal collection included six Victoria Crosses, including those awarded to: Lieutenant Wallace Duffield Wright; Lance Corporal Leonard James Keyworth; Corporal John McNamara; Second Lieutenant Arthur James Terence Fleming-Sandes. The museum, housed in the basement, was totally destroyed in the fire.

== Bibliography ==
- Harrison, Frederic. Annals of an Old Manor House: Sutton Place, Guildford. London, 1899. archive.org on-line text
- Howard Colvin, Biographical Dictionary of British Architects
