= Royal Anglian Regiment =

Infantry regiment of the British Army

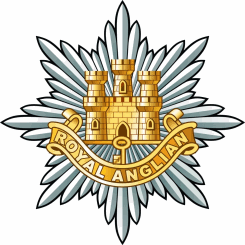
- Active: 1 September 1964 – present
- Allegiance: United Kingdom
- Branch: British Army
- Type: Line infantry
- Role: 1st Battalion - Light Infantry; 2nd Battalion – Light Mechanised Infantry; 3rd Battalion – Army Reserve
- Size: Three battalions
- Part of: Queen's Division
- Garrison/HQ: Regimental Headquarters - Bury St Edmunds; 1st Battalion – Kendrew Barracks, Cottesmore, Rutland; 2nd Battalion – Kendrew Barracks; 3rd Battalion – Bury St Edmunds
- Nicknames: The Vikings (1st Battalion); The Poachers (2nd Battalion); The Steelbacks (3rd Battalion)
- Motto: Regimental Motto: Stabilis
- March: Quick – Rule Britannia/Speed the Plough; Slow – The Northamptonshire
- Anniversaries: 1 August – Minden Day; 1 September – Regimental Formation Day
- Website: www.army.mod.uk/who-we-are/corps-regiments-and-units/infantry/royal-anglian-regiment/

Commanders
- Colonel-in-Chief: Prince Richard, Duke of Gloucester
- Colonel of the Regiment: Major General Dominic James Stead Biddick

Insignia
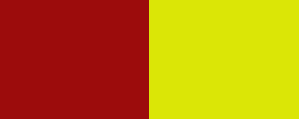
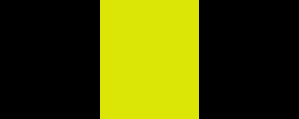
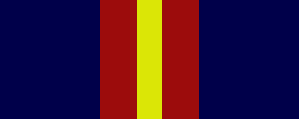
- Tactical Recognition Flashes
- Arm Badge: Salamanca Eagle; From the Essex Regiment
- Abbreviation: R ANGLIAN

The Royal Anglian Regiment is an infantry regiment of the British Army. It consists of two Regular battalions and one Reserve battalion. The modern regiment was formed in 1964, making it the oldest of the line regiments now operating in the British Army, and can trace its history back to 1685. The regiment was the first of the large infantry regiments and is one of the six regiments of the Queen's Division.

== History ==
=== Formation ===
The regiment was formed on 1 September 1964 as the first of the new large infantry regiments, through the amalgamation of the four regiments of the East Anglian Brigade:

- 1st (Norfolk and Suffolk) Battalion from the 1st Battalion of the 1st East Anglian Regiment (Royal Norfolk and Suffolk)
- 2nd (Duchess of Gloucester's Own Lincolnshire and Northamptonshire) Battalion – 1st Battalion, 2nd East Anglian Regiment (Duchess of Gloucester's Own Royal Lincolnshire and Northamptonshire)
- 3rd (16th/44th Foot) Battalion – 1st Battalion, 3rd East Anglian Regiment (16th/44th Foot)
- 4th (Leicestershire) Battalion – 1st Battalion, Royal Leicestershire Regiment.

The Royal Anglian Regiment was established to serve as the county regiment for the following counties:

- Bedfordshire
- Cambridgeshire
- Essex
- Hertfordshire
- Leicestershire
- Lincolnshire
- Norfolk
- Northamptonshire
- Rutland
- Suffolk

Initially formed of seven battalions (four regular and three Territorial Army), the regiment was reduced in 1975 with the loss of the 4th (Leicestershire) Battalion to three regular battalions and three TA. The regiment was reduced again in 1992 to two regular and two TA battalions with the loss of the 3rd (16th/44th Foot) and 5th Battalions.

The remaining Territorial battalion of the regiment, the East of England Regiment was re-designated on 1 April 2006 as the 3rd Battalion, Royal Anglian Regiment as part of the reforms.

=== Early operational history ===
==== Northern Ireland ====
The regiment carried out a series of tours-of-duty throughout "the Troubles" in Northern Ireland.

==== Yugoslav Wars ====
During the Yugoslav Wars, the 2nd Battalion was deployed to Bosnia in April 1994 as part of the United Nations peacekeeping force UNPROFOR. During the tour, Corporal Andrew Rainey became one of the first ever non-officers to be awarded the Military Cross, for his actions during a heavy contact between 3 Platoon, A Company and a Bosnian Serb Army unit on the confrontation line in the north of the Maglaj Finger.

==== Croatia ====
In 1995 the 1st Battalion was sent to Croatia as part of 24 Airmobile Brigade between July and October of that year. The Vikings returned to the UK having suffered no casualties.

==== Sierra Leone ====
Shortly after British forces intervened in Sierra Leone during its civil war, the 2nd Battalion briefly joined the IMATT force in June 2000 to help train the Sierra Leonean armed forces.

=== Recent operational history ===
==== Afghanistan ====
===== Operation Fingal =====
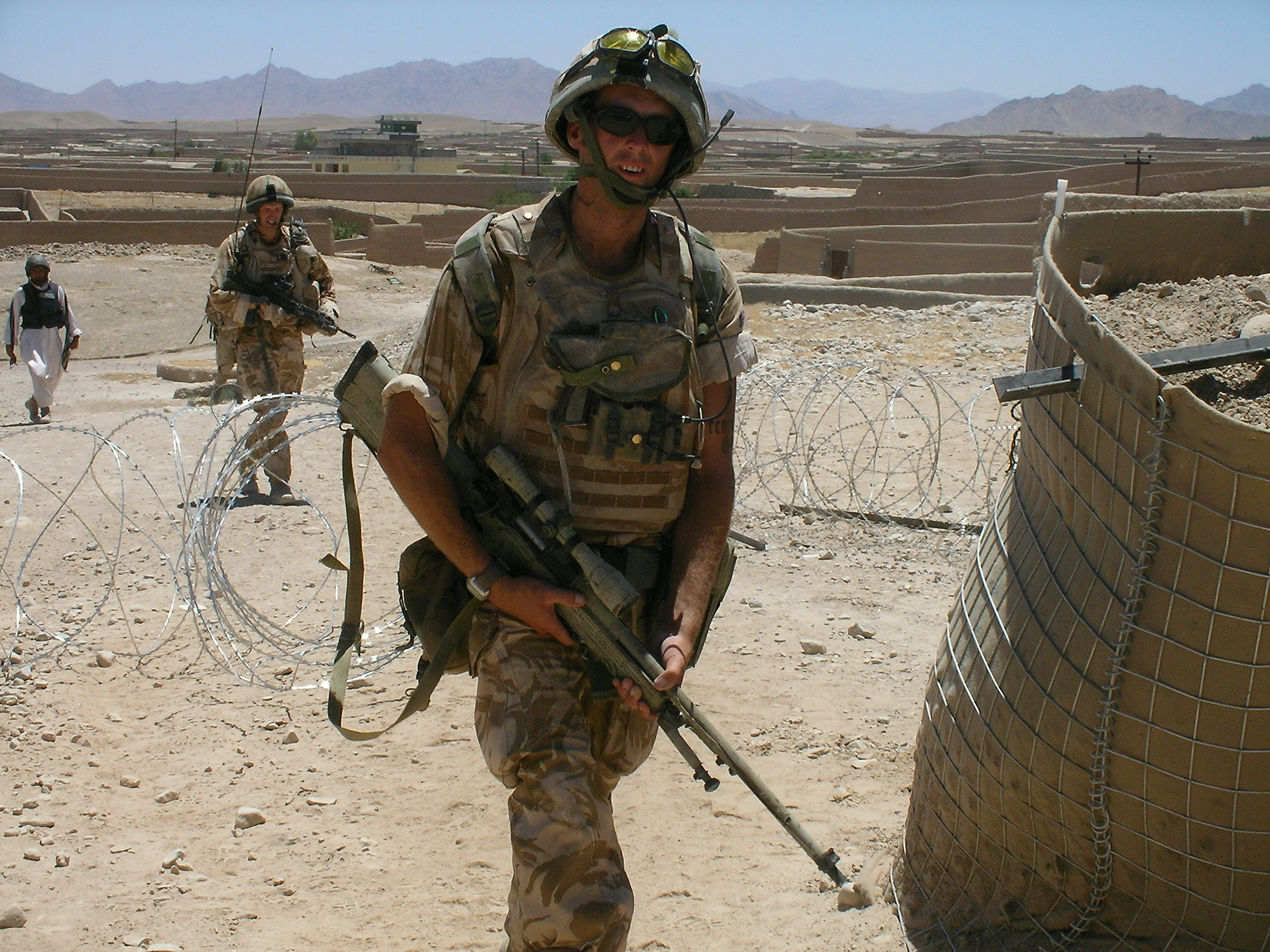
Royal Anglian Regiment in Afghanistan

In March 2002, a majority of the 1st Battalion were sent to Afghanistan as part of Operation Fingal which involved military leadership and the provision of a 2,000-strong contingent to coalition forces in Afghanistan. The battalion was based in the capital Kabul as part of the International Security Assistance Force (ISAF). The following February, the 2nd Battalion's A Company were posted to Kabul and were replaced by C Company in June.

===== Operation Herrick =====
From March to September 2007, as part of 12th Mechanised Brigade, 1st Battalion was deployed to Afghanistan as part of Operation Herrick 6. They were stationed in Helmand Province. This deployment was the subject of the Sky One documentary Ross Kemp in Afghanistan, broadcast in January/February 2008. A book, Attack State Red, published by Penguin in 2009, was written by Richard Kemp, a former commanding officer, about the battalion on this tour. The fighting attracted much media attention due to the ferocity of the combat, with soldiers often having to resort to using bayonets. The battalion suffered nine casualties during its tour, five from attacks and four accidental.

In a reported friendly fire incident, on 23 August 2007, one of a pair United States Air Force F-15E fighter aircraft called in to support a patrol of the 1st Battalion in Afghanistan dropped a bomb on the same patrol, killing three men, and severely injured two others. It was later revealed that the British forward air controller who called in the strike had not been issued a noise-cancelling headset, and in the confusion and stress of the battle incorrectly confirmed one wrong digit of the co-ordinates mistakenly repeated by the pilot, and the bomb landed on the British position 1,000 metres away from the enemy. The coroner at the soldiers' inquest stated that the incident was due to "flawed application of procedures" rather than individual errors or "recklessness".

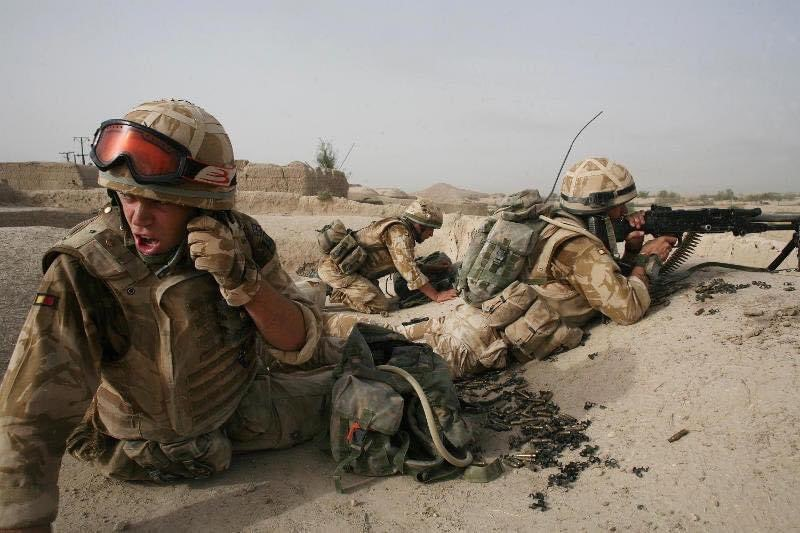
A patrol from the 1st Battalion in contact with insurgents during Operation Herrick 6

With very little notice the 1st Battalion would deploy again to Helmand Province in late 2009 where soldiers from 1st Battalion saw action guarding checkpoints in the Nad-e-Ali area, in central Helmand province later in the year. Deploying alongside them were elements of the sister 3rd Battalion, who deployed to Afghanistan as part of 11 Light Brigade in October 2009.

The 1st Battalion and elements of 3rd Battalion again deployed to Afghanistan as part of 12th Mechanised Brigade in March 2012 as part of Operation Herrick 16 in the closing stages of the conflict.

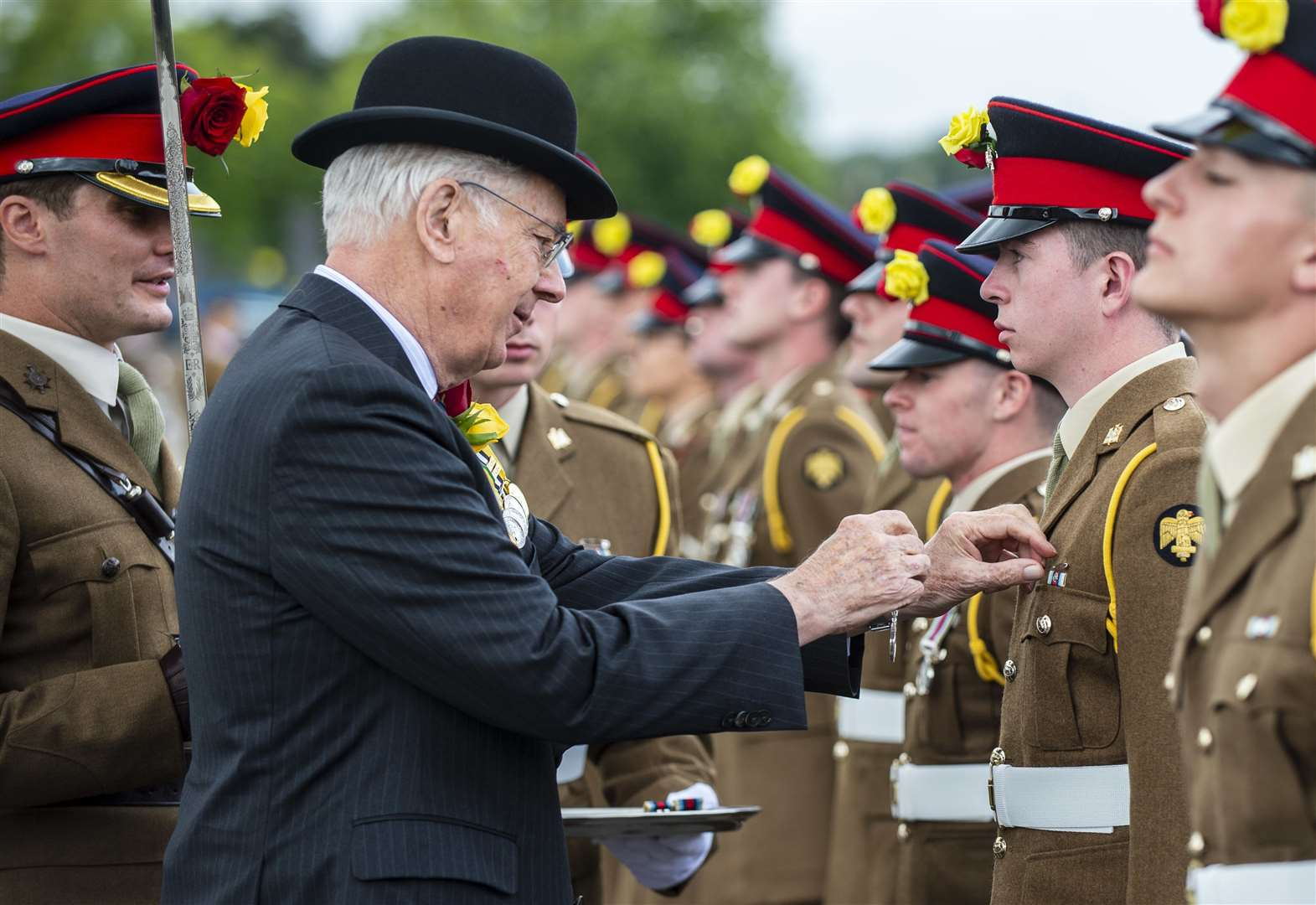
The Duke of Gloucester presents medals to members of the 1st Battalion on 1 August 2019, following Operation Toral 7; red and yellow roses are worn in the soldiers' hats to mark Minden Day

==== Iraq ====
In 2005, 1st Battalion undertook a tour in Iraq as part of Operation Telic 6 where the battle group was responsible for the Basra Rural South area of operations. C (Essex) Company was detached to act as a Brigade Operations Company and was involved in several high-profile arrest operations.

In Spring 2006, 2nd Battalion deployed to Iraq as part of Op Telic 8 and formed Basra City South Battlegroup. C (Northamptonshire) company was detached to operate as part of Force Reserve and was involved in many high-profile arrest and strike operations. During the tour the regiment mourned the loss of two soldiers; on 13 May 2006 Privates Joseva Lewaicei and Adam Morris died as a result of injuries sustained from a roadside bomb attack in Basra. A third soldier was badly injured.

==== Cyprus ====
In autumn 2017 the 2nd Battalion Royal Anglian Regiment deployed to Cyprus, assuming the role of Regional Standby Battalion and was held at very high readiness to deploy anywhere in the world. In August 2019 it returned to Kendrew Barracks in Rutland.

In summer 2021 the 1st Battalion deployed to Cyprus and, as with the 2nd Battalion in the years before, assumed the role of Regional Standby Battalion to be ready to deploy anywhere in the world. Elements of the battalion were deployed at short notice on Operation Pitting, helping to recover British nationals and Afghan refugees following the fall of Kabul to the Taliban.

=== Recent history ===
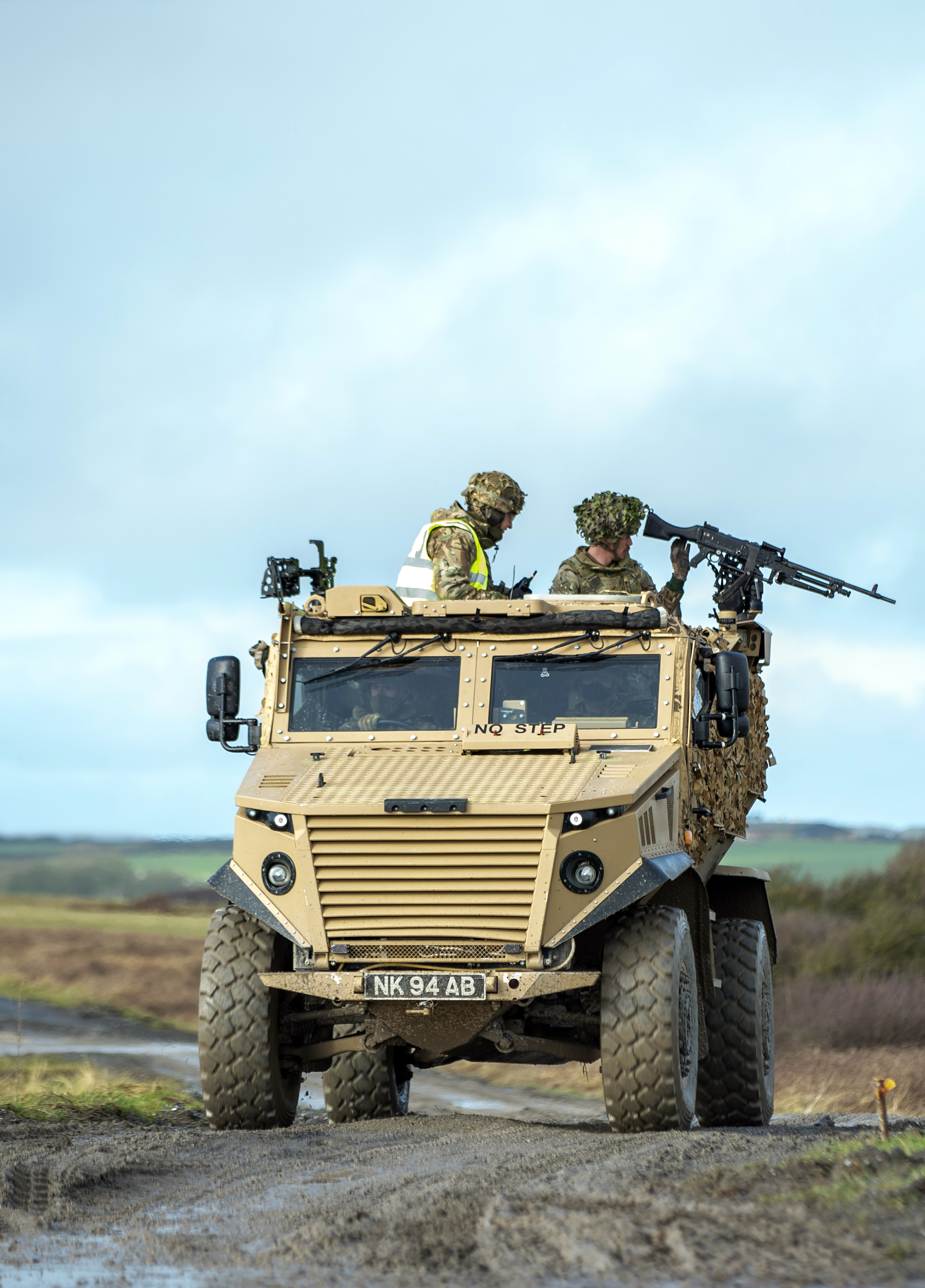
A Foxhound of 2 Royal Anglian on exercise at the Castlemartin Training Area, 2021

On 9 October 2019, 100 men from C and D companies marched through Haverhill and received the freedom of the town. The battalion was led by their commanding officer Lieutenant Colonel Phillip Moxey MBE. In 2020 during the 2019–20 coronavirus pandemic, members of the regiment helped assist the NHS for testing of COVID-19 patients, and provided checkpoints throughout London in collaboration with the Grenadier Guards. 1 Royal Anglian also helped build NHS Nightingale London, a temporary critical care hospital.

== Regimental museum ==
The Royal Anglian Regiment Museum is based at the Imperial War Museum Duxford in Cambridgeshire.

== Regimental ethos ==
The regimental ethos is as follows:

We are a county based Regiment bound together by a closely-knit family spirit. Our approach is classless, based on mutual respect and trust, where developing and believing in our soldiers is paramount. We are a forward looking, self-starting and welcoming team for whom the mission remains key.

== Structure ==
In 1995, each battalion renamed its companies in order to perpetuate its lineage from the old county regiments. The current structure is as follows:

1st Battalion, The Royal Anglian Regiment 'The Vikings'

- A (Royal Norfolk) Company
- B (Suffolk) Company
- C (Essex) Company
- D (Cambridgeshire) Company

Following the Future Soldier announcements, the 1st Battalion moved to Kendrew Barracks, Cottesmore, Rutland, as part of 11th Security Force Assistance Brigade and re-roled to a Security Force Assistance (SFA) role. This move saw the 1st and 2nd Battalions based together for the first time. 11th SFA Brigade was redesignated 11th Brigade in 2024, transitioning back to Field Army Troops, with the combat role of tactical recce-strike.

2nd Battalion, The Royal Anglian Regiment 'The Poachers'

- A (Royal Lincolnshire) Company
- B (Royal Leicestershire) Company
- C (Northamptonshire) Company
- D (Bedfordshire and Hertfordshire) Company
- HQ (Rutland) Company

The 2nd Battalion operates in the Light Mechanised Infantry role, as part of 7th Light Mechanised Brigade Combat Team, and is currently based at Kendrew Barracks.

3rd Battalion, Royal Anglian Regiment "The Steelbacks"

- 1 (Norfolk) Company
- 2 (Leicestershire & Northamptonshire) Company
- 3 (Essex) Company
- 4 (Lincolnshire) Company
- HQ (Suffolk & Cambridgeshire) Company

The 3rd Battalion operates in the light infantry role under 7th Infantry Brigade and Headquarters East and is based at Bury St Edmunds.

Under the new rotations announced in Future Soldier the 2nd Battalion continued to rotate as a resident unit of British Forces Cyprus.

== Battalion nicknames ==
The battalion nicknames are as follows:

The Vikings – 1st Battalion

The nickname stems from the late 1960s when the commanding officer of the 1st Battalion, The 1st East Anglian Regiment Lt Col A F Campbell, MC said it described the Nordic influence on the counties of Norfolk and Suffolk. The nickname stuck, was adopted by the 1st Battalion on formation, and is still widely used today.

The Poachers – 2nd Battalion

This stems from the Regimental March, The Lincolnshire Poacher, of one of their predecessors, the Royal Lincolnshire Regiment.

The Steelbacks – 3rd Battalion

This was the nickname of the 58th Regiment of Foot, later the 2nd Battalion the Northamptonshire Regiment. It was subsequently the nickname of the former 5th (Volunteer) Battalion, Royal Anglian Regiment. It stems from Private Hovenden of the 58th being described as a 'Steelback' after a flogging in 1813.

The Pompadours – Disbanded 3rd Battalion

This was the nickname of the 56th (West Essex) Regiment of Foot, an infantry regiment in the British Army, active from 1755 to 1881. The regiment was originally uniformed with a deep crimson facing colour, which in 1764 was changed to purple. During the 18th century the fugitive nature of the dye required to produce this unusual military colour produced varying shades. The colour was often called "pompadour", from which the regiment's nickname of "The Pompadours" came. The reasons for the name of the colour are unclear; it is often said that the shade was Madame de Pompadour's favourite colour. Some soldiers of the regiment preferred to claim that it was the colour of her underwear.

The Tigers – Disbanded 4th Battalion

This was the nickname of the Leicestershire Regiment (Royal Leicestershire Regiment after 1946), a line infantry regiment with a history going back to 1688. In 1804 the regiment moved to India, and remained there until 1823. In 1825 the regiment was granted the badge of a "royal tiger" to recall their long service in the sub-continent. (Note: The London Gazette stating "24 June 1825: His Majesty has been pleased to approve of the 17th or Leicestershire Regiment of foot bearing on its colours and appointments the figure of the "Royal Tiger," with the word "Hindoostan" superscribed, as a lasting testimony of the exemplary conduct of the Corps during its period of service in India, in the year 1804 to 1823.")

== Traditions ==
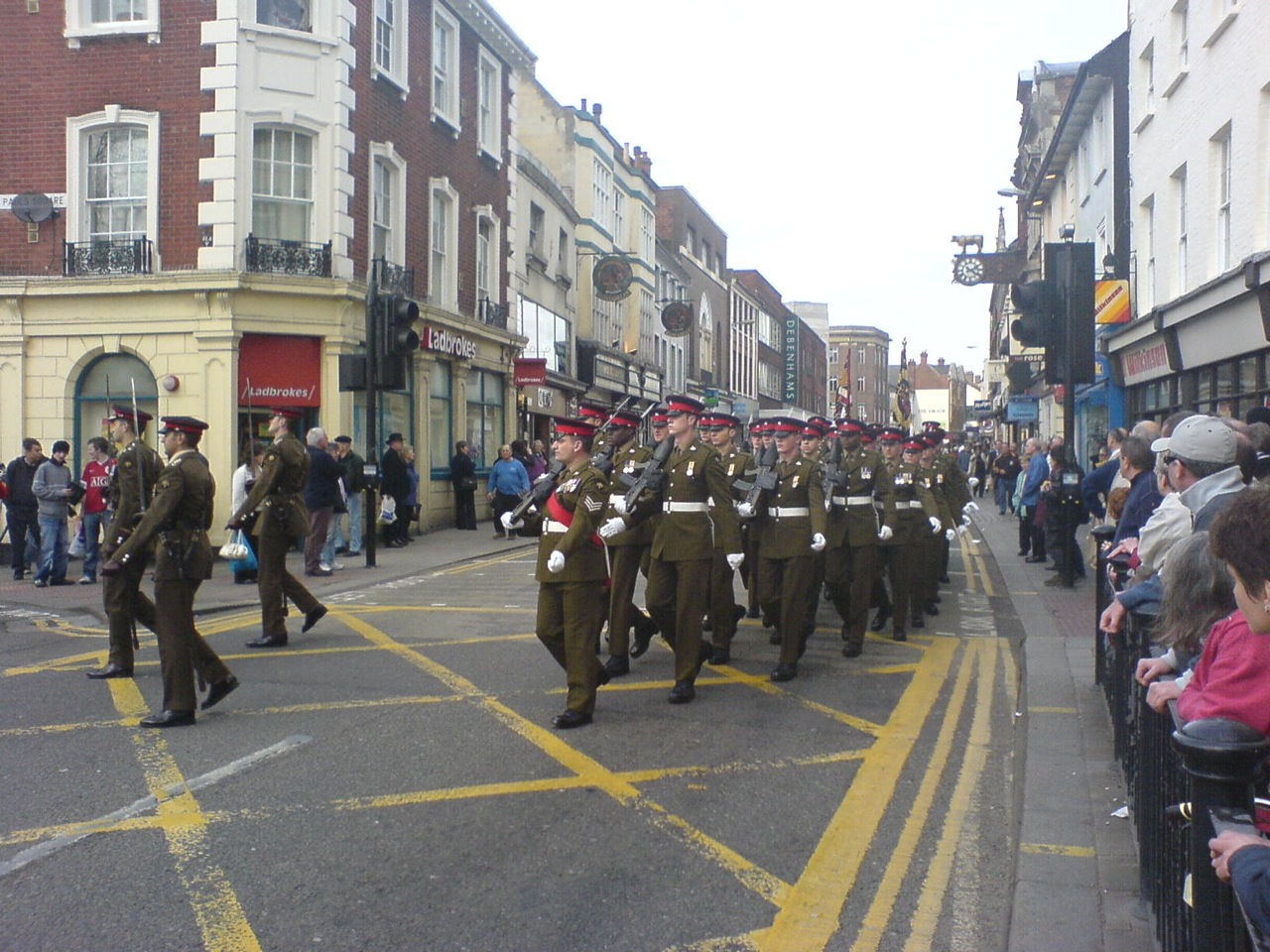
March past in Bedford

=== Marches ===
The regimental marches are as follows:

- Regimental quick march: Rule Britannia and Speed the Plough – the former inherited from the Royal Norfolk Regiment
- Regimental slow march: The Northamptonshire

=== Regimental days ===
The regimental days are as follows:
The Regiment

- 1 September – The Royal Anglian Regiment Formation Day

The 1st Battalion

- 1 August – Minden Day

The 2nd Battalion

- 27 July – Talavera Day

Celebrated by the individual battalions (in date order)

- 2nd Battalion: 10 February – Sobraon Day
- 1st Battalion: 17 March – St Patrick's Day
- 1st Battalion: 25 April – Almanza Day
- 2nd Battalion: 25 June – Hindoostan Day
- 1st Battalion: 27 June – Dettingen Day
- 1st Battalion: 22 July – Salamanca Day
- 2nd Battalion: 27 July – Talavera Day
- 1st Battalion: 1 August – Minden Day
- 2nd Battalion: 13 August – Blenheim Day

=== Uniform ===
Uniforms are as follows:

Cap badge
The cap badge consists of the garter star, a silver star of eight points, denoting the royal status of the regiment. Mounted upon which, is the castle of Gibraltar with a scroll inscribed 'ROYAL ANGLIAN' in gold. The Suffolks, Essex and Northamptonshire Regiments served at the Great Siege of Gibraltar from 1779 to 1783, the key identifies that Gibraltar was the "key to the Mediterranean".

Beret
The 1st Battalion the Royal Norfolk Regiment joined 24th Guards Independent Brigade Group in 1942; the Guards officers wore a khaki beret and the Norfolks adopted it at the time. The beret went out of use after the war but was re-adopted in 1960, and has continued in use. It was adopted by the rest of the Royal Anglian Regiment in 1970 and the wearing of it extended to warrant officers. The complete regiment went to khaki berets in 1976.

Black patch
The black patch behind the cap badge commemorates the burial of Sir John Moore at Corunna in 1809 by officers and men of the 9th of Foot (which became the Norfolk Regiment), the rearguard of the withdrawing British Expeditionary Force.

Tactical recognition flashes (TRFs)
The 1st Battalion wear the red and yellow Minden Flash. It originates from the Suffolk Regiment who adopted it after Dunkirk; it symbolises the red and yellow of the roses at the Battle of Minden. The 2nd Battalion wear the black, yellow, black of the Bedfordshire and Hertfordshire Regiment. The 3rd Battalion wear the Regimental colours, blue, red and yellow.

Eagle
The Salamanca Eagle is worn on the left sleeve on No. 1 and No 2 dress tunics. It is a replica of the French 62nd Regiment's French Imperial Eagle standard which was captured by the 2/44th (East Essex) Regiment of Foot at the Battle of Salamanca during the Peninsular War. The Eagle is mounted on a backing of Pompadour purple, representing the 3rd Battalion The Royal Anglian Regiment (The Pompadours) disbanded in 1992. The British Army captured a total of six of Napoleon's eagles (two at Salamanca, two at Madrid and two at Waterloo), four of which were taken with bayonet. The original eagle is still held in the Essex Regiment Museum and is displayed in the 1st Battalion on Salamanca Day.

Collar badges
The 1st Battalion wear a figure of Britannia superimposed on a castle and key. Britannia was awarded to the Norfolk Regiment for service at the Battle of Almansa and the castle was the cap badge of the Suffolk Regiment, commemorating the siege of Gibraltar. The 2nd Battalion wear the sphinx with underneath a scroll inscribed 'TALAVERA'. The sphinx is from the Royal Lincolnshire Regiment, for service in Egypt, 'TALAVERA' is from the 48th (Northamptonshire) Regiment of Foot's role at that 1809 battle. The 3rd Battalion wear the cap badge as their collar badge.

Lanyards
The lanyard of the 1st Battalion is yellow from the Royal Norfolk Regiment. The 2nd Battalion wear black to commemorate the Northamptonshire Regiment. The 3rd Battalion wears the black and primrose yellow lanyard of the former Bedfordshire and Hertfordshire Regiment.

Buttons
All ranks wear the Royal Leicestershire Regiment buttons, a tiger surrounded by an unbroken laurel wreath. The tiger is in memory of the regiment's service in India, the wreath commemorates the Battle of Princeton in the American War of Independence.

=== Band ===
The first trace of a band within the Northamptonshire Regiment was recorded in 1798, during which a "German bandmaster was engaged". Military bands have continued in this regiment over the years after Territorial Army battalions of the former regiments were affiliated were merged. In 1986, the first women were recruited into the band from the Women's Royal Army Corps. In 1996, the 5th Battalion of the Royal Anglian Regiment was reorganized with the regimental council electing to keep the band, under the name of the Band of the Royal Anglian Regiment following the amalgamation of the Regular Royal Anglian bands into the Bands of the Queen's Division.

== Order of precedence ==
Preceded by Royal Regiment of Fusiliers	Infantry Order of Precedence	Succeeded by Royal Yorkshire Regiment

== Lineage ==
1880	1881 Childers Reforms	1957 Defence White Paper	Large regiment formation
9th (East Norfolk) Regiment of Foot	The Norfolk Regiment renamed in 1935: The Royal Norfolk Regiment	1st East Anglian Regiment (Royal Norfolk and Suffolk)	The Royal Anglian Regiment
12th (East Suffolk) Regiment of Foot	The Suffolk Regiment	1st East Anglian Regiment (Royal Norfolk and Suffolk)	The Royal Anglian Regiment
10th (North Lincoln) Regiment of Foot	The Lincolnshire Regiment renamed in 1946: The Royal Lincolnshire Regiment	2nd East Anglian Regiment (Duchess of Gloucester's Own Royal Lincolnshire and Northamptonshire)	The Royal Anglian Regiment
48th (Northamptonshire) Regiment of Foot	The Northamptonshire Regiment	2nd East Anglian Regiment (Duchess of Gloucester's Own Royal Lincolnshire and Northamptonshire)	The Royal Anglian Regiment
58th (Rutlandshire) Regiment of Foot	The Northamptonshire Regiment	2nd East Anglian Regiment (Duchess of Gloucester's Own Royal Lincolnshire and Northamptonshire)	The Royal Anglian Regiment
16th (Bedfordshire) Regiment of Foot	The Bedfordshire Regiment renamed in 1919: The Bedfordshire and Hertfordshire Regiment	3rd East Anglian Regiment (16th/44th Foot)	The Royal Anglian Regiment
44th (East Essex) Regiment of Foot	The Essex Regiment	3rd East Anglian Regiment (16th/44th Foot)	The Royal Anglian Regiment
56th (West Essex) Regiment of Foot	The Essex Regiment	3rd East Anglian Regiment (16th/44th Foot)	The Royal Anglian Regiment
17th (Leicestershire) Regiment of Foot	The Leicestershire Regiment renamed The Royal Leicestershire Regiment in 1946		The Royal Anglian Regiment

== Alliances ==
The regiment's alliances are as follows:

- Canada – Lincoln and Welland Regiment, Essex and Kent Scottish, Lake Superior Scottish Regiment and Sherbrooke Hussars
- Australia – Royal Tasmania Regiment
- New Zealand – Auckland (Countess of Ranfurly's Own) and Northland Regiment
- Pakistan – 5th Battalion, The Frontier Force Regiment
- Malaysia – 1st Battalion, The Royal Malay Regiment
- Barbados – Barbados Regiment
- South Africa – Chief Makhanda Regiment, General de la Rey Regiment
- Bermuda – Royal Bermuda Regiment
- Gibraltar – The Royal Gibraltar Regiment
- Belize – The Belize Defence Force
- Royal Navy – HMS St Albans

=== The Royal Bermuda Regiment ===
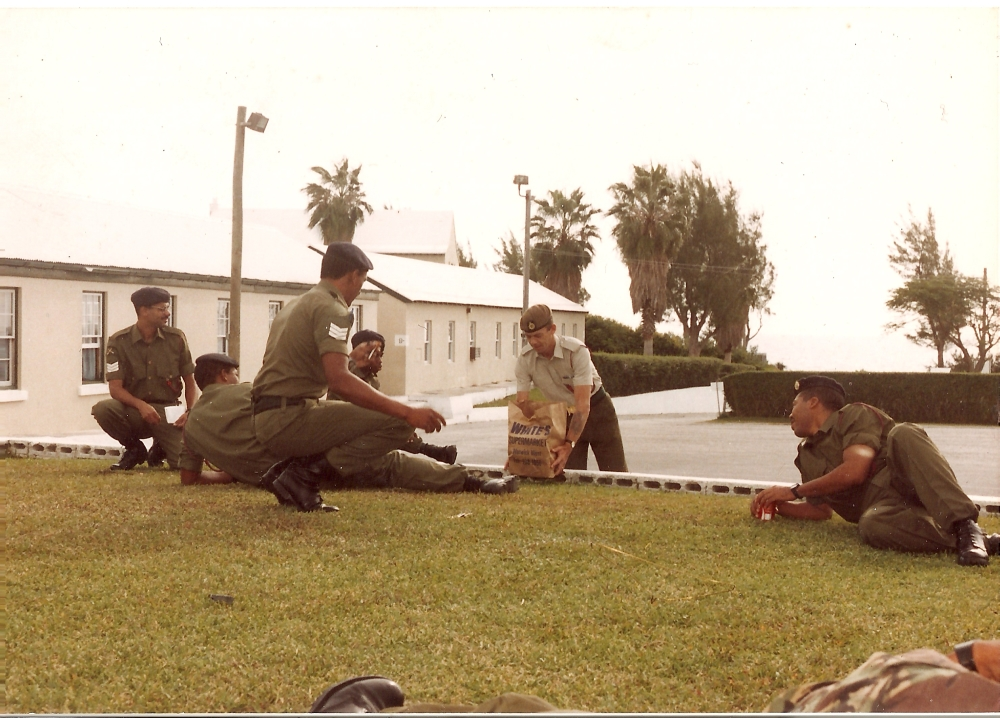
A Permanent Staff Instructor (PSI), seconded from the Royal Anglians, with senior Non-Commissioned Officers of the Royal Bermuda Regiment. The PSI wears a Royal Bermuda Regiment cap badge on a Royal Anglian khaki beret. The Royal Anglian Regiment provides a PSI to each of the Royal Bermuda Regiment's companies, as well as to the companies of its own Territorial Army battalion.

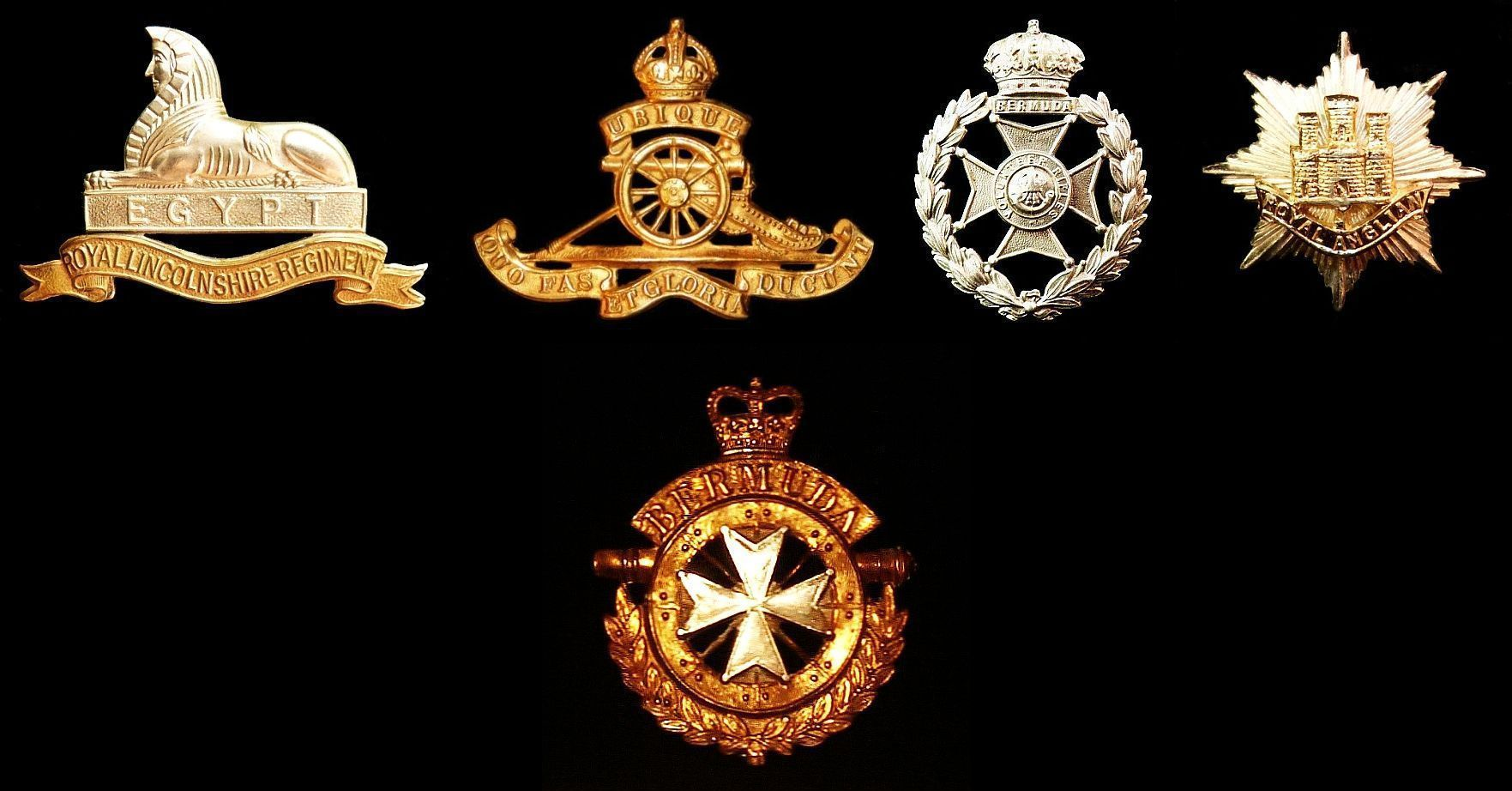
The badge of the Royal Anglian Regiment (right) and of one of its predecessors, the Royal Lincolnshire Regiment (left), the Royal Bermuda Regiment (bottom), and both of its predecessors, the Bermuda Militia Artillery (Royal Artillery) and the Bermuda Volunteer Rifle Corps (second and third from left).

The Royal Anglian Regiment has a unique relationship with the Royal Bermuda Regiment (RBR), a Territorial battalion of the British Overseas Territory of Bermuda (which was designated an Imperial fortress until the 1950s, with the Royal Naval Dockyard, Bermuda reduced to a base in 1951, the naval Commander-in-Chief of the America and West Indies Station abolished with the station in 1956, and the Bermuda Command Headquarters and all regular units and detachments of the garrison withdrawn in 1957). Although the Royal Bermuda Regiment is usually described as an affiliated regiment, its relationship to the regiment is more akin to that of one of Royal Anglian's own TA battalions. One of the two units that amalgamated in 1965 to form the Royal Bermuda Regiment, the Bermuda Volunteer Rifle Corps, sent two contingents (the first in June, 1915, merging with the second in 1916) to the Western Front, to support the Lincolnshire Regiment, during the First World War. It also sent two contingents (in 1940 and 1944) during the Second World War. The relationship would continue as both units were amalgamated in the 1960s, with Royal Anglian Regiment officers and warrant officers making contributing to the Royal Bermuda Regiment's Permanent Staff since it was formed by amalgamation in 1965 (providing the adjutant, and later the staff officer, permanent staff instructors and other roles from second-in-command to training wing warrant officer). Senior NCOs were also loaned to the Royal Bermuda Regiment for the duration of its annual recruit camps, with one attached to each platoon of its training company.

== Popular culture ==
In 1989, the Band and fifty members of the 3rd Battalion were featured in the opening and closing sequences of BBC historical sitcom Blackadder Goes Forth with the band, men and actors Rowan Atkinson, Hugh Laurie, Stephen Fry, Tony Robinson and Tim McInnerny dressed in First World War period uniforms marching to "The British Grenadiers" and the Blackadder theme song. It was shot on location at the former Colchester Cavalry Barracks.

== See also ==
- 6th (Volunteer) Battalion, Royal Anglian Regiment
- Gibraltar Barracks, Bury St Edmunds
