= Northamptonshire Regiment =

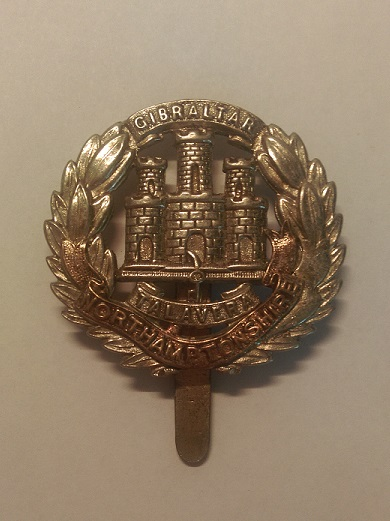
- Cap badge of the Northamptonshire Regiment.
- Active: 1881–1960
- Country: United Kingdom
- Branch: British Army
- Type: Infantry
- Role: Line infantry
- Size: 2 Regular battalions 1–2 Militia and Special Reserve battalions Up to 4 Volunteer and Territorial battalions Up to 8 Hostilities-only battalions
- Garrison/HQ: Gibraltar Barracks, Northamptonshire (1881–1939); Quebec Barracks, Northamptonshire (1939–1960)
- Colours: Black/Buff/Sky Blue

The Northamptonshire Regiment was a line infantry regiment of the British Army in existence from 1881 until 1960. In 1960, it was amalgamated with the Royal Lincolnshire Regiment to form the 2nd East Anglian Regiment (Duchess of Gloucester's Own Royal Lincolnshire and Northamptonshire), which was amalgamated with the 1st East Anglian Regiment (Royal Norfolk and Suffolk), the 3rd East Anglian Regiment (16th/44th Foot) and the Royal Leicestershire Regiment to form the present Royal Anglian Regiment.

== History ==
=== Formation ===
The Northamptonshire Regiment was formed as part of the reorganisation of the infantry by the Childers Reforms when the 48th (Northamptonshire) Regiment of Foot (raised in 1741) and the 58th (Rutlandshire) Regiment of Foot (raised in 1755) were redesignated as the 1st and 2nd battalions of the Northamptonshire Regiment, with the regimental depot at Northampton. The regiment was initially based at Gibraltar Barracks in Northampton.

As well as the two regular battalions, the Northampton and Rutland Militia became the 3rd (Militia) Battalion, and the 1st Northamptonshire Rifle Volunteer Corps became the 1st Volunteer Battalion.

In the years 1881–1914, the two regular battalions saw overseas service in Hong Kong, India, Singapore and South Africa. The 1st and 2nd Battalions of the regiment received battle honours for actions in the North West Frontier Province and the Second Boer War respectively; the 3rd Battalion also received an honour for South Africa. (Note: During the Boer War, the 2nd Battalion sailed for South Africa in October 1899.) (Note: 1st Battalion was in India from 1892 to 1910.) With the enactment of the Territorial and Reserve Forces Act 1907, the Militia and Volunteers were reorganised nationally, with the former becoming the Special Reserve (SR) and the latter the Territorial Force (TF). The regiment now had the 3rd (Reserve) and 4th (TF) battalions. The 4th Battalion had its own drill hall at Clare Street in Northampton

=== First World War ===
==== Regular Army ====
The 1st Battalion landed at Le Havre as part of 2nd Brigade in the 1st Division in August 1914 for service on the Western Front.

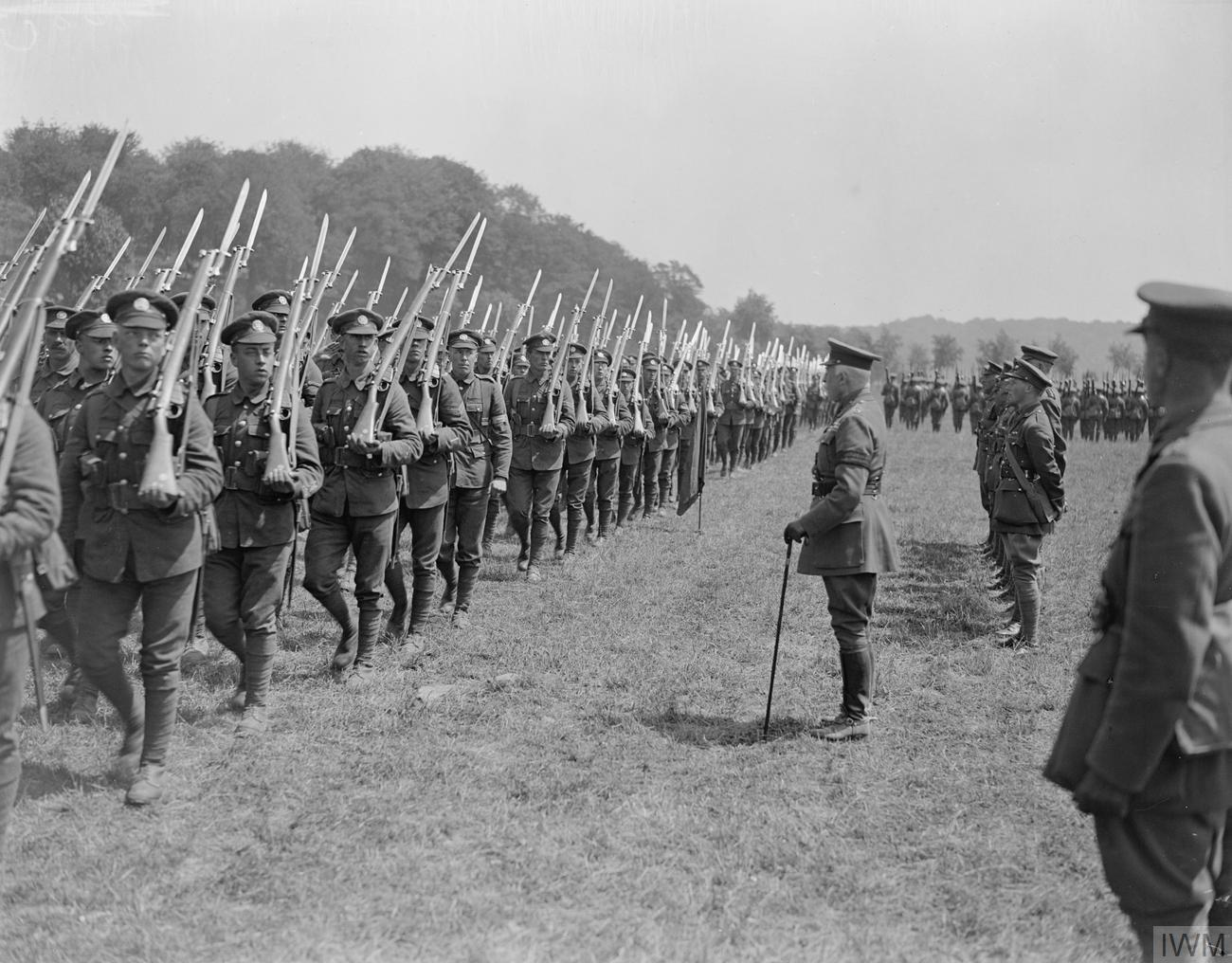
Troops of the 1st Battalion, Northamptonshire Regiment marching past Prince Arthur, the Duke of Connaught, at his inspection of the 2nd Brigade, near Bruay, 1 July 1918.

The 2nd Battalion, which had been in Alexandria, returned to England and then landed at Le Havre as part of the 24th Brigade in the 8th Division in November 1914 also for service on the Western Front.

==== Special Reserve ====
The 3rd Battalion moved to its war station in the Portland Garrison, where it carried out its dual role of coast defence and training reinforcements for the Regular battalions, and spun off the 8th (Service) Battalion (later 8th (Reserve) Battalion). It served at Sunderland in late 1914 at the time of the German Naval raid on North East England, and from June 1915 to the end of the war it was in the Thames & Medway Garrison, training thousands of reinforcements. Postwar it served briefly in Ireland during the Irish War of Independence before being demobilised.

==== Territorial Force ====
The 1/4th Battalion landed at Suvla Bay as part of the 162nd Brigade in the 54th (East Anglian) Division in August 1915; it was evacuated from Gallipoli in December 1915 and arrived at Alexandria and then served in Egypt and Palestine later.

==== New Armies ====
The 5th (Service) Battalion (Pioneers) landed in France as pioneer troops to the 12th (Eastern) Division in May 1915 for service on the Western Front.

The 6th (Service) Battalion landed in France as army troops to the 18th (Eastern) Division in July 1915 also for service on the Western Front.

The 7th (Service) Battalion landed at Boulogne-sur-Mer as part of the 73rd Brigade in the 24th Division in September 1915 also for service on the Western Front.

=== Between the wars ===
Between the two world wars, the regular battalions spent long periods in India, the 1st Battalion arriving there in 1932 and the 2nd Battalion arriving there in 1919. On 17 October 1935, a Royal Scot Class locomotive of the London, Midland and Scottish Railway was named The Northamptonshire Regiment at a ceremony at Northampton (Castle) Station. After Gibraltar Barracks became too dilapidated, the regiment re-located to Quebec Barracks at Wootton in 1939.

=== Second World War ===
==== Regular Army battalions ====
The 1st Battalion was a Regular Army unit that served in the Burma campaign and India throughout the war with the 32nd Indian Infantry Brigade, 20th Indian Infantry Division.

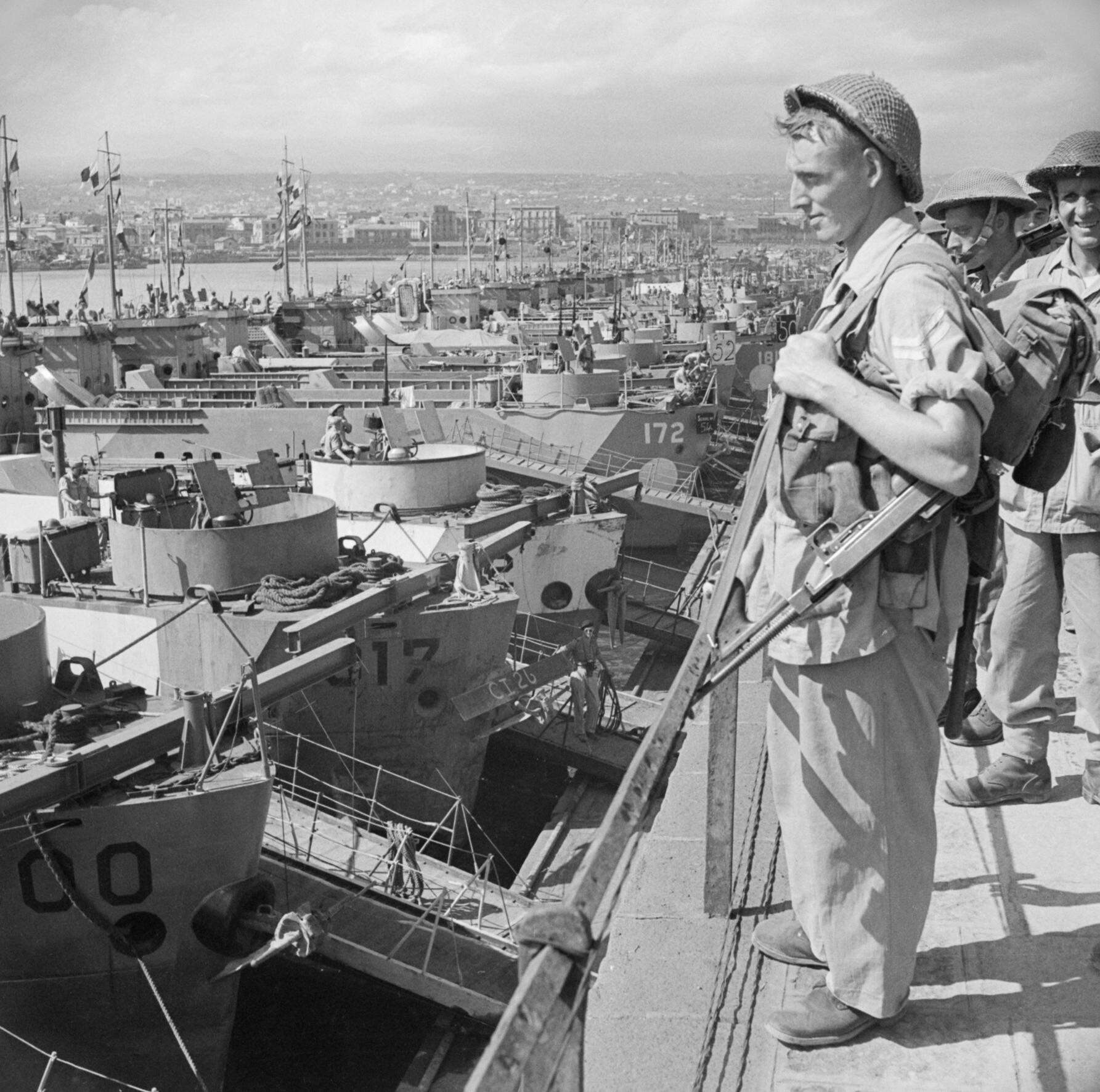
Troops from 2nd Battalion, Northamptonshire Regiment, part of the 17th Brigade of the 5th Division, wait to board landing craft at Catania, Sicily, for the invasion of Italy, 2 September 1943.

The 2nd Battalion, Northamptonshire Regiment was also part of the Regular Army. Throughout the war, the battalion was assigned to the 17th Infantry Brigade, alongside the 2nd Royal Scots Fusiliers and 2nd Seaforth Highlanders, part of the 5th Infantry Division. The battalion saw active service as part of the British Expeditionary Force (BEF) in the battles of Belgium and France and had to be evacuated at Dunkirk. After being evacuated to England, the battalion spent two years on home defence, re-training and re-equipping. 2nd Battalion then joined the forces sent to invade Madagascar in May 1942 and then travelled to India and overland to Persia (now Iran) and Iraq in September of the same year. It travelled to Egypt and next fought in Sicily and Italy before being transferred to North-West Europe as part of 21st Army Group in February 1945.

==== Territorial Army battalions ====
The 4th Battalion was transferred to the Royal Engineers and converted, before the war, into the 50th (Northamptonshire Regiment) Anti-Aircraft Battalion, Royal Engineers. On the outbreak of war, it was serving with the 32nd (Midland) Anti-Aircraft Brigade, 2nd Anti-Aircraft Division. In August 1940, the battalion was transferred to the Royal Artillery and became 50th (Northamptonshire Regiment) Searchlight Regiment, Royal Artillery. Due to a severe shortage of manpower in the 21st Army Group fighting in North-west Europe, particularly in the infantry, the regiment was converted back into infantry, becoming 637th (Northamptonshire Regiment) Infantry Regiment, Royal Artillery and joined the 304th Infantry Brigade.

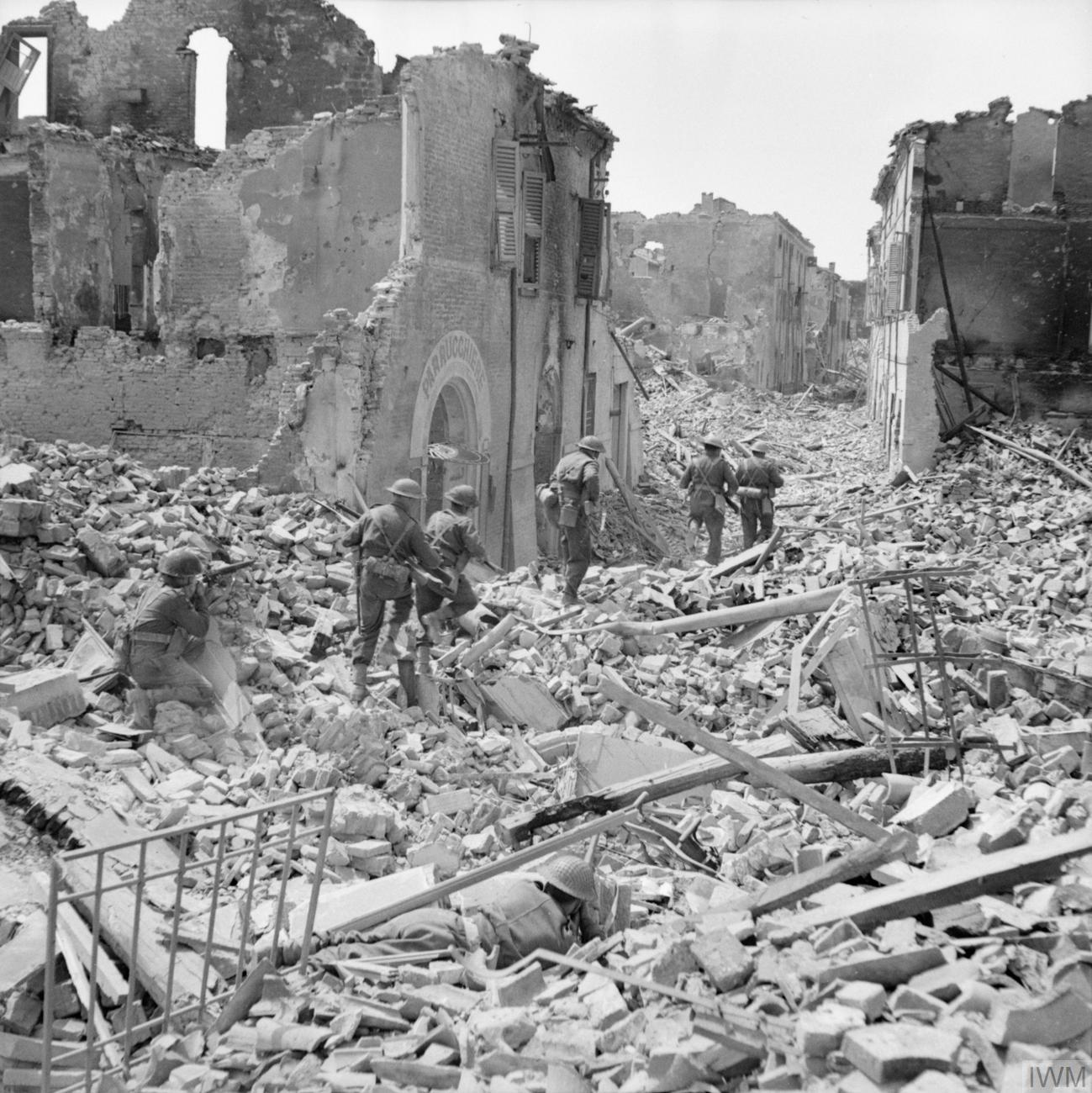
Troops of the 5th (Huntingdonshire) Battalion, 11th Infantry Brigade, 78th Infantry Division pick their way through the ruins of Argenta, 18 April 1945.

The 5th (Huntingdonshire) Battalion was assigned to the 143rd Infantry Brigade, part of the 48th (South Midland) Infantry Division. The 48th Division was sent to join the British Expeditionary Force in France in early 1940, the first Territorial division to be sent overseas in the Second World War, and the battalion was exchanged for the 1st Battalion, Oxford and Bucks Light Infantry and transferred to the 11th Infantry Brigade, 4th Infantry Division. It saw extensive service in France, Tunisia, Sicily and Italy before ending the war in Austria.

The 4th Battalion was reformed as a 2nd Line Territorial Army formation serving in the 183rd Infantry Brigade, as part of the 61st Infantry Division. It was raised in 1939, when the Territorial Army was doubled in size, as the duplicate of the 5th Battalion. Despite being raised for war service, it remained in the United Kingdom until February 1945 when, now as part of the 115th Infantry Brigade, it went to North West Europe.

==== Hostilities-only ====
The 50th (Holding) Battalion was raised on 12 June 1940. The role of the Holding battalion was to temporarily 'hold' men who were medically unfit, temporarily homeless, returning from abroad or awaiting orders. It was redesignated the 6th Battalion in October 1940 and was assigned to the 223rd Independent Infantry Brigade (Home). However, the battalion would remain in the United Kingdom throughout the war, later transferring to 204th Independent Infantry Brigade (Home) and becoming a reserve training battalion for the rest of the war.

=== Amalgamation ===
In 1948, the regiment was reduced to a single regular battalion. Following the recommendations of the 1957 Defence White Paper, the 1st Battalions of the Royal Lincolnshire and Northamptonshire Regiments were merged on 1 June 1960 to form the 2nd East Anglian Regiment (Duchess of Gloucester's Own Royal Lincolnshire and Northamptonshire). This regiment was short-lived, becoming part of the Royal Anglian Regiment on 1 September 1964.

== Regimental museum ==
The Museum of the Northamptonshire Regiment is housed at Abington Park, Northampton.

== Battalions ==
The following is a list of the battalions which the regiment raised (f. Formed, c. Cadre, d. Disbanded, t. Transferred);

Battalions
Regulars	Militia	Territorials (till 1947)	Others (War Raised)
1st Btn (f.1881, c.1947, d. 1948): (2)1st Btn (f.1948, d. 1960)	(1) 3rd (Northamptonshire & Rutland Militia) Btn (f.1860, t.1908 to Special Reserve): (2) 3rd (Reserve) Btn (f.1908 from Militia, d.1953)	4th Btn (f.1881, S/A 1919, f.1920, t.1947 to Royal Engineers): 2/4th Btn (f.1914, d.1918); 4th (Reserve) Btn (f.1915, d.1919)	5th (Service) Btn (f.1914, d.1919)
2nd Btn (f.1881, d. 1948)	4th Militia Btn (f.1874, d.1899)	5th (Huntingdonshire) Btn (f.1920, d.1961): 2/5th (Huntingdonshire) Btn (f.1914, d.1919); 3/5th (Huntingdonshire) Btn (f.1915, d.1919); 4th Btn (f.1939, S/A 1946, d.1947)	6th (Service) Btn (f.1914, c.1918, d.1919)
		9th Btn (f.1917, d.1919)	7th (Service) Btn (f.1914, c.1918, d.1919)
			8th (Reserve) Btn (f.1914, t.1916 to Training Reserve)
			1st Garrison Btn (f.1915, d.1919)
			2nd (Home Service) Garrison Btn (f.1916, t.1917 to Royal Defence Corps)
			6th Btn/50th (Holding) Btn (f.1940 as 50th (Holding) Btn, d.1946)

== Badges and dress distinctions ==

The badges of the regiment included references to the units combined in 1881. The cap badge featured a representation of a castle and key and the battle honour "Gibraltar", earned by the 58th Foot in 1779–1783. Below the castle was a scroll bearing the honour "Talavera", and the badge was encircled by a laurel wreath earned by the 48th Foot in 1809 during the Peninsular War.

The collar badge (which was also used as the design for the regimental "crest"), was based on that of the Northamptonshire and Rutland Militia. This featured the cross of St George within a crowned circle. Around the circle was a laurel wreath, on the base of which was a horseshoe, representing Rutland.

The regimental buttons of other ranks bore the castle and key surmounted by a crown, while those worn on officers' mess dress displayed a scroll inscribed "Talavera" below a crown.

The facing colours of the 48th and 58th Foot were buff and black respectively. Although white facings were imposed in 1881 by the Childers reforms, the old colours were still used in the regiment. The regimental stable belt consisted of equal stripes of black, buff and sky blue. In 1927 the regiment's facings were changed to buff. The scarlet and blue officers' mess dress worn in the 1930s included collar and cuffs in the buff of the 48th and waistcoats in the black of the 58th. A black lanyard was worn on the battle-dress blouse introduced in 1937, and this was later adopted by the 2nd Battalion, Royal Anglian Regiment.

== Battle honours ==
The regiment was awarded the following battle honours:

- Awarded for the actions of the 48th and 58th Regiments of Foot:
  - Louisburg, Quebec 1759, Martinique 1762, Havannah, Gibraltar 1779-'83 (Awarded as a badge consisting of a castle and key with the motto Montis Insignia Calpe.), Martinique 1794 (awarded 1909), Maida, Egypt (Awarded as a badge of the sphinx superscribed "Egypt".) Douro, Talavera, Albuera, Badajoz, Salamanca, Vittoria, Pyrenees, Nivelle, Orthes, Toulouse, Peninsula, New Zealand, Sevastopol, South Africa 1879
- Awarded for the actions of the Northamptonshire Regiment prior to 1914:
  - Tirah, Modder River, South Africa 1899-1902
- Awarded for the actions of the Militia Battalion; rescinded 1910 when Special Reserve units adopted their parent regiments' honours:
  - Mediterranean, South Africa 1902
- Awarded for the actions in the First World War. Ten selected honours, shown in **bold type**, were displayed on the colours:
  - **Mons**, Retreat from Mons, **Marne 1914**, **Aisne 1914, '18**, **Ypres 1914, '17**, Langemarck 1914, '17, Gheluvelt, Nonne Boschen, Givenchy 1914, **Neuve Chapelle**, Aubers, **Loos**, **Somme 1916, '18**, Albert 1916, '18, Bazentin, Delville Wood, Pozieres, Flers-Coucelette, Morval, Thiepval, Le Transloy, Ancre Heights, Ancre 1916, '18, Bapaume 1917, '18, **Arras 1917, '18**, Vimy 1917, Scarpe 1917, '18, Arleux, Messines 1917, Pilckem, Passchendaele, Cambrai 1917, '18, St Quentin, Rosieres, Avre, Villers Bretonneux, Amiens, Drocourt-Queant, Hindenburg Line, **Epehy**, St Quentin Canal, Selle, Sambre, France and Flanders 1914-'18, Suvla, Landing at Suvla, Scimitar Hill, Gallipoli 1915, Egypt 1915-'17, **Gaza**, El Mughar, Nebi Samwil, Jerusalem, Jaffa, Tell' Asur, Megiddo, Sharon, Palestine 1917-'18
- Awarded for the actions in the Second World War. Ten selected honours, shown in **bold type**, were displayed on the colours:
  - Defence of Escaut Defence of Arras Ypres-Comines Canal, **North-West Europe 1940, '45**, Djediada, Djebel Djaffa, Oued Zarga, Djebel Tanngoucha, Sidi Ahmed, **North Africa 1942-'43**, Landing in Sicily, Adrano, Sicily 1943, Sangro, **Garigliano Crossing**, **Anzio**, **Cassino II**, Monte Gabbione, Trasimene Line, Monte La Pieve, Argenta Gap, **Italy 1943-'45**, Madagascar, **Yu**, **Imphal**, Tamu Road, Bishenpur, Monywa 1945, **Myinmu Bridgehead**, Irrawaddy, **Burma 1943-'45**

== Victoria Crosses ==
- Sergeant William Ewart Boulter - First World War, 14 July 1916
- Acting Captain Thomas Riversdale Colyer-Fergusson - First World War, 31 July 1917
- Lieutenant Alan Richard Hill - First Boer War, 28 January 1881
- Lance Corporal Leonard Allan Lewis - First World War, 18–21 September 1918
- Private James Osborne - First Boer War, 22 February 1881
- Captain Anketell Moutray Read - First World War, 25 September 1915

== Colonel-in-Chief ==
- 1937–: Princess Alice, Duchess of Gloucester, GCB CI, GCVO, GBE

== Regimental Colonels ==
Colonels of the regiment were:

- 1881–1897: (1st Battalion): Gen. William Anson McCleverty (ex 48th Foot)
- 1881–1892: (2nd Battalion): Gen. Sir Arthur Johnstone Lawrence, KCB (ex 58th Foot)
- 1897–1910: Maj-Gen. Robert Children Whitehead, CB
- 1910–1925: Maj-Gen. George Fitzherbert Browne, CB, DSO
- 1925–1931: Gen. Sir Havelock Hudson, GCB, KCIE
- 1931–1943: Gen. Sir Harry Hugh Sidney Knox, KCB, DSO
- 1943–1953: Maj-Gen. Guy St. George Robinson, CB, DSO, MC
- 1953–1956: Brig. Wilfrid John Jervois, MC
- 1956–1960: Brig. John Lingham, CB, DSO, MC
- 1960: Regiment amalgamated with the Royal Lincolnshire Regiment to form 2nd East Anglian Regiment (Duchess of Gloucester's Own Royal Lincolnshire and Northamptonshire).

== Sources ==
- Beckett, Ian (2008). Discovering English County Regiments. Osprey. ISBN 978-0-74-780506-9.
- Bellis, Malcolm A. (1994). Regiments of the British Army 1939–1945 (Armour & Infantry). London: Military Press International. ISBN 0-85420-999-9.
- Chant, Christopher (1988). Handbook of British Regiments. Routledge. ISBN 978-0-41-500241-7.
- J.B.M. Frederick, Lineage Book of British Land Forces 1660–1978, Vol I, Wakefield: Microform Academic, 1984, ISBN 1-85117-007-3.
- J.B.M. Frederick, Lineage Book of British Land Forces 1660–1978, Vol II, Wakefield: Microform Academic, 1984, ISBN 1-85117-009-X.
- Joslen, Lt-Col H.F. (2003) [1st. Pub. HMSO:1960]. Orders of Battle, Second World War, 1939–1945. Uckfield: Naval & Military Press. ISBN 978-1-84-342474-1.
- Maj C.A. Markham, The History of the Northamptonshire and Rutland Militia, Now the 3rd Battalion (Militia) of The Northamptonshire Regiment, from 1756 to 1919, London: Reeves & Turner, 1924.
- Rodger, Alexander (2003). Battle Honours of the British Empire and Commonwealth Land Forces 1662–1991. Marlborough, Wiltshire: The Crowood Press. ISBN 1-86126-637-5.
- Swinson, Arthur (1972). A Register of the Regiments and Corps of the British Army. London: The Archive Press. ISBN 0-85591-000-3.
