= Gibraltar Barracks =

There are several Gibraltar Barracks in the world.

- Gibraltar Barracks, Bury St Edmunds
- Gibraltar Barracks, Northampton
- Gibraltar Barracks, Minley

== See also ==
- Gibraltar Camp, a refugee camp in Jamaica during World War II
