= Quebec Barracks =

Quebec Barracks may refer to:

- Aldershot Garrison, in South East England
- Osnabrück Garrison, Osnabrück, Germany
- Simpson Barracks, Northamptonshire, England
