= William Boulter =

British Army officer

William Ewart Boulter
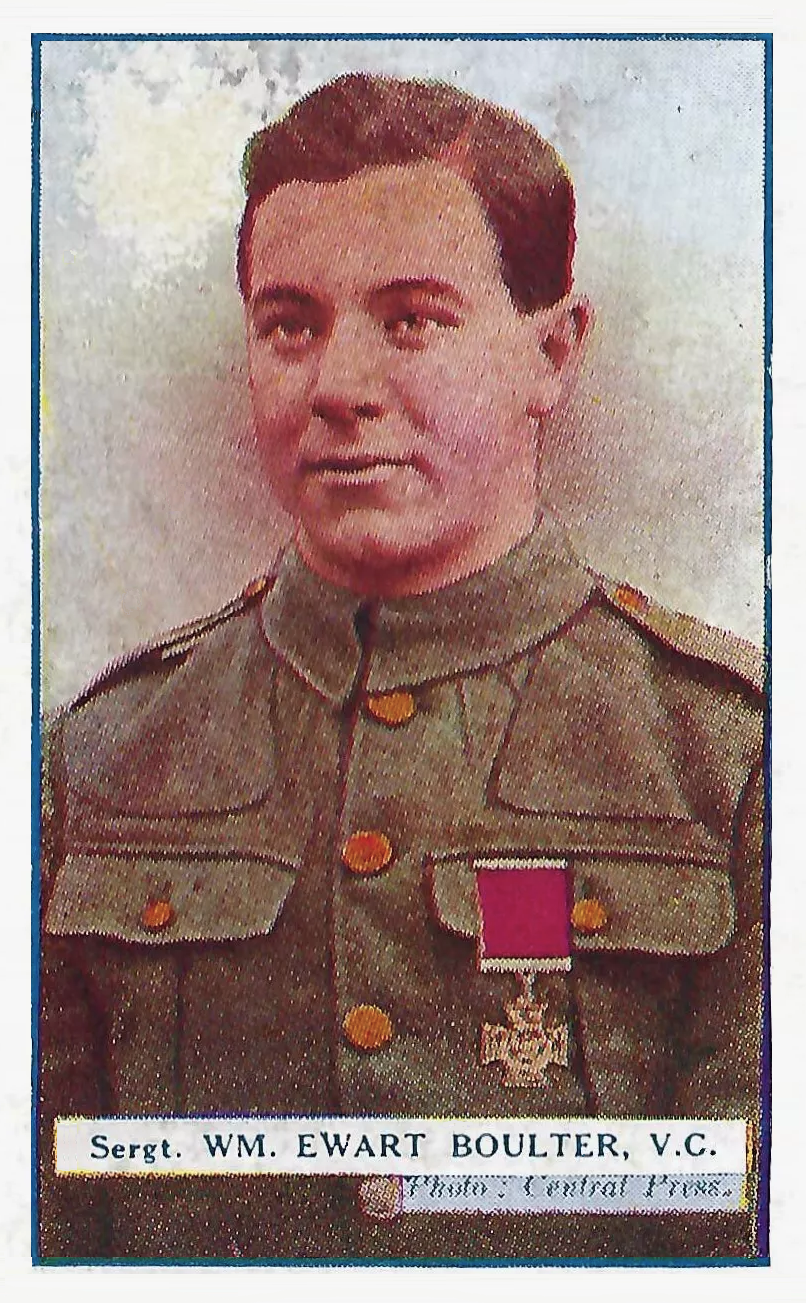
- Boulter depicted on a 1917 cigarette card
- Born: 14 October 1892; Wigston, Leicestershire, England
- Died: 1 June 1955 (aged 62); Wimbledon, London
- Military career
- Allegiance: United Kingdom
- Branch: British Army; Royal Air Force
- Rank: Lieutenant
- Service number: 14603
- Units: Northamptonshire Regiment
- Conflicts: World War I
- Awards: Victoria Cross

Lieutenant William Ewart Boulter VC (14 October 1892 – 1 June 1955) was a British Army officer and an English recipient of the Victoria Cross (VC), the highest and most prestigious award for gallantry in the face of the enemy that can be awarded to British and Commonwealth forces.

He was born and grew up in Wigston Leicestershire, and on leaving school worked in a Co-operative shop. After the outbreak of the First World War he joined the Northamptonshire Regiment, British Army, and travelled to France in late 1915.

Boulter was a 23 years old sergeant in the 6th Battalion, the Northamptonshire Regiment, during the First World War when the following deed took place during the Battle of the Somme for which he was awarded the VC.

On 14 July 1916 at Trônes Wood, France, when one company and part of another was held up in the attack on a wood by a hostile machine-gun which was causing heavy casualties, Sergeant Boulter, with utter contempt of danger, and in spite of being wounded in the shoulder, advanced alone over open ground under heavy fire, in front of the gun and bombed the gun team from their position. This act not only saved many casualties, but materially helped the operation of clearing the enemy out of the wood.

Seriously wounded during the attack, he was hospitalised and returned to England. In August 1917 he returned to France as a Second Lieutenant and was promoted lieutenant in December 1918. He was demobilised in August 1919.

During the Second World War Boulter joined the Royal Air Force. He was commissioned as a Pilot Officer in the training branch in April 1941 and, after leading an Air Training Corps Squadron in Wimbledon, he retired due to ill health in July 1944.

He died on 1 June 1955 in Wimbledon, Surrey and was cremated at Putney Vale Crematorium.

His Victoria Cross is displayed at the Abington Park, Northampton, England.

== Bibliography ==
- Gliddon, Gerald (2011) [1991]. Somme 1916. VCs of the First World War. The History Press. ISBN 978-0-7524-6303-2.
