= Listed buildings in Maunby =

Maunby is a civil parish in the county of North Yorkshire, England. It contains two listed buildings that are recorded in the National Heritage List for England. Both the listed buildings are designated at Grade II, the lowest of the three grades, which is applied to "buildings of national importance and special interest". The parish contains the village of Maunby and the surrounding countryside, and the listed buildings consist of a farmhouse and a pair of gate piers.

== Buildings ==
Name and location	Photograph	Date	Notes
Red House Farmhouse; 54.28285°N 1.45757°W	—	Early 18th century	The farmhouse is in brick, with a floor band, and a tile roof with brick coping and kneelers. There are two storeys and attics, four bays and flanking lean-tos. On the front is a doorway, and the windows are sashes with flat arches in gauged brick.
Gate piers northeast of Maunby Hall; 54.27168°N 1.45512°W	—	18th century	The pair of gate piers is in rusticated stone. Each pier has a cornice and a shaped pyramidal cap.
