= Simpson Barracks, Northamptonshire =

Former military installation at Wootton in Northamptonshire, England

Simpson Barracks
- Wootton, Northamptonshire, England
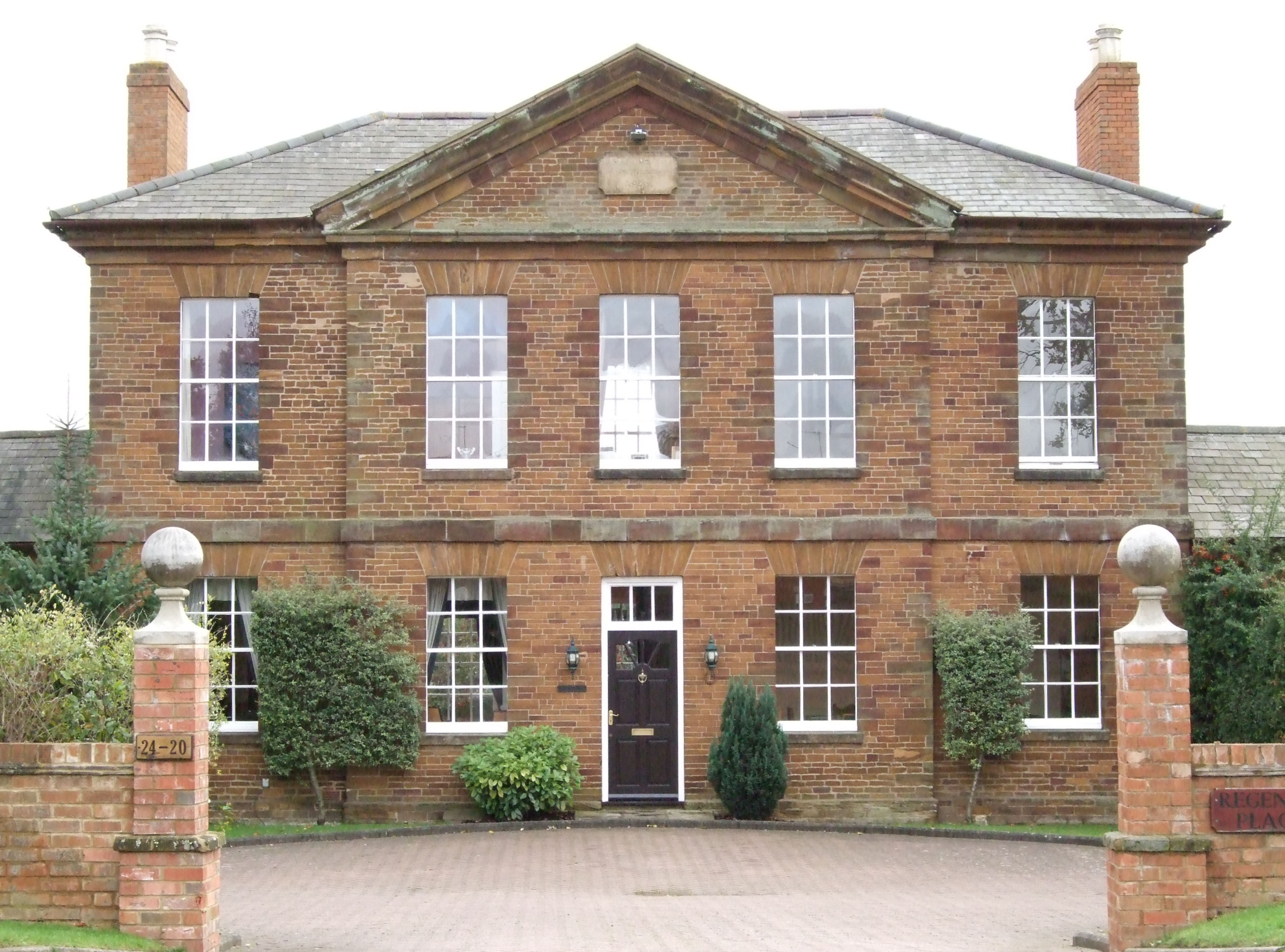
- Simpson Barracks

Site information
- Type: Barracks
- Owner: Ministry of Defence
- Operator: British Army

Location
- Location within Northamptonshire
- Coordinates: 52.20782°N 0.88346°W

Site history
- Built: 1939
- Built for: War Office
- In use: 1939–1993

Garrison information
- Occupants: Northamptonshire Regiment

Simpson Barracks (formerly Quebec Barracks) is a former military installation at Wootton in Northamptonshire, England.

== History ==
The barracks were established in 1939, at the start of the Second World War, under the name of Quebec Barracks as the depot for the Northamptonshire Regiment whose previous depot at Gibraltar Barracks was becoming inadequate. The Northamptonshire Regiment remained at the barracks until it merged with the Royal Lincolnshire Regiment to form the 2nd East Anglian Regiment (Duchess of Gloucester's Own Royal Lincolnshire and Northamptonshire) in 1960. The Royal Pioneer Corps moved to the barracks in 1960, at which time the barracks were renamed Simpson Barracks after General Sir Frank Simpson who served as colonel commandant of the Royal Pioneer Corps. The Corps remained there until they were amalgamated with other units to form the Royal Logistic Corps and the barracks closed in 1993. The site was redeveloped for housing in the late 1990s.
