= Maunby =

Village and civil parish in North Yorkshire, England

Coordinates: 54.266667°N 1.45°W

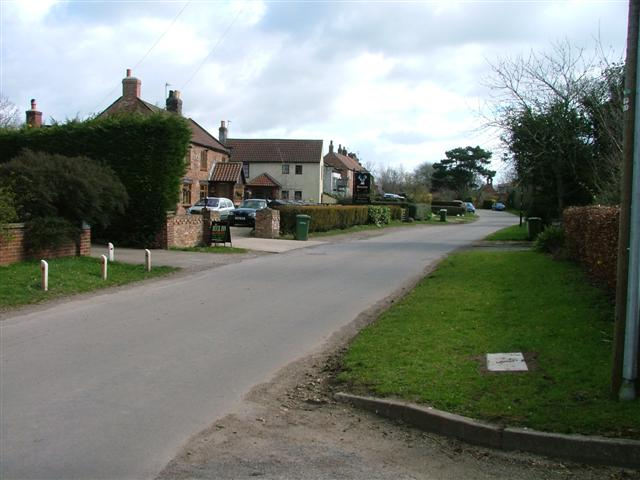
- Maunby in 2006

- Location within North Yorkshire
- Population: 142 (2011 census)
- OS grid reference: SE352864
- Unitary authority: North Yorkshire
- Ceremonial county: North Yorkshire
- Region: Yorkshire and the Humber
- Country: England
- Sovereign state: United Kingdom
- Post town: Thirsk
- Postcode district: YO7
- Police: North Yorkshire
- Fire: North Yorkshire
- Ambulance: Yorkshire

Maunby is a village and civil parish in the county of North Yorkshire, England, about six miles south of Northallerton and on the River Swale. The population is estimated at around 150.

From 1974 to 2023 it was part of the Hambleton District, it is now administered by the unitary North Yorkshire Council.

The parish church is St Michael & All Angels which as of 2025 is not in use. In the churchyard is the grave of Victoria Cross-holder Alan Richard Hill-Walker who lived at Maunby Hall. The hall is still owned by the Hill-Walker family.

There was a Methodist church close to the village green which closed in 2021. Village features include the village green, two churches, and the war memorial on the green.

== See also ==
- Listed buildings in Maunby
