= Alan Richard Hill =

Recipient of the Victoria Cross (1859–1944)

Alan Richard Hill-Walker VC
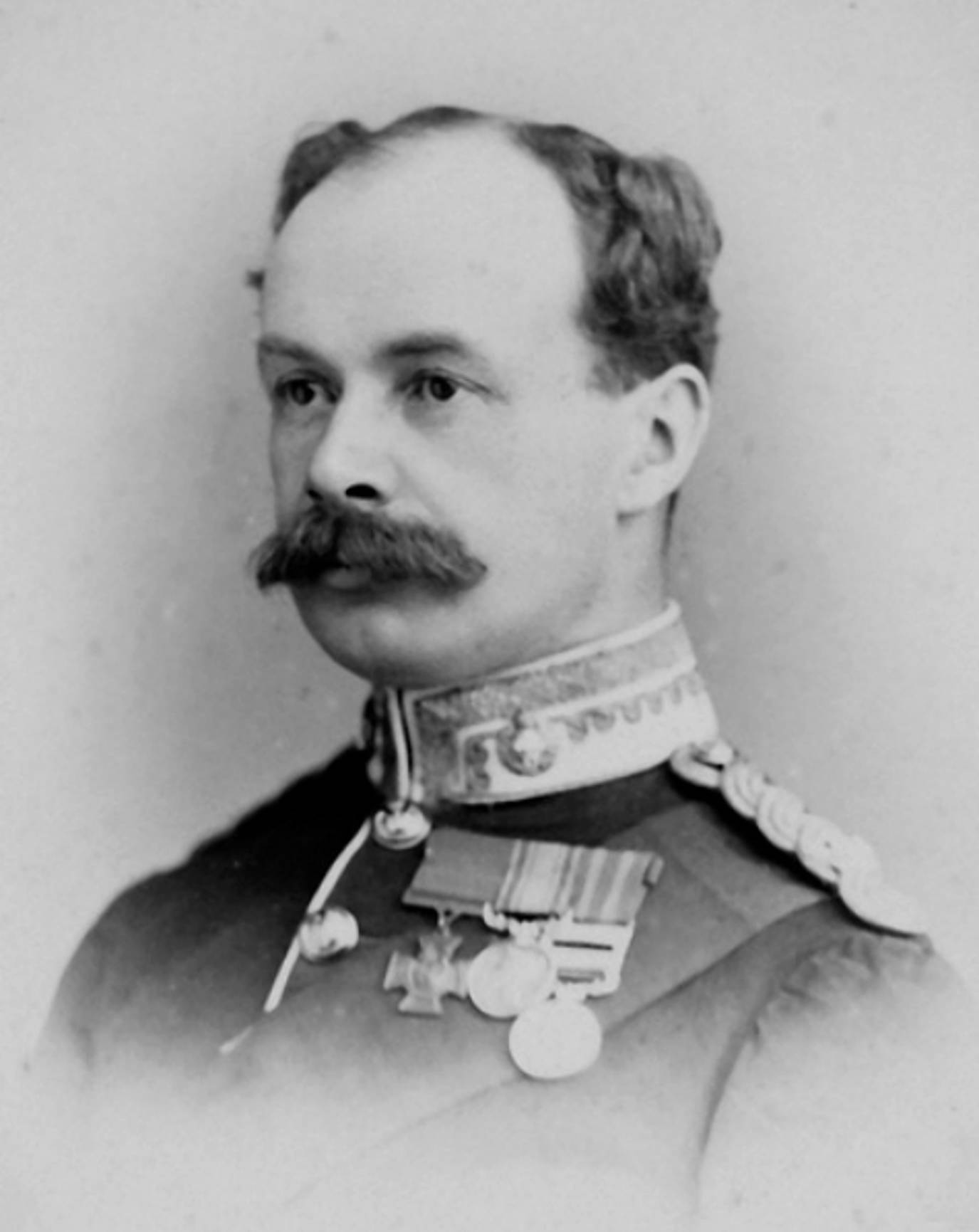
- Hill circa 1881
- Born: 12 July 1859; Northallerton, North Yorkshire
- Died: 21 April 1944 (aged 84); Thirsk, North Yorkshire
- Burial place: St Michael and All Angels Churchyard, Maunby, North Yorkshire
- Military career
- Allegiance: United Kingdom
- Branch: British Army
- Service years: 1876 - 1901
- Rank: Major
- Units: North Yorkshire Militia; 58th Regiment of Foot; The Northamptonshire Regiment
- Conflicts: Anglo-Zulu War; First Boer War; Tirah Campaign
- Awards: Victoria Cross

Alan Richard Hill later Hill-Walker, VC (born in Northallerton 12 July 1859 – 21 April 1944) was an English recipient of the Victoria Cross, the highest and most prestigious award for gallantry in the face of the enemy that can be awarded to British and Commonwealth forces. He won the VC for his actions on 28 January 1881 at the Battle of Laing's Nek during the First Boer War.

After his marriage in 1902, he adopted the surname Hill-Walker.

== Early life ==
Alan Richard Hill was the son of Captain Thomas Hill, chief constable of the North Riding of Yorkshire Constabulary and Frances Mirriam, daughter of Thomas Walker. He was educated at Richmond Grammar School.

Hill was commissioned in July 1876 as a sub-lieutenant in the North York Rifle Militia. He transferred to the 58th (Rutlandshire) Regiment of Foot in February 1879. The regiment was deployed to South Africa in 1879 for service in the Anglo-Zulu War and he saw action at the Battle of Ulundi in July 1879.

== Details ==
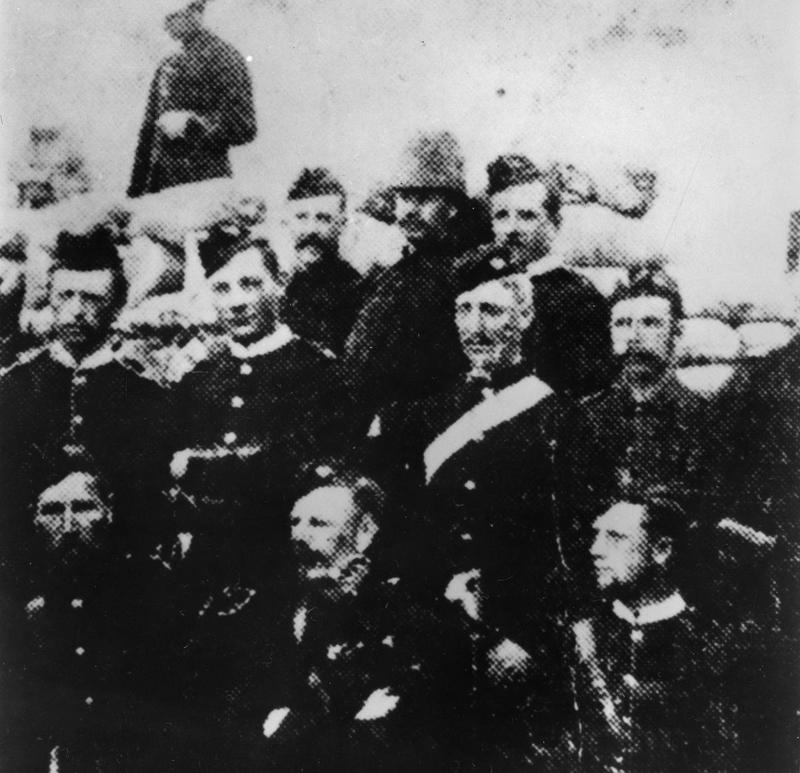
Picture taken about 1884 at the site of the Battle of Rorke's Drift allegedly showing VC recipients including Gonville Bromhead and James Henry Reynolds. Man in rear wearing a Foreign Service helmet has been identified as Alan Richard Hill VC

Hill was 21 years old, and a lieutenant in the 58th (Rutlandshire) Regiment of Foot (which had become the 2nd Battalion, The Northamptonshire Regiment under the Childers Reforms by the time the award was gazetted), British Army during the First Boer War when the following deed took place on 28 January 1881 at the Battle of Laing's Nek, South Africa, for which he was awarded the VC.

The citation reads; "For gallant conduct at the action of Laing's Nek on the 28th January, 1881, in having, after the retreat was ordered, remained behind and endeavoured to carry out of action Lieutenant Baillie, of the same Corps, who was lying on the ground severely wounded. Being unable to lift that officer into the saddle, he carried him in his arms until Lieutenant Baillie was shot dead. Lieutenant Hill then brought a wounded man out of action on his horse, after which he returned and rescued another. All these acts being performed under a heavy fire."

Laing's Nek was the last occasion that a British regiment carried its colours into action. The 58th were led up the hillside by Lieutenant Lancelot Baillie carrying the Regimental Colour and Hill carrying the Queen's Colour. Baillie was mortally wounded. Hill passed the two colours to Sergeant Budstock for safe keeping.

== Further information ==
He was adjutant of the 3rd and 4th (Northampton and Rutland Militia) battalions of the regiment from October 1887 and achieved the rank of major in September 1896 before he retired from the army in October 1901.

In April 1902 he married, in London, Muriel Lilias Oliphant Walker (1876–1953), daughter of T. S. Walker, of Maunby Hall, Thirsk, Yorkshire. He changed his name to Hill-Walker. There were two sons:

- Lieutenant-Colonel Gerald Alan Hill-Walker (1903–1980).
- Lieutenant-Commander Thomas Harry Hill-Walker (1904–1940), was killed in action in 1940.

Hill's medals were bought in 2015 by the Ashcroft Trust and are displayed in the Imperial War Museum.

== See also ==
- John Doogan also won the VC at Laing's Nek.

== Bibliography ==
- Monuments to Courage (David Harvey, 1999)
- The Register of the Victoria Cross (This England, 1997)
- Victoria Crosses of the Anglo-Boer War (Ian Uys, 2000)
- Whitworth, Alan (2012). Yorkshire VCs. Pen and Sword Books. ISBN 978-1-84884-778-1.
