= 2nd East Anglian Regiment =

- Active: 1 June 1960 – 1 September 1964
- Country: United Kingdom
- Branch: British Army
- Type: Infantry
- Role: Line infantry
- Size: Battalion
- Regimental HQ: The Barracks, Northampton
- Nickname: The Poachers
- Facings: Blue

Commanders
- Colonel-in-Chief: Princess Alice, Duchess of Gloucester
- Colonel: Brigadier Ralph Henry Lefroy Oulton, CBE

The 2nd East Anglian Regiment (Duchess of Gloucester's Own Royal Lincolnshire and Northamptonshire) was a short-lived infantry regiment of the British Army from 1960 to 1964. Its lineage is continued by the Royal Anglian Regiment.

== History ==
As a result of the Defence Review, it was announced that the 1st Battalion, Royal Lincolnshire Regiment and the 1st Battalion, Northamptonshire Regiment were to merge with the title 2nd East Anglian Regiment (Royal Lincolnshire and Northamptonshire). On 20 August 1959, it was announced that approval had been given to include the name of Duchess of Gloucester in the regiment's title.

The regiment was formed on 1 June 1960, at Watchet, Somerset. A formation parade was held on 10 July. The regiment moved to Osnabrück, Germany, in 1961, where new colours were presented by the colonel-in-chief in the following year.

On 1 September 1964, the 1st East Anglian Regiment (Royal Norfolk and Suffolk Regiment), 2nd and 3rd East Anglian Regiment (16th/44th Foot) and the Royal Leicestershire Regiment were amalgamated to form a new "large regiment" known as the Royal Anglian Regiment. The 2nd East Anglians were redesignated as the 2nd Battalion, Royal Anglian Regiment (Duchess of Gloucester's Own Royal Lincolnshire and Northamptonshire) of the new regiment.

== Badges and dress distinctions ==
All battalions of the East Anglian Brigade wore a common cap badge, with each unit having a distinctive collar badge, coloured lanyard and stable belt. The 2nd East Anglian Regiment wore a collar badge combining elements of the insignia of the two merged regiments: a sphinx and the battle honour Talavera for the Royal Lincolns and Northamptons respectively. A black lanyard, inherited from the Northamptonshire Regiment, was worn. The regiment's stable belt combined the colours of those of the two predecessors, dark blue with a buff and dark red stripe. The regiment's No.1 Dress uniform was dark blue with scarlet piping and the regimental facing colour was blue.

== Battle honours ==
The 2nd East Anglians inherited the battle honours of its two predecessor regiments. The following were chosen to be displayed on the colours:

Regimental Colour

- Blenheim
- Ramillies
- Oudenarde
- Malplaquet
- Louisburg
- Quebec, 1759
- Martinique, 1762
- Havannah
- Martinique, 1794
- Maida
- Douro
- Talavera
- Albuhera
- Badajoz
- Salamanca
- Vittoria
- Pyrenees
- Nivelle
- Orthes
- Toulouse
- Peninsula
- Sobraon
- New Zealand
- Mooltan
- Goojerat
- Punjaub
- Sevastopol
- Lucknow
- South Africa, 1879
- Tirah
- Atbara
- Khartoum
- Modder River
- Paardeburg
- South Africa, 1899-1902

Queen's Colour

- Mons
- Marne, 1914
- Aisne, 1914'18
- Messines, 1914, '17, '18
- Ypres, 1914,'15,'17
- Neuve Chapelle
- Loos
- Somme, 1916,'18
- Arras, 1917'18
- Lys
- Hindenburg Line
- Epéhy
- Suvla
- Gaza
- Dunkirk, 1940
- Normandy Landing
- Fontenay le Pesnil
- Antwerp-Turnhout Canal
- Rhineland
- North Africa 1942-43
- Salerno
- Garigliano Crossing
- Anzio
- Cassino II
- Gothic Line
- Italy 1943-45
- Ngakyedauk Pass
- Imphal
- Myinmu Bridgehead
- Burma, 1943–45

The centre badge for the regimental colours was Below a sprig of three maple leaves each charged with a fleur-de-lys, the Sphinx upon a plinth inscribed "Egypt" . The maple leaves and fleurs-de-lis were the badge of the Northamptonshire Regiment, signifying the regiment's service in Quebec in 1758-9 while the sphinx was a badge of the Royal Lincolnshire Regiment. In the lower two corners of the regimental colour were the cypher of the Duchess of Gloucester and the castle and key of Gibraltar with the dates 'Gibraltar 1779-83' and the motto 'Montis Insignia Calpe'.

Preceded by Royal Lincolnshire Regiment; Northamptonshire Regiment	2nd East Anglian Regiment; 1960–1964	Succeeded by Royal Anglian Regiment
