= 58th (Rutlandshire) Regiment of Foot =

58th Regiment of Foot
- Active: 1755 to 1881
- Country: Kingdom of Great Britain (1755–1800); United Kingdom (1801–1881)
- Branch: British Army
- Type: Line Infantry
- Role: Infantry
- Size: One battalion (two battalions 1804–1815)
- Garrison/HQ: Gibraltar Barracks, Northampton
- Nicknames: The Honeysuckers; The Steelbacks
- Engagements: French and Indian War; Anglo-Spanish War; French Revolutionary Wars; Napoleonic Wars; New Zealand Wars; Anglo-Zulu War; First Boer War

The 58th (Rutlandshire) Regiment of Foot was a British Army line infantry regiment, raised in 1755. Under the Childers Reforms it amalgamated with the 48th (Northamptonshire) Regiment of Foot to form the Northamptonshire Regiment in 1881.

== History ==
=== Early wars ===
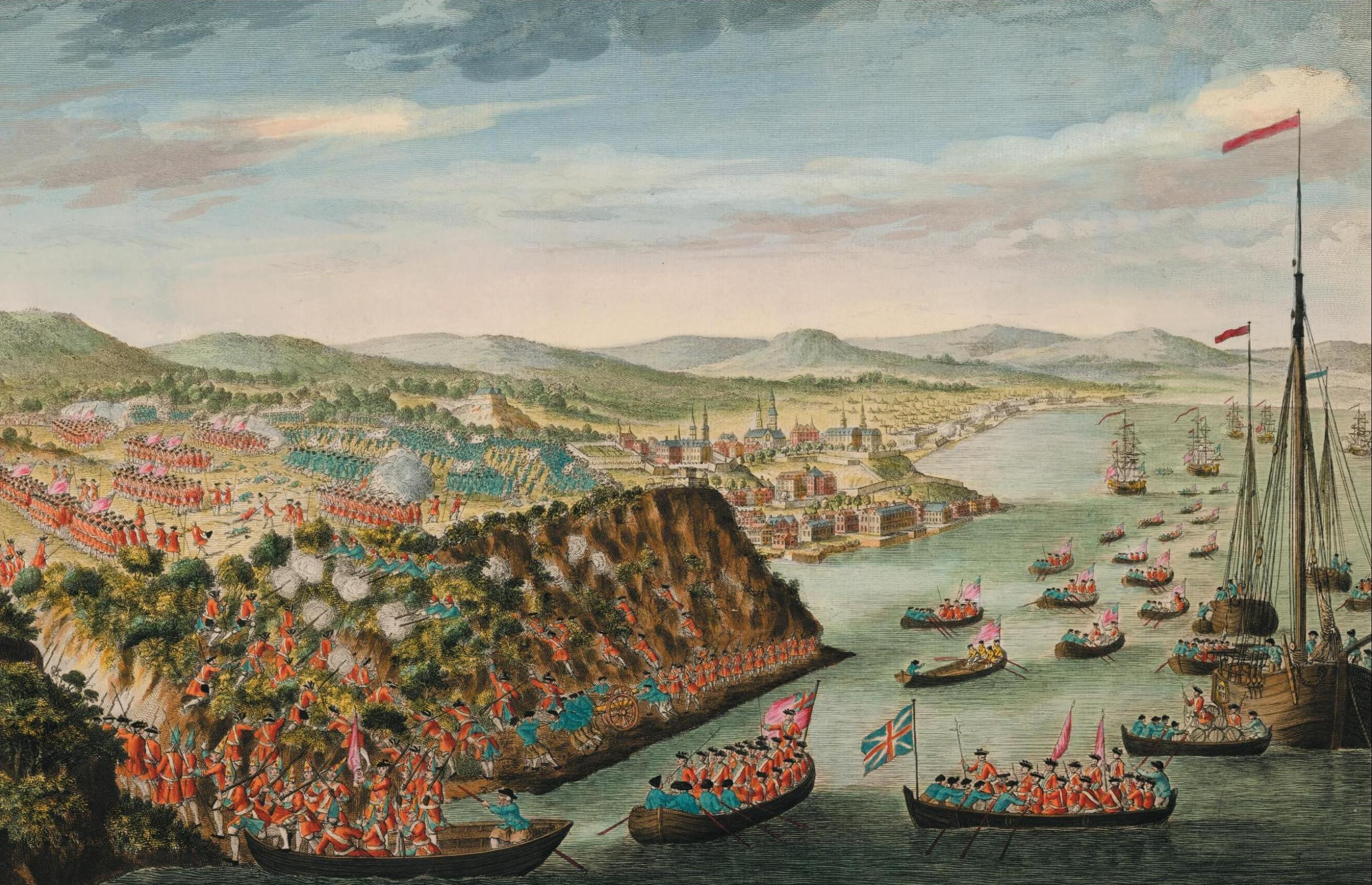
Drawing by a soldier depicting the Battle of the Plains of Abraham in September 1759

The regiment was raised by Colonel Robert Anstruther as the 60th Regiment of Foot in 1755 for service in the Seven Years' War. It was re-ranked as the 58th Regiment of Foot, following the disbandment of the existing 50th and 51st regiments, in 1756. The regiment embarked for North America in spring 1758 for service in the French and Indian War and saw action at the Siege of Louisbourg in June 1758, the Battle of the Plains of Abraham in September 1759, the Battle of Sainte-Foy and the subsequent Siege of Quebec in April to May 1760. It then took part in the final and decisive campaign between July and September 1760 when Montreal fell. The regiment then moved to the West Indies and, although eight companies of the regiment were captured by the French en route, it took part in the Siege of Havana in summer 1762 during the Anglo-Spanish War. After returning to England later that year it was posted to Gibraltar in 1770 and took part in the Great Siege in the early 1780s. It adopted a county designation as the 58th (Rutlandshire) Regiment of Foot in August 1782.

=== Napoleonic Wars ===
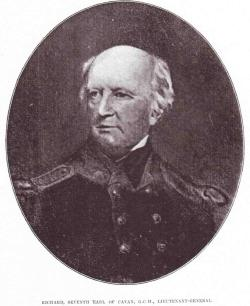
Richard Lambart, 7th Earl of Cavan, Colonel of the regiment during the Napoleonic Wars

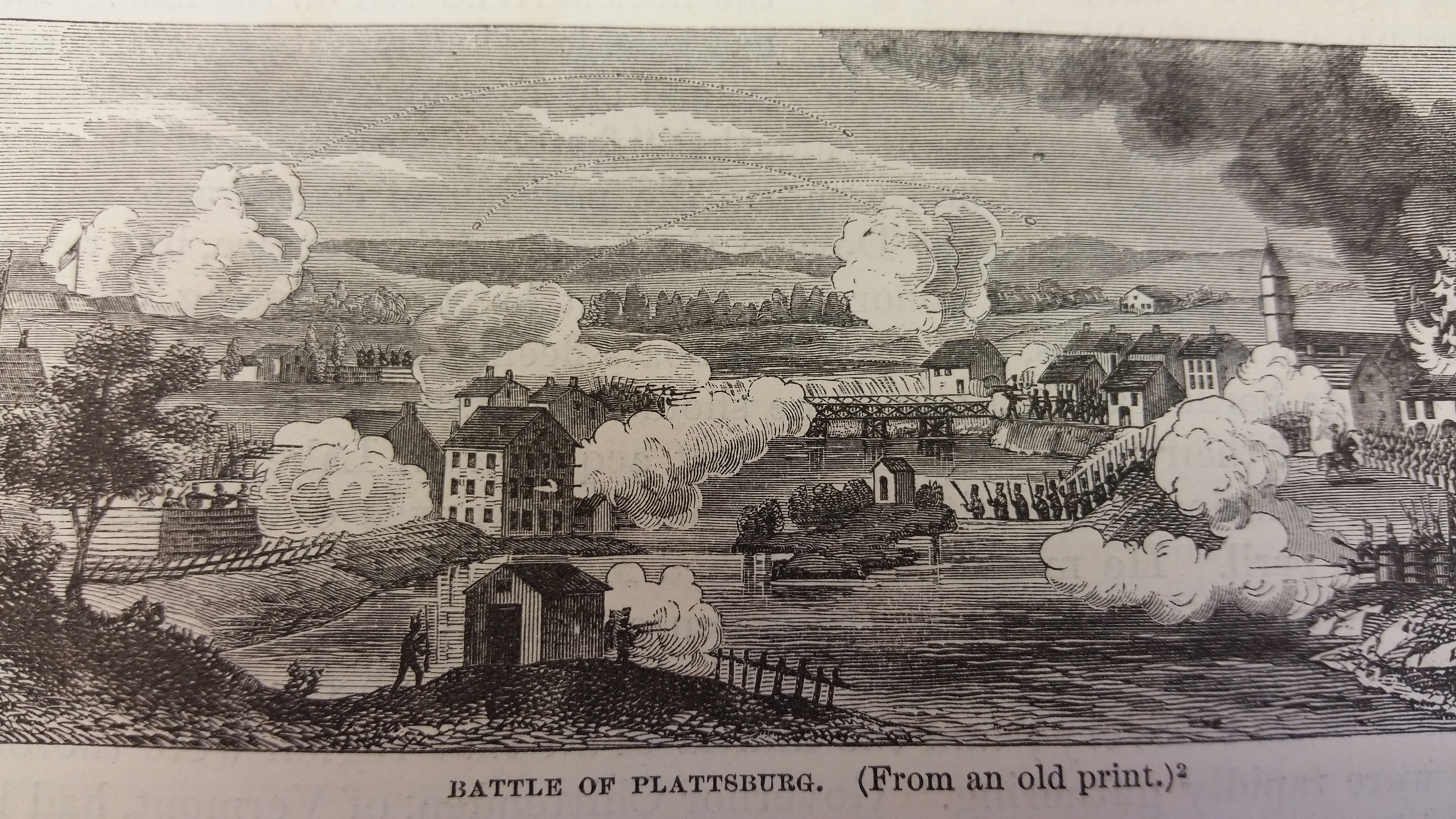
The Battle of Plattsburgh in September 1814

The regiment embarked for the West Indies in late 1793 and fought at the capture of Martinique in February 1794 during the French Revolutionary Wars. After returning to England in 1795, it was deployed, under the command of Colonel William Houston, in the Capture of Minorca in November 1798. The regiment then embarked for Egypt for service in the French campaign in Egypt and Syria: it saw action at the Battle of Abukir in March 1801, the Battle of Alexandria later that month and the Siege of Cairo in June 1801. A second battalion was raised in 1804 to increase the strength of the regiment.

The 1st battalion was deployed to Sicily in 1805 for service in the Napoleonic Wars and saw action at the Battle of Maida in July 1806. It then moved to Calabria in Italy, where it participated in a raid on shipping at Diamante in September 1808. It was deployed to Portugal in spring 1812 to serve under the Marquess of Wellington in the Peninsular campaign. During this campaign it fought on the East Coast of the Peninsula at the Battle of Castalla in April 1813 and the Siege of Tarragona in June 1813. It then embarked for North America for service in the War of 1812 and saw action at the Battle of Plattsburgh in September 1814.

Meanwhile, the 2nd battalion, which was formed in 1803, saw service initially in Ireland and was then posted to Jersey in April 1804 serving there until 1809. They deployed from Jersey to Portugal arriving in Lisbon on 2 July 1809. The regiment initially deployed as garrison troops for Lisbon. The battalion's headquarters were based at Vila Nova on the northern edge of Lisbon; it fielded some nine companies. One company was commanded by Captain Adam Ferguson. During the autumn of 1810 the newly formed "Fighting 3rd Division" led by General Thomas Picton, had the 2nd Battalion of the 58th Foot placed under its command and ordered it to move to a defensive position at the Lines of Torres Vedras. The battalion then advanced with the 3rd Division and in April 1812 saw action at the Battle of Salamanca in July 1812, the siege of Burgos in September 1812 and the Battle of Vitoria in June 1813. It then pursued the French Army into France and saw action at the Battle of the Pyrenees in July 1813, the Battle of Nivelle in November 1813 and the Battle of the Nive in December 1813 as well as the Battle of Orthez in February 1814. The 2nd battalion were ordered to be reduced in establishment or disbanded on 24 December 1815.

=== The Victorian era ===
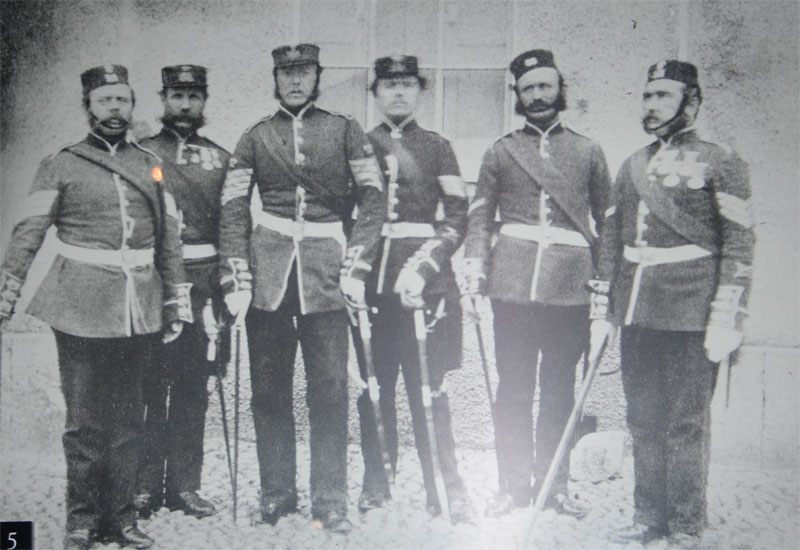
Non-commissioned officers of the 58th Regiment in New Zealand, c.1858

The regiment was deployed to Jamaica in 1816 and to Ceylon in 1828 and to New South Wales, where it took over garrison duties from the 80th Regiment of Foot, in 1843. It was deployed to New Zealand for service in the New Zealand Wars in March 1845. In December 1846, during the Whanganui campaign, 180 soldiers from the regiment and four Royal Artillery men were landed at Whanganui with two 12-pounder guns and began fortifying the town, building the Rutland Stockade on a hill at the town's northern end and the York Stockade towards the south. The establishment of the garrison heightened Te Mamaku's expectations of government intervention, and he vowed he would protect settlers but fight the soldiers. On 16 April 1847, after a minor chief of the Wanganui people was accidentally shot by a junior army officer, about 500 or 600 heavily armed Māori formed a taua (war party) that swept down the Whanganui River, plundering and burning settlers' houses and killing and mutilating a soldier from the 58th Regiment who ventured out of the town.

When a fire broke out in Auckland, New Zealand, in 1858, eventually destroying an entire city block, the men of the 58th Regiment were instrumental in firefighting efforts under the command of Colonel Robert Wynyard.

Although some men from the regiment chose to settle in New Zealand, the regiment returned home in 1859.

The regiment was deployed to India in 1864 and remained there until 1874 when it returned to England. It was sent to South Africa in 1879 for service in the Anglo-Zulu War and saw action at the Battle of Ulundi in July 1879. It also fought at the Battle of Laing's Nek in January 1881 and the Battle of Majuba Hill in February 1881 during the First Boer War. At the Battle of Laing's Nek it was the last regiment to carry its regimental colours into battle and Lieutenant Alan Richard Hill won the Victoria Cross.

As part of the Cardwell Reforms of the 1870s, where single-battalion regiments were linked together to share one depot and recruiting district in the United Kingdom, the 58th was linked with the 48th (Northamptonshire) Regiment of Foot, and assigned to district no. 29 at Gibraltar Barracks in Northampton. On 1 July 1881 the Childers Reforms came into effect and the regiment amalgamated with the 48th (Northamptonshire) Regiment of Foot to form the Northamptonshire Regiment.

== Battle honours ==
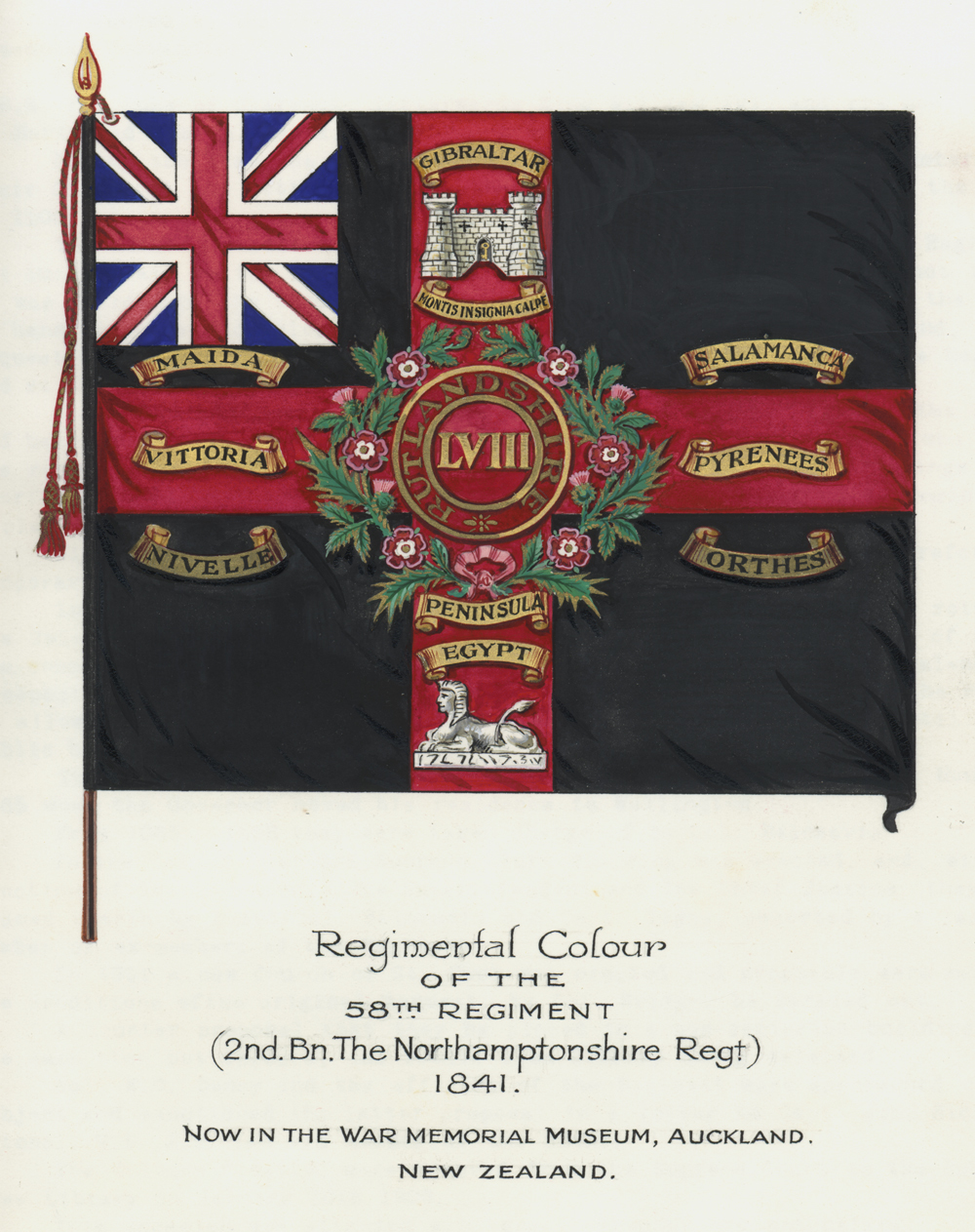
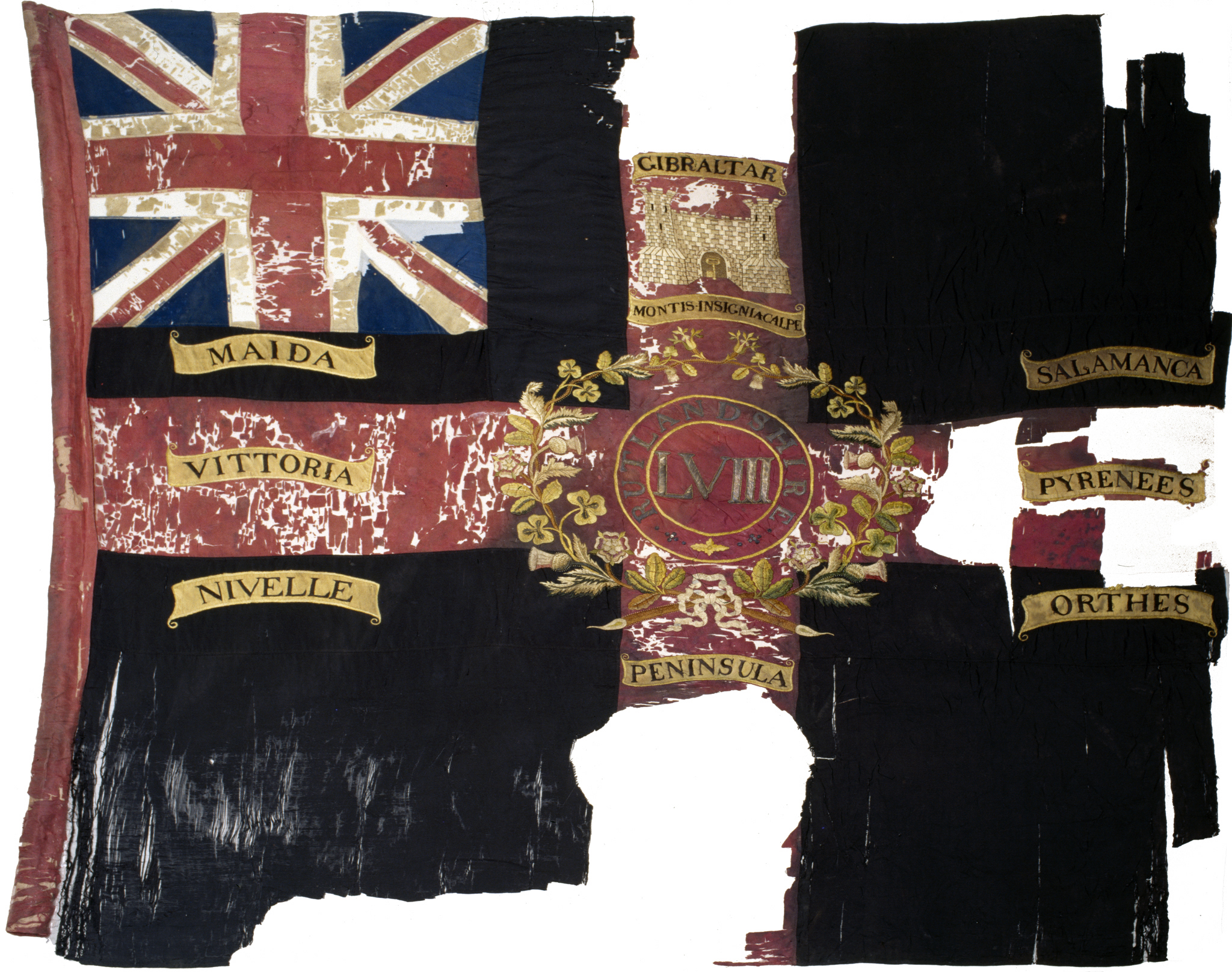
1841 Regimental Colour of the 58th Regiment

Battle honours won by the regiment were:

- Gibraltar 1779–1783
- French Revolutionary Wars: Egypt
- Napoleonic Wars: Maida
- Peninsular War: Salamanca, Vittoria, Pyrenees, Nivelle, Orthes, Peninsula
- New Zealand Land Wars: New Zealand 1846–1847

In 1841, the Regiment was presented its second stand of colours. They were laid up in 1860 and presented to the people of Auckland, New Zealand.

== Colonels of the Regiment ==
Colonels of the Regiment were:

=== 60th Regiment of Foot ===
- 1755–1767: Lt-Gen. Robert Anstruther

=== 58th Regiment of Foot – (1756) ===
- 1767–1775: Gen. The Rt. Hon. Robert Cuninghame, 1st Baron Rossmore, PC
- 1775–1776: Col. Hon. George West
- 1776–1787: Lt-Gen. Lancelot Baugh

=== 58th (Rutlandshire) Regiment of Foot – (1782) ===
- 1787–1811: Gen. George Scott
- 1811–1823: Gen. Richard Lambart, 7th Earl of Cavan, KC
- 1823–1826: Gen. Thomas Graham, 1st Baron Lynedoch, GCB, GCMG
- 1826–1828: Maj-Gen. Lord Frederick Bentinck, CB
- 1828–1833: Lt-Gen. Sir Kenneth Douglas, 1st Baronet
- 1833–1848: Gen. Frederick Maitland
- 1848–1851: Lt-Gen. Sir George Charles D'Aguilar, KCB
- 1851–1864: Gen. Edward Buckley Wynyard, CB
- 1864–1868: Lt-Gen. Charles Craufurd Hay
- 1868–1870: Maj-Gen. William Sullivan, CB
- 1870–1881: Gen. Sir Arthur Johnstone Lawrence, KCB

== Sources ==
- Beatson, Robert (1806). A political index to the histories of Great Britain & Ireland. Lonman, Hurst, Rees & Orme. p. 246. "Robert Anstruther 58th 26th Regiment of Foot."
- Belich, James (1986). The New Zealand Wars. Auckland: Penguin. ISBN 0-14-027504-5.
- Stanley, Peter (1986). The Remote Garrison: The British Army in Australia. Kenthurst, New South Wales: Kangaroo Press. ISBN 0-86417-091-2.
