= 48th (Northamptonshire) Regiment of Foot =

- Active: 1741 to 1881
- Country: Kingdom of Great Britain (1741–1800); United Kingdom (1801–1881)
- Branch: British Army
- Type: Line Infantry
- Size: One battalion (two battalions 1803–1814)
- Garrison/HQ: Gibraltar Barracks, Northampton
- Nicknames: "The Heroes of Talavera", "Murray's Bucks", "The Surprisers", "Lacedemonians".
- Colours: Buff Facings, Gold Braided Lace
- March: Quick: Rule Britannia/Speed The Plough; Slow: The Northamptonshire
- Engagements: Jacobite rising War of the Austrian Succession; French and Indian War; Napoleonic Wars; Coorg War; Crimean War

The 48th (Northamptonshire) Regiment of Foot was a regiment of the British Army, raised in 1741. Under the Childers Reforms it amalgamated with the 58th (Rutlandshire) Regiment of Foot to form the Northamptonshire Regiment in 1881.

== History ==
=== Early history ===
A regimental private in c. 1742

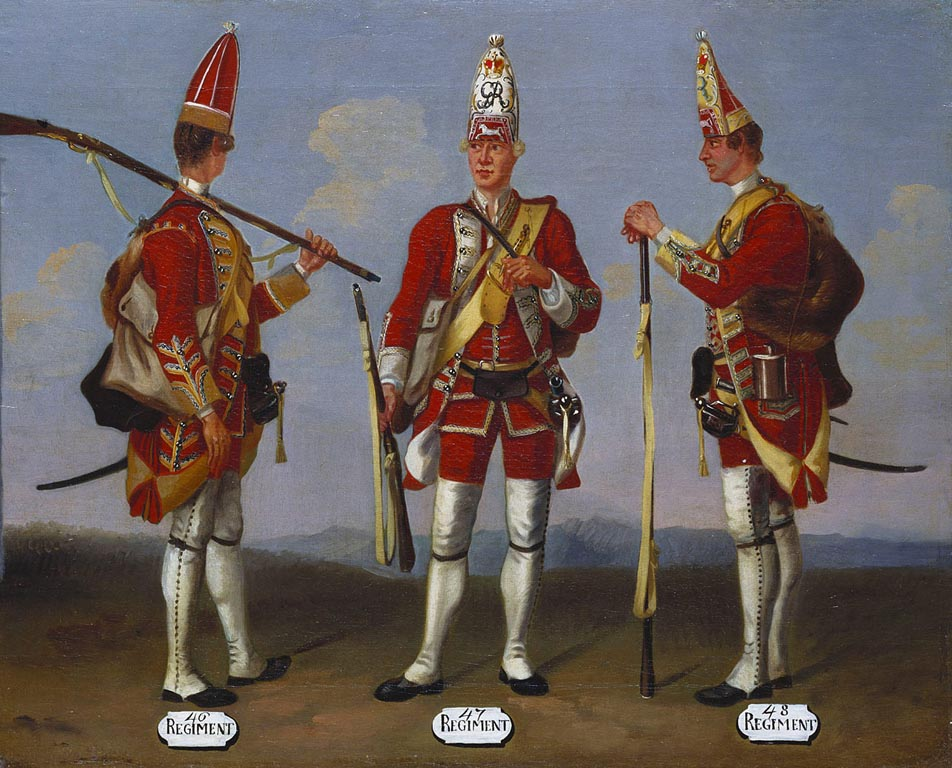
c. 1751 painting of a regimental grenadier (right)

The regiment was raised at Norwich by Colonel James Cholmondeley as James Cholmondeley's Regiment of Foot in 1741 during the War of Austrian Succession. It was sent to Scotland in 1745 and fought against the Jacobites the Battle of Falkirk Muir in January 1746 and the Battle of Culloden in April 1746 during the Jacobite rising. The regiment was deployed to Flanders in spring 1747 for service in the War of the Austrian Succession and saw action at the Battle of Lauffeld in July 1747. It was ranked as the 59th Regiment of Foot in 1747 but re-ranked as the 48th Regiment of Foot in 1751.

The regiment embarked for North America in January 1755 for service in the French and Indian War and, having landed in Virginia in February 1755, saw action at the disastrous Battle of the Monongahela, the Siege of Louisburg in June 1758 and the Battle of the Plains of Abraham in September 1759. It sailed for the West Indies in 1761 and took part in the invasion of Martinique in January 1762 and the Battle of Havana in March 1762. The regiment returned home in 1763 for service in Ireland.

In 1773 the regiment returned to the West Indies. After losing many troops to fever the remnants of the regiment were captured by the French in Dominica in 1778 during the American Revolutionary War; they were interned until 1780 when they were released and allowed to travel home. The regiment was given a county designation in 1782 becoming the 48th (the Northamptonshire) Regiment of Foot.

=== French Revolutionary and Napoleonic Wars ===
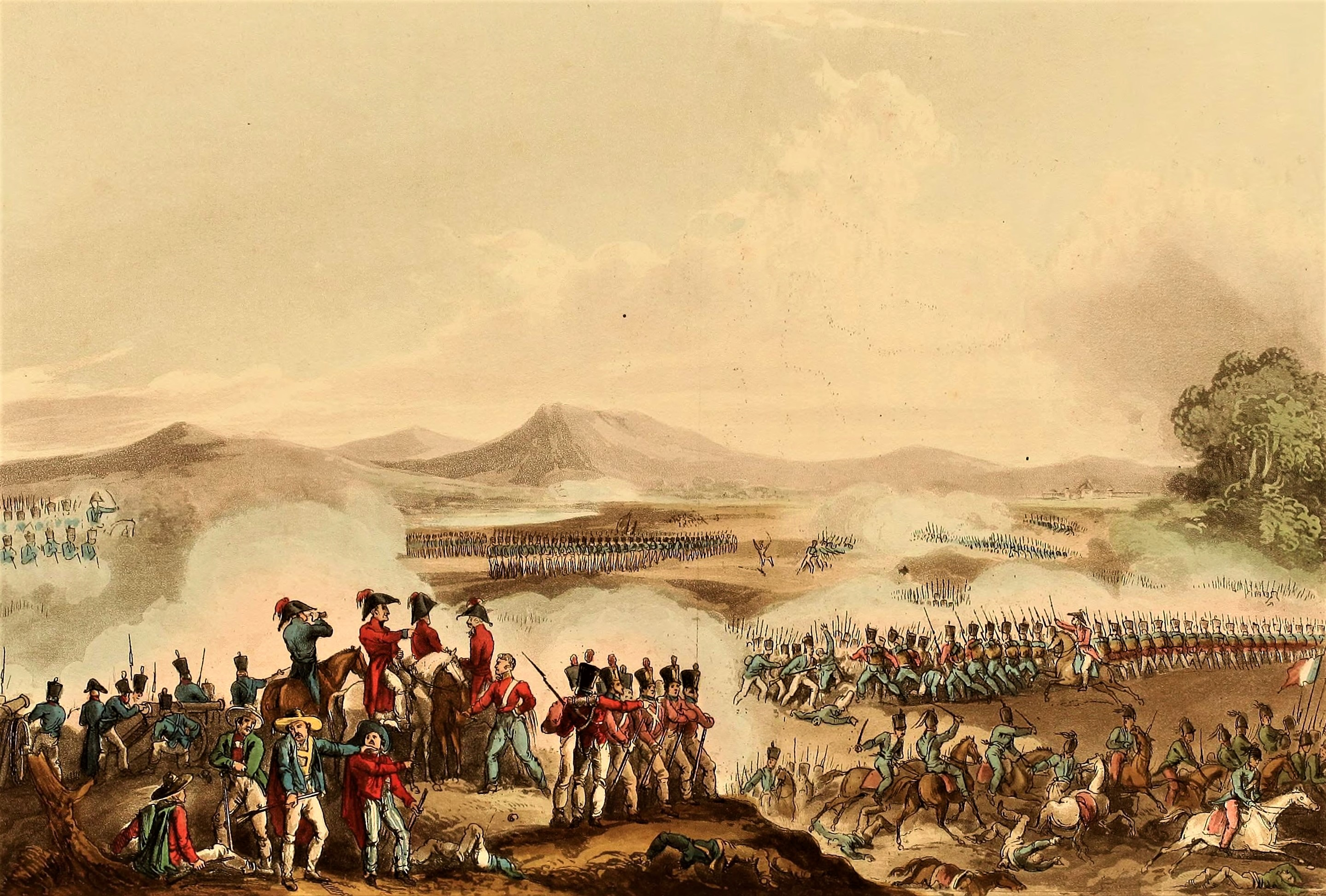
The Battle of Talavera, which the regiment fought in

The regiment returned to the West Indies in 1796 for garrison duty during the French Revolutionary Wars and again lost men to disease before returning home the following year. In 1800 the regiment sailed for Malta where Ensign Thomas Bell, a junior officer of the regiment, planted the regimental colours at Fort St. Angelo following the capture of the island from the French in September 1800.

A second battalion was raised in 1803 and both battalions were deployed to Portugal in spring 1809 for service under General Sir Arthur Wellesley in the Peninsular War. The 2nd battalion saw action at the Second Battle of Porto in May 1809 and both battalions were in action at the Battle of Talavera in July 1809 when they carried out a bayonet charge and then broke the French attack. Both battalions also fought at the Battle of Albuera in May 1811 but the commanding officer, Lieutenant Colonel George Henry Duckworth (a son of Admiral Sir John Duckworth) was killed in action and the losses of the 2nd battalion were such that its remnants were either absorbed into the 1st battalion or sent home later that year.

The 1st battalion went on to fight at the Siege of Badajoz in March 1812, the Battle of Salamanca in July 1812 and the Battle of Vitoria in June 1813. The regiment then pursued the French Army into France and fought at the Battle of the Pyrenees in July 1813, the Battle of Nivelle in November 1813, the Battle of Orthez in February 1814 and the Battle of Toulouse in April 1814. The regiment returned home later that year for service in Ireland.

=== The Victorian era ===
The regiment embarked for New South Wales in the role of convict escorts and guards in August 1817. It was then deployed to India in 1824 and saw action suppressing a rebellion by the forces of Chikka Virarajendra, the Raja of Coorg, in 1834 during the Coorg War. It departed for service in the Crimean War in early 1855 and took part in the Siege of Sevastopol later that year.

As part of the Cardwell Reforms of the 1870s, where single-battalion regiments were linked together to share a single depot and recruiting district in the United Kingdom, the 48th was linked with the 58th (Rutlandshire) Regiment of Foot, and assigned to district no. 29 at Gibraltar Barracks in Northampton. On 1 July 1881 the Childers Reforms came into effect and the regiment amalgamated with the 58th (Rutlandshire) Regiment of Foot to form the Northamptonshire Regiment.

== Battle Honours ==
Battle honours won by the regiment were:

- Peninsular War: Douro, Talavera, Albuhera, Badajoz, Salamanca, Vittoria, Pyrenees, Nivelle, Orthes, Toulouse, Peninsula
- Crimean War: Sevastopol
- Louisburg, Quebec 1759 (awarded to successor regiment, 1882)
- Martinique 1762, Havannah (awarded to successor regiment, 1909)

== Colonels of the Regiment ==
Colonels of the regiment were:

- 1741–1743 Gen. Hon. James Cholmondeley
- 1743–1745 Col. Lord Henry Beauclerk
- 1745–1746 Col. Francis Ligonier
- 1746–1749 F.M. Hon. Henry Seymour Conway
- 1749–1750 Maj-Gen. George Byng, 3rd Viscount Torrington

=== The 48th Regiment of Foot - (1748) ===
- 1750–1752 Lt-Gen. William Home, 8th Earl of Home
- 1752–1755 Lt-Gen. Thomas Dunbar
- 1755–1766 Lt-Gen. Daniel Webb
- 1766–1773 Lt-Gen. William Browne
- 1773–1783 Lt-Gen. William Alexander Sorrell

=== The 48th (Northamptonshire) Regiment - (1782) ===
- 1783–1787 Lt-Gen. Robert Skene
- 1787–1805 Gen. Patrick Tonyn
- 1805–1829 Gen. Lord Charles FitzRoy
- 1829–1843 Gen. Sir Thomas Hislop, 1st Baronet, GCB
- 1843–1850 Lt-Gen. George Middlemore
- 1850–1864 Gen. Sir James Henry Reynett, KCB, KCH
- 1864–1875 Gen. Arthur Dalzell, 9th Earl of Carnwath
- 1875–1881 Gen. William Anson McCleverty

== See also ==
- British Army during the Napoleonic Wars

== Sources ==
- Debrett, John (1840). Debrett's baronetage of England revised, corrected and continued by George William Collen. London: William Pickering.
