= Gibraltar Barracks, Northampton =

Gibraltar Barracks
- Northampton, Northamptonshire
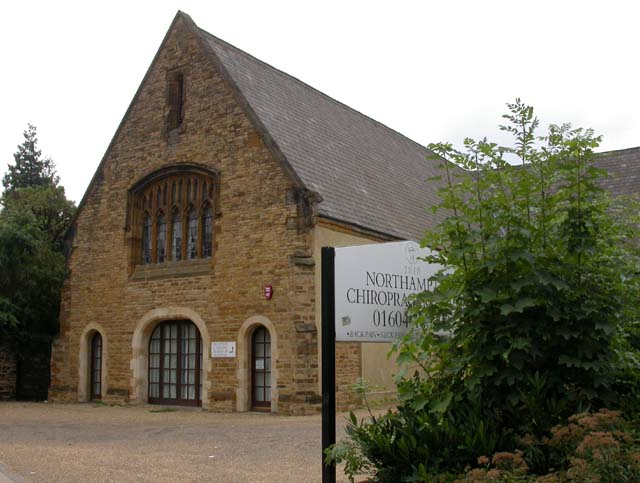
- A school house which originally formed part of Gibraltar Barracks

Site information
- Type: The former school building which formed part of the barracks complex
- Owner: Ministry of Defence
- Operator: British Army

Location
- Location within Northamptonshire
- Coordinates: 52.246°N 0.898°W

Site history
- Built: 1797
- Built for: War Office
- In use: 1797–1969

Garrison information
- Occupants: Northamptonshire Regiment

Gibraltar Barracks is a former military installation at Northampton in Northamptonshire.

== History ==
Permanent barracks were first established in Northampton as part of the British response to the threat of the French Revolution in around 1797. The site comprised three barrack blocks and large parade ground. In 1873 a system of recruiting areas based on counties was instituted under the Cardwell Reforms and the barracks became the depot for the 48th (Northamptonshire) Regiment of Foot and the 58th (Rutlandshire) Regiment of Foot. The barracks were renamed Gibraltar Barracks at that time in recognition of the participation of the 58th regiment in the Great Siege of Gibraltar. Following the Childers Reforms, the 48th and 58th Regiments amalgamated to form the Northamptonshire Regiment with its depot at the barracks in 1881.

The regiment re-located to Simpson Barracks at Wootton in 1939. The barracks were remodelled to accommodate the pay office of Northern Command in 1957 and then demolished when the site was sold to the Royal Mail in 1969. The site was occupied by a Royal Mail Sorting Centre, which has now been replaced by Northampton International Academy. The modern barracks located southwest of the current school, known as Gibraltar Barracks, is now used by the Leicestershire, Northamptonshire and Rutland Army Cadet Force.
