= 1st East Anglian Regiment =

- Active: 29 August 1959 - 1964
- Country: United Kingdom
- Branch: British Army
- Type: Infantry
- Role: Line infantry
- Size: Battalion

Commanders
- Colonel-in-Chief: Princess Margaret, Countess of Snowdon

The 1st East Anglian Regiment (Royal Norfolk and Suffolk) was an infantry regiment of the British Army.

== History ==
As a result of the 1957 Defence Review, the 1st Battalion, Royal Norfolk Regiment and the 1st Battalion, Suffolk Regiment amalgamated on 29 August 1959 to form the 1st Battalion, 1st East Anglian Regiment (Royal Norfolk and Suffolk).

On formation the regiment was based in West Berlin (the location of the 1st Royal Norfolks). In 1961 the Regiment was posted to the United Kingdom for the first since its creation, being based in Harwich. The following year the 1st East Anglians deployed to the South American colony of British Guiana (now the state of Guyana) after violence erupted between the African and Indian ethnic groups there. The Regiment returned to the UK later that year.

In February 1964 the Regiment arrived in Aden as part of the Aden Brigade, seeing active service in the Radfan on the border with South Yemen as part of Radforce, fighting Egyptian-supported guerillas, losing a number of its soldiers in the process. In September that year, while still based there, the Regiment amalgamated with the three other remaining regiments of the East Anglian Brigade (2nd East Anglian Regiment (Duchess of Gloucester's Own Royal Lincolnshire and Northamptonshire), 3rd East Anglian Regiment (16th/44th Foot) and the Royal Leicestershire Regiment) on 1 September 1964 to form one of the new 'large' regiments, the Royal Anglian Regiment; the 1st East Anglians became the 1st Battalion, Royal Anglian Regiment (Royal Norfolk and Suffolk).

== Alliances ==
The regiment's alliances were as follows:

- Australia 12th Infantry Battalion (The Launceston Regiment)—Australia (1959-1960)
- Australia Royal Tasmania Regiment—Australia (1960–64)
- New Zealand The Auckland Regiment (Countess of Ranfurly's) Own—New Zealand (1960–64)

== Associated Cadet Forces ==
The Army sections of some contingents of the Combined Cadet Force were associated with the Regiment, as follows:

- Gresham's School
- Ipswich School
- Woodbridge School
- Wymondham College

| Preceded by Royal Norfolk Regiment; The Suffolk Regiment | 1st East Anglian Regiment; 1959–1964 | Succeeded by Royal Anglian Regiment |
