= Mervyn McCord =

Irish officer of the British Army

Brigadier Mervyn McCord CBE MC
- Brigadier Mervyn McCord CBE, MC in the uniform of Colonel of the Royal Irish Rangers.
- Born: 25 December 1929; Armagh
- Died: 8 February 2013 (aged 83)
- Spouse: Annette Thomson
- Military career
- Allegiance: (United Kingdom)
- Branch: British Army
- Rank: Brigadier
- Unit: Royal Ulster Rifles
- Commands: Ulster Defence Regiment
- Conflicts: Han River
- Awards: CBE, MC

Brigadier Mervyn Noel Samuel McCord, CBE, MC, ADC (25 December 1929 – 8 February 2013) was a decorated Irish officer of the British Army who served with distinction during the Korean War and rose to be commanding officer of the Ulster Defence Regiment.

== Early life ==
McCord was born on 25 December 1929 in Armagh, County Armagh, Northern Ireland. He was the elder son of Major George McCord who had served with the Royal Ulster Rifles. He was educated at the Coleraine Academical Institution. He then went to Queen's University Belfast to read Medicine but left after one year of study.

== Military career ==
McCord received his military training at the Royal Military Academy Sandhurst. While there he was captain of the cross-country team and represented the Academy in athletics. He was commissioned into the Royal Ulster Rifles as a second lieutenant on 16 December 1949 with seniority from the same date. He was given the service number 407952.

His first tour was in 1950/51 to Korea during the Korean War with the 1st Battalion, Royal Ulster Rifles. He was awarded the Military Cross for actions that occurred on the night of 1 to 2 January 1951. General Ridgway decided to withdraw behind the Han River to the south of their position following intense pressure from Chinese force. It was McCord's platoon that brought up the rear of the retreat. The valley through which they were retreating became a death trap when faced with a machine gun post. McCord rallied his troops to try and break through before finally charging the position with a comrade. They successfully destroyed the post making way for the continued retreat. He then lead his troops over the mountains to safety. His citation noted "In his first action, which took place at night, McCord showed great powers of leadership and disregard for personal danger" and "his personal action undoubtedly helped to extricate a number of men from a situation in which they would otherwise have been killed or captured".

He was promoted to lieutenant on 16 December 1951 and to captain on 16 December 1955. Following Korean were postings to Hong Kong and to the British Army of the Rhine. Having attended the Staff College, Camberley, he was promoted to major on 16 December 1962. In 1963, he was attached to the Canadian Army as an exchange officer. He was based at HQ Eastern Command in Halifax, Nova Scotia. He served in Canada as a logistics staff officer. Near the end of his posting, he organised the first Canadian contingent to join the United Nations Peacekeeping Force in Cyprus. He was promoted to lieutenant colonel on 30 June 1970, and posted to Northern Ireland. He served there as chief operations officer at HQ Northern Ireland in Lisburn.

== Honours and decorations ==
McCord was awarded the Military Cross (MC) on 10 July 1951 'in recognition of gallant and distinguished service in Korea'. He was awarded a number of service medals during his career; the Korea Medal, the United Nations Korea Medal, the General Service Medal and the United Nations Service Medal for UNFICYP. He was also awarded the Queen Elizabeth II Silver Jubilee Medal.

In the 1974 New Year Honours, he was appointed Officer of the Order of the British Empire (OBE). He was promoted to Commander of the Order of the British Empire (CBE) on 6 June 1978 'in recognition of distinguished service in Northern Ireland during the period 1 November 1977 – 31 January 1978'.

He was appointed aide-de-camp to the Queen (ADC) on 31 July 1981. He was Deputy Colonel of the Royal Irish Rangers between 1 September 1976 and 1 September 1981. He was appointed honorary colonel of the same regiment on 27 August 1985. He served in that role until 27 August 1990 when he was succeeded by the then Major General Roger Wheeler.

Military offices
Preceded by Harry Baxter	Commander of the Ulster Defence Regiment; 1976 to 1978	Succeeded by David Millar
