= Ulster Defence Regiment =

Former infantry regiment of the British Army

Ulster Defence Regiment CGC
- Active: 1970–1992
- Country: United Kingdom
- Type: Line infantry
- Role: Internal security
- Size: 11 battalions (at peak)
- Regimental Headquarters: Lisburn
- Mottos: "Quis Separabit" (Latin) "Who Shall Separate Us?"
- March: (Quick) Garryowen & Sprig of Shillelagh (Slow) “Eileen Allanagh”

Commanders
- Colonel Commandant: First: General Sir John Anderson GBE, KCB, DSO. Last: General Sir Charles Huxtable, KCB, CBE, DL
- Colonel of the Regiment: Colonel Sir Dennis Faulkner CBE

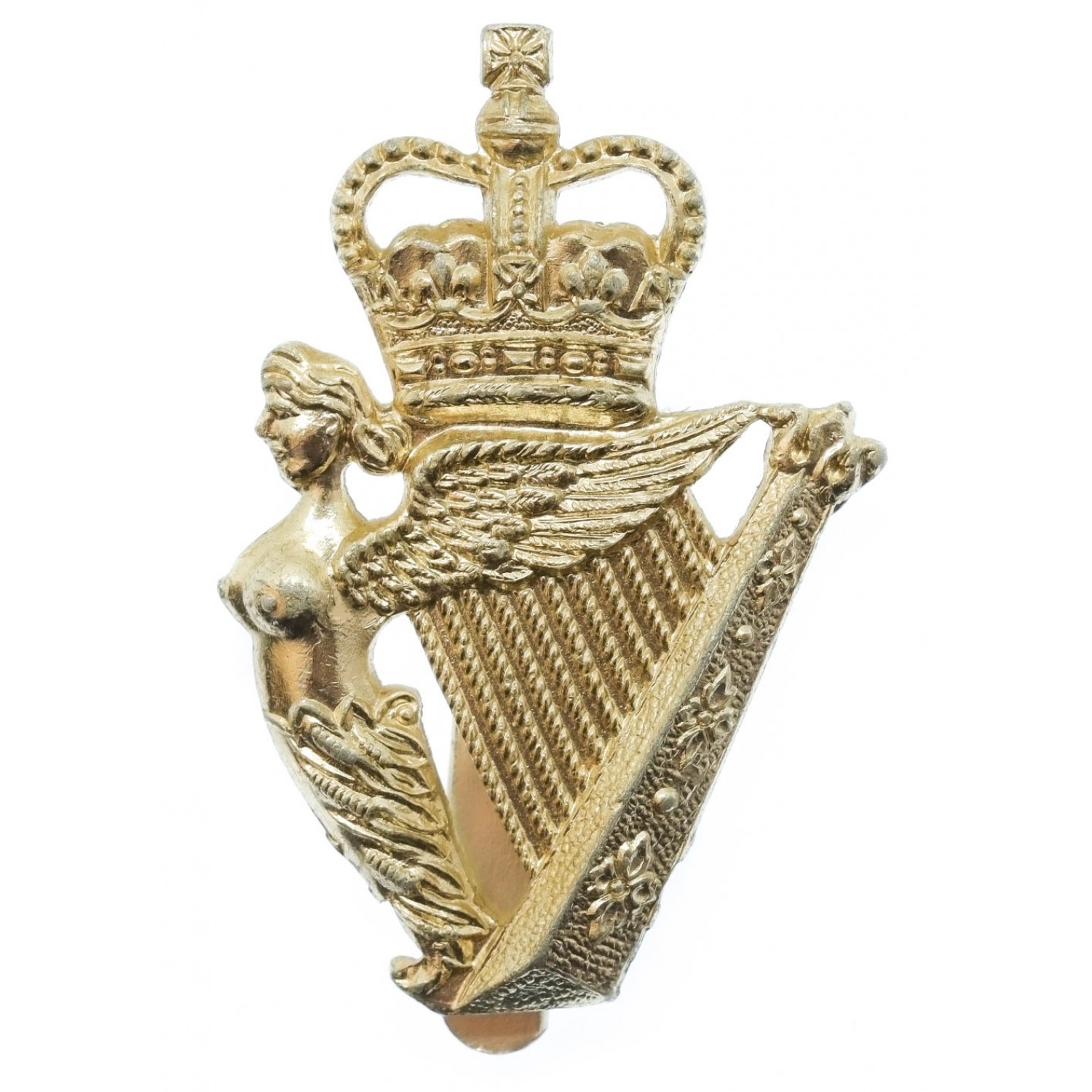
Ulster Defence Regiment cap badge

The Ulster Defence Regiment (UDR) was an infantry regiment of the British Army established in 1970, with a comparatively short existence ending in 1992. Raised through public appeal, newspaper and television advertisements, their official role was the "defence of life or property in Northern Ireland against armed attack or sabotage" but unlike troops from Great Britain they were never used for "crowd control or riot duties in cities". At the time the UDR was the largest infantry regiment in the British Army, formed with seven battalions plus another four added within two years.

It consisted mostly of part-time volunteers until 1976, when a full-time cadre was added. Recruiting in Northern Ireland at a time of intercommunal strife, some of its (mostly Ulster Protestant) members were involved in sectarian killings. The regiment was originally intended to more accurately reflect the demographics of Northern Ireland, and began in 1970 with Catholic recruits accounting for 16% of its soldiers; but by the end of 1972, after the introduction of internment this had dropped to around 3%. It is doubtful if any other unit of the British Army has ever come under the same sustained criticism as the UDR.

Uniquely in the British Army, the regiment was on continuous active service throughout its 22 years of service. It was also the first infantry regiment of the British Army to fully incorporate women into its structure. In 1992, the UDR was amalgamated with the Royal Irish Rangers to form the Royal Irish Regiment. In 2006, the regiment was retroactively awarded the Conspicuous Gallantry Cross.

== Background ==
The UDR was raised in 1970, soon after the beginning of the Northern Ireland "Troubles". Before then, the main security forces were the Royal Ulster Constabulary (RUC) and the Ulster Special Constabulary (USC), otherwise known as the "B Specials". Catholics were reluctant to join what they saw as unionist militias that lacked impartiality leading to the forces becoming almost entirely Protestant.

Large scale intercommunal rioting in 1969 stretched police resources in Northern Ireland, so the British Army was deployed to assist the police. On 28 August 1969 security in Northern Ireland, including the USC, was put under the direct control of the General Officer Commanding in Northern Ireland, General Ian Freeland.

The USC, which had no training in riot control, was mobilised to assist the RUC. A catalogue of incidents ensued, such as Specials from Tynan shooting dead an unarmed civil rights demonstrator in Armagh on 14 August 1969. While the Northern Ireland cabinet remained supportive of the USC, it was put to them at a London meeting on 19 August that disbanding the USC was top of the British government's agenda.

The Hunt Report commissioned by the Government of Northern Ireland published on 3 October 1969, recommended that the RUC "should be relieved of all duties of a military nature as soon as possible". Further; a "locally recruited part-time force, under the control of the G.O.C., Northern Ireland, should be raised" ... and that it "together with the police volunteer reserve, should replace the Ulster Special Constabulary". The new force was to be "impartial in every sense" and "remove the responsibility of military-style operations from the police".

The British government accepted the findings of the Hunt Report and published a Bill and white paper on 12 November 1969 to begin the process of establishing the UDR. Parliamentary debate in Westminster highlighted concerns that members of the USC were to be allowed to join the new force.

A working party was set up at Headquarters Northern Ireland chaired by Major General A.J. Dyball of the Royal Ulster Rifles, then the deputy director of operations in Northern Ireland. The team included a staff officer from the Ministry of Defence, a member of the Ministry of Home Affairs (Stormont) and Lieutenant Colonel S Miskimmon, the USC staff officer to the RUC. After discussions, they advocated a strength of 6,000 men (2,000 more than the Hunt recommendations), combat dress for duties, a dark green parade uniform, county shoulder titles, and a "red hand of Ulster" cap badge. The rank of "volunteer" was suggested for private soldiers. They recommended that each battalion should have a mobile force of two platoons, each equipped with a Land Rovers fitted for radio plus three "manpack" radio sets.

After the presentation to the Ministry of Defence, a government white paper confirmed the agreed aspects of the new force and its task as:

to support the regular forces in Northern Ireland in protecting the border and the state against armed attack and sabotage. It will fulfill this task by undertaking guard duties at key points and installations, by carrying out patrols and by establishing checkpoints and roadblocks when required to do so. In practice, such tasks are most likely to prove necessary in rural areas. It is not the intention to employ the new forces on crowd control or riot duties in cities.

== Name ==
When the Ulster Defence Regiment Bill, the legislation establishing the regiment, was being debated in Parliament there was considerable discussion about its proposed name. An amendment to the legislation was proposed that would have given the regiment the name "Northern Ireland Territorial Force". Proponents of this amendment were concerned to ensure that the word "Ulster" be removed from the name of the regiment. They argued that the name "Ulster" evoked emotive resistance from many Catholics in Northern Ireland and that the term "Ulster" had been associated with the Orange organisations and other organisations perceived as excluding Catholics e.g. the Ulster Protestant Volunteers, the Ulster Constitution Defence Committee, the Ulster Volunteer Force and the Ulster Special Constabulary. They argued "Ulster" had strong party political and partisan connotations and would deter Catholic participation in the new regiment. One speaker said the name "Ulster" would "frighten the Catholics away". They also argued that as three of Ulster's nine counties were not in Northern Ireland, the title was inaccurate, especially given that persons from outside of Northern Ireland would be prohibited by law from joining the regiment.

For the British government's part, those defending the proposed name argued that the term "Ulster" should still be included because of precedent; in the past, it had been attached to certain regiments in Northern Ireland. Another opponent of the amendment disagreed that Catholics would be put off joining because of the force. He pointed to the Ulster Unionist Party as an example of an organisation that included the word Ulster and had many Catholic members. The Under-Secretary of State for the Army said "the Government considered that the use of the word 'Ulster' is, frankly, unimportant". Another speaker said a majority in Northern Ireland prefer the word "Ulster". The proposed amendment was defeated and the UDR got its name.

== Formation and recruitment ==
Ulster Defence Regiment Act 1969 (Note: Section 6(1).)
- Act of Parliament
- Parliament of the United Kingdom
- Long title: An Act to establish the Ulster Defence Regiment and for purposes connected therewith.
- Citation: 1969 c. 65
- Territorial extent: United Kingdom

Dates
- Royal assent: 18 December 1969
- Commencement: 1 January 1970 (Note: Section 6(2). The Ulster Defence Regiment Act 1969 (Commencement) Order 1969.)
- Repealed: 20 April 1980
Other legislation
Repealed by	Reserve Forces Act 1980

Status: Repealed

Text of statute as originally enacted

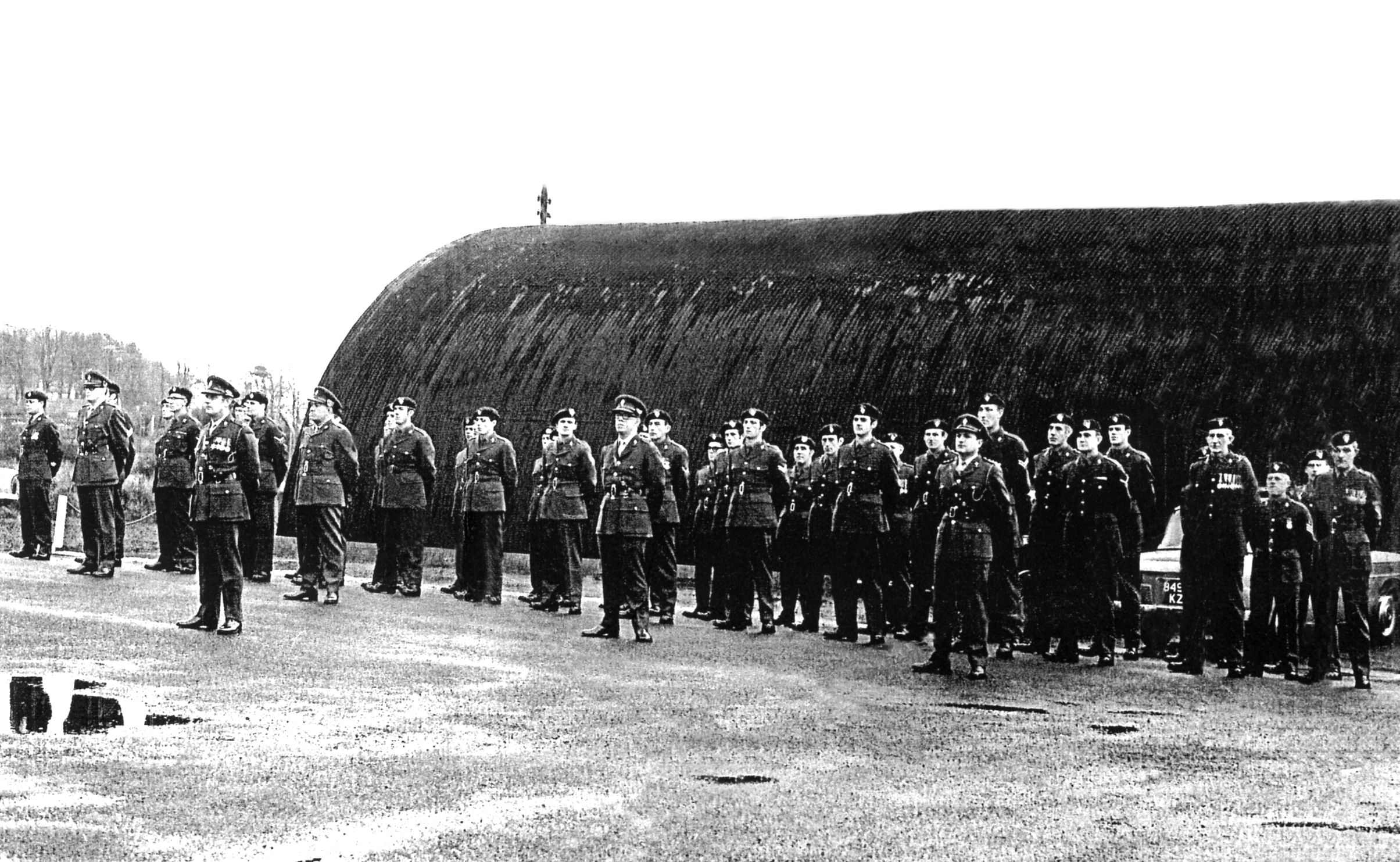
C Company, 1 UDR on parade at Steeple Camp, County Antrim, Remembrance Sunday 1970

The Ulster Defence Regiment Act 1969 (c. 65) received royal assent on 18 December 1969 and was brought into force on 1 January 1970.

General Sir John Anderson GCB, KCB DSO (5th Royal Inniskilling Dragoon Guards) was appointed as the first Colonel Commandant. He came to be known as the "Father of the Regiment". The first regimental commander was a WW2 veteran of some distinction, Brigadier Logan Scott-Bowden CBE, DSO, MC & Bar.

Regimental Headquarters was set up in a small bungalow behind the NAAFI shop at Thiepval Barracks, Lisburn.

Recruitment began on 1 January with a press conference. Advertisements appeared in local newspapers informing the Northern Ireland public that: "There's a new regiment in the army. We want you to help us form it." A coupon was provided for applicants to fill in, alternatively, those interested could pick up an information leaflet and application form from their local army barracks, TA Centre, Post Office, police station or library. A one-minute television commercial was produced which included a personal appeal by Brigadier Scott-Bowden. Recruiting was open to all "male citizens of good character" between the ages of 18 and 55. Application forms were sent to all members of the USC, which was soon to be wound up.

Vetting was carried out by a regular army team of mostly retired officers from outside Northern Ireland including a vice admiral and a number of major generals. Each applicant had to provide two references and the referees would be interviewed by a vetting officer. Applicants were divided into three categories: those who were immediately deemed acceptable, those who were to be immediately rejected, and those whose applications threw up doubt about their suitability. All applications were supposed to be submitted to the RUC Special Branch and Criminal Investigation Department, but in practice, this didn't always happen because of the initially high number of applicants.

On 13 January 1970 seven "training majors" from the regular army reported for duty. None had served in Northern Ireland previously. Their job was to raise each battalion and have it ready for duty on 1 April. These came to be known as TISOs (training, intelligence, and security officers). Each was assisted by a regular army quartermaster, a corporal clerk, a civil service Clerical Officer to act as Chief Clerk, and a typist.

Premises were acquired from diverse sources including wooden huts in army training centres, USC huts or whatever accommodation could be found in regular army barracks or Territorial Army Centres.

Seven battalions were formed initially: 1st (County Antrim); 2nd (County Armagh); 3rd (County Down); 4th (County Fermanagh); 5th (County Londonderry); 6th (County Tyrone) and 7th (City of Belfast). On 1 April 1970 the regiment joined the British Army's Order of Battle and became operational.

=== Commissioned officer recruitment ===
For each battalion there was a minimum requirement of:

- 1 lieutenant colonel
- 6 majors
- 7 captains
- 25 lieutenants (including 2nd lieutenants)

To recruit company and platoon officers, Scott-Bowden and his subordinates were obliged to award instant commissions to people deemed suitable. The ideal candidates were sought in the USC, reserve forces, university Officers' Training Corps and Army Cadet Force. In various battalions officers of company and platoon rank could be found who had served in the USC, the Regular and Territorial Army, the Royal Navy, the Royal Air Force, the Royal Marines, the Indian Army and even the United States Army. In addition to the problem of finding officers there had to be observance of the Protestant/Catholic ratio but by March 1971, 18 Catholic officers had been recruited and the total number of officers was just enough for battalions to function at their current strengths. This rose to 23. All seven battalions were led by former commandants of the USC.

=== Non-commissioned officer recruitment/appointment ===
For each battalion there was a minimum requirement of:

- 1 Regimental Sergeant Major (Warrant Officer 1st Class (WO1))
- 7 Warrant Officers 2nd Class (WO2)
- 25 Sergeants
- 25 Corporals
- 25 Lance Corporals

The appointment of non-commissioned officers (NCOs) was carried out in a variety of ways too. In most cases, men were selected who had previously held non-commissioned rank in any of the armed forces or the USC. In at least one case (2 UDR) they were chosen by the men themselves. In some battalions, men were appointed as lance corporals (l/cpl) on a duty-by-duty basis to assess their worth. In the Newry (C) company of 3 UDR], many of the recruits had formerly been soldiers in the local territorial company of the Royal Irish Fusiliers, including the company commander. It was a simple matter to appoint men who had previously been his NCOs and he supplemented these with former sergeants from the USC. The filling of senior NCO posts in this manner did have a drawback in that many men of comparatively young ages who had considerable years of service before retirement or promotion created a "promotion block".

=== USC recruitment ===
B Specials UDR applications
Battalion	Applications	Accepted	USC	Accepted
Antrim (1 UDR)	575	221	220	93
Armagh (2 UDR)	615	370	402	277
Down (3 UDR)	460	229	195	116
Fermanagh (4 UDR)	471	223	386	193
County Londonderry (5 UDR)	671	382	338	219
Tyrone (6 UDR)	1,187	637	813	419
Belfast (7 UDR)	797	378	70	36
Total	4,791	2,440	2,424	1,423

The response from the B Specials was mixed. Some felt betrayed and resigned immediately, while others made application to join the UDR as soon as forms were available. Others joined the newly formed RUC Reserve instead, especially in Belfast, where during the first month of recruiting, only 36 Specials applied to join the UDR compared to an average of 29% – 2,424, one thousand of whom were rejected, mainly on the grounds of age and fitness. Around 75% of the men of the Tyrone B Specials applied, of whom 419 were accepted and, as a result, 6 UDR started life as the only battalion more or less up to strength, and remained so during its history. In five of the seven battalions, former Specials made up more than half of personnel; in 4 UDR, it reached 87%. The story was different in Belfast (10%) and the rest of Antrim (42%), where the figures were more balanced, with a correspondingly higher proportion of Catholic recruits.

Some former B Specials felt so aggrieved at the loss of their force that they booed and jeered passing UDR patrols. Most anger seemed to be in County Down, where the USC District adjutant actively campaigned to persuade his men not to apply.

=== Catholic recruitment ===
The Belfast Telegraph stated on 18 February 1970 that the first two soldiers reported as signing up were a 19-year-old Catholic and a 47-year-old Protestant. The regiment began with Catholic recruits accounting for 18% of the membership. Many were ex-regular soldiers, "eager to get back into uniform". By 1987 Catholic membership was 4%.

=== Recruitment summary ===
By March 1970, there had been 4,791 applications to join, of which 946 were from Catholics and 2,424 from current or former members of the B-Specials. 2,440 had been accepted, including 1,423 from current or former B-Specials.

As the percentage of recruits from both communities did not reflect the religious demographics of Northern Ireland, it never became the model Lord Hunt intended. Catholics continued to join the regiment, but the numbers were never representative. They were highest in 3 UDR, which had the highest percentage of Catholics throughout the Troubles, beginning with 30%, although this was a much lower percentage than that of the battalion area. Some sections were staffed entirely by Catholics, which led to protests from the B Specials Association that in 3 UDR "preference for promotion and allocation of appointments was being given to Catholics". This was partially explained by the fact that in the mostly Catholic town of Newry, the Territorial Army company of the Royal Irish Fusiliers had been disbanded in 1968 and the vast majority of its soldiers had joined the UDR en masse.

The company commander of C Company, (Newry), 3 UDR, was the former commander of the TA unit and was pleased to see that virtually all of his TA soldiers were on parade, in the TA Centre, in exactly the same drill hall as they had previously used, for the first night of the new regiment. He noted there were some former B Specials in the room and observed they did not initially associate with the others – not on the grounds of religion but because the former TA soldiers all knew each other socially and sat together on canteen breaks whereas the former specials kept to their group of comrades, but within a week both had melded together.

By 1 April 1970, only 1,606 of the desired 4,000 men had been enlisted, and the UDR began its duties much under strength. The regiment continued to grow, however. In 1973 numbers peaked at 9,100 (all part-time) and at the time of amalgamation had stabilised its numbers at 2,797 permanent cadre soldiers and 2,620 part-time.

== Structure ==
=== Command structure ===
UDR stable belt colours

Unlike the USC, who were controlled by the Stormont government in Belfast, the UDR was under the direct command of the General Officer Commanding Northern Ireland (GOCNI), the commander of the British Army in Northern Ireland. A six-man UDR Advisory Council (three Protestant and three Catholic) was formed and chaired by the colonel commandant. Its brief was "to advise the GOCNI on policy for the administration of the Ulster Defence Regiment, in particular on recruitment; and on such specific matters as the GOCNI might refer to the council."

The regiment would be commanded by a regular army brigadier. Battalions were to be commanded by "local members of the force".

Commanding officers were initially former County Commandants from the disbanded USC. All were men of previous military experience, such as Dublin-born Desmond Woods who had at one time been the youngest winner of the Military Cross (serving with the Royal Ulster Rifles) and Michael Torrens-Spence DSO, DSC, AFC. All were appointed lieutenant colonel on a one-year contract. However, some of these men were already past retirement age and after their year's contract was up they were replaced by lieutenant colonels from the regular army, the first of these being Lt Col Dion Beard of the 1st Royal Tank Regiment (1 RTR) who took over at 3 UDR on 15 February 1971. The policy of appointing regular officers was not universally popular within the regiment, with the public or with some politicians, but the British Army persisted in replacing former USC commanding officers and by the time of amalgamation, around 400 regular army officers had served in these posts, some of whom went on to achieve general officer rank.

A newspaper for the regiment was published, called "Defence".

=== Battalion structure ===
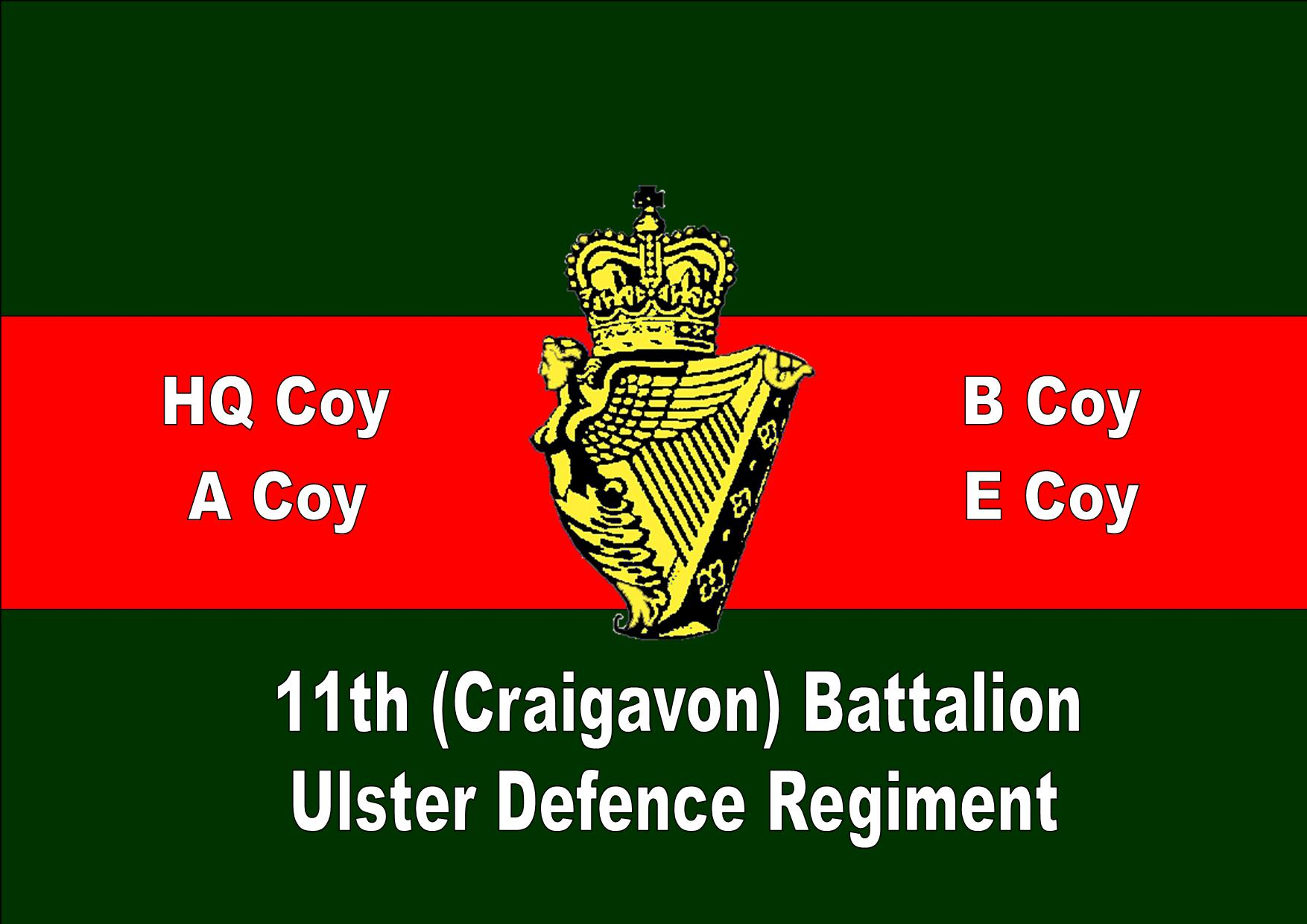
UDR main gate sign denoting which companies are in barracks

The first seven battalions raised made the UDR the largest infantry regiment in the British Army at that time. Two years later, four more were added, taking the total to eleven – 8th (County Tyrone); 9th (Country Antrim); 10th (City of Belfast) and 11th (Craigavon).

The regiment was described in 1972 as:

Organised into 11 Battalions (59) companies: two in Belfast and the remainder cover county or sub-county areas. Seven of the eleven are commanded by regular commanding officers. In addition the training majors, quartermaster, regimental sergeant majors, chief clerks, and signaller NCOs are also regulars. There are a number of 'conrate' (full-time UDR) posts in each unit, including adjutants, permanent staff instructors, security guards, etc. Many of the officer and senior rank conrates are ex-regulars. The remainder are part-timers. Their main tasks are guarding key points, patrolling, and surveillance, and manning vehicle checkpoints. They do not operate in the 'hard' areas of Belfast, and are not permitted to become involved in crowd confrontations anywhere. Men are armed with self-loading rifles or sub-machine guns. The current strength of the Regiment is 7910.

Until 1976 the full-time cadre were "conrates" (so called because they had a "consolidated rate of pay") whose duties consisted of guarding bases and carrying out administrative tasks. The role of the regiment was expanded by raising full-time platoons, known as "Operations Platoons", to perform duties on a 24-hour basis. The first of these was raised at 2 UDR under the command of a sergeant. By the end of the 1970s, the permanent cadre had been raised to sixteen platoons. These were then increased to company strength with the conrate role being phased out and full-time UDR soldiers undertaking their own guard duties and administration.

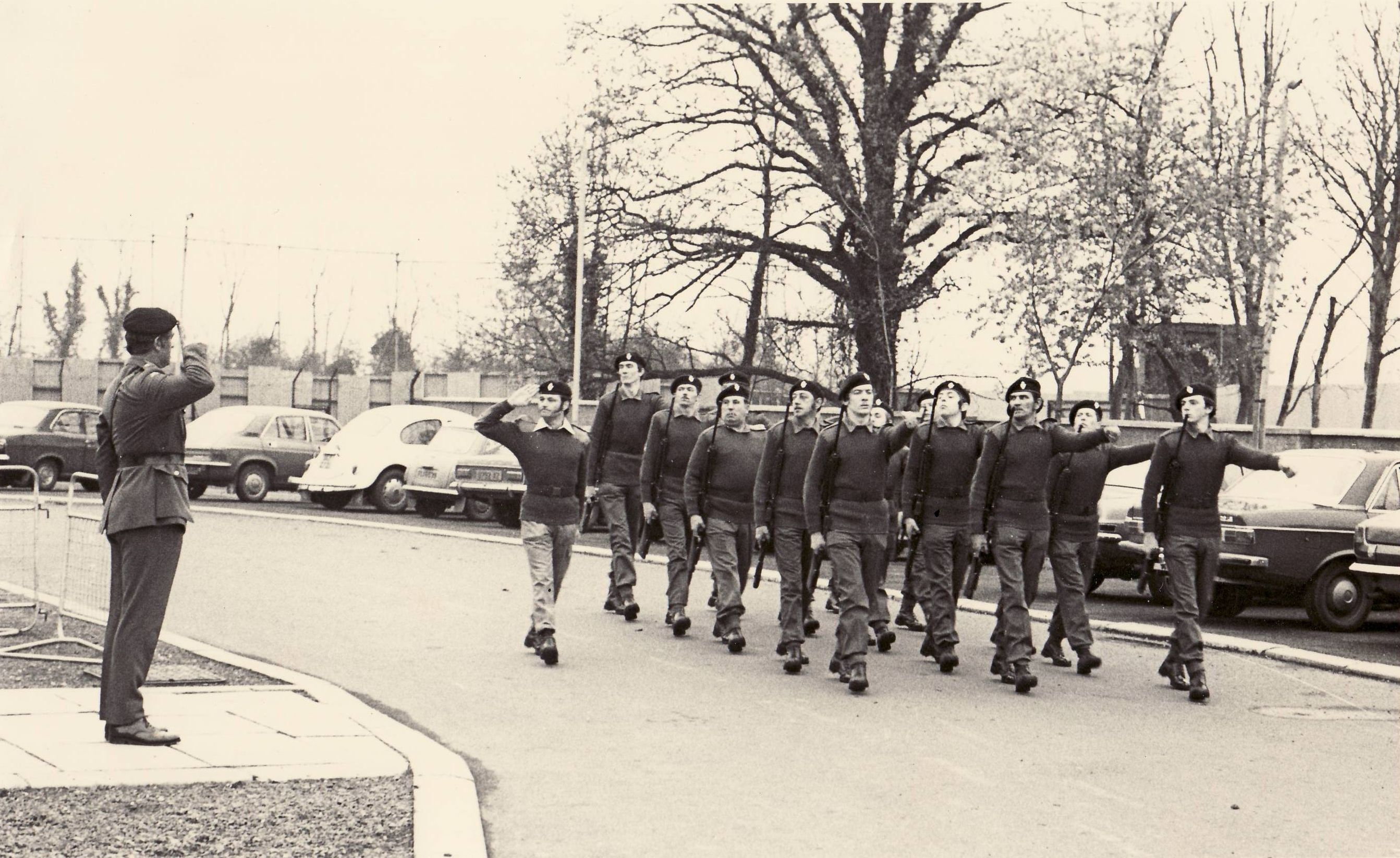
UDR march past at Mahon Road Barracks, Portadown

The full-time element eventually increased to more than half the total personnel.

In 1990, the regiment's numbers stood at 3,000 part-time and 3,000 full-time soldiers, with 140 attached regular army personnel in key command and training positions. The standard of training of the permanent cadre made them suitable to be used in much the same way as regular soldiers and it was not uncommon for regular army units to then come under local command and control of a UDR Battalion Headquarters.

The dispersal of UDR soldiers into their areas of responsibility was through sub-barracks of platoon or company size. Battalion headquarters would usually be located in the county town, but not always as some counties had two battalions. Guarded by conrate soldiers, these barracks would become doubly active after 6pm as part-time soldiers arrived for evening duties. After Ulsterisation began in 1976, many battalion headquarters had full-sized permanent cadre companies and these would maintain a 24-hour presence in the battalion's "tactical area of responsibility" (TAOR).

An example of this structure can be seen in the make-up of 2 UDR based at Drumadd Barracks in Armagh:

Company	Part/Full-time	Base	Hours of duty	Number on duty
HQ Coy	Mixed	Armagh, Command, Control & Admin	Admin 9–5, Watchkeepers 24 hr	9-5 = 15, 24hr = 5
A Coy	Full-time	Armagh	24	35
B Coy	Part-time	Armagh/Newtownhamilton/Caledon	7 pm – 2 am	35
C Coy	Part-time	Glenanne	7 pm – 2 am	35
D Coy	Part-time	Loughgall	7 pm – 2 am	35

Sub-headquarter units would maintain contact with their own patrols and HQ by radio. In many cases the radios were operated by Greenfinches (female soldiers), whose husbands or sons and/or daughters were on one of the active patrols, which led to tense moments when mobile units or foot patrols came under attack and submitted a "contact report" by radio.

== Uniform, armament and equipment ==
=== Uniform ===
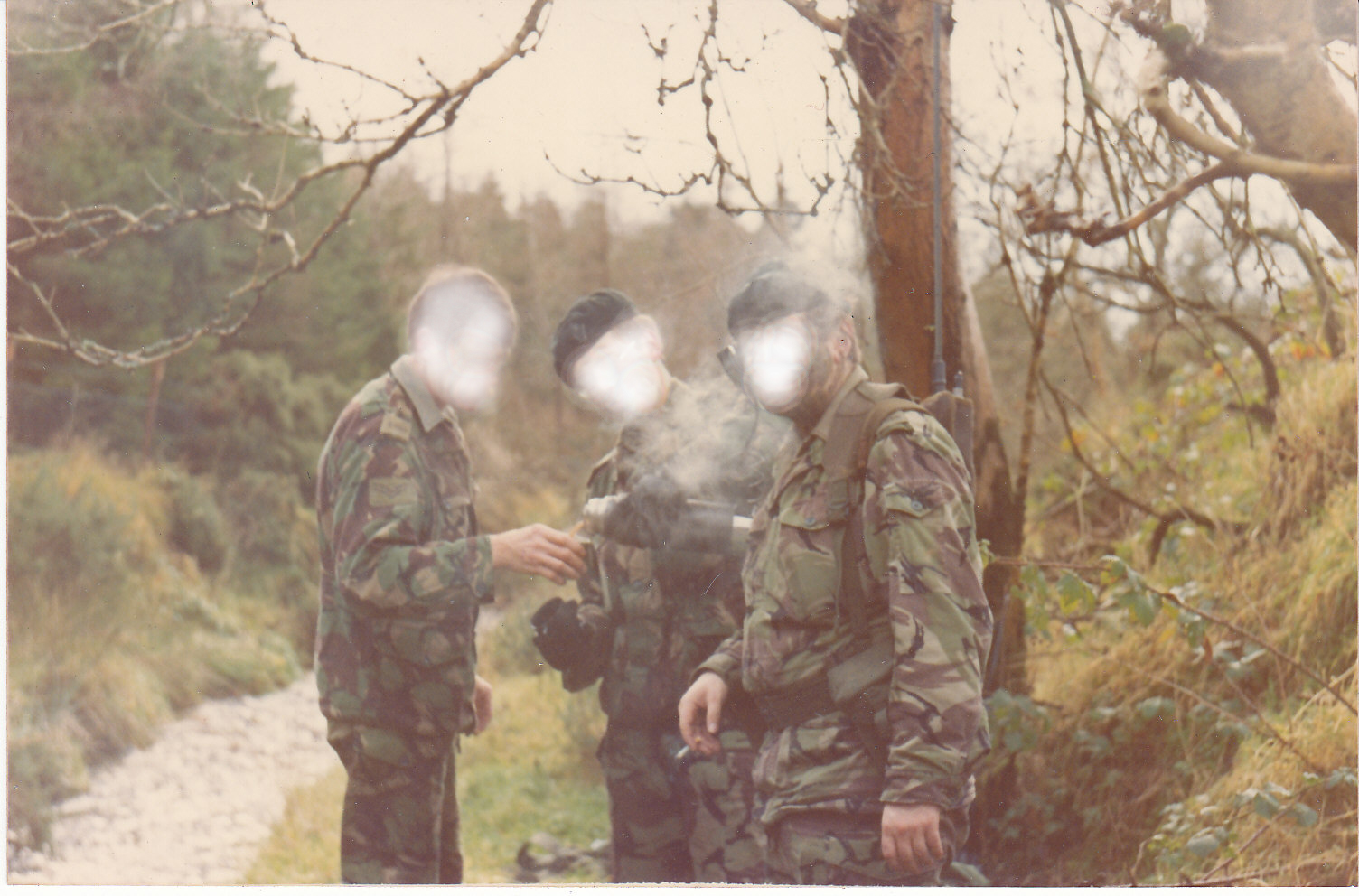
Soldiers of 11 UDR on a patrol break in the South Armagh area. The soldier on the right is carrying a jamming device to prevent the detonation of radio-controlled improvised explosive devices.

The early image of the regiment, due to equipment and uniform shortages, was of a rag-tag bunch using World War II weaponry, old army uniforms and carrying pockets full of loose change in order to make reports from public telephone boxes. Many of the soldiers were veterans of earlier campaigns with the British Army or had been in the Special Constabulary and were middle-aged; this earned them the public nickname of "Dad's Army" – the sobriquet given to the Home Guard during World War II.

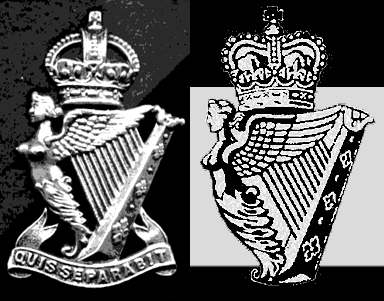
This illustration shows how the badge of the UDR (right) was created from the badge of the Ulster Rifles (left).

After equipment shortages were resolved, male soldiers dressed in a similar fashion to regular army units. Camouflage jackets were worn and headgear was a distinctive dark green beret with a gold coloured "Maid of Erin" style harp, surmounted by St Edward's Crown (in later years this was dulled down by blackening, a common practice for units of the British army when wearing cap badges on operational duties). The badge was a direct copy of the Royal Ulster Rifles cap badge with the Latin motto removed from its base. Female "Greenfinch" soldiers wore combat jackets and rifle green skirts with the UDR beret and cap badge. For ceremonial occasions men wore a rifle green version of British Army (No.1 Temperate ceremonial). Female "best dress" was a rifle green jacket and skirt. The beret was retained as headgear for men and women in best dress. On the formation of operations platoons, narrow coloured slides were adopted and worn on the shoulder straps in battalion colours. These indicated to the trained eye that the wearers were full-time soldiers. They were dispensed with as the operations platoons expanded into full-time rifle companies and were replaced by battalion-specific epaulette slides. Rank badges were as for infantry NCOs and officers and worn in the same fashion.

=== Armaments ===
Initially, the weapons issued were of WW2 vintage such as Lee–Enfield No.4 rifles and Sten submachine guns. In early 1972 the rifles were replaced with the standard issue L1A1 Self-Loading Rifle (SLR). Other weaponry became available too: 9 mm Browning pistols (Browning 9mm), the Sterling submachine guns (SMG), the L4A4 Light Machine Guns (Bren LMG) and L7A2 General Purpose Machine Gun (GPMG)s. Small stocks of Federal Riot Guns (FRG) were kept and used to fire plastic bullets to knock down doors and other obstacles during search operations. A number of Carl Gustav (Charlie G) 84 mm recoilless rifles were stocked but rarely deployed as the weapon was unsuited to most operations. (see Boat Sections below). SLRs were replaced in 1988 by the SA80 and at the same time machine guns were superseded by the Light Support Weapon. Metal caltrops were used at vehicle check points to puncture tyres on cars trying to escape roadblocks.

For personal protection off duty, some soldiers were issued with a Walther PP. Major Ken Maginnis acquired permission for some to purchase Browning 9mm pistols at £200 each. These were deemed to be more effective. In the late 1980s the Walther PP was replaced by the Walther P5, considered a more practical weapon because of its size and ballistic capabilities. Any soldier considered to be at particularly high risk would be permitted to keep his rifle at home. This policy was known as "weapons out" and was reduced by 75%, when SLRs replaced Lee–Enfields in 1972, due to the high number of rifles stolen by paramilitaries.

The weapons out policy was eventually discontinued on the introduction of the SA80 rifle by that time only a small number were held at home by soldiers of 6 UDR.

==== Weapons used by the Ulster Defence Regiment ====
Firearms

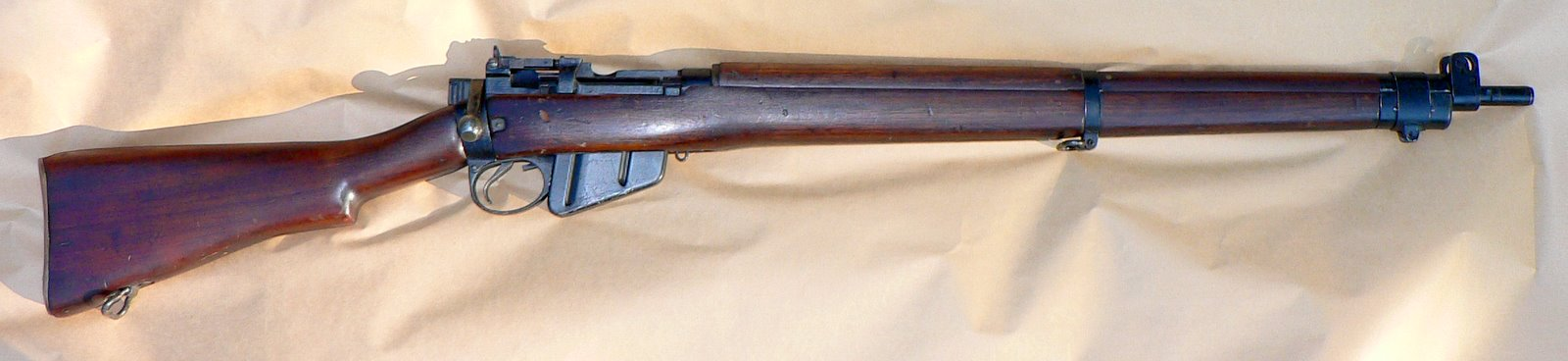
No4 Rifle

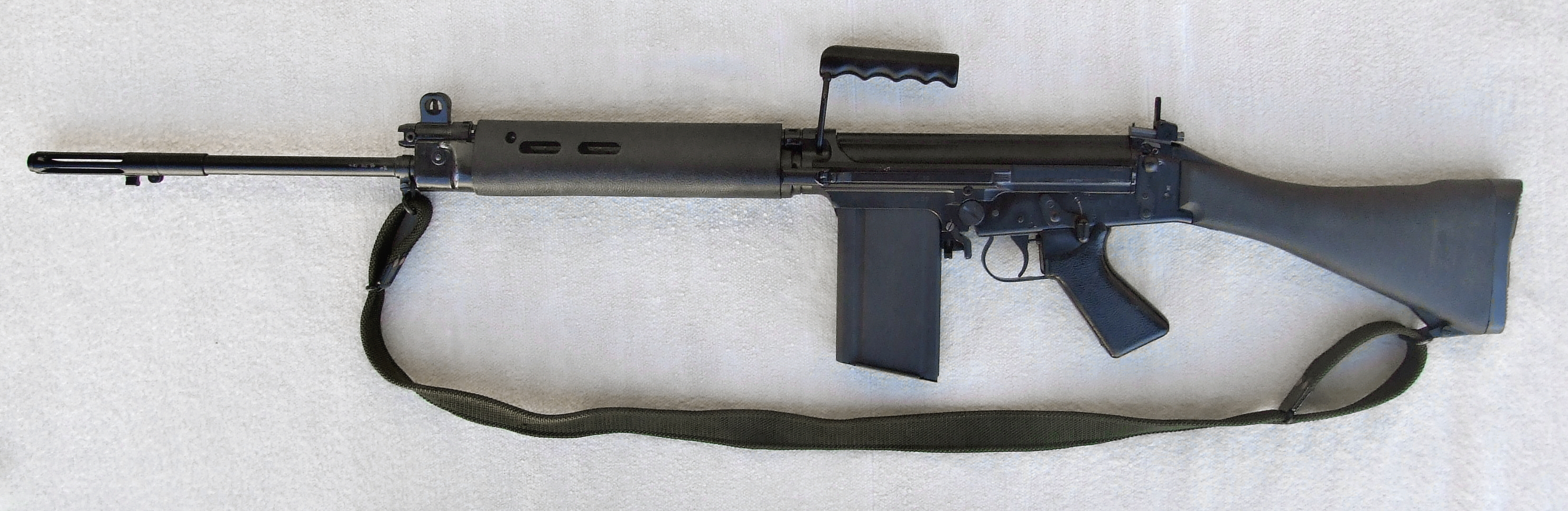
L1A1 SLR (Rifle)

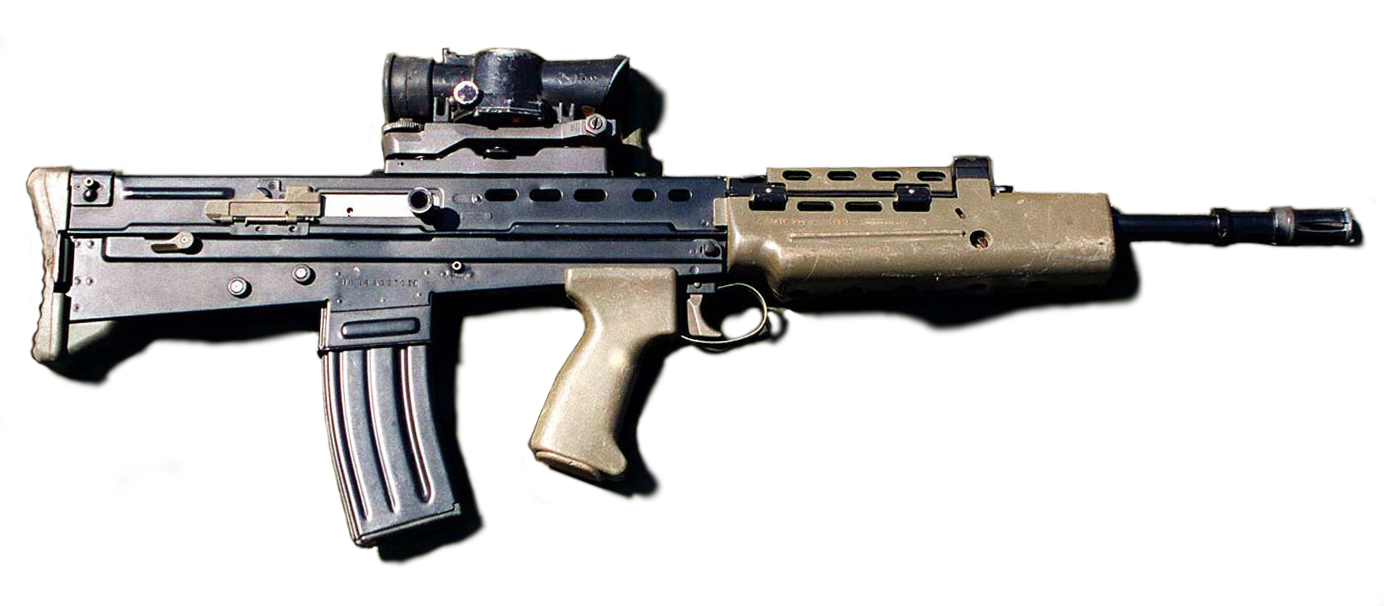
SA-80 L85A1 rifle

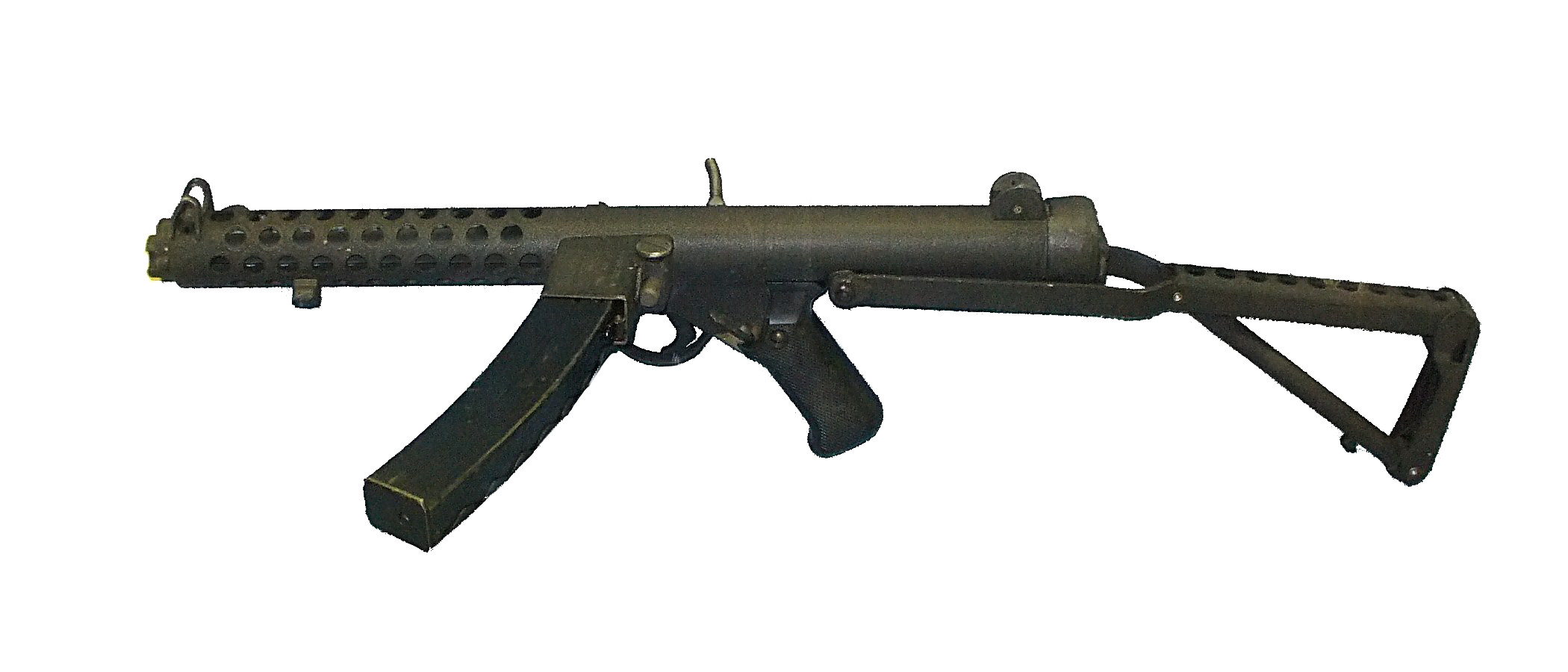
Sterling SMG

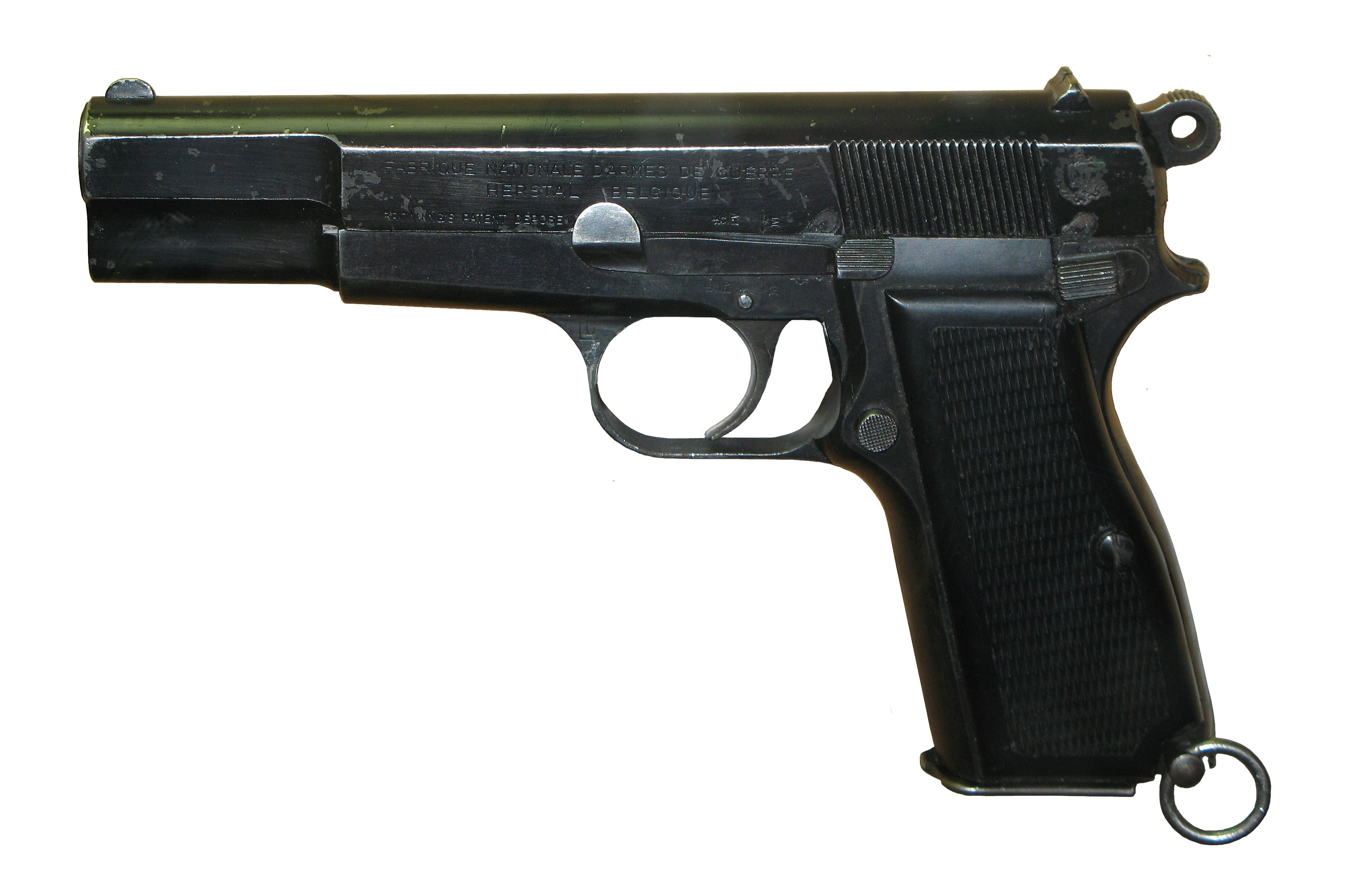
Browning 9mm

=== Equipment ===
==== Transport ====
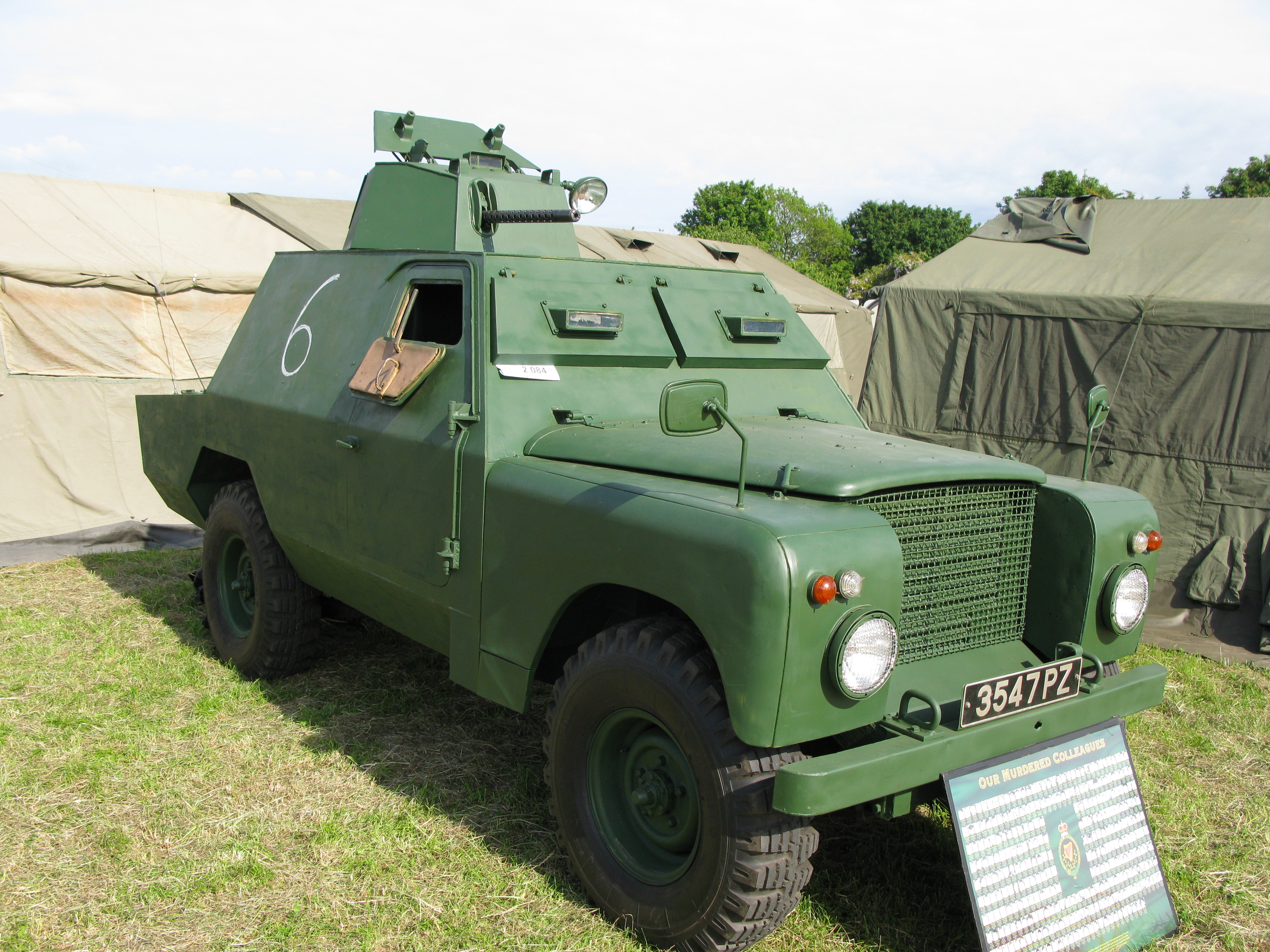
Shorland armoured car used by the UDR

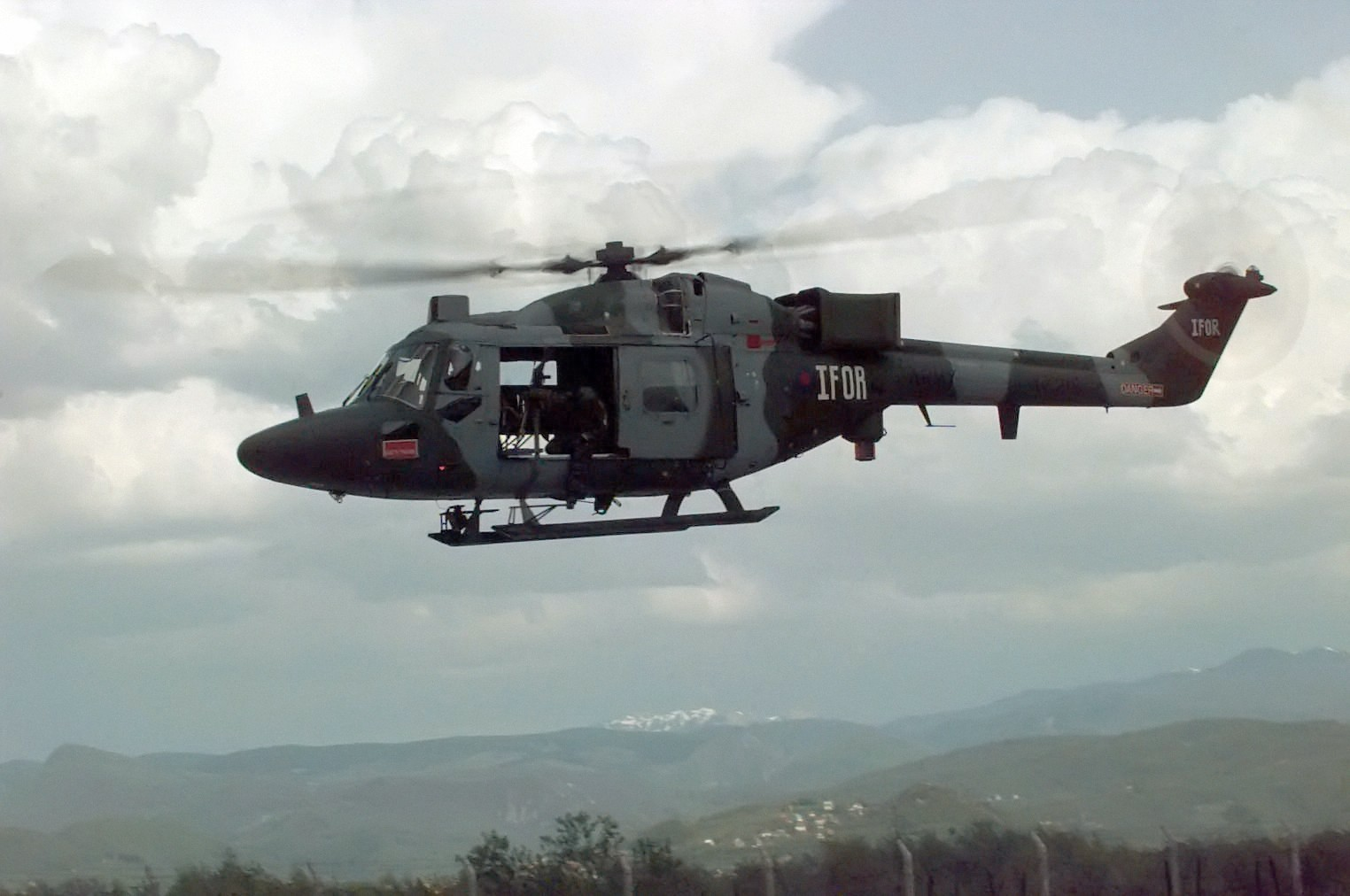
AAC Lynx helicopter used to support the UDR

The standard patrol vehicle was the 3/4 ton Land Rover used extensively throughout the British armed forces. Following withdrawal from police service, a number of Shorland armoured cars were allocated to the regiment. Rarely used after initial service because the turret weapon was a GPMG and deemed unsuitable for urban use due to its rapid rate of fire. The Shorland was not generally popular due to its instability on the road. This was due to the heavy turret. However, some battalions continued to use them into the 1980s in high-risk area because of the increased protection plate armour gave over Makrolon polycarbonate armour fitted to Land Rovers. The tough Shorlands saved the lives of a number of people on patrol.

Units were sometimes deployed by Royal Air Force and Army Air Corps helicopters for rapid insertion or for duties in areas of greatest threat where it was unwise to use "green transport" (wheeled).

==== Boat patrols ====
Several battalions were supplied with rigid Dell Quay Dory craft for patrolling waterways shared with the Republic of Ireland in an attempt to prevent gun-running across these narrow channels such as Carlingford Lough. Assisted by land-based Decca Marine radar mounted on a Land Rover, deployed at Killowen Point. These boats were armed with Bren light machine guns and carried a Carl Gustav 84mm anti-tank weapon in addition to the rifles and sub-machine guns normally carried by soldiers. The shore-based dories proved inadequate and a paper was submitted by 3 UDR in 1972, recommending a naval vessel to be stationed in the centre of Carlingford Lough to assist with the suppression of gun-running. This suggestion was adopted and to the end of the security situation a small warship was on station off the coast of the Warrenpoint/Rostrevor shoreline. This intervention was called Operation Grenada. Gun-running across these coastal estuaries ceased as a result. 3 UDR continued to use dories and radar on stretches of the coast. The radar was withdrawn from use and later dispatched to the south Atlantic during the Falklands War on board the SS Atlantic Conveyor and lost when the ship was sunk after being hit by two Argentine Exocet missiles. The 4th Battalion also carried out waterway patrols on upper and lower Lough Erne.

==== Communications ====
At first there were not enough radios to issue to each patrol and those available were of the PYE "Bantam" type used by the police, which did not have sufficient range. As a result, UDR patrols were issued with pockets of small change to use in telephone boxes in order to effectively report back to base. When radios were issued they were of the type used by the regular army such as Larkspur A41 manpacks, B47 and C42 vehicle mounted sets. Over time these were replaced with Stornophones as vehicle sets with preselected frequencies which operated on the NINET rebroadcast system, working through masts strategically placed on various high points throughout Northern Ireland such as Slieve Croob. Pyephones continued to be used for foot patrols but the range of these sets gradually improved. Each battalion was able to communicate with other battalions using C42's and B47's installed in the battalion or company Operations room (Ops Room) or Communications Centre (Comcen) as well as the BID 150 system of cryptic coding and scrambler telephone system.

==== Dogs ====
Search dogs were originally provided by the regular army but eventually a UDR dog section was formed to provide more immediate assistance in search operations. One of the dog handlers, Corporal Brian David Brown of 3 UDR together with his Labrador dog Oliver was killed in Kilkeel by an IRA bomb in 1986. Cpl Brown was posthumously awarded the Queen's Gallantry Medal.

==== The Yellow Card ====
The Yellow Card

All members of the British Armed Forces, including the UDR, carried a number of small information cards to assist in the execution of their duties in Northern Ireland. These were generally referred to by their colour. The most important of these was the Yellow Card which contained the rules for opening fire.

This content of this information card was seen as vitally important and all soldiers were taught to be entirely familiar with it as it contained specific instructions to be followed when opening fire on a suspected enemy. Requiring, "total understanding and instantaneous recall of the provisions...." Warnings were to be issued to allow suspects to surrender. Soldiers could only shoot without warning "if there is no other way to protect themselves or those whom it is their duty to protect from the danger of being killed or seriously injured." The card was amended in 1980 to carry the words "Firearms must only be used as a last resort". The use of the card was debated in Parliament.

== Personnel ==
=== Training ===
25% of the new recruits in 1970 had no previous military or special constabulary experience. Training was done by a team of regular soldiers attached to each unit headed up by a training major, assisted by former instructors from the armed forces who were recruits themselves.

The annual training commitment for each part-time soldier was twelve days and twelve, two-hour training periods. Part of which included attendance at annual training camp. As an incentive, any soldier who fulfilled his training was given an annual bounty of £25-£35, later increased to £150 for the first year, £250 for the second and £350 for the third and subsequent years. This bounty in modern terms would be worth £1674 per year. Pay was also given for training days but this was less than the rate for operational duty.

As with all British military recruits, training started with an introduction to basic battle skills and the book of the same name, which, where possible, was issued to each individual soldier. Instruction was also given on the Army marksmanship pamphlet Shoot to Kill.

Part-time (and later, permanent cadre) soldiers were required to attend an annual camp for a seven-day period. Camps were located at:

England	Scotland	Northern Ireland
Warcop, Cumbria	Barry Buddon, Angus	Ballykinler, County Down
Lydd and Hythe, Cinque Ports		Magilligan, County Londonderry
Wathgill, North Yorkshire		
Otterburn, Northumberland		
Thetford, Norfolk		

These camps not only provided intensive training but they included days out and social events where soldiers could relax and drop their guard, well away from the troubled areas they normally patrolled.

From 1975 onwards specially trained search teams were created to comb the countryside and derelict buildings for illegal stashes of weapons and explosives. Some of these dumps were booby trapped and particular care and alertness was needed.

Training continued to be done at each battalion's own HQ until 2 July 1979 when the UDR Training Centre opened at the old weekend training camp at Ballykinlar, County Down. The first recruit courses as the centre for permanent cadre troops were four weeks long and the subjects included physical training, foot drill, assault course, range firing, foot and mobile patrol procedures (including vehicle stops), map reading, signals, first aid and a grounding in legal responsibilities. The first recruit course passed out on 28 July 1979 and the salute was taken by Brigadier David Miller, Commander UDR. Courses were not just for permanent cadre and included training for:platoon commanders, platoon sergeants, potential NCOs, skill-at-arms, surveillance, intelligence, photography and search updating.

In 1990 the UDR Training Centre became responsible for all military training in Northern Ireland. Under the command of a regular army lieutenant colonel seconded to the UDR. The centre then ran courses for the regular army and RAF Regiment individual reinforcements on search team training, combat medics, skill-at-arms, and NCO training; as well as the management of the extensive weapon ranges at Ballykinlar.

=== Family ===
In some cases several members of a family would join the same unit. This led to husbands, wives, sons and daughters, even grandparents serving together. Whilst this did create a good esprit de corps there were problems created. Once anyone in a family joined the Ulster Defence Regiment the entire household, even children, had to be educated on personal safety. The hours were long and soldiers had to forfeit a normal family life. On duty too there were issues. Family members had to be split into different patrols and vehicles so that if one unit was attacked an entire family would not run the risk of being killed or wounded at the same time. In 1975 there were eighty four married couples serving and fifty three family groups of three or more.

UDR soldiers lived in their own civilian homes, (except for attached regular army personnel who were given "quarters").

Many lived in Protestant or Catholic enclaves which put them within easy reach of local paramilitary or community groups. The years 1972–73 saw paramilitary threats from loyalist and republican sources. Of the 288 incidents of intimidation reported, all but twelve were from Protestants who had been threatened from within their own community. Sometimes this was to gain information or to persuade soldiers to join (or remain within) loyalist organisations. The intimidation included: threatening letters and phone calls, abduction, shots fired from passing cars and off-duty soldiers being assaulted.

In the early days some even lived in what would later become known as "hard line areas" such as Private Sean Russell of 7 UDR who lived in the New Barnsley Estate in Belfast. This led to many UDR soldiers becoming targets for various paramilitary groups whilst off duty and indeed Sean Russell was subsequently targeted and killed whilst at home, in front of his family.

== Resignation of Catholic soldiers ==
In 1970–71, Catholics made up about 36% of the population and about 18% of the UDR. By the end of 1972 the number of Catholics in the UDR had dropped to 3% and never rose above that figure again. There are a number of reasons for this. In the early years of the conflict, relations soured between the Catholic community and the Army. This was mainly due to incidents such as the Falls Curfew, internment, Bloody Sunday and Operation Motorman. There were also frequent claims of UDR soldiers abusing Catholics at checkpoints and during house searches. Many Catholic soldiers left the regiment due to pressure and intimidation from their own community, and the IRA's policy of singling out Catholic soldiers for assassination. Catholics within the regiment also reported being intimidated by Protestant fellow soldiers. Other Catholics resigned in protest at what they saw as the Army's harsh and biased treatment of their community, especially after Operation Demetrius (the introduction of internment). The Belfast Telegraph reported that 25% of the regiment's Catholics resigned in 1971, half of those in the months following Operation Demetrius. By the end of 1972, the vast majority had resigned or simply stopped turning up for duty.

Senior officers attempted to halt the exodus of Catholics, allowing battalion commanders to appear on television (not usually permitted for the rank of lieutenant colonel in those days). Appeals were made to religious and political leaders and extra personal security measures were introduced. Brigadier Scott-Bowden's successor in 1972 was Brigadier Denis Ormerod, a Catholic whose mother's family came from the Republic of Ireland. His second-in-command (Deputy Commander UDR), Colonel Kevin Hill, was also Catholic, as was his successor Colonel Paddy Ryan. Ormerod admitted in his memoirs that his religion and appointment as the senior Catholic Army officer in Northern Ireland helped him considerably in his rapport with religious leaders of his own faith but that these appointments created unease with Protestants leading to meetings with concerned unionist politicians including, notably, Ian Paisley.

By 1981, less than 2% (160) of serving UDR soldiers were Catholic, the bulk of whom were ex-servicemen and women with the British Army from non-Irish backgrounds. Some were former regular British soldiers who had been deployed in Northern Ireland and later settled there. However, their Catholicism gave them little common ground with the Nationalist/Catholic community in Northern Ireland.

== Operational role ==
Although an integral part of the British Army, the UDR's duties did not require it to be called upon to serve outside Northern Ireland. This type of engagement was subsequently referred to as "Home Service" and was similar to the model adopted by the short-lived Home Service Force raised in the UK in 1982.

The primary function of the regiment was to assist the RUC by "guarding key points and installations, to carry out patrols and to establish check points and road blocks against armed guerrilla-type attacks". Patrols and vehicle checkpoints on public roads were designed to hinder the activities of paramilitary groups and to reassure the law-abiding general public. Writing in 1991, Ken Maginnis recounted that the Regiment had originally been formed as a "sop to Unionism" and it was never intended to have a "serious" operational role, with UDR soldiers at first being assigned to "demeaning" and pointless posts such as guarding water reservoirs.

The first operational deployment of the regiment was by the 2nd and 6th battalions, deploying 400 soldiers in an 8th Infantry Brigade operation along the border with the Irish Republic in Armagh, Tyrone and Fermanagh to intercept the movement of munitions into Northern Ireland. As the force was initially part-time the presence of its soldiers was mostly felt during evenings and weekends. It was expected to answer to general call-outs, and was mobilised on a permanent basis on several occasions such as Operation Motorman to provide assistance to the police and army. As the regiment acquired more full-time soldiers it assumed duties previously assigned to the police or Army in support of Operation Banner. By 1980, the full-time element had matched the numbers of part-timers and the regiment's role had expanded to include tactical responsibility for 85% of Northern Ireland, supporting the Royal Ulster Constabulary.

=== 1974 Ulster Workers Council Strike ===
The first Ulster Workers' Council strike took place between 15 and 28 May 1974. This is arguably the greatest test of integrity and loyalty the UDR had to endure, along with the RUC. The regiment was not called out but 3 UDR, then at annual camp in Magilligan was deployed on Sunday 19 May by road and air to the south Tyrone and south Fermanagh areas usually patrolled by 4 UDR and 6 UDR. Two days previously on 17 May loyalist paramilitaries had carried out a series of bombings in Dublin and Monaghan. The authorities believed the Provisional IRA would retaliate so had provided the 3rd Battalion as reinforcements to the local battalions.

Despite there being no call out UDR soldiers flocked to their bases for duty. They were frustrated in not being able to take any direct action against the strikers but the only orders they got were to "stand back and observe". A patrol from 7 UDR was able to prevent loyalists from throwing stones and bottles at regular troops in the Ballybeen estate in Dundonald. Barricades preventing soldiers from the Newtownabbey company of 10 UDR who lived in Monkstown from getting to their base were lifted when the platoon commander and platoon sergeant went down and warned the people manning the barricades that they would "regret it in the future" if they continued to prevent the UDR from getting out on patrol.

Some soldiers took their turn manning the barricades alongside the UDA. These were men who lived in UDA dominated housing estates and had been threatened. Those soldiers in such areas who did not take a turn on duty were not allowed to get out of the estates to report for duty and had their cars and homes damaged and in some cases they and their wives were refused service in local shops following the strike.

There were two reported instances of loyalists trying to subvert the loyalty of UDR units. One was against an entire company of 3 UDR and one against a platoon from the 8th battalion. Both failed.

Units from 7 UDR took up positions around key points at the shipyards, an oil refinery in Sydenham and an electricity sub station in the Castlereagh hills. Forty drivers were drafted in from 1, 9 and 10 UDR battalions to assist the Royal Corps of Transport. Eventually 10 UDR and regular units forcibly dismantled the barricades in Monkstown.

Prior to the strike some army commanders and the Brigadier UDR had expressed doubts about who the UDR was loyal to and who they would support in the event of such an action by loyalists. Brigadier Baxter later commented: "During the strike the UDR came of age".

=== Ulsterisation ===
During the 1970s, the British government introduced the Ulsterisation policy in Northern Ireland, which called for the disengagement of non-Ulster troops from the region and replacing them with the UDR and RUC. This was done as British policymakers perceived the death of soldiers from Great Britain to be far more consequential in terms of British public opinion than what could be portrayed as "Irish people killing and policing Irish people". The term "Ulsterisation" was coined by the media. The then Assistant Chief Constable of the RUC, Jack Hermon, summed it up when he said, "Ulstermen need to learn to live together and be policed by Ulstermen. If they have to kill, let them kill each other, not English soldiers."

A report commissioned in 1976 recommended:

- An increase in the establishment of the RUC and RUC Reserve
- Creation of RUC "mobile support units"
- An increase in the conrate establishment of the UDR so it could take over from the regular Army
- A 24-hour military presence by the UDR

The scheme was hampered by the shortfall of conrate officers in the UDR who could take on the role of operations officers. It also placed heavier demands upon senior NCO "watchkeepers" in the operations rooms, or and communication centres (comcens).

The main outcome of Ulsterisation was the creation of the "Province Reserve UDR" (PRUDR) whereby each of the 56 available companies would take it in turns to operate anywhere in the province, although in practice this normally meant in South Armagh.

== Women's UDR (Greenfinches) ==
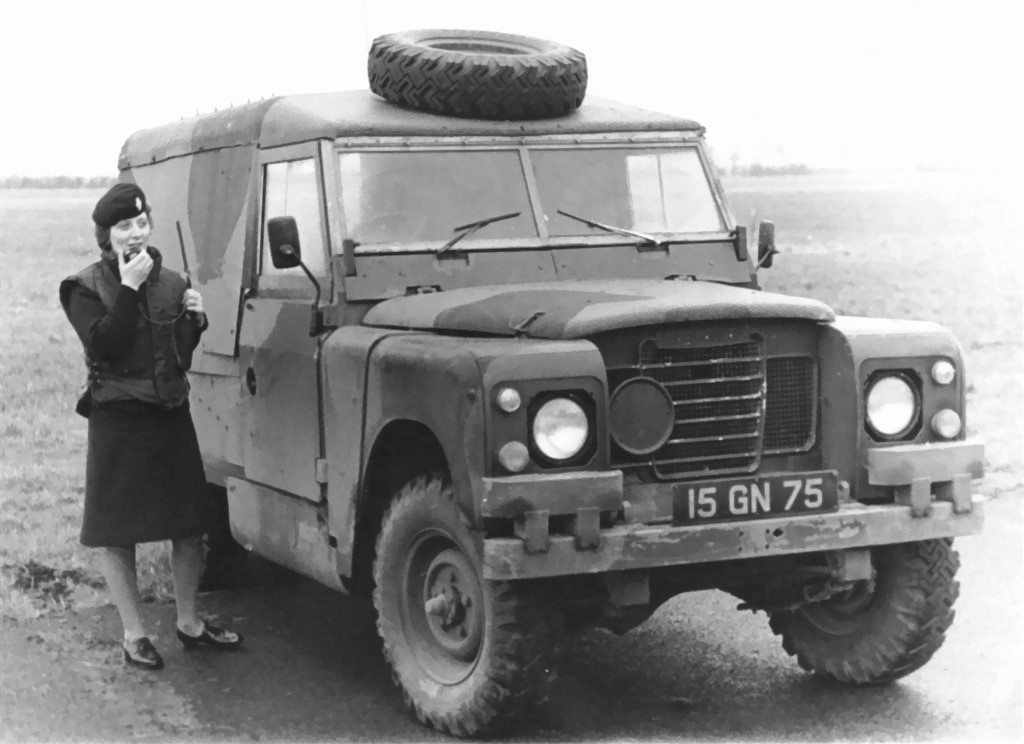
UDR Greenfinch wearing semi-formal skirt and old style "flak Jacket" body armour.

In the early days of the regiment female members of the Royal Military Police accompanied patrols when available to enable female suspects to be searched. There were never enough of these RMP searchers so in 1973 an act was passed in Parliament to recruit women into the regiment. On 16 August 1973 a regular army officer from the Women's Royal Army Corps, Major Eileen Tye, took up the post of "Commander Women" at HQUDR. By September 352 women had been enrolled and the first enlistments were carried out at 2 UDR's HQ in Armagh on the 16th. This use of women as an integrated part of the regiment preceded similar usage in the regular army by 20 years, and paved the way for the disbandment of the Women's Royal Army Corps in 1992.

The only available clothing was mostly ATS surplus from WWII. Many women were unhappy with the semi-formal skirts and knee length boots they had to wear in all weathers. Eventually the regulations were relaxed and by the time of the merger women were wearing full combat uniform. The women soldiers also wore a silk cravat in their battalion colour.

A team of WRAC instructors led by WO2 Brooker was assigned to train the women in a one-week course consisting of drill, army organisation, map reading, searching of women and vehicles, radio procedure and basic first aid. Their assignment finished after one year when Greenfinches with the relevant experience were assigned to take over as instructors.

The first recruits were largely from the executive and professional classes. Some were wives of serving UDR soldiers and others were married to soldiers on long-term (accompanied) posting to Northern Ireland, including the wives of some commanding officers. Some soldiers (male and female) were inclined to settle in Northern Ireland after their time in the army was finished and for female ex-soldiers and the wives of male ex-soldiers being a Greenfinch seemed to be an attractive and familiar career.

The country and border battalions welcomed the use of women as essential in the searching of women and children but the city based battalions were slower to see the advantages and to some extent resented the presence of Greenfinches at first. In the short-term all came to appreciate the value of having females with patrols. Through time the role of women was expanded as it was realised that their higher pitched voices were more suited to radio transmission than men. Tasked to relieve RMP women at the Belfast city centre segment gates they learned how to accept abuse from the public and how to avoid traps that could be set for them while they searched other women; i.e., razor blades placed in pockets.

Some women were trained in the use of "Sea Watch" radar to assist seaborne patrols in those battalions with fast boats.

Initially a part-time female officer was appointed in each battalion to supervise the women soldiers but through time the women came under command of the Officer Commanding (OC) of the company they were assigned to. In later years some women became battalion adjutants or company commanders and a few were attached to brigade staffs throughout Northern Ireland.

Accommodation for changing and toilet facilities was another problem faced early on and it took several years for the all-male environments of UDR bases to adapt to suit female needs.

The name Greenfinch applied to the women's UDR comes from the system of radio "appointment titles" (codewords) used by the army to identify certain people or branches of the service. Male soldiers in the regiment were identified as "Greentop" and women were given the codeword "Greenfinch" with female commanders being referred to as "Goldfinch". This became their working nickname. It is still applied today to women in the Royal Irish Regiment.

The recruitment of women soldiers peaked in 1986 with 286 permanent cadre and 530 part timers but the establishment never dropped below 700 from 1978 onwards.

=== Women's operational role ===
Greenfinches were used to deny terrorists the use of women and children in paramilitary activities. On patrol they were used to search for explosives, weapons, ammunition and documents, as well as driving patrol vehicles, operating radios and acting as interviewers. The use of females in barracks included clerical, catering and store-keeping duties in addition to staffing "Operations Rooms" and "Intelligence Cells", released male soldiers for operational duties.

=== Training ===
Women soldiers were required to pass annual skills tests to qualify for grades and pay increments. If these tests were failed the Greenfinch concerned would be downgraded and suffer a drop in wages. They received regular "role specific" training which included: person and vehicle searching, map reading, first aid, signals, personal security and terrorist recognition; as well as regimental history, military etiquette, rank structure and dress regulations, and also fitness training. They were advised to maintain a high degree of fitness.

Although not armed on duty Greenfinches were trained to fire a full range of weapons and taught how to make a weapon "safe" as part of the training on dealing with casualties. HQUDR ran a .22 shooting competition.

Some Greenfinches were issued with (or purchased) personal protection weapons (PPW's) if considered to be at high risk.

=== Pregnancy, marriage and pay ===
Issues which affected other servicewomen also applied to Greenfinches. Rules regarding pregnancy, marriage, and pay. To join, married women were required to submit written permission from their husbands and those with children were obliged to sign a declaration confirming childcare arrangements.

Ministry of Defence regulations concerning women soldiers meant that Greenfinches would be discharged in the fourth month of pregnancy. If they returned to their unit after maternity leave they were required to retake the basic recruits course. Their previous service did not count towards medal entitlement or promotion. Some sympathetic battalion commanders avoided putting female soldiers through this by sending them on extended, long term leave but keeping them "on strength".

The European Court ruled against the Ministry of Defence in 1990 and awarded compensation to 78 former Greenfinches totaling £370,000. Regulations then changed and all British servicewomen were subsequently allowed 48 weeks unpaid maternity leave, following which they could return to duty without preconditions.

A study in 1988 showed that half the women serving were married and 42% were mothers, with two thirds of their children being infants or of school age.

=== Women casualties ===
Four Greenfinches were killed as active servicewomen between 1974 and 1992. The first was Private Eva Martin, age 28, fatally wounded by rocket fragments on 3 May 1974 during a IRA attack on 6 UDR's outlying base at the Deanery, Clogher. She was also the first female from the security forces to die in the Troubles.

== Opposition forces ==
During the concept stage of the UDR the major armed threat to the state was the Irish Republican Army. Following a split in this organisation the Provisional Irish Republican Army (IRA) was formed in December 1969, just days before recruiting was to begin for the regiment.

The Provisonal IRA became and remained the priority for the UDR, although threats to life and property also existed from other organisations. The Official Irish Republican Army (OIRA) continued to commit acts of violence as did the Irish National Liberation Army (INLA), an OIRA splinter group. Threats to the public peace also came from loyalist organisations such as the Ulster Volunteer Force (UVF), the Ulster Defence Association (UDA) which used the nom de guerre Ulster Freedom Fighters when killing, and a selection of other groupings who emerged during the Troubles. As the IRA campaign continued throughout the 1970s and 1980s, it and other groups increasingly targeted Ulster Defence Regiment soldiers as well as others from the forces of law and order."

Methods of attack included sniping, bombs and other tactics used by guerrilla armies when facing an enemy with superior forces. There were however open actions between the regiment and the IRA, which varied in style and tactics between the urban setting of Belfast and rural areas.

There were few conventional attacks, but notably, on 2 May 1974, up to forty IRA men attacked the isolated 6 UDR Deanery base at Clogher, County Tyrone. A sustained assault lasted for around twenty minutes, during which it was hit by rockets, mortars, and small-arms fire. F/Private Eva Martin was fatally wounded during this attack, the first female UDR soldier to be killed by enemy action.

The IRA developed home-made mortars referred to as barrack busters. Normally fixed to the back of a commercial vehicle such as a builder's lorry, the vehicle would be parked in position near a barracks and the devices fired by timing device or remote controlled sending missiles made from gas cylinders into the barracks compound. The largest of these was 12 tubes fired at 3 UDR's Kilkeel base "The Abbey" in 1992. Bases were also attacked in other ways such as the truck bomb which destroyed 2 UDR's Glenanne Barracks killing three soldiers and wounding many more.

Some mortars could also be fired horizontally. The first recorded use of this weapon was against a mobile patrol from 2 UDR on 1 March 1991. Two soldiers died. The funeral of one, Private Paul Sutcliffe, an Englishman, was held in Barrowford, Lancashire – the only UDR funeral to be held outside Northern Ireland. The second casualty, Private Roger Love, from Portadown died after three days.

On 8 November 1987 the Provisional IRA bombed the cenotaph at Enniskillen in what became known as the Remembrance Day bombing. 200 UDR soldiers were about to march onto the square beside the memorial when the bomb exploded.

Because the UDR did not live in barracks like other soldiers but lived at home (in many cases with families), they were vulnerable to attack when off-duty. A number of soldiers were issued with personal weapons. Some of these were stolen from soldiers homes. Part-time soldiers were most at risk as they had day jobs which often took them to unsafe areas. Most UDR soldiers killed in the Troubles were attacked off-duty.

Forty-seven former soldiers were killed after leaving the UDR. Others, especially in the Fermanagh border area, were forced to move to safer areas, had to sell their homes and, sometimes, their land as a result of imminent threat.

In February 2010 "about a dozen" former UDR soldiers in Mid-Ulster were warned by the PSNI that they were under threat from dissident Republicans.

== Casualties ==
Between 1 April 1970 and 30 June 1992, a total of 197 soldiers were killed as active servicemen. Another 61 were killed after they had left the UDR. Three members of the UVF and one UDA member killed during the conflict were also soldiers of the regiment at the time of their deaths.

Two UDR soldiers were killed by the regular army, three by loyalist paramilitaries, and the remaining 192 by republican paramilitaries (mainly the Provisional IRA). 22 died "by their own hand" and 220 died of natural causes, mostly heart attack. Four Greenfinches were killed during the Troubles, Private Eva Martin, L/Cpl Jean Leggett, Cpl Heather Kerrigan and Pte Margaret A. Hearst.

During this time soldiers of the UDR were responsible for the killing of six civilians and two members of the IRA.

The first UDR soldier to be killed was Private Winston Donnell, aged 22, from the Strabane Company of 6 UDR, who was killed in action on 9 August 1971 at a vehicle checkpoint (as part of the internment call-out) close to the Clady Bridge border crossing.

The first serving Catholic to be killed was 32-year-old part-time Private Sean Russell of 7 UDR, who was shot dead on 8 December 1971, in front of his wife and children, by members of the Irish Republican Army who burst into his home in the predominantly Catholic area of New Barnsley, Belfast. The last was part-time Private William Megrath of 11 UDR who was shot dead in July 1987 as he drove through the Twinbrook area of west Belfast on his way home from his civilian job.

The last UDR soldier to be killed was L/Cpl Ken Newell of 4/6 UDR who was kidnapped and shot on 26 November 1991 in South Armagh. Another soldier kidnapped with him was set free near Crossmaglen not far from where Cpl Newell's body was found.

Attacks did not stop after amalgamation. Six soldiers who had served with the UDR were killed on active duty with the Royal Irish Regiment (Home Service Battalions).

== Paramilitary infiltration of the UDR ==
Members of extremist groupings managed to join the UDR despite the vetting process. Their purpose in doing so was to obtain weapons, training and intelligence. BY 1976 approximately 315 weapons had been stolen with many more taken from UDR members' homes. Several stolen weapons were used in the commission of sectarian killings, attempted killings and robberies.

Vetting procedures were carried out jointly by Army Intelligence and the RUC's Special Branch and if no intelligence was found to suggest unsuitability individuals were passed for recruitment and would remain as soldiers until the commanding officer was provided with intelligence enabling him to remove soldiers with paramilitary links or sympathies.

18 UDR soldiers were convicted of murder and 11 for manslaughter. Between 1970 and 1985, 99 were convicted of assault, whilst others were convicted of armed robbery, weapons offences, bombing, intimidation and attacks on Catholics, kidnapping, and membership of the UVF. Only a small proportion of the 40,000 individuals who served with the regiment were convicted of criminal activities, but the proportion was higher than for the regular British Army or RUC.

=== Loyalist infiltration ===
When the regiment was formed, the UDA did not yet exist; it would not be established until September 1971. Dual membership was initially acceptable to the military authorities as the UDA was not seen as a threat to the state. This changed when on 29 November 1972, the GOCNI, on instructions from Westminster, announced that dual membership of UDR and paramilitary organisations would not be tolerated and began a purge which saw 171 soldiers with links to the UDA discharged by the end of 1975. Lt Col Dion Beard (1RTR) commander of 3 UDR issued a battalion order:

I will not tolerate any active participation by members of this battalion in any organisation which encourages violence... you cannot play in both teams. Either you believe in law and order applied equally to all men, or you believe in violence as a means of achieving political ends. In this respect the UDA is no better than IRA. Not only should you take no part in UDA activities but you should discourage your fellow citizens [from doing so].

A similar statement was issued by the commanding officer of 11 UDR when Ian Paisley's Third Force was established in 1981. The media reported that he had issued a battalion order to the effect that any soldier who became involved in the Third Force would be dismissed.

During the regiment's 22-year history, loyalist raids were mounted against 3 UDR, 5 UDR, 7 UDR, 10 UDR, and 11 UDR. Subsequent to a raid against 11 UDR's C company, Lurgan on 20 October 1972, the guard commander, Sgt. Billy Hanna MM, was convicted of supplying arms and information to loyalist paramilitaries. Most were recovered in follow up operations, but some were later proven to have been used by loyalist organisations to carry out crimes, including murders. Most stolen weapons were taken by loyalist organisations, but a number of soldiers were killed by members of the IRA who attacked their homes to steal rifles.

Two soldiers from the 11 UDR's C Company (also UVF members) were convicted of the 1975 killing of three musicians from The Miami Showband. This attack was led by Robin Jackson, a former UDR soldier who had been discharged for "undisclosed reasons". Two soldiers from 11 UDR's E Company, Portadown (also UVF members), died in the premature explosion of their own bomb.

In 1977, the Army investigated D and G companies of 10 UDR based at Girdwood Barracks, Belfast. The investigation concluded that 70 soldiers had "links" to the UVF. Following this two were dismissed on security grounds. 30 NCOs from D Company were suspected of fraudulently "siphoning off" between £30,000 - £47,000. A large percentage of this was suspected of going to the UVF. It was also alleged that UVF members socialized with soldiers in their mess. The investigation was halted after a senior UDR officer claimed it was harming morale. Details of the investigation were discovered in 2011.

In 1989, twenty-eight UDR soldiers were arrested as part of the Stevens Inquiries into alleged collusion with loyalist paramilitaries. Twenty-six belonged to the same company of 7/10 UDR. Six were later awarded damages. One was charged with activities linked to loyalist paramilitaries. The Stephens team caused "intense anger" as three hundred police had been used to surround the homes of suspects. This had identified them as UDR soldiers to their neighbours, potentially putting their lives at risk. Eleven moved house as a result, while the homes of eighteen others were provided with "additional security measures" at a cost of £25,000.

In 1999, David Jordan, a former UDR soldier, allegedly broke down in a bar and admitted to being part of a patrol that killed nationalist Councillor Patsy Kelly in 1974.

=== Republican infiltration ===
On 5 December 1972 William Bogle of 6 UDR was ambushed and killed at Killeter near the Tyrone/Donegal border. It was alleged that he was targeted by a former member of his own company "possessed of strong republican views" who moved across the border after the killing and is not known to have returned to Northern Ireland.

=== Measures against infiltration ===
- The Bray reforms

Brigadier Michael Bray adopted a zero-tolerance policy for any activity related to loyalism from the beginning of his tenure as Commander UDR. He instituted a number of safeguards including monitoring of entire battalions and six-month security reviews of all UDR personnel. An out of bounds list was compiled which included pubs and clubs known to be frequented by loyalist paramilitaries. Soldiers were cautioned as to whom they should socialise with. This was a concerted effort to remove anyone with dual membership from the regiment and to prevent peer pressure being applied.

- The Stevens Enquiry

The Stevens Report resulted in a tightening of control on even the most low-rated intelligence documents and heightened accountability. For the first time the RUC were given access to UDR vetting procedures and many soldiers found themselves under police observation for extended periods of time, in some cases resulting in their discharge. Stevens agreed there had been collusion between a small number of UDR soldiers who had "gravely abused their positions of trust" but that the issue was not "widespread or institutionalised".

=== The 1973 "Subversion in the UDR" report ===
A draft document, entitled Subversion in the UDR, was amongst many released in 2005 and discovered in the Public Record Office. Some content appeared in The Irish News on 2 and 3 May 2006. Believed to have been prepared by British military intelligence in August 1973, it examines the issue of overlapping membership between the UDR and subversive organisations in the first three years of recruiting. Subversion was considered to be a "strong support for, or membership of, organisations whose aims are incompatible with those of the UDR" and attempts by soldiers to use their "knowledge, skills, or equipment to further the aims of such organisations." It speculated that "perhaps" 5–15% of UDR soldiers were, or had been, full members of "Protestant extremist groups". That the "best single source of weapons, and the only significant source of modern weapons, for these groups was the UDR" and that the British government knew UDR weapons were being used by loyalist paramilitaries, including the killing of a Catholic civilian and other attacks. The report admitted that there existed scarce intelligence on the full extent of infiltration of the UDR by loyalist paramilitaries:

We know comparatively little, from an intelligence point of view, of subversion in the UDR. Often what intelligence there is, is of a 'post facto' character. But despite our limited sources and the limited evidence available to us a fair number of UDR soldiers have been discovered to hold positions in the UDA/UVF. A number have been involved in overt terrorist acts. It is most unlikely that our intelligence coverage presents anything like the whole picture of infiltration of the UDR by the UDA and other groups, and there is no immediate prospect of it doing so.

The report illustrated how over 200 UDR weapons were lost or stolen by the end of 1972, although the rate of loss had decreased to 56 by 1973 when the report was written. This was suggested to be partially due to increased security and also that "the reduced credibility of Protestant extremist groups in the eyes of the majority community, has made the subversion of UDR members more difficult." During 1973 the most successful loyalist extremist arms raids took place at the Department of Industrial and Forensic Science, and at firearms dealers in Belfast, Newtownards and Armagh, rather than on UDR locations. The report suggested there was no substantial threat of subversion from republican extremists in the regiment as the number of Catholics had decreased to under 4%. There were isolated incidents where Catholic UDR soldiers 'lost' weapons in suspicious circumstances, but "neither the number of weapons nor the threat is thought to be great".

The report concluded that except in limited circumstances subversion in the UDR has not compromised its ability to carry out its duties. This was caveated with the caution that there were "predictable political circumstances" in which the UDR might not only experience a much "higher level" of subversion than at the time of the report, but in which "elements" of the UDR might "cease to be reliable." One such scenario considered was after the failure of political initiatives, unionist politicians might attempt to declare a unilateral declaration of independence for Northern Ireland to return power to the unionist community.

== Political controversy ==
Protest poster against the UDR

The Ulster Defence Regiment commanded uncritically fierce support from most Protestants in Northern Ireland but never gained the confidence of the Roman Catholic minority. This can partially be explained by the failure to attract and retain Catholics, and partially by the sectarian culture and character of the regiment, which became explicit following the introduction of internment without trial of suspected Irish Republicans after 1971.

Initially, the Nationalist political parties at Stormont encouraged Catholics to join. The first notable change to this was caused by the Parliament of Northern Ireland's decision to introduce internment. None of those initially interned were Protestant, which led Catholics to understand that this was a measure directed entirely against their community. For the UDR it meant an increase in Republican propaganda against the regiment. After the introduction of internment, Catholic support for the regiment plummeted and the few Catholic soldiers that remained faced intimidation from their own communities.

Incidents where British troops killed Catholic civilians, such as the Ballymurphy and Bloody Sunday massacres (which occurred in August 1971 and January 1972 respectively) also served to convince Catholics that the UDR was a sectarian force. In 1971, 25% of the UDR's Catholic soldiers chose to be discharged from the regiment. During 1972, another 108 Catholic soldiers chose to be discharged.

The Social Democratic and Labour Party (SDLP)'s Ivan Cooper said in a 1972 statement that the regiment "should be disbanded". The Alliance Party's chairman Oliver Napier expressed concern about "undesirables" in the regiment in a statement in November 1972.

The SDLP called for full disbandment of the regiment as early as 1974 through the media and by applying pressure through the Irish government and became the major conduit for complaints against the UDR from Catholics. The SDLP remained opposed to the regiment and continually called for its disbandment "due to the failure of the GOC to address the issue of Catholic recruiting and the regimental image". Although no official support was evident from the party leaderships various members (for example Seamus Mallon), condemned the killing of UDR soldiers and attended funerals, such as in the case of James Cochrane, a Catholic soldier from 3 UDR in Downpatrick who was killed in a culvert bomb attack on 6 January 1980.

After the Hillsborough Agreement the Democratic Unionist Party (DUP) began a campaign with the apparent motive of reducing morale in the regiment and causing mass resignations by undermining the confidence of soldiers in their officers. During this period Ian Paisley announced to the press that soldiers in Ballymena had been requested to report to barracks to be disarmed prior to the part-time cadre being disbanded. The DUP press office claimed that the use of English officers and senior NCOs was "London and Dublin insisting the UDR could not be trusted". and Peter Robinson, the deputy DUP Leader, advised soldiers not to co-operate with policemen who were attached to their patrols as they were there on the directions of the Anglo-Irish Council.

A military assessment in 1981 had concluded there was no long-term requirement for the UDR except for possibly a role in home defence. Any British government doubts about the future viability of the regiment were kept secret for fear of provoking a Unionist backlash and prompting the formation of new Unionist paramilitary groups. Ulster Unionist MP Ken Maginnis interviewed for a BBC Panorama documentary in 1990 opined that disbanding the UDR would lead an increase in Loyalist paramilitary activity and the setting up of other paramilitary organisations.

The UDR's sectarian image received corroboration from an unlikely source in February 1985 when Ulster Unionist leader James Molyneaux privately informed a Northern Ireland Office official of his "concern about the way in which some UDR patrols abused their position in relation to members of the Catholic community".

The weekly republican newspaper An Phoblacht carried reports highlighting what it saw as naked state oppression. In its editorials An Phoblacht referred to the UDR as, "not Dad's Army but a sectarian militia". To help emphasise their message they produced posters which supporters pasted over walls in Republican areas such as "The Loyalist Murderers" and "Blood Money," referring to the redundancy payments received by former UDR soldiers still serving with the Royal Irish Regiment at the end of Operation Banner (the official army title for operations in Northern Ireland). An Phoblacht claimed that the UDR had secret "death squads" sponsored by United Kingdom Special Forces and that members of the UDR (in collusion with British Intelligence) were behind the Dublin and Monaghan bombings.

Journalist Ed Moloney, author of several books on The Troubles, described the UDR as a "largely Protestant militia".

== Music ==
Each battalion had a number of pipers who also participated in a centralised pipe band formally called the Pipes & Drums of the Ulster Defence Regiment. Its uniform followed the traditional military dress for Irish pipers, consisting of a saffron kilt, bottle-green "Prince Charlie" jacket, bottle-green cape and bottle-green caubeen adorned with a double-size cap badge. Unlike other Irish regiments in the British Army, UDR pipers did not wear a hackle and the lining colour of the cloaks was unique to the regiment.

In June 1986, the regiment held its only tattoo which ran over a period of two days in good weather at Ravenhill rugby ground, Belfast. Some of the attractions for the 12,000 people who attended were:

- the Red Devils parachute team;
- Greenfinches abseiling from the top of one of the grandstands;
- UDR dogs;
- a mock ambush;
- Beating Retreat with the Pipes & Drums of the UDR plus the bands of the Duke of Edinburgh's Royal Regiment and the RUC.

The crowd is reported to have created a "deeply moving" moment by humming the evening hymn "The Day Thou Givest". At the end of the performance Brigadier Roger Preston and his wife were piped out of the arena on their way to retirement. Only one UDR Pipes & Drums recording was publicly released: the 5 UDR Pipes & Drums "Irish & Scottish Pipe Music", which includes recordings of the regimental and battalion marches as well as other songs.

== Options for Change and amalgamation ==
After the fall of the Berlin Wall the United Kingdom began to reduce the size of its armed forced under the working title of Options for Change. Army strength was to be reduced from 160,000 to 110,000; the infantry to reduce from 55 battalions to 38. The GOC saw this as a perfect opportunity to streamline the UDR and also remove some of the more "intractable problems" with regards to image and career prospects. In a revolutionary plan he decided to merge the UDR with the Royal Irish Rangers; incorporating part-time soldiers into the regular army for the first time in history. The hope of the British Army's commander was that the process of amalgamation with the Rangers, coupled with the change of name, would be a fresh start for what he says was a "discredited UDR". The Rangers recruited from the South of Ireland, including many Catholics, and this would aid the process.

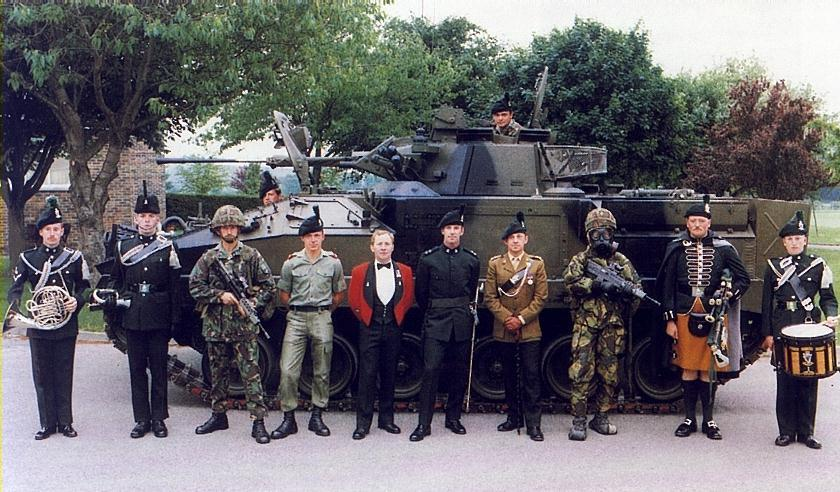
The Royal Irish Rangers in various forms of dress.

"Project Infancy" would also ensure that the Royal Irish Rangers, the last Irish infantry battalion of "the line" did not lose their training facilities and presence in Northern Ireland. The UDR, which was not regular line infantry was, in the words of one commander, "like a fish without feathers". Incorporation as infantry of the line might provide UDR officers with career prospects which mirrored those of the regular army and hopefully resolve the problem of recruiting junior officers. To the GOC the prospect of having a larger number of Catholic officers and NCOs in the UDR would dampen much of the political furore surrounding the regiment. In a private memo to John MacGregor, Lord President of the Council in First Major ministry, then Defence Secretary Tom King emphasised that the merger was primarily motivated by the political controversy surrounding the UDR locally and in Anglo-Irish relations, and it was hoped the move would do away with the UDR's "sectarian stigma."

The plan was approved by early summer 1991 and proposed:

- The 2 battalions of the Royal Irish Rangers would amalgamate to create a single "General Service" battalion.
- The existing nine UDR battalions would be reduced to seven and designated "Home Service".
- The part-time element would remain in the Home Service element but the new structure provided for general reduction when the time was right.
- The new regiment would be called the Royal Irish Regiment, reusing a name which had been lost on the disbandment of many famous Irish infantry regiments after partition in 1922.

In return the UDR would receive:

- A royal title.
- A direct line of succession through the regimental name to the Battle of the Boyne and other battles of the Williamite Wars.

The proposals were generally welcomed at senior level but there was predictable worry amongst the ranks that this was a precursor to disbandment. Unionist political parties protested, particularly the DUP who immediately relaunched their 1989 "Hands Off the UDR" campaign.

When it merged in 1992 the UDR had been on active service longer than any regiment since the Napoleonic Wars, having remained on operations from the day it was created to the day it was amalgamated.

== Awards, honours and decorations ==
The most notable award to the Ulster Defence Regiment was the Conspicuous Gallantry Cross made by The Queen on 6 October 2006. The unit citation confers the right of the regiment to be known as "The Ulster Defence Regiment CGC". During the award ceremony in Belfast the Queen paid tribute to the regiment:

"Your contribution to peace and stability in Northern Ireland is unique." "Serving and living within the community had required "uncommon courage and conviction". "The regiment had never flinched despite suffering extreme personal intimidation. Their successes had "come at a terrible price, many gave their lives. Today you have cause to reflect on the fine achievements, while remembering the suffering". "The Home Service Battalions of the RIR and the UDR which had preceded them won the deepest respect throughout the land." So that their actions would always be remembered, the CGC was awarded to the RIR/UDR "as a mark of the nation's esteem" with the citation, "This award is in recognition of the continuous operational service and sacrifice of the Ulster Defence Regiment and the Royal Irish Regiment in Northern Ireland during Operation Banner."

In total 953 individuals received awards through the British honours system including: 12 Queen's Gallantry Medals; 2 Military Medals; 88 BEMs; 108 OBEs and 276 Mentions in Despatches, however for most UDR soldiers the presentation of decorations assumed the form of "service" or "campaign" medals including:

- The General Service Medal with "Northern Ireland" bar. (Awarded after 28 days service in the Operation Banner campaign)
- The Ulster Defence Regiment Medal
- Northern Ireland Home Service Medal
- The Accumulated Campaign Service Medal (Awarded after 1,000 operational (not training) days service in the campaign)
- The Medal for Long Service and Good Conduct (Ulster Defence Regiment)

The award of "UDR specific" long service medals had complex rules which meant that not very many were ever issued. The UDR medal was only issued to 1,254 of the 40,000 who served. Only 1,416 Accumulated Campaign Service medals were issued.

Officers who are awarded the Ulster Defence Regiment medal may use the post-nominal letters UD.

The most decorated UDR soldier was Corporal Eric Glass of 4 UDR who received both the Queen's Gallantry Medal and Distinguished Conduct Medal for bravery. Despite being gravely injured in an IRA ambush Glass managed to survive, killing one of his attackers, Joseph McManus in the process. An account of this (second) attack on Corporal Glass was carried in the Belfast News Letter.

In 1987, the regiment submitted a request for the issuing of colours to the Queen which was given consent. This was granted in 1991, when the Queen decided to present the colours herself: an honour which is normally reserved only for those regiments of which she is Colonel in Chief.

- 29 June 1991 – The first colours were presented by the Queen to five battalions at Thiepval Barracks, Lisburn.
- November 1991 – 6 UDR was presented at St Lucia Barracks, Omagh by the Duke of Abercorn.
- April 1992 – The last colours were presented by the Duke of York in a ceremony near Edinburgh in April 1992, to 2/11 UDR, 7/10 UDR and 8UDR.

Up to May 2010, 232 Elizabeth Crosses and Memorial Scrolls have been issued to the families of UDR personnel whose deaths are officially attributed to their military service.

Medals of the Ulster Defence Regiment

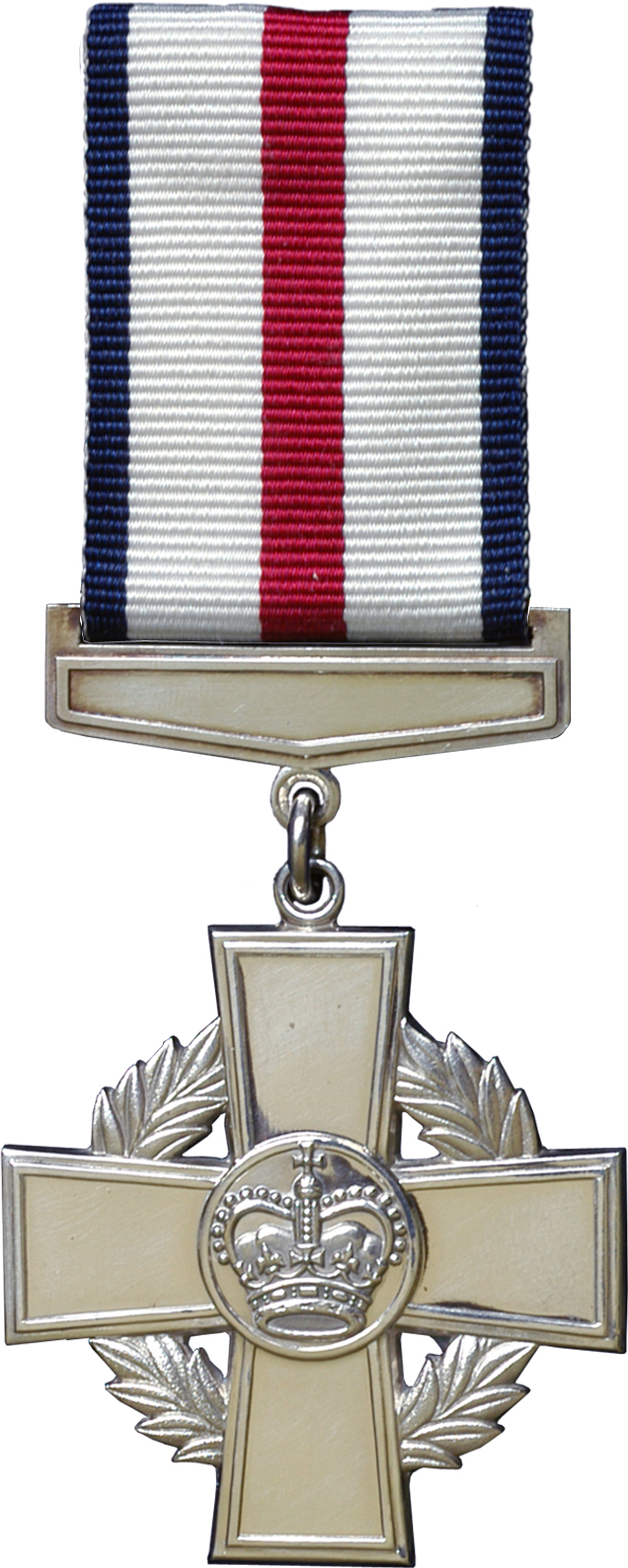
The Conspicuous Gallantry Cross

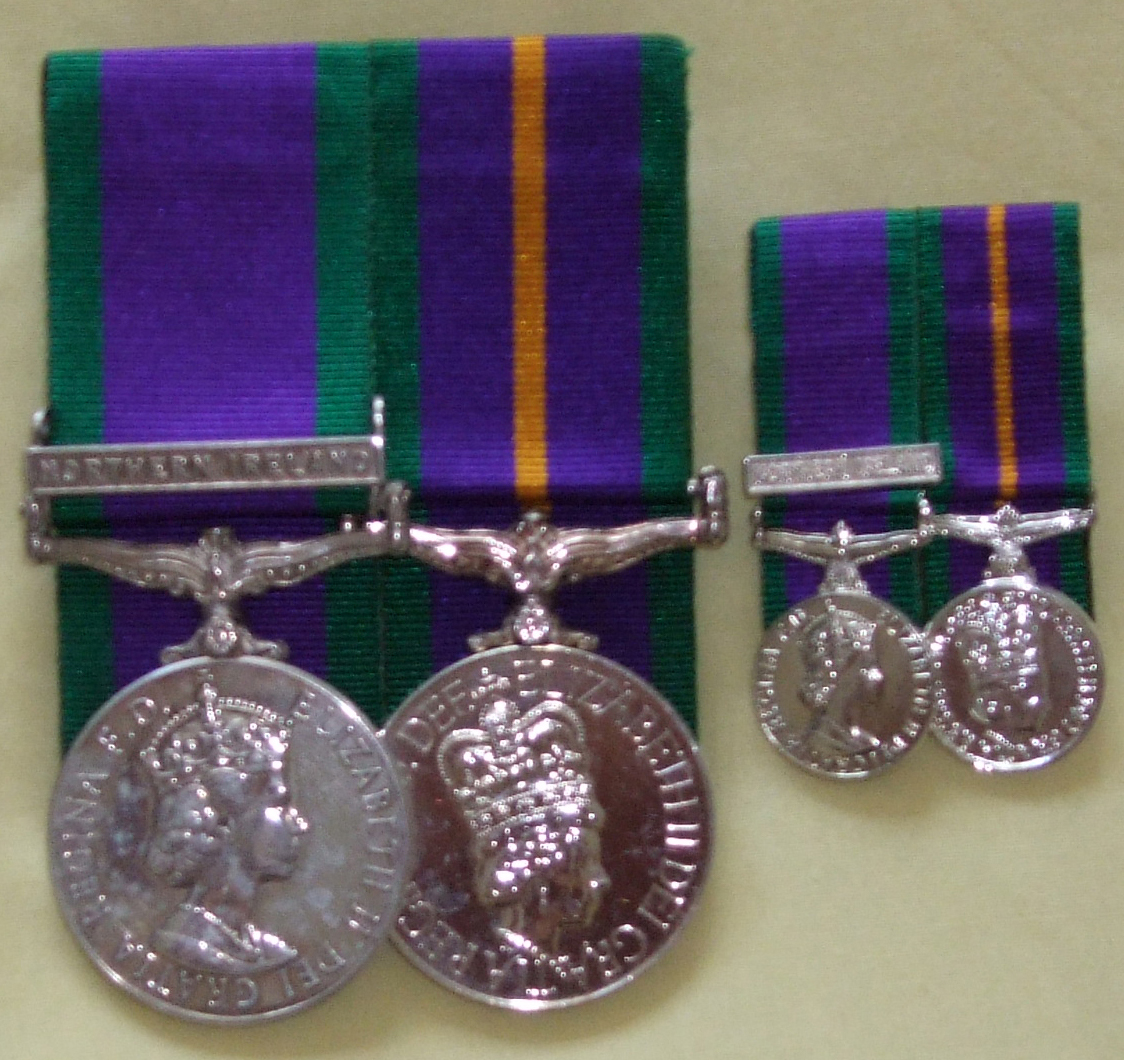
Medal group of the GSM and ACSM plus dress miniatures.

UDR Medal ribbon

UDR Long Service and Good Conduct Medal ribbon

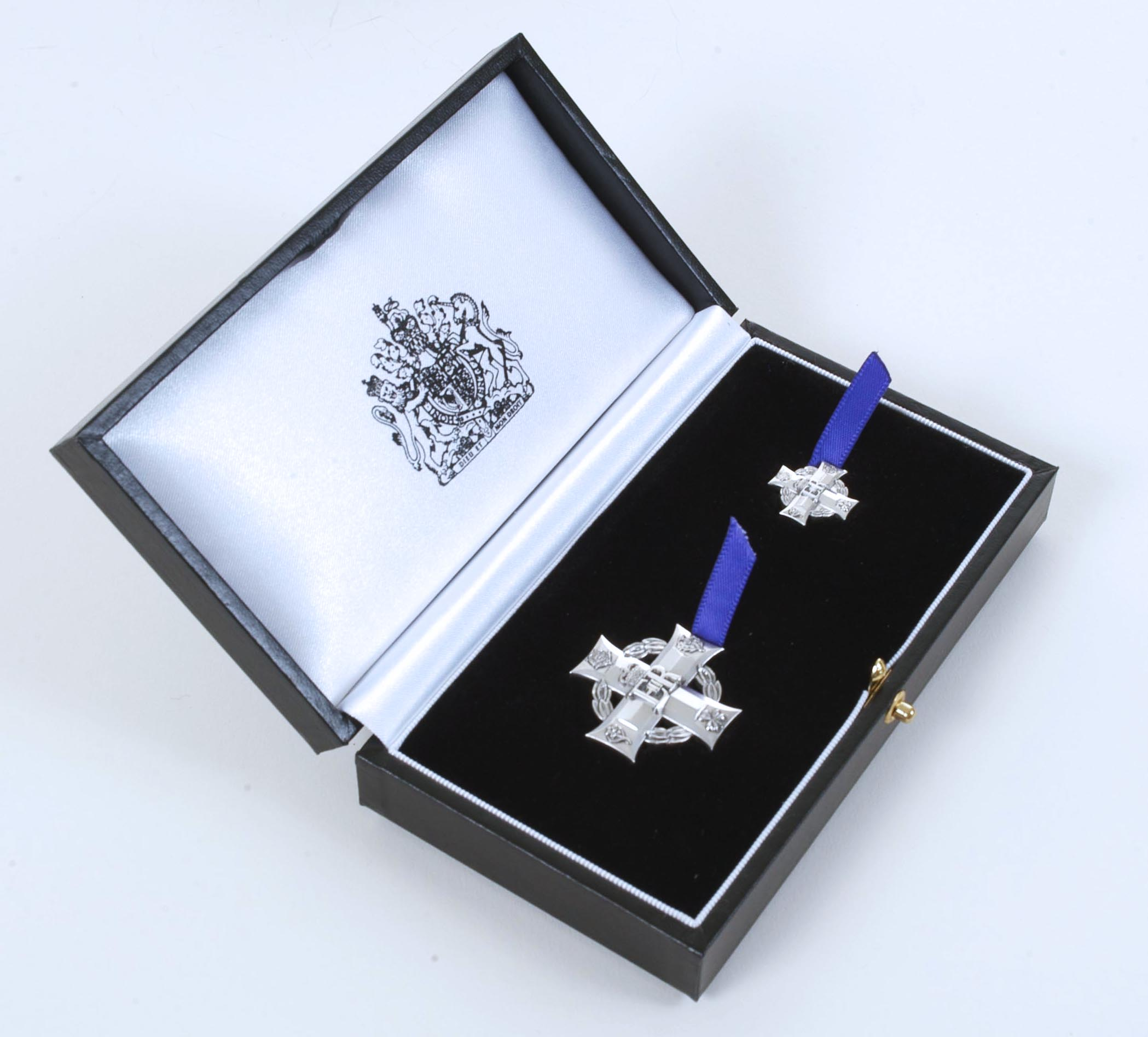
The Elizabeth Cross and dress miniature in presentation case

=== Freedoms ===
The City of Belfast and a number of boroughs throughout Northern Ireland paid their own tribute to the regiment by granting freedoms including: North Down, Larne, and Newtownards.

=== Wilkinson Sword of Peace ===
The community relations work of 7th/10th (City of Belfast) Battalion was recognised by the award of the Wilkinson Sword of Peace for 1990.

== UDR Memorials ==
=== The UDR Memorial, Lisburn ===
A memorial to the UDR was erected in Lisburn, to "recognise the self sacrifice of the soldiers, both men and women, from all traditions of the UK". The Memorial is "a 19-foot 'heroic scale' bronze sculpture" featuring "bronze figures of a male UDR soldier and a female 'Greenfinch' on operational duty...set upon an equally impressive Mourne granite plinth.".

Lisburn City Council leased the site to the UDR Memorial Trust at Market Square, Lisburn. Under the terms of the lease, the UDR Memorial Trust are permitted to use this for the erection of a memorial. The planning, erection and maintenance of the memorial is the responsibility of the UDR Memorial Trust.

The UDR Memorial is in addition to the UDR Roll of Honour situated beside Lisburn War Memorial, Castle Street, Lisburn that commemorates UDR personnel from the Lisburn area who died in the conflict.

The memorial group of statues was unveiled on 12 June 2011 by Viscount Brookeborough, one of the trustees of the UDR Memorial Trust. At the ceremony, Trust chairman Wesley Duncan said, "It was unfortunate that there were members who did bad things and we're not trying to hide that. But what we would say is that there's almost 50,000 people who didn't do bad things – who did good things, who were ordinary decent people who wanted to do the best they could for their country."

=== National Arboretum ===
On Saturday, 28 April 2012 a memorial to the UDR was unveiled at the National Memorial Arboretum by Colonel Sir Dennis Faulkner CBE (Patron of the Regimental Association) along with Memorial Trees in memory of those UDR Soldiers who were murdered after having left the Regiment. Memorial Trees in memory of all those who were killed while serving had already been planted some years ago. The memorial takes the form of a 6-foot Mourne granite monument. The event was attended by around 100 UDR families, joined by the Northern Ireland Minister of State, Hugo Swire, DUP Junior Minister Jonathan Bell and UUP deputy leader John McCallister. A parade to the monument was led by the band of the 1st Battalion Royal Irish Regiment.

A selection of the memorials to the fallen of the UDR found in churches, High Streets and memorial gardens in Northern Ireland and England.

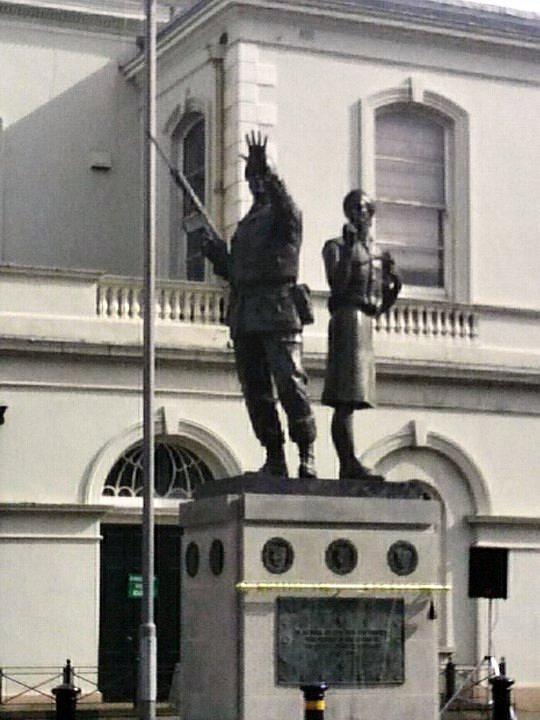
UDR Memorial Statue, Lisburn, June 2011

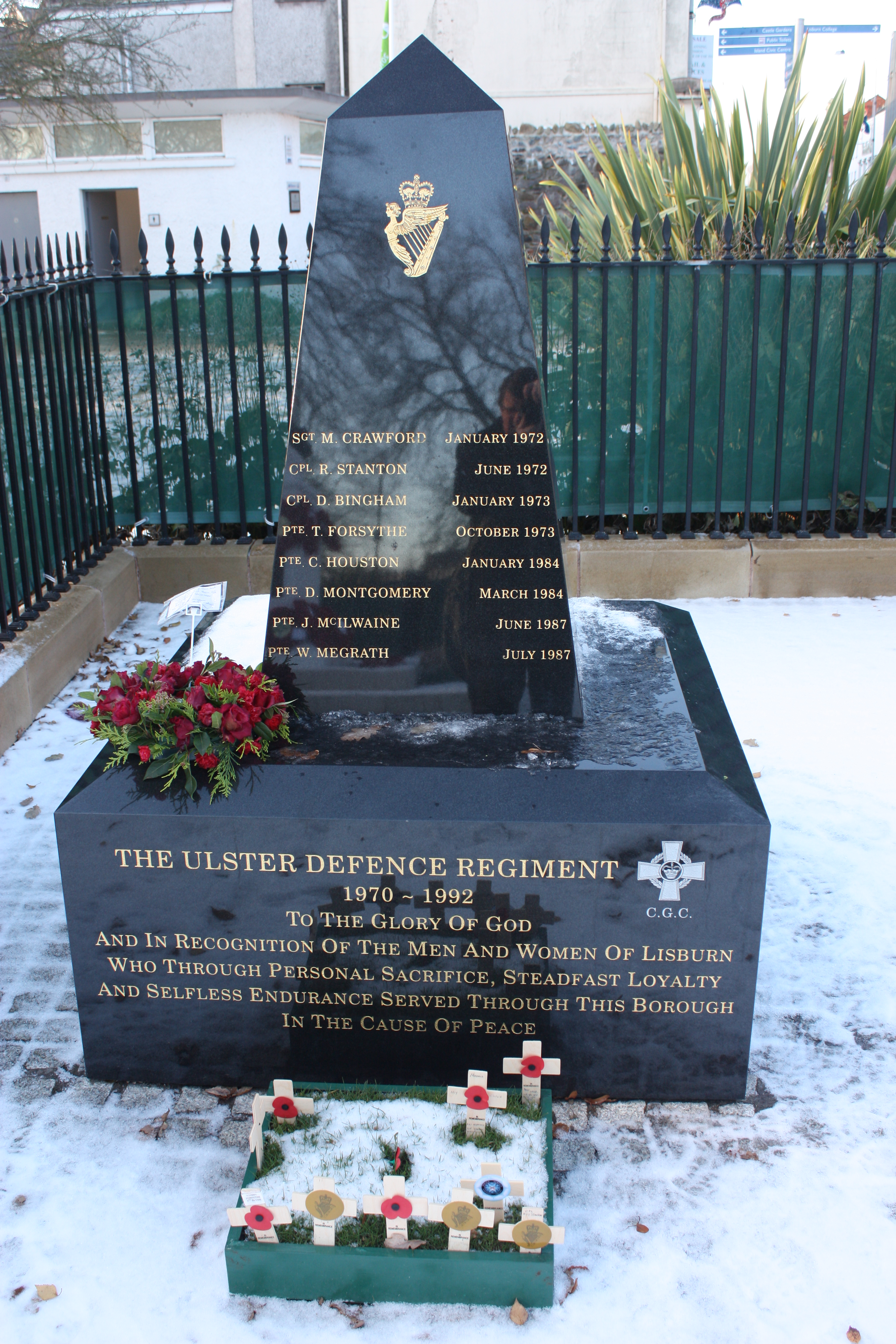
Roll of Honour Memorial, War Memorial, Lisburn.

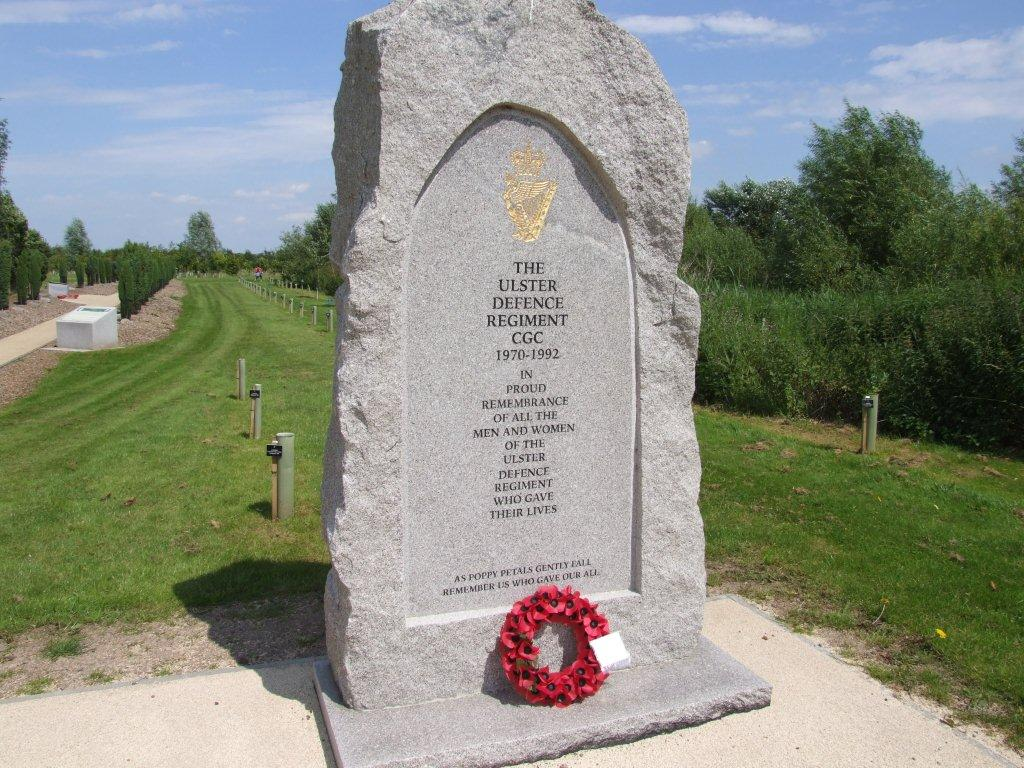
UDR Memorial at the National Arboretum.

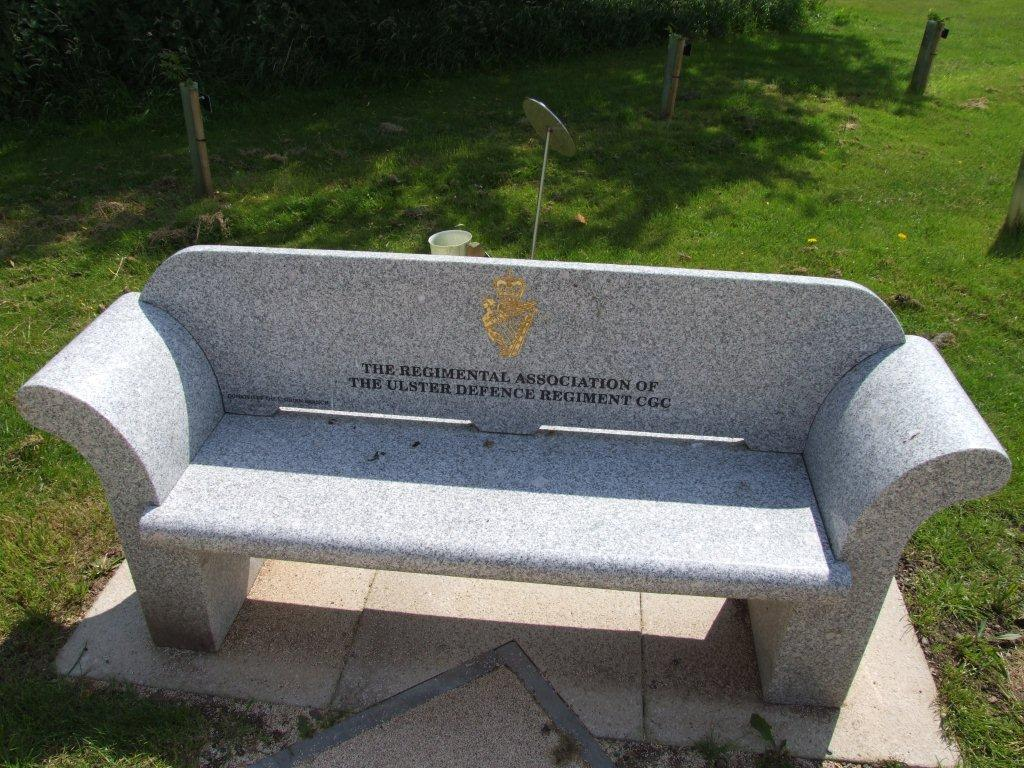
Memorial seat at the National Arboretum.

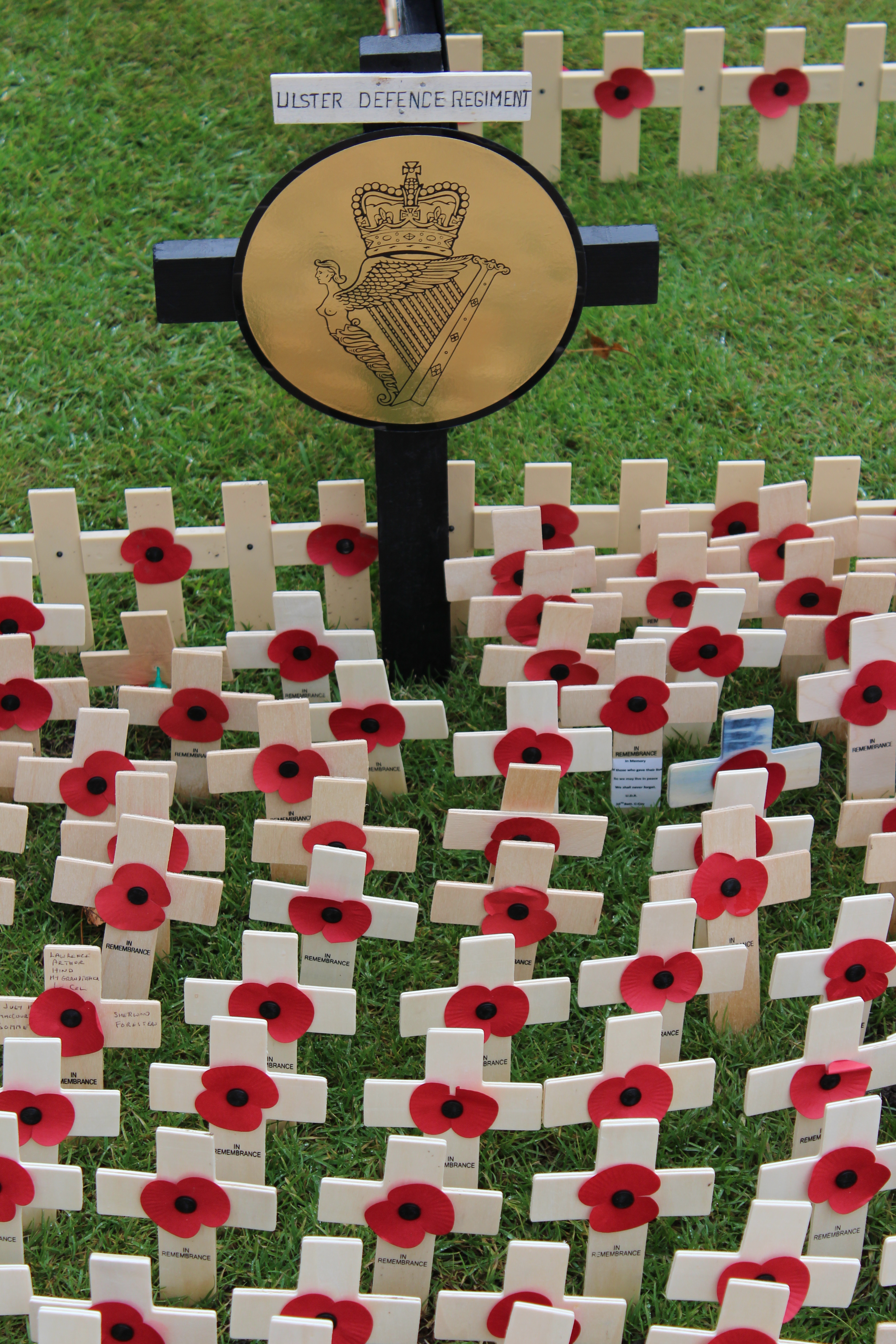
Poppy crosses for the fallen, Belfast Cenotaph.

== Commanders of the UDR ==
(Also known by the title "Brigadier UDR")

- Brigadier Logan Scott-Bowden CBE DSO MC and Bar; Royal Engineers (first Commander UDR) * (1970–1971)
- Brigadier Denis Ormerod CBE Royal Irish Fusiliers, (First Roman Catholic Commander UDR) (1971–1973)
- Brigadier Harry Baxter CBE GM (First Irish Commander, also 2nd Colonel Commandant) Punjab Regiment/Royal Irish Fusiliers (1973–1976)
- Brigadier Mervyn McCord CBE, MC, ADC (1976–1978) Royal Ulster Rifles, Royal Irish Rangers.
- Brigadier David Millar OBE Border Regiment (joint author of "The Way ahead" Ulsterisation document) (1978–1980)
- Brigadier Patrick Hargrave (1980–1982) Worcestershire and Sherwood Foresters Regiment
- Lieutenant General Sir Peter Graham (1982–1984) Gordon Highlanders
- Brigadier Roger St Clair Preston (1984–1986) The Light Infantry
- Brigadier Michael Bray CBE (author of the Bray Reforms) Duke of Wellington's Regiment (1986–1988)
- Brigadier Charles Ritchie CBE Royal Scots (1988–1990)
- Brigadier Angus Ramsay CBE, DSO Royal Highland Fusiliers (1990–1992)

=== Colonels Commandant ===
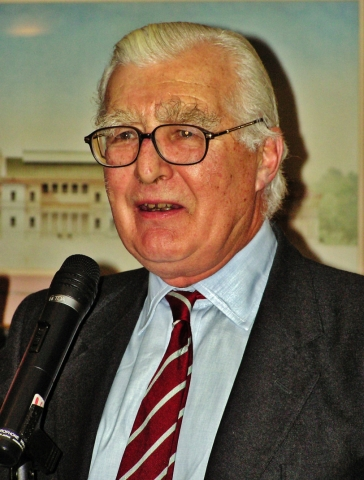
General Sir Charles Huxtable KCB CBE DL

- General Sir John Anderson GCB, KCB DSO (1969–1977) (5th Royal Inniskilling Dragoon Guards) (1st Colonel Commandant).
- Brigadier Harry Baxter CBE GM (1977–1986).
- General Sir David Young (1986–1991) Royal Scots.
- General Sir Charles Huxtable (1991–1992) Duke of Wellington's Regiment. Huxtable continued as Colonel Commandant of the Royal Irish Regiment until 1996.

=== Regimental Colonel ===
Colonel Sir Dennis Faulkner CBE VRD UD Royal Naval Reserve/3 UDR (1982–1992)

=== Notable personnel ===
- Category:Ulster Defence Regiment soldiers
- Category:Ulster Defence Regiment officers

== Bibliography ==
- Dillon, Martin. The Dirty War, Arrow 1991, ISBN 0-09-984520-2
- Ellison, Graham: Smyth, Jim. The Crowned Harp: Policing Northern Ireland, Pluto Press, 2000, ISBN 0-7453-1393-0
- English, Richard. Armed Struggle;– A History of the IRA, MacMillan, London 2003, ISBN 1-4050-0108-9
- Gamble, Ronnie. Echo Company, The History of E Company 5th Battalion of the Ulster Defence Regiment, 2007. The Regimental Association of the Ulster Defence Regiment, ISBN 978-0-9558069-0-2
- Gamble, Ronnie. My Service Life, 1939-1979: William (Bill) Balmer, 2009, Causeway Museum Service, ISBN 978-0-9552286-4-3
- Hezlet. Sir ArthurThe B-Specials: A History of the Ulster Special Constabulary (1972) ISBN 0-85468-272-4
- Human Rights Watch. Human Rights in Northern Ireland, Yale University Press, (1993), ISBN 0300056230
- Larkin, Paul. A very British Jihad: Collusion, Conspiracy & Cover-up in Northern Ireland, Beyond the Pale Publications, Belfast 2004, ISBN 1-900960-25-7
- McKitterick, David. Lost Lives, Mainstream Publishing, 2004, ISBN 184018504X
- McKitterick, David: McVea, David. Making Sense of the Troubles, Penguin Books 2001, ISBN 0-14-100305-7
- Potter, John Furniss. A Testimony to Courage – the Regimental History of the Ulster Defence Regiment 1969 – 1992, Pen & Sword Books Ltd, 2001, ISBN 0-85052-819-4
- Ripley, Tim: Chappell, Mike. Security Forces in Northern Ireland 1969–92, ISBN 1-85532-278-1
- Ryder, Chris. The Ulster Defence Regiment: An Instrument of Peace?, 1991 ISBN 0-413-64800-1
- Weitzer, Ronald. Transforming Settler States: Communal Conflict and Internal Security in Northern Ireland and Zimbabwe, University of California Press, 1990, ISBN 978-0-520-06490-4
- Wood, Ian S.Crimes of Loyalty: A History of the UDA, Edinburgh University Press, 2006, ISBN 0-7486-2427-9
