= Harry Baxter =

Henry Baxter
- Born: 8 April 1921; County Kilkenny, Ireland
- Died: 10 January 2007 (aged 85)
- Military career
- Allegiance: United Kingdom
- Branch: British Army
- Rank: Brigadier
- Service number: 363915
- Commands: Ulster Defence Regiment

Brigadier Henry Joseph Patrick Baxter CBE GM (8 April 1921 – 10 January 2007) was an Irish born fourth generation soldier who overcame the handicap of being blind in one eye to join the army and rose to command one of the largest and most controversial regiments in the British Army.

== Indian Army ==
Harry Baxter was born a "child of the regiment" to the Royal Irish Fusiliers. Despite being blind in his right eye as the result of a childhood shooting accident in India, he was determined to join the British Army in 1939. The medical officer who tested him was impressed to meet someone who was trying to cheat his way "into" the army that he passed him fit for the British Indian Army. He gave up a scholarship place at Oxford University and received an emergency commission as a second lieutenant in the Indian Army on 11 October 1942 with the service number of 363915. Baxter's service in India was mostly wartime and he served in Burma. His emergency commission was changed to a permanent commission in the British Army on 25 May 1946 when he joined the Royal Irish Fusiliers (RIrF) as a lieutenant.

=== Royal Irish Fusiliers ===
In 1947 Baxter transferred to the RIrF on a regular (permanent) commission and served in Palestine, Egypt, Greece, Germany and finally Malaya where he was Mentioned in Despatches During this time he spent four years on Extra Regimental Engagement (ERE) to Lord Mountbatten's staff. Between 1963 and 1966 he was the commander of the North Irish Brigade's depot in Eglinton Camp, County Londonderry and St Patrick's Barracks, County Antrim and also spent a period as a staff officer with the Berlin Brigade before being appointed Brigadier UDR. He was appointed an OBE in the 1968 Queen's Birthday Honours list.

==== George Medal ====
Baxter was awarded the George Medal for his actions at Gough Barracks, Armagh when, as a major, he and Captain Henry Chavasse removed a viable bomb from outside the armoury and drove it to a safe place for disposal. The detonator of the bomb exploded whilst it was in transit but the device did not explode.

=== Ulster Defence Regiment ===
Baxter assumed command of the Ulster Defence Regiment (UDR) in April 1973 from Brigadier Denis Ormerod. Like Ormerod, Baxter was a Roman Catholic commanding a locally raised and predominantly Protestant regiment during a time of intercommunal strife.

He was in command during the notable Ulster Workers' Council strike in 1974 which was considered to be a "turning point" in the regiment's history and "coming of age" comments listed by Major John Potter in his unofficial history of the regiment.

Having a brigadier as regimental commander was unusual in the modern British Army but the size of the Ulster Defence Regiment with its 11 battalions and over 9,000 men and women (at its peak) demanded an officer of higher rank than colonel.

Baxter was the commander of the UDR at the time of the Miami Showband killings, when several soldiers of the regiment were involved in the killing of musicians outside the town of Banbridge.

He returned to the UDR in 1977 as colonel commandant of the regiment until 1986.

== Bibliography ==
- Doherty, Richard (2010). In the Ranks of Death: The Irish in the Second World War. Barnsley: Pen and Sword Books. pp. 37–8. ISBN 978-1-84415-966-6.
- Potter, John (2001). A Testimony to Courage: The Regimental History of the Ulster Defence Regiment 1969–1992. Barnsley: Pen and Sword Books. ISBN 0-85052-819-4.
- Ryder, Chris (1991). The Ulster Defence Regiment: An Instrument of Peace?. London: Methuen Publishing. ISBN 0-413-64800-1.
