= BID 150 =

British voice encryption device

A British voice encryption device used with (for example) Larkspur radio system sets.

BID means 'British Inter Departmental'. These systems or equipment types were generally used by more than one single governmental agency or department. The authority for BID's was the Communications-Electronics Security Group (CESG) who were part of Government Communications Headquarters (GCHQ).

The BID/150 speech encryption key generator is a single channel device for use with the British Army C42 and C45 Larkspur radio system. This was the first Combat Net secure speech system whose key was set through the use of punch cards within the device. Examples of the BID/150 are on display at the Royal Signals Museum, Blandford Forum.

It was first used operationally by the 15th Signal Regiment during the Aden crisis in the late 1960s and was widely used from battalion level up to corps headquarters. It remained in use until the early 1980s.

In secure mode the analogue speech signal is digitized, then encrypted by combination with the digital key generated by the BID/150; the digital stream is then fed to the transmitter, to pulse modulate the carrier. On receive, the sequence is reversed.

Good radio performance was needed for reliable secure working. To this end, vehicles carrying the C42-DM-BID/150 system were issued with a 27-foot mast and an elevated antenna. The set carried a 'Goodman Box', to check signal strengths and antenna performance. The operator had searching set-up and performance drills to be strictly followed.
