= Denis Ormerod =

British Army officer (1922–2005)

Brigadier Denis Ormerod CBE
- Born: February 17, 1922; Ireland, United Kingdom
- Died: February 11, 2005 (aged 82); High Halden, Kent, England
- Spouse: Frances M. S. Turner
- Military career
- Allegiance: United Kingdom
- Branch: British Army
- Rank: Brigadier
- Units: British Indian Army, Royal Irish Fusiliers
- Commands: Ulster Defence Regiment
- Awards: CBE

Denis Leonard Ormerod CBE (February 17, 1922 – February 11, 2005) was a career soldier in the British Army.

He was appointed Brigadier Ulster Defence Regiment in July 1971. He was the first Roman Catholic commander of the regiment, which was drawn mainly from the Protestant community of Northern Ireland.

== Early life and military career ==
Ormerod was educated at Downside School in Somerset. He joined the army in 1940 and was commissioned into the British Indian Army. He served in Malaya, India, Italy, and Greece with the Gurkhas, eventually reaching the rank of major. He also served in Malaya and Palestine during internal security operations in the post-war period.

== Ulster Defence Regiment ==
Whether or not it was a conscious decision on the part of the British Ministry of Defence was unknown, but he acknowledged that his religion helped him establish a rapport with the hierarchy of the Roman Catholic Church in Northern Ireland.

== Bibliography ==
- Potter, John. A Testimony to Courage – the Regimental History of the Ulster Defence Regiment 1969 – 1992, Pen & Sword Books Ltd, 2001. ISBN 0-85052-819-4.
- Ryder, Chris. The Ulster Defence Regiment: An Instrument of Peace?, p. 43. 1991 ISBN 0-413-64800-1
