= Large regiment =

Multi-battalion British Army formation

A large regiment is a multi-battalion infantry formation of the British Army. First formed in the 1960s, large regiments are the result of the amalgamation of a number of existing single-battalion regiments, and perpetuate the traditions of each of the predecessor units.

== Origins ==
Up to 1948, line infantry regiments in the British Army had two battalions, in the form that had been implemented under the 1881 Childers Reforms, which was intended to allow each regiment to have one battalion stationed in the UK, and the other stationed overseas. However, Indian independence in 1947 saw plans put in place to reduce all of the British Army's line infantry and rifles regiments to a single battalion. Although some regiments temporarily raised new battalions during the early 1950s, following the Defence Review announced in 1957, the majority of regular infantry of the British Army consisted of single-battalion regiments grouped in administrative "brigades", consisting of anywhere from two to eight battalions. (Note: The Parachute Regiment, consisting of three battalions, was part of the Glider Pilot and Parachute Corps, while the Brigade of Gurkhas, the overall administrative formation for Gurkhas in the British Army, consisted of four two-battalion infantry regiments plus engineers, signals and provost units) (Note: As well as the infantry units of the British Army, the Royal Marines included a total of five battalion-sized commando infantry units in 1960.)

Infantry prior to the 1957 Defence Review
| Guards Brigade (Note: The Grenadier Guards, Coldstream Guards and Scots Guards, had multiple battalions) | Lowland Brigade | Highland Brigade | Home Counties Brigade | East Anglian Brigade |
|---|---|---|---|---|
| Grenadier Guards (Note: 3rd Battalion, Grenadier Guards placed in "suspended animation" in March 1961) | The Royal Scots (The Royal Regiment) | The Black Watch (Royal Highland Regiment) (Note: 2nd Battalion, Black Watch re-raised April 1952 to October 1956) | The Queen's Royal Regiment (West Surrey) | The Royal Norfolk Regiment |
| Coldstream Guards (Note: 3rd Battalion, Coldstream Guards placed in "suspended animation" in December 1959) | The Royal Scots Fusiliers | The Highland Light Infantry (City of Glasgow; Regiment) | The Buffs (Royal East Kent Regiment) | The Suffolk Regiment |
| Scots Guards | The King's Own Scottish Borderers | The Seaforth Highlanders (Ross-shire Buffs, The Duke of Albany's) | The Royal Fusiliers (City of London Regiment) (Note: The Royal Northumberland Fusiliers, Royal Fusiliers (City of London Regiment) and Lancashire Fusiliers were removed from their respective regional brigades and amalgamated into a single Fusilier Brigade in 1958) | The Bedfordshire and Hertfordshire Regiment |
| Irish Guards | The Cameronians (Scottish Rifles) | The Gordon Highlanders | The East Surrey Regiment | The Essex Regiment |
| Welsh Guards | | The Queen's Own Cameron Highlanders | The Queen's Own Royal West Kent Regiment | The Royal Sussex Regiment |
| | | The Argyll and Sutherland Highlanders (Princess Louise's) | The Middlesex Regiment (Duke of Cambridge's Own) | The Northamptonshire Regiment |
| Midland Brigade (Note: The Midland Brigade was renamed as the Forester Brigade in 1958) | Mercian Brigade | Welsh Brigade | Wessex Brigade | Lancastrian Brigade |
| The Royal Warwickshire Regiment | The Cheshire Regiment | The Royal Welch Fusiliers (Note: 2nd Battalion, Royal Welch Fusiliers re-raised April 1952 to December 1957) | The Devonshire Regiment | The King's Own Royal Regiment (Lancaster) |
| The Royal Lincolnshire Regiment (Note: The Royal Lincolnshire Regiment was transferred to the East Anglian Brigade in 1958) | The Worcestershire Regiment | The South Wales Borderers | The Gloucestershire Regiment | The King's Regiment (Liverpool) |
| The Royal Leicestershire Regiment | The South Staffordshire Regiment | The Welch Regiment | The Royal Hampshire Regiment | The Lancashire Fusiliers (Note: 2nd Battalion, Lancashire Fusiliers re-raised January 1952 to February 1955) |
| The Sherwood Foresters (Nottinghamshire and Derbyshire Regiment) (Note: 2nd Battalion, Sherwood Foresters re-raised January 1952 to December 1955) | The North Staffordshire Regiment (The Prince of Wales's) | | The Dorset Regiment | The East Lancashire Regiment |
| | | | The Royal Berkshire Regiment (Princess; Charlotte of Wales's) | The Border Regiment |
| | | | The Wiltshire Regiment (Duke of Edinburgh's) | The South Lancashire Regiment (Prince of Wales's Volunteers) |
| | | | | The Loyal Regiment (North Lancashire) |
| | | | | The Manchester Regiment |
| Yorkshire and Northumberland Brigade (Note: Renamed as the Yorkshire Brigade following the transfer of the Royal Northumberland Fusiliers) | North Irish Brigade | Light Infantry Brigade | Green Jackets Brigade | Brigade of Gurkhas (Note: Until the late 1960s, the four Gurkha infantry regiments each consisted of two battalions) |
| The Royal Northumberland Fusiliers | The Royal Inniskilling Fusiliers (Note: 2nd Battalion, Royal Inniskilling Fusiliers re-raised April 1952 to September 1956) | The Somerset Light Infantry (Prince Albert's) | The King's Royal Rifle Corps (Note: 2nd Battalion, King's Royal Rifle Corps re-raised March 1951 to December 1957) | 2nd King Edward VII's Own Gurkha Rifles (The Sirmoor Rifles) |
| The West Yorkshire Regiment (The Prince of Wales's Own) | The Royal Ulster Rifles | The Duke of Cornwall's Light infantry | The Rifle Brigade (Prince Consort's Own) | 6th Queen Elizabeth's Own Gurkha Rifles |
| The East Yorkshire Regiment (Duke of York's Own) | The Royal Irish Fusiliers (Princess Victoria's) | The Oxfordshire and Buckinghamshire Light Infantry (Note: The Oxfordshire and Buckinghamshire Light Infantry was transferred to the Green Jackets Brigade in 1958) | | 7th Duke of Edinburgh's Own Gurkha Rifles |
| The Green Howards (Alexandra, Princess of Wales's; Own Regiment of Yorkshire) (Note: 2nd Battalion, Green Howards re-raised April 1952 to May 1956) | | The King's Own Yorkshire Light Infantry | | 10th Princess Mary's Own Gurkha Rifles |
| The Duke of Wellington's Regiment (West Riding) | | The King's Shropshire Light Infantry | | Glider Pilot and Parachute Corps (Note: The Glider Pilot and Parachute Corps was disbanded in 1957, with the Parachute Regiment becoming an independent unit, The other part of the corps, the Glider Pilot Regiment, formed part of the newly established Army Air Corps) |
| The York and Lancaster Regiment (Note: 2nd Battalion, York and Lancaster Regiment re-raised April 1952 to July 1955) | | The Durham Light Infantry (Note: 2nd Battalion, Durham Light Infantry re-raised January 1952 to December 1955) | | The Parachute Regiment |

Although the battalions in a brigade (with the exception of the Guards and Gurkha brigades) shared a common depot and cap badge, they maintained a separate regimental identity. Reductions in troop numbers following the 1957 review had necessitated the amalgamation of pairs of regiments within the brigades from 1958 to 1961, a process that sometimes proved controversial.

| Royal Scots Fusiliers | Royal Highland Fusiliers (Princess Margaret's Own Glasgow and Ayrshire Regiment) |
| Highland Light Infantry (City of Glasgow Regiment) | Royal Highland Fusiliers (Princess Margaret's Own Glasgow and Ayrshire Regiment) |
| Seaforth Highlanders (Ross-shire Buffs, The Duke of Albany's) | Queen's Own Highlanders (Seaforth and Camerons) |
| Queen's Own Cameron Highlanders | Queen's Own Highlanders (Seaforth and Camerons) |
| Queen's Royal Regiment (West Surrey) | Queen's Royal Surrey Regiment |
| East Surrey Regiment | Queen's Royal Surrey Regiment |
| The Buffs (Royal East Kent Regiment) | Queen's Own Buffs, The Royal Kent Regiment |
| Queen's Own Royal West Kent Regiment | Queen's Own Buffs, The Royal Kent Regiment |
| Royal Norfolk Regiment | 1st East Anglian Regiment (Royal Norfolk and Suffolk) |
| Suffolk Regiment | 1st East Anglian Regiment (Royal Norfolk and Suffolk) |
| Royal Lincolnshire Regiment | 2nd East Anglian Regiment (Duchess of Gloucester's Own Royal; Lincolnshire and Northamptonshire) |
| Northamptonshire Regiment | 2nd East Anglian Regiment (Duchess of Gloucester's Own Royal; Lincolnshire and Northamptonshire) |
| Bedfordshire and Hertfordshire Regiment | 3rd East Anglian Regiment (16th/44th Foot) |
| Essex Regiment | 3rd East Anglian Regiment (16th/44th Foot) |
| South Staffordshire Regiment | Staffordshire Regiment (Prince of Wales's) |
| North Staffordshire Regiment (The Prince of Wales's) | Staffordshire Regiment (Prince of Wales's) |
| Devonshire Regiment | Devonshire and Dorset Regiment |
| Dorset Regiment | Devonshire and Dorset Regiment |
| Royal Berkshire Regiment (Princess Charlotte of Wales's) | Duke of Edinburgh's Royal Regiment (Berkshire and Wiltshire) |
| Wiltshire Regiment (Duke of Edinburgh's) | Duke of Edinburgh's Royal Regiment (Berkshire and Wiltshire) |
| East Lancashire Regiment | Lancashire Regiment (Prince of Wales's Volunteers) |
| South Lancashire Regiment (Prince of Wales's Volunteers) | Lancashire Regiment (Prince of Wales's Volunteers) |
| King's Regiment (Liverpool) | King's Regiment (Manchester and Liverpool) |
| Manchester Regiment | King's Regiment (Manchester and Liverpool) |
| King's Own Royal Regiment (Lancaster) | King's Own Royal Border Regiment |
| Border Regiment | King's Own Royal Border Regiment |
| West Yorkshire Regiment (Prince of Wales's Own) | Prince of Wales's Own Regiment of Yorkshire |
| East Yorkshire Regiment (Duke of York's Own) | Prince of Wales's Own Regiment of Yorkshire |
| Somerset Light Infantry (Prince Albert's) | Somerset and Cornwall Light Infantry |
| Duke of Cornwall's Light Infantry | Somerset and Cornwall Light Infantry |

=== Genesis of the large regiment ===
The idea of the "large regiment" originated in 1962. Speaking in the House of Commons on 8 March, the Minister of War, John Profumo, stated that there was not going to be a further extensive reorganisation of army units. However, talking of the need to increase flexibility in the services, he noted that the regimental system of the infantry could be said to "stand in the way of change". He stated that the transition from the regimental to the brigade system "had on the whole been going well" and it was now time to see if there were "tangible advantages from the point of view of recruiting and flexibility" to be gained from a "large regiment system".

On 16 March The Times reported that the War Office were in the early stages of planning for the creation of large regiments. The plan involved the conversion of the existing brigades into regiments, with each of the regiments forming a numbered battalion of the large regiment. The creation of the multi-battalion regiments would allow the infantry to be expanded or reduced as needed. This could be done by the increase or decrease in the number of battalions of each regiment, rather than by the emotive process of merging or disbanding historic single-battalion regiments. The report noted that this process had effectively already begun in the East Anglian and Green Jackets Brigades, where regiments had been redesignated or amalgamated as the 1st, 2nd and 3rd East Anglian Regiments and 1st, 2nd and 3rd Green Jackets.

== The first large regiments ==
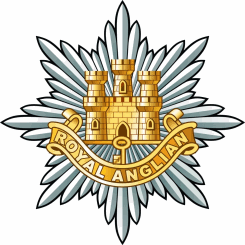
The Royal Anglian Regiment was the first 'large' regiment to be created, through the amalgamation of the four regiments of the East Anglian Brigade

In 1963, the first preparations for the introduction of large regiments began with the disbanding of the Forester Brigade. The Royal Lincolnshire Regiment had transferred to the East Anglian Brigade and amalgamated with the Northamptonshire Regiment in 1958. Five years later, the three remaining battalions were also moved, with the Royal Warwickshire Regiment moving to the Fusilier Brigade (and being renamed as the Royal Warwickshire Fusiliers); the Royal Leicestershire Regiment to the East Anglian Brigade; and the Sherwood Foresters to the Mercian Brigade.

In February 1964, approval for the creation of the first large regiment was given, with the Royal Anglian Regiment to be formed from the four regular battalions of the East Anglian Brigade. The new regiment was formed on 1 September. In May 1965 it was announced that the regiments of the Green Jackets Brigade were to become the three-battalion Royal Green Jackets from 1 January 1966.

In September 1965, figures showed that the new large regiments were recruiting more successfully than the remaining single-battalion regiments, some of which were only at rifle company strength. In particular the Welsh, North Irish and Lancastrian Brigades were under strength. It was thought that the Yorkshire Brigade and Home Counties Brigade were likely to form large regiments in the near future, while plans to merge the battalions of the Highland Brigade were only being delayed by failure to agree on a common tartan to be worn. While the Army Board could not compel regiments to amalgamate, it was their stated "wish and intention" that they should. The survival of the weaker brigades was under doubt, while a feasibility study into the formation of a single "Corps of Infantry" was initiated.

In June 1966, it was announced that the regiments of the Home Counties Brigade had agreed to form the third large regiment. Accordingly, on 31 December, the four regiments became the Queen's Regiment. By July 1967, three more Brigades had opted to become large regiments. All three mergers occurred in 1968: the Fusilier Brigade became the Royal Regiment of Fusiliers on 23 April, the North Irish Brigade became the Royal Irish Rangers on 1 July and the Light Infantry Brigade became The Light Infantry on 10 July.

The Defence White Paper of 1967 reduced the number of infantry battalions, with the large regiments all losing one battalion in 1968. The six brigades that had chosen not to form large regiments were also to lose a battalion: (Note: The four infantry regiments of the Brigade of Gurkhas were also scheduled to each lose a battalion.) the decision to amalgamate a pair of regiments (Note: Three new single battalion regiments were created out of this process – the South Wales Borderers and the Welch Regiment united to form the Royal Regiment of Wales in 1969; the Lancashire Regiment and the Loyal Regiment (North Lancashire) amalgamated into the Queen's Lancashire Regiment, and the Worcestershire Regiment and the Sherwood Foresters were united as the Worcestershire and Sherwood Foresters Regiment, both in 1970. A further amalgamation was planned between the Gloucestershire Regiment and the Royal Hampshire Regiment.) or to disband the junior regiment (Note: Three regiments, the Cameronians (Scottish Rifles), the York and Lancaster Regiment, and the Argyll and Sutherland Highlanders, chose to disband rather than amalgamate. The 1st battalions of the Cameronians and the York and Lancaster Regiment were disbanded in 1968.) being left to the council of colonels of the brigade.

- The Royal Anglian Regiment – formed 1 September 1964 from:
  - 1st East Anglian Regiment (Royal Norfolk and Suffolk) – 1st Battalion
  - 2nd East Anglian Regiment (Duchess of Gloucester's Own Royal Lincolnshire and Northamptonshire) – 2nd Battalion
  - 3rd East Anglian Regiment (16th/44th Foot) – 3rd Battalion
  - The Royal Leicestershire Regiment – 4th Battalion (Note: 4th Battalion, Royal Anglian Regiment was reduced to a single company (Tiger Company) in 1970, before being disbanded in 1975)
- The Royal Green Jackets – formed 1 January 1966 from:
  - 1st Green Jackets (43rd and 52nd) – 1st Battalion
  - 2nd Green Jackets, The King's Royal Rifle Corps – 2nd Battalion
  - 3rd Green Jackets, The Rifle Brigade – 3rd Battalion (Note: 3rd Battalion, Royal Green Jackets was reduced to a single company (R Company) in 1970, before being reformed in 1972)
- The Queen's Regiment – formed 31 December 1966 from:
  - The Queen's Royal Surrey Regiment – 1st Battalion
  - The Queen's Own Buffs, The Royal Kent Regiment – 2nd Battalion
  - The Royal Sussex Regiment – 3rd Battalion
  - The Middlesex Regiment (Duke of Cambridge's Own) – 4th Battalion (Note: 4th Battalion, Queen's Regiment was reduced to a single company (Albuhera Company) in 1971, before being disbanded in 1973)
- The Royal Regiment of Fusiliers – formed 23 April 1968 from:
  - The Royal Northumberland Fusiliers – 1st Battalion
  - The Royal Warwickshire Fusiliers – 2nd Battalion
  - The Royal Fusiliers (City of London Regiment) – 3rd Battalion
  - The Lancashire Fusiliers – 4th Battalion (Note: 4th Battalion, Royal Regiment of Fusiliers was disbanded on 1 November 1969)
- The Royal Irish Rangers (27th (Inniskilling), 83rd and 87th) – formed 1 July 1968 from:
  - The Royal Inniskilling Fusiliers – 1st Battalion (Note: 1st Battalion, Royal Irish Rangers was disbanded on 23 November 1968, with the 3rd Battalion concurrently renumbered as the 1st Battalion)
  - The Royal Ulster Rifles – 2nd Battalion
  - The Royal Irish Fusiliers (Princess Victoria's) – 3rd Battalion
- The Light Infantry – formed 10 July 1968 from:
  - The Somerset and Cornwall Light Infantry – 1st Battalion
  - The King's Own Yorkshire Light Infantry – 2nd Battalion
  - The King's Shropshire Light Infantry – 3rd Battalion
  - The Durham Light Infantry – 4th Battalion (Note: 4th Battalion, The Light Infantry was disbanded on 31 March 1969)

On 1 July 1968, the brigade system was abandoned, with the infantry being grouped in six administrative "divisions" instead. Individual regimental cap badges were reintroduced and the creation of large regiments effectively ceased. Following a change of government in 1970, a policy of retaining single-battalion regiments was implemented. (Note: The change in policy regarding single battalion regiments saw a reversal of the planned amalgamation of the Gloucestershire Regiment and Royal Hampshire Regiment, as well as the disbanding of the Argyll and Sutherland Highlanders – the Royal Hampshire Regiment and the Argyll and Sutherland Highlanders, along with three battalions from the new large regiments, one from the Scots Guards, and one from the Brigade of Gurkhas were retained as single companies. Five of the seven independent companies were subsequently reformed as full battalions.)

The majority of the new large regiments formed between 1964 and 1968 were grouped together into two of the new administrative divisions – the Queen's Regiment, Royal Regiment of Fusiliers and Royal Anglian Regiment together formed the Queen's Division, while the Light Infantry and Royal Green Jackets made up the new Light Division. The Royal Irish Rangers was allocated, along with the single battalion regiments from the North of England, to the King's Division. The remaining three were the Guards Division (the five regiments of foot guards), the Scottish Division (the remaining Scottish line infantry regiments), and the Prince of Wales' Division (regiments from Wales and the West of England).

=== Ulster Defence Regiment ===
In 1970, an additional large regiment was formed following the establishment of the Ulster Defence Regiment. This was created to replace the Ulster Special Constabulary, a quasi-military reserve policing force, in order to remove duties more suited to the military from civilian control in Northern Ireland, which, at the time, had seen increasing violence occurring (regarded as the beginning of the period known as "The Troubles"). The Ulster Defence Regiment was established on 1 January 1970, with the intention of forming a number of local battalions, each established within a county or other local area within the province. On 1 April 1970, the first seven battalions became part of the British Army's order of battle. Upon its establishment, the Ulster Defence Regiment was the biggest infantry regiment in the British Army.

- The Ulster Defence Regiment – formed 1 January 1970
  - 1st (County Antrim) Battalion (Note: Formed 1 April 1970)
  - 2nd (County Armagh) Battalion
  - 3rd (County Down) Battalion
  - 4th (County Fermanagh) Battalion
  - 5th (County Londonderry) Battalion
  - 6th (County Tyrone) Battalion
  - 7th (City of Belfast) Battalion

== Expansion and contraction ==
=== Expansion in the 1970s ===
Although the formation of the Ulster Defence Regiment, initially with seven battalions, saw a major increase in the Army's presence in Northern Ireland, the continuing presence of the Regular Army (under Operation BANNER), which required infantry battalions to be deployed on regular roulement tours, led to the difficulties in being able to meet the UK's standing commitments to NATO in addition to the requirements of Northern Ireland, and saw the decision taken to increase the number of available infantry battalions. (Note: The commitment to Northern Ireland also saw infantry units of the Royal Marines utilised on roulement tours in addition to those of the British Army)

Following the cuts to the infantry in the late 1960s, a total of seven infantry battalions had been reduced to single incremental companies between August 1970 and March 1971, five of which were part of existing, multi-battalion regiments:

- 2nd Battalion, Scots Guards (Note: Although the 2nd Battalion, Scots Guards was placed in suspended animation, with a single company retaining its independent status, two further companies were also retained; F Company reinforced the 1st Battalion, Irish Guards in Hong Kong, and S Company, following a tour of British Honduras, went to reinforce the 2nd Battalion, Grenadier Guards.)
- 4th Battalion, The Queen's Regiment
- 4th Battalion, The Royal Anglian Regiment
- 3rd Battalion, The Royal Green Jackets
- 2nd Battalion, 2nd King Edward VII's Own Gurkha Rifles (The Sirmoor Rifles) (Note: The four infantry regiments of the Brigade of Gurkhas were each reduced through the amalgamation of their 1st and 2nd Battalions – the 10th Gurkha Rifles underwent this process on 19 September 1968, 6th Gurkha Rifles on 16 June 1969 and 7th Gurkha Rifles on 1 August 1970. The 2nd Gurkha Rifles was to also have been reduced to a single battalion, but the process was halted, and instead the 2nd Battalion was one of those reduced to company size.)

By the end of 1971, the decision had been taken that three of these battalions, alongside a pair of single battalion infantry regiments, would be reformed in an effort to ensure that the Army's commitments to both the BAOR and Northern Ireland could be met. The battalions of the Scots Guards and Royal Green Jackets, alongside the 1st Battalions of the Royal Hampshire Regiment and the Argyll and Sutherland Highlanders (Princess Louise's) were reformed in January 1972. Additionally, a reworking of the policy concerning the use of Gurkha infantry was devised - for the first time, a battalion of Gurkhas would be permanently stationed in the UK, thus ensuring that, in the event of another unit being required for deployment to Northern Ireland, capacity for other duties could be maintained. To put this policy into practice, it was determined that at least five Gurkha infantry battalions were required, and led to the 2nd Gurkha Rifles' battalion also being reformed. As well as the increase to the regular infantry, between December 1971 and July 1972, the Ulster Defence Regiment raised an additional four battalions:

- 8th (County Tyrone) Battalion (Note: Formed 1 December 1971)
- 9th (County Antrim) Battalion (Note: Formed 15 December 1971)
- 10th (City of Belfast) Battalion (Note: Formed 15 January 1972)
- 11th (Craigavon) Battalion (Note: Formed 1 July 1972)

=== Contraction in the 1980s ===
In 1982, the infantry expanded further with the addition of another new battalion of Gurkhas - increased immigration from China into Hong Kong saw the reformation of the 2nd Battalion, 7th Duke of Edinburgh's Own Gurkha Rifles in April 1982 to provide additional infantry support in the territory. The battalion remained in place for five years until it was again disbanded in 1987. The Ulster Defence Regiment was also reduced in size during the 1980s through a number of amalgamations of individual battalions from the same areas:

- 1st/9th (Country Antrim) Battalion – formed 20 May 1984
- 7th/10th (City of Belfast) Battalion – formed 14 October 1984

== Options for Change ==
Under the Options for Change defence cuts announced in 1990, the number of infantry battalions was to be reduced. While some of the reductions were effected by the merger of pairs of single-battalion regiments, (Note: The Queen's Own Highlanders and Gordon Highlanders were amalgamated into the single-battalion Highlanders (Seaforth, Gordons and Camerons), while the Duke of Edinburgh's Royal Regiment and Gloucestershire Regiment became the Royal Gloucestershire, Berkshire and Wiltshire Regiment, again with a single battalion. Similar mergers between the Royal Scots and King's Own Scottish Borderers, and the 22nd (Cheshire) Regiment and Staffordshire Regiment, were cancelled.) two existing large regiments were further amalgamated, and the four single battalion infantry regiments of the Brigade of Gurkhas became a large regiment. (Note: Following the reformation of the 2nd Battalion, 7th Gurkha Rifles in 1982, the Brigade of Gurkhas stood at six battalions. This was reduced to five when the 7th Gurkha Rifles was again reduced back to a single battalion, and to four in September 1992, when the two battalions of the 2nd Gurkha Rifles were amalgamated into a single battalion.)

- The Royal Irish Regiment (27th (Inniskilling), 83rd, 87th and Ulster Defence Regiment) – formed 1 July 1992 from: (Note: Upon its formation, the Royal Irish Regiment was the largest in the army with a total of nine regular battalions. Of these, the 1st and 2nd Battalions were the general service battalions of the Royal Irish Rangers, while the 3rd to 9th Battalions were the home defence battalions of the Ulster Defence Regiment. The 2nd Battalion was disbanded in April 1993)
  - The Royal Irish Rangers (27th (Inniskilling), 83rd and 87th)
  - The Ulster Defence Regiment (Note: Following the amalgamations of two pairs of battalions in 1984, two more pairs of battalions additionally amalgamated in 1991 to form the 2nd/11th and 4th/6th Battalions, leaving a total of seven battalions of the Ulster Defence Regiment when it amalgamated with the Royal Irish Rangers)
- The Princess of Wales's Royal Regiment (Queen's and Royal Hampshires) – formed 9 September 1992 from: (Note: The three battalions of the Queen's Regiment and single battalion of the Royal Hampshire Regiment effectively ceased to exist upon the merger of the two, with the personnel of the two regiments distributed equally between the two newly constituted battalions of the Princess of Wales's Royal Regiment)
  - The Queen's Regiment
  - The Royal Hampshire Regiment
- The Royal Gurkha Rifles – formed 1 July 1994 from:
  - 2nd King Edward VII's Own Gurkha Rifles (The Sirmoor Rifles) (Note: 2nd King Edward VII's Own Gurkha Rifles and 6th Queen Elizabeth's Own Gurkha Rifles were amalgamated to form the single 1st Battalion)
  - 6th Queen Elizabeth's Own Gurkha Rifles
  - 7th Duke of Edinburgh's Own Gurkha Rifles (Note: 7th Duke of Edinburgh's Own Gurkha Rifles was renamed as the 2nd Battalion)
  - 10th Princess Mary's Own Gurkha Rifles (Note: 10th Princess Mary's Own Gurkha Rifles was renamed as the 3rd Battalion. 3rd Battalion, Royal Gurkha Rifles was disbanded on 26 November 1996)

In addition to the battalions of the Royal Irish Regiment and the Royal Gurkha Rifles, seven more multi-battalion regiments also lost a battalion. (Note: The Grenadier Guards, Coldstream Guards and Scots Guards lost their second battalions, while the Royal Regiment of Fusiliers, Royal Anglian Regiment, Light Infantry and Royal Green Jackets were reduced to two battalions) (Note: The colours and traditions of the 2nd Battalion Grenadier Guards, 2nd Battalion Coldstream Guards, 2nd Battalion Scots Guards and 5th Battalion Royal Regiment of Scotland are each perpetuated by a reinforced infantry company serving as a permanent public duties unit)

== Future Infantry Structure ==
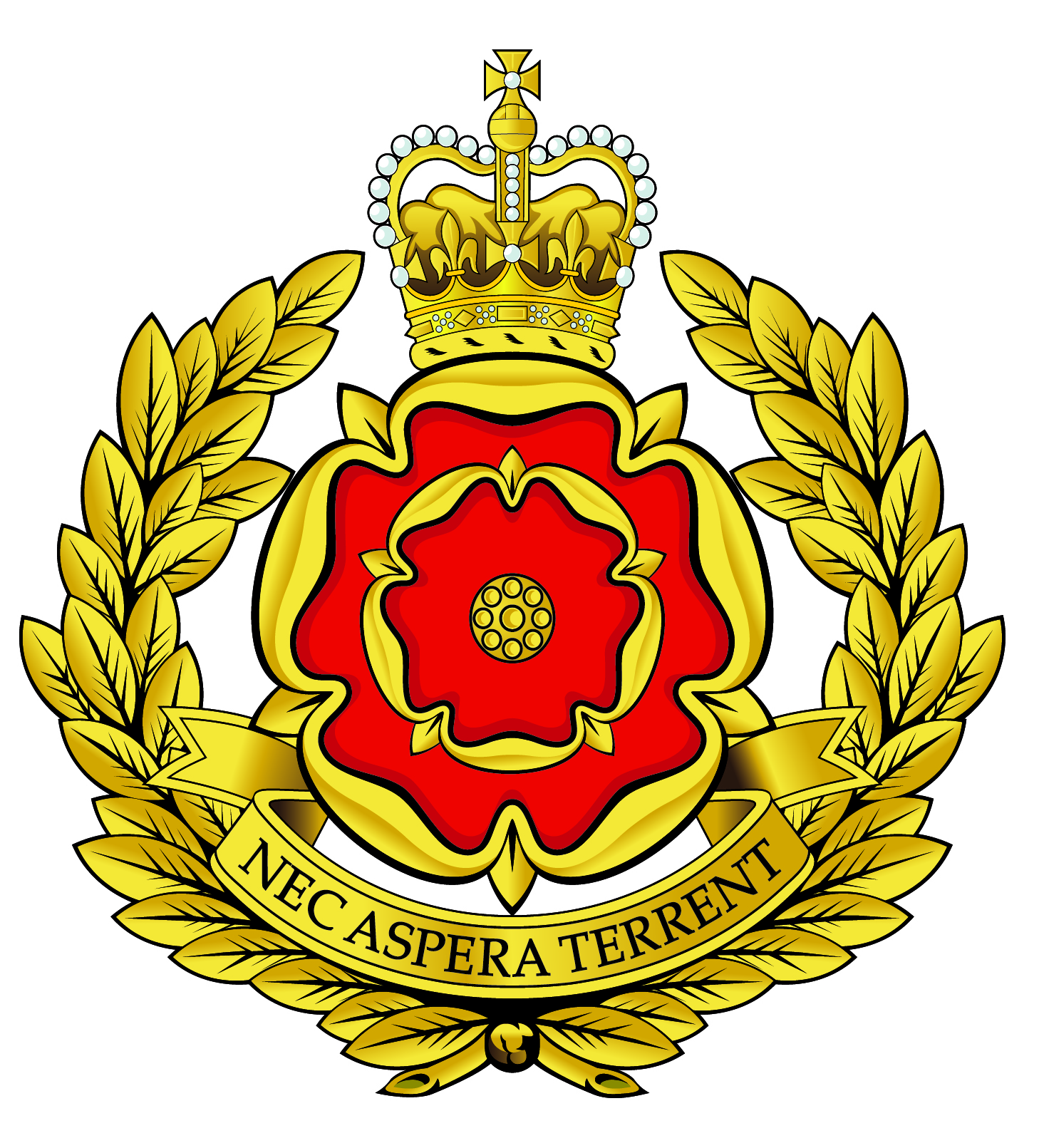
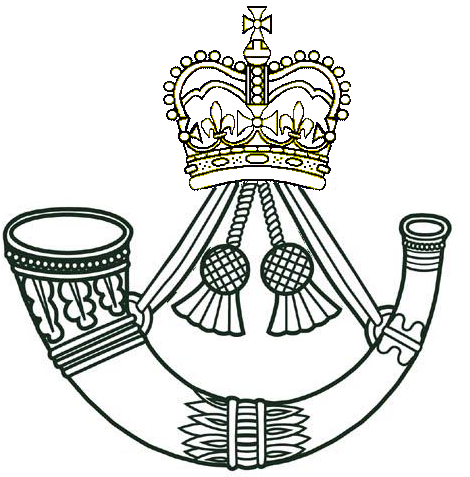
The Duke of Lancaster's Regiment (top) and The Rifles (bottom) were two of six brand new large regiments to be formed between March 2006 and September 2007

In 2004, the Army Board announced the ending of the "Arms Plot" system, where individual battalions changed role and moved station every 2 to 6 years. The Board argued that the existing system led to seven or eight battalions being unavailable at any time due to retraining while changing roles. The lack of stability for the families of soldiers due to constant moving of locations was also cited as a disadvantage. In the future, battalions would retain the same role and largely the same location. As part of this process, all infantry would be organised as large single cap badge regiments of two or more battalions; this would continue to allow soldiers the ability to undertake different roles through transferring between battalions of their regiment. At the same time, there was to be a reduction in the number of battalions, with amalgamations to take place within the administrative divisions created in 1968: The Scottish Division was to lose one battalion, the King's Division two and the Prince of Wales's Division one. (Note: Ultimately, the Prince of Wales's Division lost two battalions and the King's Division one) Each division was to consider one of two options:

- The "small/large" option of two (three in the case of the Queen's Division) regiments, each of two or three battalions. (Note: Similar to the structure used in the Royal Canadian Infantry Corps, which consisted of three regular army regiments each of three battalions)
- The "large/large" option of one regiment of four or more battalions. (Note: Similar to the structure used in the Royal Australian Infantry Corps, which consisted of a single regular infantry regiment of six battalions)

The results of the reorganisation, which were completed in September 2007, were:

The Scottish Division formed a single "large/large" regiment of five battalions, The Royal Regiment of Scotland, (Note: The amalgamation of the Scottish regiments proved an emotive issue, and led to the compromise of the names of the amalgamated regiments becoming the title of the new battalions, with each battalion's number being the subtitle – for example the full title of the 1st Battalion is "The Royal Scots Borderers, 1st Battalion Royal Regiment of Scotland", as opposed to "1st Battalion, The Royal Regiment of Scotland (Royal Scots Borderers)", the pattern adopted by the English and Welsh regiments.) on 28 March 2006 from:

- The Royal Scots (The Royal Regiment) (Note: Upon the formation of the Royal Regiment of Scotland, the Royal Scots and the King's Own Scottish Borderers were initially retained as separate unnumbered battalions of the new regiment. On 1 August 2006, the two were amalgamated to form a single battalion, named as the Royal Scots Borderers (which had been the original intention under Options for Change) and ranked as the 1st Battalion)
- The Royal Highland Fusiliers (Princess Margaret's Own Glasgow and Ayrshire Regiment) – 2nd Battalion
- The King's Own Scottish Borderers
- The Black Watch (Royal Highland Regiment) – 3rd Battalion
- The Highlanders (Seaforth, Gordons and Camerons) – 4th Battalion
- The Argyll & Sutherland Highlanders (Princess Louise's) – 5th Battalion

The Queen's Division adopted the "small/large" option, retaining the three existing regiments with two regular battalions each:

- The Princess of Wales's Royal Regiment (Queen's and Royal Hampshires)
- The Royal Regiment of Fusiliers
- The Royal Anglian Regiment

The King's Division also adopted the "small/large" option:

- The Duke of Lancaster's Regiment (King's, Lancashire and Border) was formed on 1 July 2006 (initially of three battalions, reduced to two in March 2007) from:
  - The King's Own Royal Border Regiment – 3rd Battalion (Note: 3rd Battalion, Duke of Lancaster's Regiment was disbanded on 31 March 2007)
  - The King's Regiment – 2nd Battalion
  - The Queen's Lancashire Regiment – 1st Battalion
- The Yorkshire Regiment (14th/15th, 19th and 33rd/76th Foot) was formed on 6 June 2006 from:
  - The Prince of Wales's Own Regiment of Yorkshire – 1st Battalion
  - The Green Howards (Alexandra, Princess of Wales's Own Yorkshire Regiment) – 2nd Battalion
  - The Duke of Wellington's Regiment (West Riding) – 3rd Battalion

The Prince of Wales' Division formed two "small/large" regiments:

- The Royal Welsh was formed on 1 March 2006 from:
  - The Royal Welch Fusiliers – 1st Battalion
  - The Royal Regiment of Wales (24th/41st Foot) – 2nd Battalion
- The Mercian Regiment formed with 3 regular battalions on 1 September 2007 from:
  - The 22nd (Cheshire) Regiment – 1st Battalion
  - The Worcestershire and Sherwood Foresters Regiment (29th/45th Foot) – 2nd Battalion
  - The Staffordshire Regiment (The Prince of Wales's) – 3rd Battalion
- In addition the Devonshire and Dorset Regiment and Royal Gloucestershire, Berkshire and Wiltshire Regiment were transferred to the Light Division in 2005 and renamed as light infantry.

The Light Division was initially going to follow the "small/large" route, with the Royal Green Jackets retaining two battalions, and The Light Infantry gaining a third by amalgamating with the Devonshire and Dorset Regiment and the Royal Gloucestershire, Berkshire and Wiltshire Regiment. (Note: The initial proposal would have seen the de-amalgamation of the Royal Gloucestershire, Berkshire and Wiltshire Regiment into its former components, with the Gloucestershire element to amalgamate with the Devonshire and Dorset Regiment and the Light Infantry, and the former Berkshire and Wiltshire element merging with the Princess of Wales's Royal Regiment.) However, the four regiments then took the decision to form a single five-battalion "large/large" regiment, The Rifles on 1 February 2007:

- The Devonshire and Dorset Light Infantry (Note: The Devonshire and Dorset Light Infantry, and Royal Gloucestershire, Berkshire and Wiltshire Light Infantry amalgamated to form the single 1st Battalion)
- The Light Infantry (Note: 1st and 2nd Battalions, The Light Infantry were renamed as the 5th and 3rd Battalions respectively)
- The Royal Gloucestershire, Berkshire and Wiltshire Light Infantry
- The Royal Green Jackets (Note: 1st and 2nd Battalions, Royal Green Jackets were renamed as 2nd and 4th Battalions respectively)

Additionally, The Royal Irish Regiment (27th (Inniskilling), 83rd, 87th and Ulster Defence Regiment), as a result of the end of the Provisional IRA's armed campaign in 2005, saw its three Home Service battalions disbanded in July 2007, leaving just the single regular general service battalion. (Note: The original seven Home Service battalions of the Royal Irish Regiment when it was formed in 1992 had been reduced by amalgamations to three by 2003) The Parachute Regiment, although ostensibly unaffected by the reforms, saw its 1st Battalion removed from the infantry order of battle and transferred to the control of the United Kingdom Special Forces to form the core element of the tri-service Special Forces Support Group. (Note: While the majority of the personnel within the SFSG come from 1 PARA, the unit also features personnel from the Royal Marines and the RAF Regiment.)

Each regiment within the new structure also gained at least one Territorial Army (TA) battalion through amalgamating with its local multi-cap badge TA regiment. The two large/large regiments gained two TA battalions. (Note: The multi-badge regiments so amalgamated were the Tyne-Tees Regiment, East and West Riding Regiment, 51st Highland Regiment, 52nd Lowland Regiment, Royal Welsh Regiment, West Midlands Regiment, Royal Irish Rangers, Lancastrian and Cumbrian Volunteers, East of England Regiment, Rifle Volunteers, Royal Rifle Volunteers and King's and Cheshire Regiment. Only the London Regiment was retained as a separate TA regiment.) (Note: The Princess of Wales's Royal Regiment already had a numbered TA battalion, the 3rd(V) Battalion, as part of its Order of Battle) (Note: The Parachute Regiment already had a numbered TA battalion, the 4th(V) Battalion, as part of its Order of Battle)

The Guards Division (Note: Although the five regiments of foot guards were left unreformed as single battalions, the Guards Division did receive for the first time a TA unit in the form of the London Regiment) and the Royal Gurkha Rifles were left unreformed.

== Army 2020 ==
As part of the 2010 Strategic Defence and Security Review, the British Army would be restructured and reduced in size, including the reduction of the infantry by a total of two battalions. One of the results of this was that two of the existing large regiments were reduced to a single battalion each, while the other "small/large" regiments were all reduced to two battalions, with each retaining their existing reserve battalions.

- The Royal Regiment of Scotland was reduced from five battalions to four, with the reduction of the 5th Battalion to a single company.
- The Yorkshire Regiment (14th/15th, 19th and 33rd/76th Foot) had its 2nd Battalion disbanded, reducing it to two battalions (Note: The remaining two battalions were renumbered, with the 1st Battalion becoming the 2nd Battalion, and the 3rd Battalion assuming its place as the 1st Battalion) (Note: The Yorkshire Regiment was granted a "royal" title in April 2023, being renamed as the Royal Yorkshire Reigment (14th/15th, 19th and 33rd/76th Foot))
- The Mercian Regiment had its 3rd Battalion disbanded, reducing it to two battalions (Note: The 3rd Battalion had been the former Staffordshire Regiment. To perpetuate the Staffords name, the Mercian Regiment's name was changed to Mercian Regiment (Cheshire, Worcesters & Foresters, and Staffords))
- The Royal Regiment of Fusiliers was reduced to a single battalion
- The Royal Welsh was reduced to a single battalion

Two regiments, the Princess of Wales's Royal Regiment and the Rifles, each received an additional reserve battalion. The Royal Gurkha Rifles, as part of an overall expansion of the Brigade of Gurkhas, was to raise a third battalion

== Future Soldier ==
The Rangers was formed from four of the existing Specialised infantry battalions

In March 2021, the government published a new defence review, entitled Defence in a Competitive Age, that was undertaken as part of the larger Integrated Review into the UK's foreign, defence and security policies. This would entail a reorganisation of the infantry's divisional administrative structure, as part of which, another of the large regiments originally formed under Future Infantry Structure in 2007, the Mercian Regiment, was reduced to a single regular battalion. Further changes were announced relating to the so-called "specialised infantry" battalions formed under the 2015 SDSR, with their operational formation, the Specialised Infantry Group, to be regimented as a new large regiment, dubbed the "Ranger Regiment", initially intended to be formed in August 2021 as part of a new "Special Operations Brigade": (Note: The new regiment was initially formed by "seeding" personnel from four of the battalions from the Specialised Infantry Group. Over time, additional personnel will join the regiment from other branches of the British Army to create fully all-arms units.) On 25 November 2021, the new plan for the restructuring of the Army, which was entitled Future Soldier, was announced. The most significant announcement was the formation of the planned new regiment, The Rangers, from four of the five battalions of the Specialised Infantry Group:

- The Rangers – formed 1 December 2021 from: (Note: Each of the battalions of the Rangers will be attached to one of the revised infantry divisions that were also announced as part of Future Soldier – the Guards and Parachute Division, Queen's Division, Union Division and Light Division.)
  - The Royal Scots Borderers, 1st Battalion The Royal Regiment of Scotland – 1st Battalion
  - 2nd Battalion, The Princess of Wales's Royal Regiment (Queen's and Royal Hampshires) – 2nd Battalion
  - 2nd Battalion, The Duke of Lancaster's Regiment (King's, Lancashire and Border) – 3rd Battalion
  - 4th Battalion, The Rifles – 4th Battalion

The reformation of the fifth battalion in the Specialised Infantry Group, 3rd Battalion, the Royal Gurkha Rifles, was cancelled, leaving the regiment with two battalions. Instead, individual company sized units were formed intended to operate across the army, including attached to The Rangers. (Note: Coriano Company was formed on 31 January 2020 as part of the reformation of the 3rd Battalion. The company was initially attached to 4 RIFLES after its formation, pending the raising of the rest of 3 RGR. A second company, Falklands Company, was formed on 18 November 2021, by which time the decision to form a new battalion had been reversed, with the new company attached to 2 PWRR (later 2 RANGERS). A third company, Krithia Company, was raised in April 2024 to be attached to 1 RANGERS.)

Following the original announcement in March that the Mercian Regiment would be reduced to a single regular battalion, the formation of The Rangers, a brand new regiment with its own cap badge, saw a further two large regiments, the Princess of Wales's Royal Regiment and the Duke of Lancaster's Regiment, also reduced in size to a single regular battalion, while the Royal Regiment of Scotland was reduced to three regular battalions and The Rifles to four. In addition, although the Foot Guards battalion assigned to the "Security Force Assistance" role was reduced in size, its excess manpower was used to generate two additional public duties companies. The first battalion to be so formed was 1st Battalion, Irish Guards, which generated No 9 Company and No 12 Company for public duties. These two companies will be used to represent the 2nd Battalion, Irish Guards, which was originally placed in suspended animation in 1947. (Note: The remaining large regiments in the infantry following Future Soldier were The Royal Regiment of Scotland (3 regular battalions + 1 reinforced company); The Rifles (4 regular battalions); The Royal Anglian Regiment (2 regular battalions); The Royal Yorkshire Regiment (2 regular battalions); The Parachute Regiment (3 regular battalions); and The Royal Gurkha Rifles (2 regular battalions + 3 companies)) (Note: The Grenadier Guards, Coldstream Guards and Scots Guards all retained their existing structure of a single regular battalion and a reinforced public duties company) (Note: Future Soldier additionally saw the individual companies of the London Regiment rebadged as companies of four of the Foot Guards regiments, formed into a single battalion renamed as 1st Battalion, London Guards)
