= 1st Battalion, Ulster Defence Regiment =

Military unit

1st Battalion Ulster Defence Regiment
- Ulster Defence Regiment insignia
- Active: 1970–1992
- Country: United Kingdom
- Branch: British Army
- Type: Infantry battalion
- Role: Internal Security
- Size: 750
- Regimental Headquarters: Lisburn
- Mottos: "Quis Separabit" (Latin) "Who Shall Separate Us?"
- March: Quick: Garryowen & Sprig of Shillelagh; Slow: Oft in the Stilly Night

Commanders
- Colonel of the Regiment: Colonel Sir Dennis Faulkner CBE
- Notable commanders: First: General Sir John Anderson GBE, KCB, DSO; Last: General Sir Charles Huxtable, KCB, CBE, DL

1st (County Antrim) Battalion, Ulster Defence Regiment (1 UDR) was formed in 1970 as part of the 7 original battalions specified in The Ulster Defence Regiment Act 1969, which received Royal Assent on 18 December 1969 and was brought into force on 1 January 1970. It was amalgamated with the 9th Battalion, Ulster Defence Regiment in 1984 to form the 1st/9th Battalion, Ulster Defence Regiment.

== History ==
Along with the other six original battalions, 1 UDR commenced operational duties on 1 April 1970.

The first training major (TISO) was Major G.D. Issac of the Royal Regiment of Wales, who established battalion headquarters at the Depot Royal Irish Rangers, Ballymena. Where possible accommodation was sought in army bases, as although the old Ulster Special Constabulary (its most notable division being the 'B-Specials') platoon huts were vacant and available, to have used those would have highlighted the 42% continuity in personnel between the Specials and the UDR.

One of the first major interventions by the battalion was to, along with elements of the 3rd Battalion, provide support for 7 UDR in implementing the deployment of 31 vehicle checkpoints on all main roads leading into Belfast to prevent the movement of munitions into the city centre. This was mainly done at weekends so that the part-time soldiers could be used day and night.

The battalion responded to a general call-out in August 1971 to support regular troops during the first internment sweep of the Troubles. In total, the entire regiment managed to provide 3,100 men during the call-out.

During the 1974 Ulster Workers' Council strike, the regiment was placed on general call-out. Forty drivers from 1 UDR, 9 UDR and 10 UDR were drafted into Belfast to assist the Royal Corps of Transport. Over nine days, they logged up 15,000 miles (24,000 km) in the process of delivering rations and supplies to military units throughout Northern Ireland, as well as meeting troop reinforcements arriving at Belfast docks and transporting them to their temporary camps.

=== Early operations ===
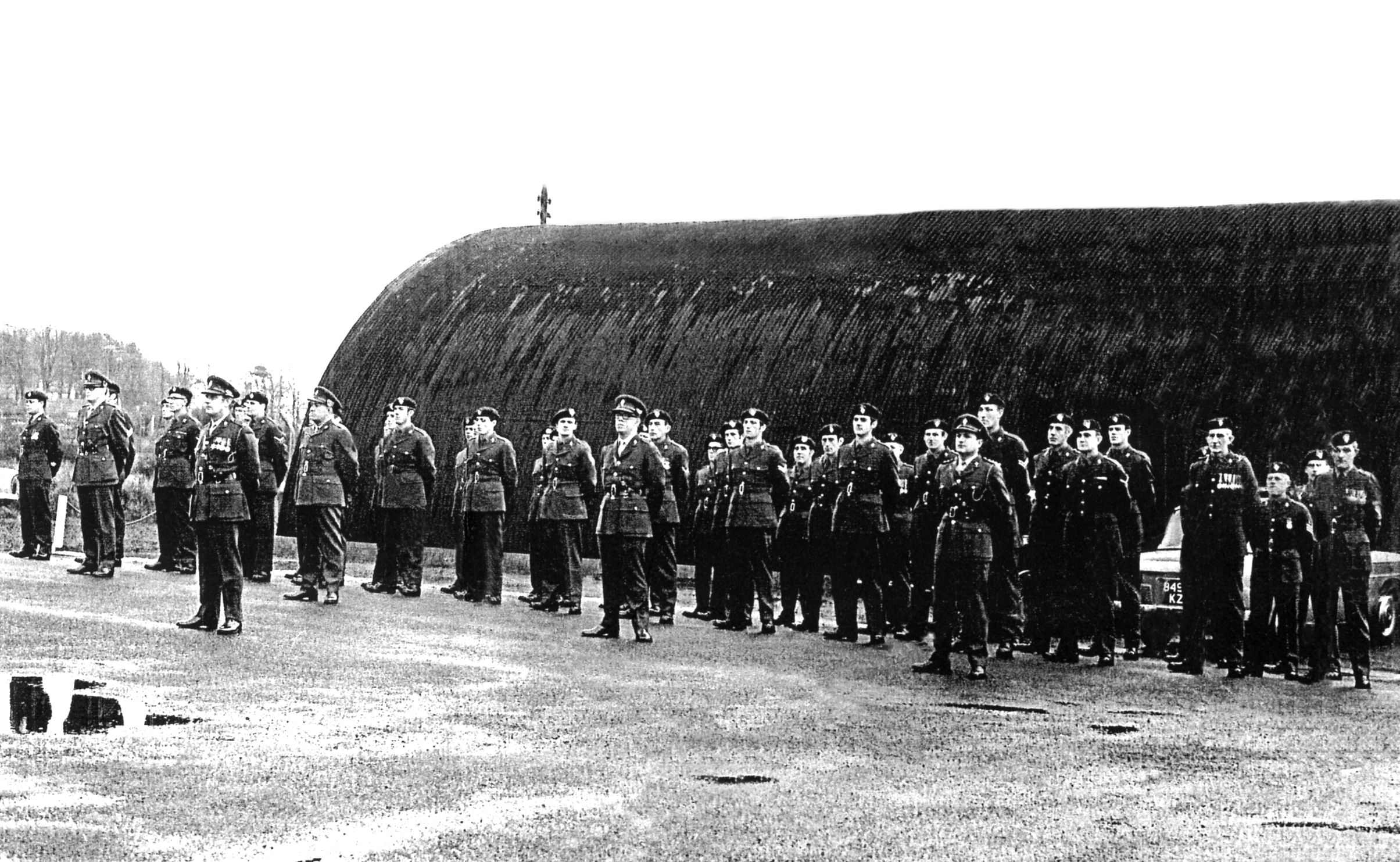
C Company, 1 UDR on parade at Steeple Camp, Antrim, Remembrance Sunday 1970.

The experience of 1 UDR was the same as that of all battalions of the regiment in the early days. Because of equipment shortages patrols had to be carried out in private cars or in vehicles borrowed from other army units. Instead of torches, patrols carried Hurricane Lamps which had to be lit by hand. These were eventually replaced by the Bardic torches carried by the regular army.

The 9th (Country Antrim) Battalion was formed on 15 December 1971 from the companies of 1 UDR who were based in the southern half of Country Antrim.

=== Intelligence ===
Intelligence gathering within 1 UDR was good. The local community responded well and in particular, Catholics were keen to warn individual soldiers of threats to their lives or to phone information through to the barracks advising of potential "happenings" in the battalion area.

== Structure ==
Company dispositions: BHQ HQ Coy & A Coy - Ballymena; B Coy – Ballymoney; C Coy – Antrim; D Coy – Lisburn; E Coy – Larne

=== B Company ===
B Company was formed in March 1970, in the former North Irish Horse barracks at John Street, Ballymoney. The first Officer Commanding (OC) was Major John Munnis, formerly the sub-district commander of the Ulster Special Constabulary (USC). Major Munnis was killed in a traffic accident in 1972. The Company sergeant major was WO2 Willy Mooney who had been a sergeant instructor with the same USC unit.

Soldiers in B Company were mostly drawn from the towns and villages of North Antrim such as: Ballymoney, Ballycastle, Bushmills and Dervock. There was a high number of recruits who had been USC men (B Specials) who joined from these areas too, as well as from the village of Stranocum, although incidents of men joining in other groups such as from the same workforce or as neighbours were few.

Entire families joined together and this created problems in dividing them up on patrol. There was a fear that two or more members of the same family could be killed or wounded if they were together in the same vehicle which was under attack.

In late 1970 a new company was raised in Coleraine as part of 5 UDR and forty experienced soldiers from B Company volunteered to transfer.

Because the company base contained the only secure armoury in the area soldiers from Coleraine, Portrush and Portstewart were also based in nearby Henry Street, Ballymoney.

In 1983 B Company was transferred to the command of 5 UDR and renamed G Coy, 5 UDR, but remained in the John Street base. The base finally closed in 1992 after further restructuring in 5 UDR.

== Greenfinches ==
See: Women's UDR

== Casualties ==
1 UDR was unique in the regiment being the only battalion which suffered no casualties as a result of enemy action.

== Notable personnel ==
- Category:Ulster Defence Regiment soldiers
- Category:Ulster Defence Regiment officers

== See also ==
- Ulster Defence Regiment
- List of battalions and locations of the Ulster Defence Regiment

== Bibliography ==
- Gamble, Ronnie. My Service Life, 1939–1979: William (Bill) Balmer, 2009, Causeway Museum Service, ISBN 978-0-9552286-4-3
- Potter, John Furniss. A Testimony to Courage – the Regimental History of the Ulster Defence Regiment 1969–1992, Pen & Sword Books Ltd, 2001, ISBN 0-85052-819-4
- Ryder, Chris. The Ulster Defence Regiment: An Instrument of Peace?, 1991 ISBN 0-413-64800-1
