= 1st/9th Battalion, Ulster Defence Regiment =

Infantry battalion in the British Army

1st/9th (County Antrim) Battalion Ulster Defence Regiment
- Ulster Defence Regiment insignia
- Active: 1972-1991
- Country: United Kingdom
- Branch: British Army
- Type: Infantry battalion
- Role: Internal Security
- Size: 756
- Regimental Headquarters: Lisburn
- Mottos: "Quis Separabit" (Latin) "Who Shall Separate Us?"
- March: (Quick) Garryowen & Sprig of Shillelagh. (Slow) Oft in the Stilly Night

Commanders
- Colonel Commandant: First: General Sir John Anderson GBE, KCB, DSO; Last: General Sir Charles Huxtable, KCB, CBE, DL
- Colonel of the Regiment: Colonel Sir Dennis Faulkner CBE

The 1st/9th (County Antrim) Battalion, Ulster Defence Regiment was formed in 1984 as a result of an amalgamation between the 1st Battalion Ulster Defence Regiment and the 9th Battalion Ulster Defence Regiment.

The amalgamated battalion was the largest in the British Army.

== Formation ==
The formation of the merged battalion was carried out on 20 May 1984, and was done as result of the Royal Ulster Constabulary's territorial reorganisation. In order to keep their own organisation closely linked to that of the police the UDR carried out its own reorganisation.

== History ==
Battalion HQ in Antrim became the headquarters of the new battalion with companies based at Antrim, Larne, Carrickfergus and Ballymena.

The Coleraine company was transferred to 5UDR and the Lisburn company to 11UDR.

1/9 UDR was responsible for the 700 square mile territory comprising South and mid-Antrim, taking in 153 square miles of Lough Neagh.

1/9 UDR was one of the units merged with the Royal Irish Rangers in 1992 as part of the amalgamation which formed the Royal Irish Regiment.

== Uniform, armament & equipment ==
See: Ulster Defence Regiment Uniform, armament & equipment

== Notable personnel ==
- Category:Ulster Defence Regiment soldiers
- Category:Ulster Defence Regiment officers

== See also ==
- The Ulster Defence Regiment
- List of battalions and locations of the Ulster Defence Regiment

== Bibliography ==
- A Testimony to Courage – the Regimental History of the Ulster Defence Regiment 1969 – 1992, John Potter, Pen & Sword Books Ltd, 2001, ISBN 0-85052-819-4
- The Ulster Defence Regiment: An Instrument of Peace?, Chris Ryder 1991 ISBN 0-413-64800-1
