= 8th Battalion, Ulster Defence Regiment =

Military unit

8th (County Tyrone) Battalion, Ulster Defence Regiment
- Regimental Insignia
- Active: 1971–1992
- Country: United Kingdom
- Branch: British Army
- Type: Infantry battalion
- Role: Internal Security
- Size: 750
- Regimental Headquarters: Lisburn
- Mottos: "Quis Separabit" (Latin) "Who Shall Separate Us?"
- March: (Quick) Garryowen & Sprig of Shillelagh. (Slow) Oft in the Stilly Night

Commanders
- Colonel Commandant: First: General Sir John Anderson GBE, KCB, DSO. Last: General Sir Charles Huxtable, KCB, CBE, DL
- Colonel of the Regiment: Colonel Sir Dennis Faulkner CBE

The 8th (County Tyrone) Battalion, Ulster Defence Regiment was formed on 1 December 1971 using companies, based in the east of the county, of the 6th Battalion Ulster Defence Regiment. It was, along with the rest of the regiment, subsumed into the Royal Irish Rangers in 1992 to form the Royal Irish Regiment.

== History ==
Battalion HQ was based at Killymeal House, Dungannon, which was also home for the Commanding Officer and his family. The operations room was located in the stables. 5 companies were dispersed between Killymeal House and the rest of the battalion area.

The first commanding officer was Lieutenant Colonel John Blackwell of the Royal Tank Regiment.

On 7 November 1974, a gunman hijacked a van with its driver. A 500 pounds (230 kg) bomb was placed in the van and the driver ordered to take it to the local UDR base, which was J Company, 8 UDR. This was known in the terminology of the time as a proxy bomb. The base was prepared for such an attack, as were most bases. When the van arrived at their base, a sergeant from J Company grabbed his SMG and forced the van driver to put his vehicle into what was known as a "Critpit" (named after its originator, Colonel I.R. Critchley, (Black Watch), deputy commander of 3 Infantry Brigade. The Critpit was a deep pit, large enough to hold a lorry, and lined with sandbags. The bomb exploded less than an hour later but the only damage done was a few shattered windows in the base and surrounding area.

== Casualties ==
The first soldier from the new battalion was killed on 7 December 1971. Lance Corporal Dennis Wilson, aged 31 J Company) had taken to his bed at home with a cold. At 10:30 pm, three armed men forced entry to his farmhouse near Caledon, County Tyrone, 300 yards from the border with the Republic of Ireland. One of them held his family at gunpoint in a downstairs room whilst the other two went upstairs and killed him.

=== Notable personnel ===
- Category:Ulster Defence Regiment soldiers
- Category:Ulster Defence Regiment officers

== See also ==
- Ulster Defence Regiment
- List of battalions and locations of the Ulster Defence Regiment

== Bibliography ==
- A Testimony to Courage – the Regimental History of the Ulster Defence Regiment 1969 – 1992, John Potter, Pen & Sword Books Ltd, 2001, ISBN 0-85052-819-4
- The Ulster Defence Regiment: An Instrument of Peace?, Chris Ryder 1991 ISBN 0-413-64800-1
