= 4th/6th Battalion, Ulster Defence Regiment =

Military unit

4th/6th (County Fermanagh & Country Tyrone) Battalion, Ulster Defence Regiment
- Regimental Insignia
- Active: 1991–1992
- Country: United Kingdom
- Branch: British Army
- Type: Infantry battalion
- Role: Internal Security
- Size: 750
- Regimental Headquarters: Lisburn
- Mottos: "Quis Separabit" (Latin) "Who Shall Separate Us?"
- March: (Quick) Garryowen & Sprig of Shillelagh. (Slow) Oft in the Stilly Night

Commanders
- Colonel Commandant: First: General Sir John Anderson GBE, KCB, DSO. Last: General Sir Charles Huxtable, KCB, CBE, DL
- Colonel of the Regiment: Colonel Sir Dennis Faulkner CBE

The 4th/6th (County Fermanagh and County Tyrone) Battalion, Ulster Defence Regiment was formed in 1991 as a result of an amalgamation between the 4th Battalion, Ulster Defence Regiment and the 6th Battalion, Ulster Defence Regiment. The resultant 4/6 UDR was subsumed into the Royal Irish Rangers in 1992 as part of the amalgamation which formed the Royal Irish Regiment.

== Uniform, armament & equipment ==
See: Ulster Defence Regiment Uniform, armament & equipment

== Notable personnel ==
- Category:Ulster Defence Regiment soldiers
- Category:Ulster Defence Regiment officers

== See also ==
- Ulster Defence Regiment
- List of battalions and locations of the Ulster Defence Regiment

== Bibliography ==
- A Testimony to Courage – the Regimental History of the Ulster Defence Regiment 1969 – 1992, John Potter, Pen & Sword Books Ltd, 2001, ISBN 0-85052-819-4
- The Ulster Defence Regiment: An Instrument of Peace?, Chris Ryder 1991 ISBN 0-413-64800-1
- Lost Lives, David McKittrick, Mainstream, 2004, ISBN 184018504X
