= 9th Battalion, Ulster Defence Regiment =

Military unit

9th (County Antrim) Battalion Ulster Defence Regiment
- Ulster Defence regiment crest
- Active: 1972–1984
- Country: United Kingdom
- Branch: British Army
- Type: Infantry battalion
- Role: Internal Security
- Size: 750
- Regimental Headquarters: Lisburn
- Mottos: "Quis Separabit" (Latin) "Who Shall Separate Us?"
- March: (Quick) Garryowen & Sprig of Shillelagh. (Slow) Oft in the Stilly Night

Commanders
- Colonel Commandant: First: General Sir John Anderson GBE, KCB, DSO. Last: General Sir Charles Huxtable, KCB, CBE, DL
- Colonel of the Regiment: Colonel Sir Dennis Faulkner CBE

The 9th (County Antrim) Battalion, Ulster Defence Regiment was formed in 1972 from two companies of the 1st Battalion Ulster Defence Regiment creating a second battalion in County Antrim. It was amalgamated with 1 UDR in 1984 to form 1/9 UDR.

== History ==
The battalion was formed in 1972 from the two companies of the 1st Battalion Ulster Defence Regiment who were based in the south of the county, creating a second battalion in County Antrim. Battalion headquarters, HQ Company and one other were based at Steeple Camp, Antrim, a remnant of World War II beside the railway station. Two companies were based in Lisburn and one at Carrickfergus.

The first commanding officer was Lieutenant Colonel "Paddy" Liddle who had previously been a part-time company commander with the 1st (County Antrim) Battalion. Liddle has seen wartime service with the Royal Ulster Rifles and had attended Army Staff College. He was the only UDR officer to be promoted into battalion command.

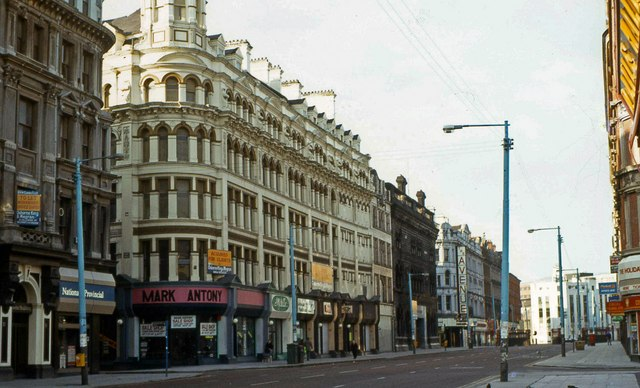
The Grand Central Hotel, used as accommodation by 9 UDR

The battalion was mobilised, along with the rest of the regiment, for Operation Motorman. The UDR provided 5300 soldiers in support of the regular army. After this there was a battalion mobilisation of 9 UDR to help guard the new Belfast city centre segment. This was a zone in the commercial heart of Belfast where 41 streets had been sealed off with barbed wire entanglements and steel fences to prevent explosives being brought in. No cars could be parked there and all shoppers and workers entering the few open streets being searched. Accommodation was found for them in the former Grand Central Hotel in Royal Avenue which was being used as an army base for the city centre.

== Uniform, armament & equipment ==
See: Ulster Defence Regiment Uniform, armament & equipment

== Casualties ==
Lance Corporal L. Colin Houston, aged 30, was killed at his home in Dunmurry by gunmen from the Irish National Liberation Army on 20 January 1984. Lance Corporal Houston died in his wife's arms. He had only recently joined the training team at the UDR's Ballykinlar Training Camp.

== Notable personnel ==
- Category:Ulster Defence Regiment soldiers
- Category:Ulster Defence Regiment officers

== See also ==
- List of battalions and locations of the Ulster Defence Regiment

== Bibliography ==
- A Testimony to Courage – the Regimental History of the Ulster Defence Regiment 1969 – 1992, John Potter, Pen & Sword Books Ltd, 2001, ISBN 0-85052-819-4
- The Ulster Defence Regiment: An Instrument of Peace?, Chris Ryder 1991 ISBN 0-413-64800-1
- Lost Lives, David McKittrick, Mainstream, 2004, ISBN 184018504X
