= List of battalions and locations of the Ulster Defence Regiment =

Ulster Defence Regiment CGC
- Active: 1970–1992
- Country: United Kingdom
- Branch: British Army
- Type: Infantry Regiment
- Role: Internal Security
- Size: 11 battalions (at peak)
- Regimental Headquarters: Lisburn (1992)
- Mottos: "Quis Separabit" (Latin) "Who Shall Separate Us?"
- March: (Quick) Garryowen & Sprig of Shillelagh. (Slow) Oft in the Stilly Night

Commanders
- Colonel in Chief: General Sir John Anderson GBE, KCB, DSO
- Colonel of the Regiment: Colonel Sir Dennis Faulkner CBE

Ulster Defence Regiment battalions were located throughout Northern Ireland. The bases were a mix of regimental, battalion, company and platoon locations.

== Regimental headquarters ==
HQUDR was based at Thiepval Barracks, Lisburn. This location was also home to the 39 Infantry Brigade (39 Bde) and Headquarters Northern Ireland (HQNI).

== Training centre ==
The UDR's main training centre was located at Ballykinlar Army Base where the battalion headquarters of the 3rd (County Down) Battalion were also situated.

== Battalion locations ==
Name	Active	Bases
Headquarters	1970–1992	Thiepval Barracks, Lisburn
1st (County Antrim) Battalion	1970–1984	BHQ HQ Coy & A Coy – Ballymena; B Coy – Ballymoney; C Coy – Antrim; D Coy – Lisburn; E Coy – Larne
1st/9th (County Antrim) Battalion	1984–1992	BHQ, HQ Coy, Antrim; A Coy, B Coy, G Coy, Ballymena; C Coy, D Coy, Antrim; E Coy, Larne/Carrickfergus, F Coy, Carrickfergus
2nd (County Armagh) Battalion	1970–1991	Drumadd Barracks, Armagh (replaced Gough Barracks which was taken over by the RUC); Loughall UDR Barracks; Glenane Barracks (destroyed in an IRA attack); Newtownhamilton RUC Station
2nd/11th (County Armagh) Battalion	1991–1992	Mahon Road Barracks, Portadown. Drumadd Barracks, Armagh.
3rd (County Down) Battalion	1970–1992	Ballykinlar; The Abbey, Kilkeel; Rathfriland UDR Barracks; Newry; Saintfield
4th (County Fermanagh) Battalion	1970–1991	Grosvenor Barracks, Enniskillen; Lisnaskea; Monea; St Angelo
4th/6th (County Fermanagh and County Tyrone) Battalion	1991–1992	
5th (County Londonderry) Battalion	1970–1992	Ballykelly; Derry; Ballymoney; Magherafelt; Maghera RUC Station; Coleraine; Garvagh RUC Station; Macosquin
6th (County Tyrone) Battalion	1970–1991	St Lucia Barracks, Omagh; The Deanery, Clogher; Castlederg; Strabane
7th (Belfast) Battalion	1970–1984	Palace Barracks; Newtownards, Ladas Drive, Belfast
7th/10th (City of Belfast) Battalion	1984–1992	Palace Barracks; Grand Central Hotel, Royal Avenue, Belfast, Newtownards, Ladas Drive, Belfast
8th (County Tyrone) Battalion	1971–1992	Killymeal House, Dungannon; Cookstown UDR Barracks; Aughnacloy;
9th (Country Antrim) Battalion	1972–1984	BHQ, HQ Coy, C Coy, Steeple Hill, Antrim; A Coy, F Coy, Carrickfergus; B Coy, D Coy, Lisburn; E Coy, Ballyclare
10th (City of Belfast) Battalion	1972–1984	Malone Road, Belfast; Carryduff
11th (Craigavon) Battalion	1972–1991	BHQ, A Coy, B Coy, E Coy, Mahon Barracks, Portadown; C Coy, Kitchen Hill Barracks, Lurgan; D Coy, Scarva Road Barracks, Banbridge; F Coy, Thiepval Barracks, Lisburn

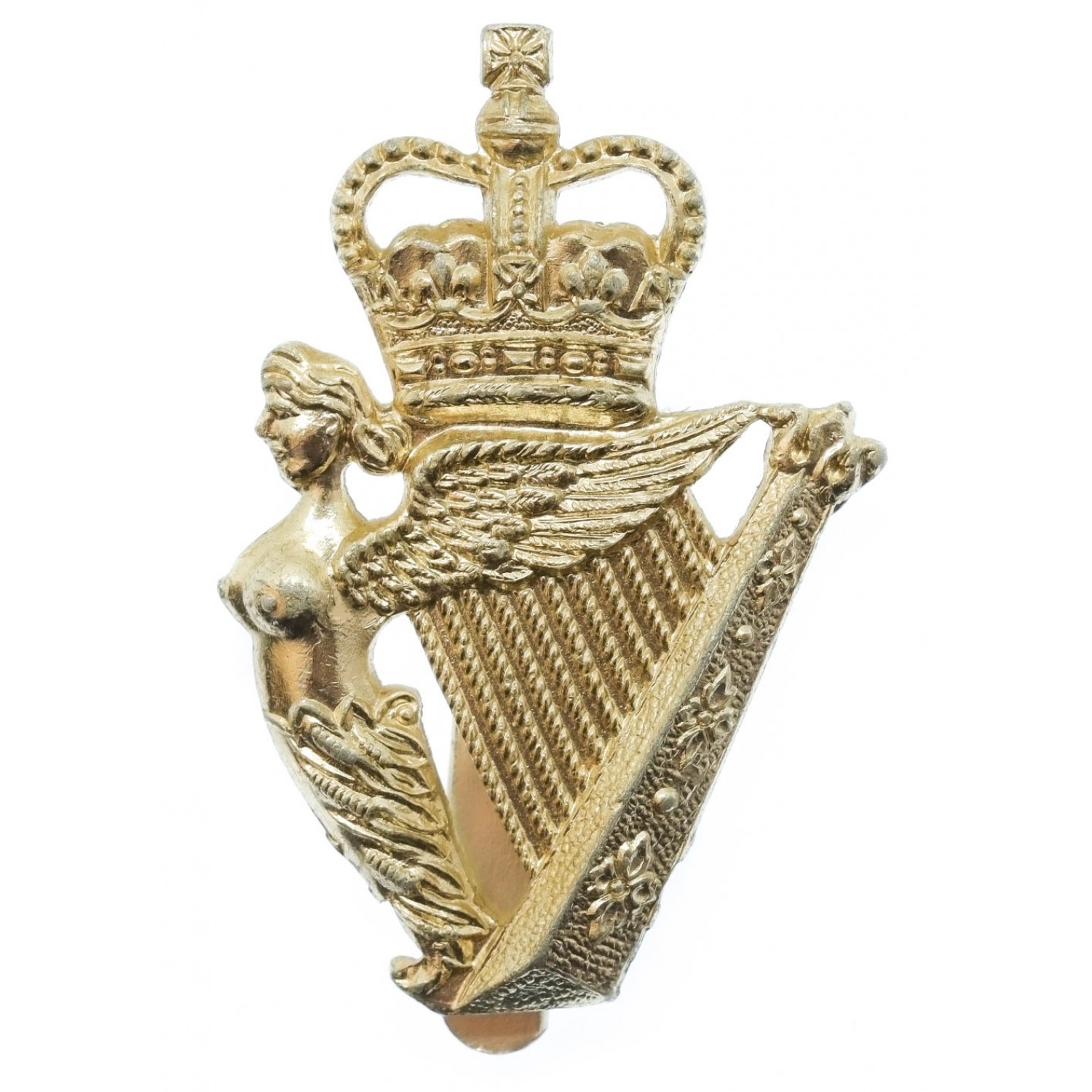

The regiment was reduced to nine battalions in 1984, then to seven in 1991. 9th (County Antrim) Battalion was formed in 1972 from two companies of the 1st Battalion. As part of the Options for Change review, it was amalgamated with 1 UDR again in 1991.

== Battalion dispersals ==
The dispersal of UDR soldiers into their areas of responsibility was through sub-barracks, as illustrated in the table below, which could hold several companies or perhaps just a platoon. Battalion Headquarters would be located in a major town (usually the county town but not always as some counties had two Battalions). Guarded by a permanent cadre of soldiers these barracks would become doubly active after 6 p.m. as part-time soldiers arrived for evening duties. After Ulsterisation began in 1976 many battalion headquarters eventually had full-sized permanent cadre companies attached and these would maintain a 24-hour presence in the battalion's Tactical Area of Responsibility. In each battalion area, sub headquarters units would maintain direct contact with their own men and Battalion HQ by radio. In many cases, the radios were operated by Greenfinches whose husbands or sons were out on patrol. This led to tense moments when mobile units or foot patrols came under attack and submitted a "contact report" (contact with the enemy) by radio.

An example of this structure can be seen in the make-up of 2 UDR based at Drummad Barracks in Armagh:

Company	Part/Full-time	Base	Hours of duty	Number on duty
HQ Coy	Mixed	Armagh, Command, Control & Admin	Admin 9-5, Watchkeepers 24 hr	9-5 = 15, 24hr = 5
A Coy	Full-time	Armagh	24	35
B Coy	Part-time	Armagh/Newtownhamilton/Caledon	7pm – 2am	35
C Coy	Part-time	Glenanne	7pm – 2am	35
D Coy	Part-time	Loughgall	7pm – 2am	35

== County connections ==
The raising of citizen militias has a history in Ireland stretching back to the creation of the Irish Militia in 1793. The Militia itself was officially disbanded in 1908 and replaced with the Territorial Force (in Ireland, it was called the Special Reserve and, after the Great War, the Supplementary Reserve), which later became the Territorial Army.

Some battalions of the Irish Militia remained on the Army list (in name only) until 1953 as part of the Territorial Army; The 5th Royal Inniskilling Fusiliers: 6th Royal Ulster Rifles and 5th Royal Irish Fusiliers.

The raising of the Ulster Defence Regiment followed the practice of raising citizen militias in Ireland for two reasons:

- it was raised as a home defence force with its battalions based in the counties;
- it existed under separate legislation to that which empowered the Army.

The raising of battalions on a county basis followed the pattern of raising militias. There were, however, several exceptions with the UDR. Belfast was not a county borough in 1793 and previous militia units in County Londonderry did not use a county or city suffix and were simply known as "Derry" or "Londonderry".

The county connections are:

- County Antrim (1 UDR) – The Antrim Regiment of Militia, later known as the Antrim (Queen's Royal Rifles) Militia and (in 1881) 4th Royal Irish Rifles.
- County Armagh (2 UDR) – The Armagh Regiment of Militia, later known as the Armagh Light Infantry and (in 1881) 3rd Princess Victoria's Regiment (Royal Irish Fusiliers).
- County Down (3 UDR) – The Down Regiment of Militia, later known as the Royal North Down Rifles (here there is a tenuous connection with 7 UDR) and (in 1881) split into two separate units, 3 Royal Irish Rifles (the North Down Militia) and the Royal South Down Light Infantry, later known as 5 Royal Irish Rifles (the South Down Militia).
- County Fermanagh (4 UDR) – The Fermanagh Regiment which became the Fermanagh Light Infantry and (in 1881) the 3rd Royal Inniskilling Fusiliers.
- County Londonderry (5 UDR) – The Londonderry Regiment, later known as the Londonderry Light Infantry and (in 1881) briefly as the 4th Royal Inniskilling Fusiliers before being transferred to the Royal Artillery as 9th Brigade, North Irish Division RA.
- County Tyrone (6 UDR) – The Tyrone Regiment, later the Royal Tyrone Regiment and the Royal Tyrone Fusliers Militia before being renamed the 5th Royal Inniskilling Fusiliers and finally the 4th Royal Inniskilling Fusiliers.

== Bibliography ==
- A Testimony to Courage – the Regimental History of the Ulster Defence Regiment 1969 – 1992, John Potter, Pen & Sword Books Ltd, 2001, ISBN 0-85052-819-4
- The Ulster Defence Regiment: An Instrument of Peace?, Chris Ryder 1991 ISBN 0-413-64800-1
- Echo Company, The History of E Company 5th Battalion of the Ulster Defence Regiment, by Ronnie Gamble 2007. ISBN 978-0-9558069-0-2
