= 7th/10th Battalion, Ulster Defence Regiment =

7th/10th (City of Belfast) Battalion Ulster Defence Regiment
- Ulster Defence regimental crest
- Active: 1984–1992
- Country: United Kingdom
- Branch: British Army
- Type: Infantry battalion
- Role: Internal Security
- Size: 750
- Regimental Headquarters: Lisburn
- Mottos: "Quis Separabit" (Latin) "Who Shall Separate Us?"
- March: (Quick) Garryowen & Sprig of Shillelagh. (Slow) Oft in the Stilly Night

Commanders
- Colonel Commandant: First: General Sir John Anderson GBE, KCB, DSO. Last: General Sir Charles Huxtable, KCB, CBE, DL
- Colonel of the Regiment: Colonel Sir Dennis Faulkner CBE

The 7th/10th (City of Belfast) Battalion, Ulster Defence Regiment was formed in 1984 as a result of an amalgamation between the 7th Battalion Ulster Defence Regiment and the 10th Battalion Ulster Defence Regiment. The resultant 7/10 UDR was subsumed into the Royal Irish Rangers in 1992 as part of the amalgamation which formed the Royal Irish Regiment.

== Uniform, armament & equipment ==
See: Ulster Defence Regiment Uniform, armament & equipment

== Music ==
In 1990 and 1991 the pipes and drums of 7/10 UDR came second in the European piping championships.

== The Stephens Enquiry ==
In 1989, twenty-eight UDR soldiers were arrested as part of Stevens Inquiry into alleged collusion with loyalist paramilitaries. Twenty-six belonged to the same company of 7/10 UDR. Six were later awarded damages. One was charged with activities linked to loyalist paramilitaries. The Stephens team caused "intense anger" as three hundred police had been used to surround the homes of suspects. This had identified them as UDR soldiers to their neighbours, potentially putting their lives at risk. Eleven moved house as a result and the homes of eighteen others were provided with "additional security measures" at a cost of £25,000.

== IRA infiltration? ==
At the start of June 1987, three attacks were made against soldiers of the same company of the battalion, including Private John Tracey who was shot dead as he started a new job on apartments off the Lisburn Road, Belfast. The Belfast Newsletter reported that 7/10 UDR had been infiltrated by the IRA. The commanding officer accepted that someone must have informed on him but denied that the IRA had been able to penetrate the battalion calling the allegation a "wild rumour".Yet to this day no one has been held accountable for his murder that left his wife and six children without a father or a husband.

== Notable personnel ==
- Category:Ulster Defence Regiment soldiers
- Category:Ulster Defence Regiment officers

== See also ==
- Ulster Defence Regiment
- List of battalions and locations of the Ulster Defence Regiment

== Bibliography ==
- A Testimony to Courage – the Regimental History of the Ulster Defence Regiment 1969 – 1992, John Potter, Pen & Sword Books Ltd, 2001, ISBN 0-85052-819-4
- The Ulster Defence Regiment: An Instrument of Peace?, Chris Ryder 1991 ISBN 0-413-64800-1
- Lost Lives, David McKittrick, Mainstream, 2004, ISBN 184018504X
