= 7th Battalion, Ulster Defence Regiment =

Military unit

7th (City of Belfast) Battalion, Ulster Defence Regiment
- Ulster Defence regimental crest
- Active: 1971–1984
- Country: United Kingdom
- Branch: British Army
- Type: Infantry battalion
- Role: Internal Security
- Size: 750
- Regimental Headquarters: Lisburn
- Mottos: "Quis Separabit" (Latin) "Who Shall Separate Us?"
- March: (Quick) Garryowen & Sprig of Shillelagh. (Slow) Oft in the Stilly Night

Commanders
- Colonel Commandant: First: General Sir John Anderson GBE, KCB, DSO. Last: General Sir Charles Huxtable, KCB, CBE, DL
- Colonel of the Regiment: Colonel Sir Dennis Faulkner CBE

7th (City of Belfast) Battalion, Ulster Defence Regiment (7 UDR) was formed in 1970 as part of the 7 original battalions specified in The Ulster Defence Regiment Act 1969, which received Royal Assent on 18 December 1969 and was brought into force on 1 January 1970. It was amalgamated with the 10th Battalion, Ulster Defence Regiment in 1984 to form the 7th/10th (City of Belfast) Battalion, Ulster Defence Regiment.

== History ==
Along with the other 6 original battalions, 7 UDR commenced operational duties on 1 April 1970.

The first training major (TISO - training intelligence and security officer) was Major RW Wilson, Royal Welsh Fusiliers, who took up his appointment at Palace Barracks just outside Belfast. Part of his job was to find accommodation for the various companies of the new battalion. Where possible accommodation was sought in army bases although the old Ulster Special Constabulary platoon huts were vacant and available. To have used those would have attracted criticism from those who were already claiming that the UDR was the B Specials under a new name.

== Recruitment ==
The appointment of Non-commissioned officers (NCOs) was carried out in a variety of ways. In most cases, men were selected who had previously held non-commissioned rank in any of the armed forces or the USC. The filling of senior NCO posts in this manner did have a drawback in that many men of comparatively young ages who had considerable years of service before retirement or promotion created a "promotion block"

=== Intimidation ===
Protestant and Catholic soldiers were both intimidated out of the regiment. Following the introduction of internment however more Catholic soldiers found themselves the subject of intimidation from within their own community.

== Uniform, armament & equipment ==
See: Ulster Defence Regiment Uniform, armament & equipment

== Casualties ==
The first soldier from the battalion to be killed was Private Sean Russell, aged 30 (D Company) who was killed as he sat at home with his wife and five children in the predominantly Catholic New Barnsley estate in Belfast. Private Russell was also the first Catholic UDR soldier to be killed by the Provisional IRA. Following his death 40 Catholics resigned from the regiment.

== Notable personnel ==
- Category:Ulster Defence Regiment soldiers
- Category:Ulster Defence Regiment officers

== See also ==
- Ulster Defence Regiment
- List of battalions and locations of the Ulster Defence Regiment

== Bibliography ==
- Potter, John Furniss. A Testimony to Courage – the Regimental History of the Ulster Defence Regiment 1969–1992, Pen & Sword Books Ltd, 2001, ISBN 0-85052-819-4
- Ryder, Chris. The Ulster Defence Regiment: An Instrument of Peace?, 1991 ISBN 0-413-64800-1
