= List of attacks on the Ulster Defence Regiment =

This page is a record of notable attacks by paramilitary organisations on Ulster Defence Regiment personnel during the Troubles resulting in two or more fatalities, or notable firsts:

== 1971 ==
- 9 August - a patrol from 6 UDR's Strabane company came under fire from the Provisional IRA using a Thompson sub-machine gun at a checkpoint near Clady Bridge border crossing, County Tyrone. Private Winston Donnell was killed instantly. He was the first UDR soldier to be killed in action.
- 8 December - the first Catholic UDR soldier to die, Private Sean Russell, is shot dead in his home in New Barnsley, Belfast by the IRA.

== 1972 ==
- 4 March - Captain Marcus McCausland, formerly of D Coy 5 UDR is abducted and killed by the Official Irish Republican Army (OIRA). He was the first UDR officer to be killed.
- 21 September - a member of C Coy, 4 UDR and his wife are shot dead by the Provisional IRA as they watched TV at home near Derrylin.

== 1974 ==
- 10 April - Major George Saunderson (Brevet Lt Col), until the previous year second-in-command of 4 UDR, was killed in the kitchen of the school in Derrylin where he worked by gunmen who then crashed through a Garda checkpoint to escape into the Republic of Ireland.
- 2 May - attack at the Deanery base of C Coy, 6 UDR in Clogher. Opening fire using mortars then continuing with small arms and rockets, the estimated 40-man IRA team mounted a sustained attack lasting for 25 minutes against the small contingent in the base who reply with automatic rifle fire, supported by Ferret armoured personnel carriers from the 1 Royal Tank Regiment. During the attack, Private Eva Martin was hit by a rocket fragment and died shortly after. She was the first woman UDR soldier to be killed. Sean O'Callaghan was later convicted of murder after confessing his participation in the assault.
- 28 October - a bomb attack at the joint 3 UDR and regular army barracks at Ballykinlar destroys the Sandes soldiers canteen on the base, killing two members of the Duke of Edinburgh's Royal Regiment.

== 1991 ==
- 1 March - A mobile patrol from the 2nd Battalion was the subject of the first recorded use of the Mk12 horizontal mortar Two soldiers were killed as a result of the attack. The funeral of one of them, Private Paul Sutcliffe, an Englishman, was held in Barrowford, Lancashire - the only UDR funeral to be held outside Northern Ireland. The second casualty, Private Roger Love, from Portadown died after three days. His kidneys were donated to the NHS.
- 31 May - At 11:30 PM a driverless truck loaded with 2,000 lb (1,100 kg) of a new type of home made explosive was rolled down a hill at the rear of the barracks and crashed through the perimeter fence, coming to rest against a corner of the main building. Automatic fire was heard by witnesses just before the explosion. The blast left a deep crater and it could be heard over 30 miles away, as far as Dundalk. Three UDR soldiers – Paul Blakely (30), Robert Crozier (46), Sydney Hamilton (44) – were killed and ten were wounded. Four civilians were also wounded. The Provisional IRA claimed responsibility two days later.

== 1992 ==
- 17 January - Two off-duty UDR soldiers, working in the rebuilt of a British Army barracks at Omagh were seriously wounded when a civilian van carrying them and 12 others back home was struck by an improvised explosive device at Teebane, a rural crossroads between Omagh and Cookstown in County Tyrone. Eight other workers, one of them a member of the Royal Irish Rangers, were killed in the blast.
- 17 June - In one of the last attacks on the regiment as an operational unit, a bomb in central Belfast wounded five UDR soldiers and two RUC constables.

== Sources ==
- A Testimony to Courage - the Regimental History of the Ulster Defence Regiment 1969 - 1992, Major John Furniss Potter, Pen & Sword Books Ltd, 2001, ISBN 0-85052-819-4
- The Ulster Defence Regiment - An Instrument of Peace?, Chris Ryder, Methuen 1991, ISBN 0-413-64800-1
