= 10th Battalion, Ulster Defence Regiment =

Military unit

10th (City of Belfast) Battalion, Ulster Defence Regiment
- Ulster Defence regimental crest
- Active: 1972–1984
- Country: United Kingdom
- Branch: British Army
- Type: Infantry battalion
- Role: Internal Security
- Size: 750
- Regimental Headquarters: Lisburn
- Mottos: "Quis Separabit" (Latin) "Who Shall Separate Us?"
- March: (Quick) Garryowen & Sprig of Shillelagh. (Slow) Oft in the Stilly Night

Commanders
- Colonel Commandant: First: General Sir John Anderson GBE, KCB, DSO. Last: General Sir Charles Huxtable, KCB, CBE, DL
- Colonel of the Regiment: Colonel Sir Dennis Faulkner CBE

The 10th (City of Belfast) Battalion, Ulster Defence Regiment was formed in 1972 from elements of the 7th Battalion, Ulster Defence Regiment creating a second battalion in Belfast. It was again amalgamated with 7 UDR in 1984 to form the 7th/10th Battalion, Ulster Defence Regiment.

== Uniform, armament & equipment ==
See: Ulster Defence Regiment Uniform, armament & equipment

== Notable personnel ==
- Category:Ulster Defence Regiment soldiers
- Category:Ulster Defence Regiment officers

== Gerry Adams wounded ==
When Gerry Adams (the Sinn Féin president) was wounded in an assassination attempt by three members of the UFF it was an off duty full-time Non-commissioned officer of 10 UDR who gave chase to their car and arrested them, assisted by an off duty policeman. This is not noted in Adams' Sinn Féin biography and the BBC still insists the assailants were arrested by "plain clothes policemen". The UDR NCO received the Queen's Gallantry Medal for arresting the gunmen. In the long term however the soldier was intimidated out of his home and the UDR as a direct result of these arrests.

== Investigations ==
A 1977 Army investigation involving D Company, 10 UDR, based at Girdwood Barracks in Belfast revealed that about 70 of the company's soldiers were suspected of links to the UVF, but evidence was only found against two, who were dismissed on security grounds. 30 soldiers from D Company were suspected of fraudulently diverting £47,000 to the UVF; and that UVF members socialized at Girdwood Barracks junior ranks mess. This investigation was halted after a senior UDR officer claimed it was harming morale.

== See also ==
- Ulster Defence Regiment
- List of battalions and locations of the Ulster Defence Regiment

== Bibliography ==
- A Testimony to Courage – the Regimental History of the Ulster Defence Regiment 1969 – 1992, John Potter, Pen & Sword Books Ltd, 2001, ISBN 0-85052-819-4
- The Ulster Defence Regiment: An Instrument of Peace?, Chris Ryder 1991 ISBN 0-413-64800-1
- Lost Lives, David McKittrick, Mainstream, 2004, ISBN 184018504X
