= 5th Battalion, Ulster Defence Regiment =

Military unit

5th (County Londonderry) Battalion, Ulster Defence Regiment
- Regimental Insignia
- Active: 1970–1992
- Country: United Kingdom
- Branch: British Army
- Type: Infantry battalion
- Role: Internal Security
- Size: 750
- Regimental Headquarters: Lisburn
- Mottos: "Quis Separabit" (Latin) "Who Shall Separate Us?"
- March: (Quick) Garryowen & Sprig of Shillelagh. (Slow) Oft in the Stilly Night

Commanders
- Colonel Commandant: First: General Sir John Anderson GBE, KCB, DSO. Last: General Sir Charles Huxtable, KCB, CBE, DL
- Colonel of the Regiment: Colonel Sir Dennis Faulkner CBE

5th (County Londonderry) Battalion, Ulster Defence Regiment (5 UDR) was formed in 1970 as part of the seven original battalions specified in The Ulster Defence Regiment Act 1969, which received Royal Assent on 18 December 1969 and was brought into force on 1 January 1970. It was, along with the rest of the regiment, amalgamated with the Royal Irish Rangers in 1992 to form the Royal Irish Regiment.

== Recruitment ==
Recruitment for 5 UDR was initially slow. The battalion began its duties on 1 April 1970 with only 200 men to patrol Derry city and a further 300 to cover the rest of the county as opposed to the Ulster Special Constabulary (which the UDR replaced) figures for the previous day of 600 and 1,200 respectively. Catholic recruitment was on a par with Protestant figures however and the two city companies of 5 UDR were 50/50 in makeup, with John Hume known to have signed at least one application and told the recruit to "go out and find all the decent Catholic people he could to enlist".

Sir Robin Chichester-Clark complained asked in the Parliament of the United Kingdom why one of his constituents was turned down for the force as he was a churchwarden and a local government official. The reply by Roy Hattersley stated that the vetting team had been instructed to err on the side of caution and that two clergymen had also been refused because the new force was to be "isolated from political and sectarian influence".

=== Intimidation ===
Protestant and Catholic soldiers were both intimidated out of the regiment. Following the introduction of internment however more Catholic soldiers found themselves the subject of intimidation from within their own community. One captain in 5 UDR, who had been a member of the Northern Ireland Civil Rights Association and had taken part in the Derry march, was intimidated out of the regiment, out of his job and out of Derry.

The OC of the Waterside Company commented that it was "very, very soul destroying" to lose good men this way, especially when they so obviously enjoyed being soldiers in the regiment.

== History ==
With the other six original battalions, 5 UDR commenced operational duties on 1 April 1970. Battalion Headquarters was established at the former anti-submarine warfare school but was later moved to more suitable accommodation in Shackleton Barracks, Ballykelly, County Londonderry which they shared at various times with the Royal Air Force, the Army Air Corps and various units of the British Army.

The battalion had the largest Tactical Area of Responsibility in the regiment which covered parts of two counties (Londonderry and Antrim) as well as three police divisions 1,600 square miles in total.

The first commanding officer of 5 UDR was Lieutenant Colonel Kenneth Bulstrode Lloyd Davidson JP, MID who had seen action in World War II as an officer with the 2nd Battalion, Argyll and Sutherland Highlanders. He had been Deputy Lord Lieutenant, High Sheriff for County Londonderry and later, Commandant of the City of Derry Ulster Special Constabulary between 1968 and 1970.

Following his retirement after his agreed one year of service he was replaced by the battalion's first regular commanding officer, Lt Col John Lys.

The second in command (2 i/c) of the battalion upon formation was Major George Lapsley, the son of a police inspector, graduate of Magee College, World War II veteran of the Royal Navy (Far Eastern campaign), and officer of the Territorial Army. He was responsible for recruitment in the early stages. The job of 2 i/c was usually given to the senior part-time officer of the battalion until 1991 when the post was changed to one for a regular officer.

The first Training Major (TISO) was Major LSTH Pelham-Burn of the Coldstream Guards. Part of his job was to organise accommodation for all the companies of the new battalion. Where possible accommodation was sought in army bases and although the old Ulster Special Constabulary platoon huts were vacant and available, to have used those was politically undesirable.

== Companies ==
The battalion eventually had seven rifle companies which were based at: Ebrington Barracks, Derry (A, West Bank, Coy and B, Waterside Coy), C Coy in Claudy, D Coy in Shackleton Barracks, Ballykelly, E Coy at Laurel House, Coleraine, F Coy in Magherafelt. and G Coy in Maghera.

G Coy was originally the B Coy of 1 UDR based in Ballymoney. It came under the command of 5 UDR in 1983. A further change in 1992 saw E and G Coys merge to form D Company.

=== E Company ===
Raised in 1971 the first Officer Commanding E Company (E Coy) was Major George Lapsley who transferred in from battalion headquarters.

The company was broken down into four platoons. The majority of soldiers in 21 Platoon came from Portrush, Portstewart (the Ports) and the Windyhall area of Coleraine. 22 Platoon's soldiers lived on the east side of the River Bann. 23 Platoon's men and women came from the west side of the Bann, known as "The Heights" whilst 24 Platoon recruited from Garvagh and surrounding areas. The resulting platoon structure had soldiers from each area regular patrolling territory they were familiar with and where they knew most people from the locality. This was a hallmark of the early UDR part-timers: that they were able to tell when something was amiss in the areas they knew when out on patrol.

21 Platoon The Ports	22 Platoon East Bann	23 Platoon West Bann	24 Platoon Garvagh
No 1 Section	No 1 Section	No 1 Section	No 1 Section
No 2 Section	No 2 Section	No 2 Section	No 2 Section
No 3 Section	No 3 Section	No 3 Section	No 3 Section

Company headquarters was established in the former USC Drill Hall in Macosquin. After discussion with a local property owner "Laurel Hill House", built in 1843, was purchased by the Army Property Services Department for £24,000 but required work in excess of £100,000 to make it fit for purpose. The house had been military accommodation in the past when it was requisitioned for the United States Army in World War II. It was also reputed to be haunted.

By the time E Company took possession of the house and outbuilding they had been converted into a barracks which contained all the facilities expected to be found in UDR company and battalion locations, including a guardroom, armoury, Motor Transport (MT) section, 25 metre indoor rifle range (for .22 Long Rifle .22 calibre only), Officer's Mess, Warrant Officers and Sergeant's Mess, Junior Ranks Bar, snooker room, stores, lecture rooms, offices, operations room, sangars and a pipe range. A pipe range consists of a 30-metre section of concrete pipe of 1 metre diameter, set onto the ground and covered substantially with earth. It was used in military bases in Northern Ireland for rifle practice when surrounding buildings made it unsafe to establish an open shooting range.

A helicopter pad was also established in the grounds of the house and a drill hall built close by. The drill hall also doubled as a room for large functions.

The house and 4.5 acres of grounds were placed on the market again in 2012 and sold at auction for an undisclosed sum although the guide price was listed at £190,000.

== Uniform, armament and equipment ==
Initially, arms had to be drawn from the North Irish Horse barracks in Ballymoney, which by that time had become B Coy 1 UDR (see also Ulster Defence Regiment#Uniform, armament and equipment).

== Music ==
5 UDR had a number of champion pipers and drummers who, apart from local performances, represented the regiment at the Horse Guards Parade, the Festival of Remembrance in the Royal Albert Hall, London, the Colchester Tattoo, the Queen's Birthday Celebrations in York, an International Air Show at Aldergove and on a tour of the British Army of the Rhine.

In the World Pipe Band Championships of 1978, the pipes and drums of 5 UDR won the Royal Scottish Pipe Band Association championship against 126 other entrants. In the World Pipe Band Championships of 1979, competing against 260 other bands, they won both the "Piping and Marching" and "Discipline" trophies, improving on their 1978 placings of second and first respectively in those categories.

The album 5 UDR Pipes & Drums "Irish & Scottish Pipe Music", which includes recordings of the regimental and battalion's marches as well as other popular tunes, was the only recording publicly released by regimental musicians.

== Casualties ==
28 soldiers from 5 UDR died whilst on active duty during the Troubles and a further 12 were assassinated after leaving the regiment.

The first to die was Captain Marcus McCausland, a Catholic. McCausland had previously served with the Irish Guards. His family owned a large estate outside Limavady. He had served as high sheriff for the county and was also a member of Limavady urban district council. The Official Irish Republican Army abducted him and interrogated him for four hours before shooting him and dumping his body in the snow.

The hooded body of Sergeant David C. Deacon, 38 (HQ Company), was found on 3 March 1973 near Derry. His hands were tied behind his back, and he had been tortured. Deacon had previous service in the Royal Navy, was married with four children and was off duty at the time of his abduction and death. Eight years after his death, his wife and four other UDR and RUC widows formed The Widow's Mite to tell the world their side of the story and to counter IRA propaganda. She had her gold wedding melted down and recast as the ancient "mite" bearing the symbol of a lighted candle.

== Memorials ==
A number of memorials exist to the fallen of the 5th Battalion. The main memorial to the UDR was erected in Lisburn, unveiled on 12 June 2011 by Viscount Brookeborough, one of the trustees of the UDR Memorial Trust. The memorial is "a 19-foot 'heroic scale' bronze sculpture" featuring "bronze figures of a male UDR soldier and a female 'Greenfinch' on operational duty...set upon an equally impressive Mourne granite plinth.".

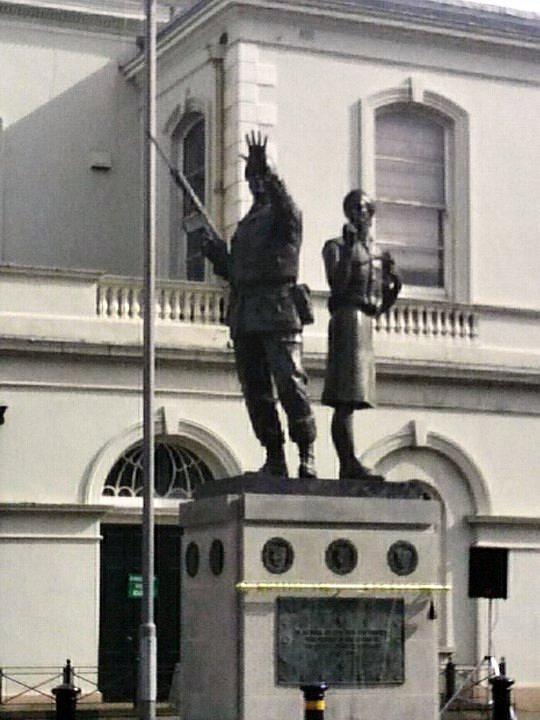
UDR memorial in Lisburn

== See also ==
- Ulster Defence Regiment
- List of battalions and locations of the Ulster Defence Regiment

== Bibliography ==
- Gamble, Ronnie. My Service Life, 1939–1979: William (Bill) Balmer, 2009, Causeway Museum Service, ISBN 978-0-9552286-4-3
- McKitterick, David. Lost Lives, Mainstream Publishing, 2004, ISBN 184018504X
- Potter, John Furniss. A Testimony to Courage – the Regimental History of the Ulster Defence Regiment 1969–1992, Pen & Sword Books Ltd, 2001, ISBN 0-85052-819-4
- Ryder, Chris. The Ulster Defence Regiment: An Instrument of Peace?, 1991 ISBN 0-413-64800-1
