= 3rd Battalion, Ulster Defence Regiment =

Military unit

3rd (County Down) Battalion, Ulster Defence Regiment
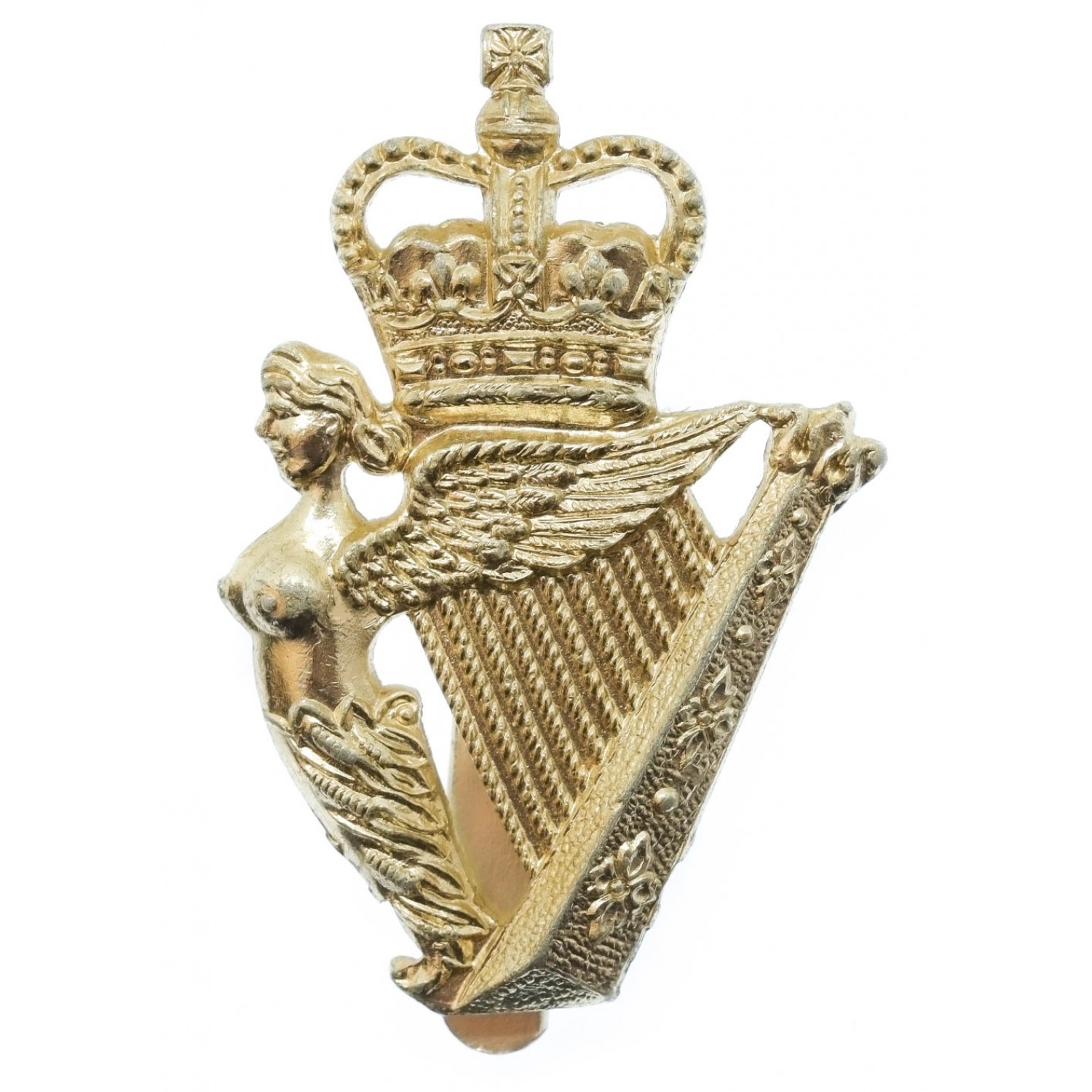
- Regimental Insignia
- Active: 1970–1992
- Country: United Kingdom
- Branch: British Army
- Type: Infantry battalion
- Role: Internal Security
- Size: 750
- Regimental Headquarters: Lisburn
- Mottos: "Quis Separabit" (Latin) "Who Shall Separate Us?"
- March: (Quick) Garryowen & Sprig of Shillelagh. (Slow) Oft in the Stilly Night

Commanders
- Colonel Commandant: First: General Sir John Anderson GBE, KCB, DSO. Last: General Sir Charles Huxtable, KCB, CBE, DL
- Colonel of the Regiment: Colonel Sir Dennis Faulkner CBE

3rd (County Down) Battalion, Ulster Defence Regiment (3 UDR) was formed in 1970 as part of the seven original battalions specified in The Ulster Defence Regiment Act 1969, which received Royal Assent on 18 December 1969 and was brought into force on 1 January 1970. It was, along with the rest of the regiment, amalgamated with the Royal Irish Rangers in 1992 to form the Royal Irish Regiment.

== Recruitment ==
3 UDR had the smallest number of applications from former special constables. It was thought this was because the former county adjutant was discouraging his men from recruitment with the UDR. It also had, along with 7 UDR the highest percentage of Catholic recruits, with two becoming Permanent Staff Instructors.

The company commander (OC) of C Company, (Newry), 3 UDR, had been OC of the disbanded TA company of the Royal Irish Fusiliers in the town and was pleased to see that virtually all of his TA soldiers were on parade, in the TA Centre, in exactly the same drill hall as they had previously used, for the first night of the new regiment. Many of these men were Catholic ex-servicemen. The OC noted there were also some former B Specials in the room and observed they did not initially associate with the others – not on the grounds of religion but because the former TA soldiers all knew each other socially and sat together on canteen breaks whereas the former specials kept to their own group of comrades, but within a week both had melded together.

=== Appointment of NCOs and officers ===
The appointment of Non-commissioned officers (NCOs) was carried out in a variety of ways. In most cases, men were selected who had previously held non-commissioned rank in any of the armed forces or the USC. In C Company, Newry, many of the recruits had formerly been soldiers in the local territorial company of the Royal Irish Fusiliers, including the company commander. It was a simple matter to appoint men who had previously been his NCOs and he supplemented these with former sergeants from the USC. The filling of senior NCO posts in this manner did have a drawback in that many men of comparatively young ages who had considerable years of service before retirement or promotion created a "promotion block"

Many of the men had previously served with the armed forces and, as a result, were given rank immediately. Two of these were made Permanent Staff Instructors and one was appointed as Company Sergeant Major of C Company, Newry. The second in command of the battalion, the most senior appointment for a part-time soldier, with the rank of major, was also Catholic. This led to a complaint from the chairman of the Ulster Special Constabulary association who claimed that: in 3 UDR preference for promotion and appointments was being given to Catholics. This wasn't true of course. In some battalions where former special constables were in the majority, they were the ones being given a promotion and it could equally have been claimed in those cases that Protestants were given an unfair advantage. Ultimately, the policy was to promote those with experience.

== History ==
Along with the other six original battalions, 3 UDR commenced operational duties on 1 April 1970. Battalion Headquarters were located at Ballykinler Army Base which is also home to Abercorn Barracks where another British unit would be on a 2-year posting. Bases were also located in Kilkeel and Rathfriland. It was the first battalion to be raised.

The first commanding officer (CO) was Lt Col Desmond Woods MC and bar. Woods had won the MC with the Royal Ulster Rifles in Palestine during 1938, at that time he was the youngest holder of the award. He won his bar to the MC in Italy in 1944 Prior to his appointment as commanding officer of 3 UDR he had been the County Commandant of the Ulster Special Constabulary for County Down from 1958. In his earliest days as CO, Woods made it clear that he welcomed Catholics into his battalion. This was not welcomed by his former adjutant from the B Specials who started a campaign to discourage former specials from joining. This man had been retained in the USC after the force was disbanded in order to ensure that all weapons were handed in, so he still had ample contact with the men in order to make his case.

The first training major (TISO - training int and security officer) was Major GJ Entwistle, Royal Regiment of Fusiliers, who was sent to the old hutted camp at Ballykinlar. Part of his job was to find accommodation for the various companies of the new battalion. Where possible accommodation was sought in army bases although the old Ulster Special Constabulary platoon huts were vacant and available. To have used those would have attracted criticism from people who were already claiming that the UDR was the B Specials under a new name.

In 1989 the battalion recorded over 900,000 man-hours of duty and the notable success of, in a joint operation with the Royal Ulster Constabulary, discovering a "highly sophisticated" arms factory which turned out homemade submachine guns for a loyalist terror group.

== Company structure ==
Only one of the USC Sub-District Commandants was able to join the battalion as the others were too old. He was given the rank of major and the command of one of the companies. The other company commanders were, a wartime Royal Marine and two former TA officers, one a Catholic.

== Uniform, armament & equipment ==
=== Boat sections ===
The battalion was equipped with high speed Dory patrol boats from 1972 onwards. The section was commanded by Sir Dennis Faulkner who had previously held the rank of lieutenant commander in the Royal Naval Reserve before being commissioned into the regiment. Faulkner was later to be appointed as regimental colonel in 1982

== Greenfinches ==
=== Intimidation ===
Protestant and Catholic soldiers were both intimidated out of the regiment. Following the introduction of internment, however, more Catholic soldiers found themselves the subject of intimidation from within their own community. In C Company the son of the guard sergeant, who had a young family, was burnt out of his home. The wife of another sergeant, an ex-regular soldier from County Donegal, was threatened whilst out shopping. The daughter of one Permanent Staff Instructor was so bullied at school that he threatened to send her to a Protestant school. In Castlewellan a Catholic soldier resigned because of intimidation.

== Casualties ==
In 3 UDR the most senior officer killed was part-time Major Ivan Toombs, assassinated on 16 January 1981. Seriously wounded in a previous attack in 1976, Major Toombs was a former member of the Ulster Special Constabulary with 10 years experience who had joined 3 UDR at formation. He was a family man, a Scout leader and keen sports player. A customs officer himself, Toombs had been set up by PIRA member Eamon Collins, who also worked in customs.

== Notable personnel ==
- Category:Ulster Defence Regiment soldiers
- Category:Ulster Defence Regiment officers

== See also ==
- List of battalions and locations of the Ulster Defence Regiment

== Bibliography ==
- A Testimony to Courage – the Regimental History of the Ulster Defence Regiment 1969–1992, John Potter, Pen & Sword Books Ltd, 2001, ISBN 0-85052-819-4
- The Ulster Defence Regiment: An Instrument of Peace?, Chris Ryder 1991 ISBN 0-413-64800-1
- Lost Lives, David McKittrick, Mainstream, 2004, ISBN 184018504X
