= Pvt. Martin =

Pvt. Martin or Private Martin may refer to:

- Private Eva Martin, high school teacher, killed during attacks on the Ulster Defence Regiment by Sean O'Callaghan
- Sgt. James Martin II, USMC (1826–1895)
- Private Martin, a playable character in Call of Duty

== See also ==
- Martin (name)
