= 6th Battalion, Ulster Defence Regiment =

6th (County Tyrone) Battalion, Ulster Defence Regiment
- Ulster Defence regimental crest
- Active: 1971–1992
- Country: United Kingdom
- Branch: British Army
- Type: Infantry battalion
- Role: Internal Security
- Size: 750
- Regimental Headquarters: Lisburn
- Mottos: "Quis Separabit" (Latin) "Who Shall Separate Us?"
- March: (Quick) Garryowen & Sprig of Shillelagh. (Slow) Oft in the Stilly Night

Commanders
- Colonel Commandant: First: General Sir John Anderson GBE, KCB, DSO. Last: General Sir Charles Huxtable, KCB, CBE, DL
- Colonel of the Regiment: Colonel Sir Dennis Faulkner CBE

The 6th (County Tyrone) Battalion, Ulster Defence Regiment (6 UDR) was formed in 1970 as part of the seven original battalions specified in The Ulster Defence Regiment Act 1969, which received Royal Assent on 18 December 1969 and was brought into force on 1 January 1970. It was, along with the rest of the regiment, amalgamated with the Royal Irish Rangers in 1992 to form the Royal Irish Regiment.

== History ==
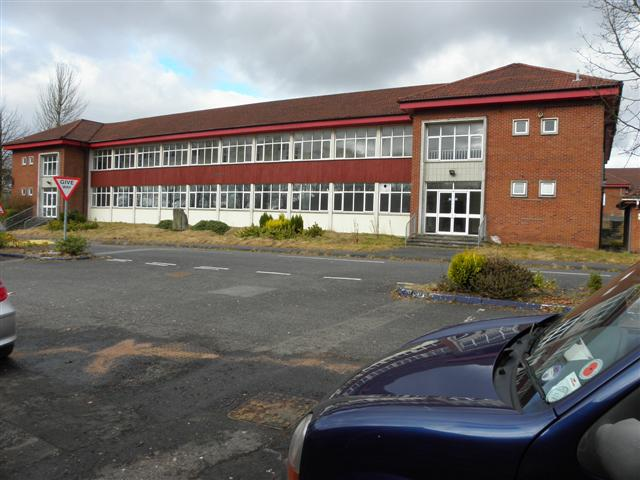
Lisanelly Barracks

Along with the other six original battalions, 6 UDR commenced operational duties on 1 April 1970. Around 75% (1,187) of the Tyrone members of the disbanded Ulster Special Constabulary (USC) applied to join 6 UDR, of which 419 were accepted. As a result, the battalion started life as the only battalion more or less up to strength and remained so during its history.

The first training major (TISO) was Major GB Hill, MBE, King's Own Borderers, who was based in the Education Building at Lisanelly Barracks, Omagh. Part of his job was to find accommodation for the various companies of the new battalion. Where possible accommodation was sought in British Army bases. The old USC platoon huts were vacant and available, but to have used those would have highlighted the continuity between the USC and the UDR.

For a time an old caravan in the centre of Dungannon served as the local UDR post. Ten rifles and 200 rounds of ammunition were stored there.

== Companies ==
=== C Company and The Deanery ===
The Deanery was an 18th-century mansion in Clogher, County Tyrone. It had been the home of Jonathan Swift, the author of Gulliver's Travels and was one of fifteen old large houses taken over by the Ministry of Defence to house the UDR. After persuading the old lady who lived there to move to less spartan accommodation, £150,000 was spent on the property to turn it into a base for C Company. The house has now been demolished.

== Loss of Catholics ==
Catholics soon began to leave the regiment in large numbers in response to the British Army's treatment of Catholic civilians, particularly after the implementation of the one-sided Operation Demetrius.

=== Intimidation ===
Protestant and Catholic soldiers were both intimidated out of the regiment. However, following the introduction of internment, more Catholic soldiers than Protestant found themselves the subject of pressure from within their own community, often amounting to intimidation and violence. In Clady, a soldier who had been in the regiment for only three weeks had his front door daubed with the words "Get out of the UDR or be shot – IRA". Two weeks later as he, his wife and their five children were asleep, a shotgun was fired at their home, shattering several windows.

== Casualties ==
During the general mobilisation for Operation Demetrius a patrol from the battalion came under fire from the Provisional IRA near Clady, County Tyrone. Private Winston Donnell, age 22, one of four brothers serving in the regiment, was killed outright. He was the first UDR soldier to be killed.

Sgt Kenneth Smyth Age 28, (B. Company), a former B Special, was killed on 10 December 1971 along with ex Pte Daniel McCormick (a Catholic), who had recently resigned from the Regiment. Sgt Smyth had survived a previous attempt to kill him.

Private William Bogle, age 27, (B Company) was killed as he sat in his car with his wife and children on 5 December 1972. His killer was believed to be a former member of the same company, known for his strong republican views, who resigned from the UDR after just one year, and who moved to the Republic of Ireland after the shooting and never came back.

Private Eva Martin, age 28 (C Company), was fatally wounded by rocket fragments on 3 May 1974 during a PIRA attack on 6 UDR's outlying base at the Deanery, Clogher. She was not only the first Greenfinch to be killed in action but the first female member of the security forces to die in the Troubles. Her husband, Lieutenant Martin was on duty with her when she was killed.

On 13 July 1983, Ronald Alexander (19), John Roxborough (19), Oswald Neely (20) and Thomas Harron (25), all members of D Company, were killed in a Provisional Irish Republican Army land mine attack on their mobile patrol on Ballymacilroy Hill, near Ballygawley.

== Notable personnel ==
- Category:Ulster Defence Regiment soldiers
- Category:Ulster Defence Regiment officers

== Colours ==
- November 1991 – 6 UDR was presented with colours at St Lucia Barracks, Omagh, by The Duke of Abercorn.

== See also ==
- Ulster Defence Regiment
- List of battalions and locations of the Ulster Defence Regiment

== Bibliography ==
- A Testimony to Courage – the Regimental History of the Ulster Defence Regiment 1969–1992, John Potter, Pen & Sword Books Ltd, 2001, ISBN 0-85052-819-4
- The Ulster Defence Regiment: An Instrument of Peace?, Chris Ryder 1991 ISBN 0-413-64800-1
