= Harold Pyman =

British Army officer in World War II

General Sir Harold Pyman GBE KCB DSO*
- Born: 12 March 1908
- Died: 9 October 1971 (aged 63)
- Military career
- Allegiance: United Kingdom
- Branch: British Army
- Service years: 1929–1964
- Rank: General
- Nickname: "Pete"
- Service number: 42251
- Unit: Royal Tank Regiment
- Commands: Allied Forces Northern Europe (1961–63); I Corps (1956–58); 11th Armoured Division (1953–55); 56th (London) Armoured Division (1949–51); 3rd Royal Tank Regiment (1942–43)
- Conflicts: North-West Frontier; Second World War; Palestine Emergency
- Awards: Knight Grand Cross of the Order of the British Empire; Knight Commander of the Order of the Bath; Distinguished Service Order & Bar; Mentioned in Despatches (2)

General Sir Harold English "Pete" Pyman, GBE, KCB, DSO & Bar (12 March 1908 – 9 October 1971) was a senior British Army officer who served during the Second World War and achieved high office in the 1960s. He was the eldest son of Harold English Pyman and Christian Jane Scott, and the great-grandson of George Pyman.

== Military career ==
Educated at Fettes College and Clare College, Cambridge, Pyman was commissioned into the Royal Tank Corps in 1929. He took part in operations on the North West Frontier of India in 1937.

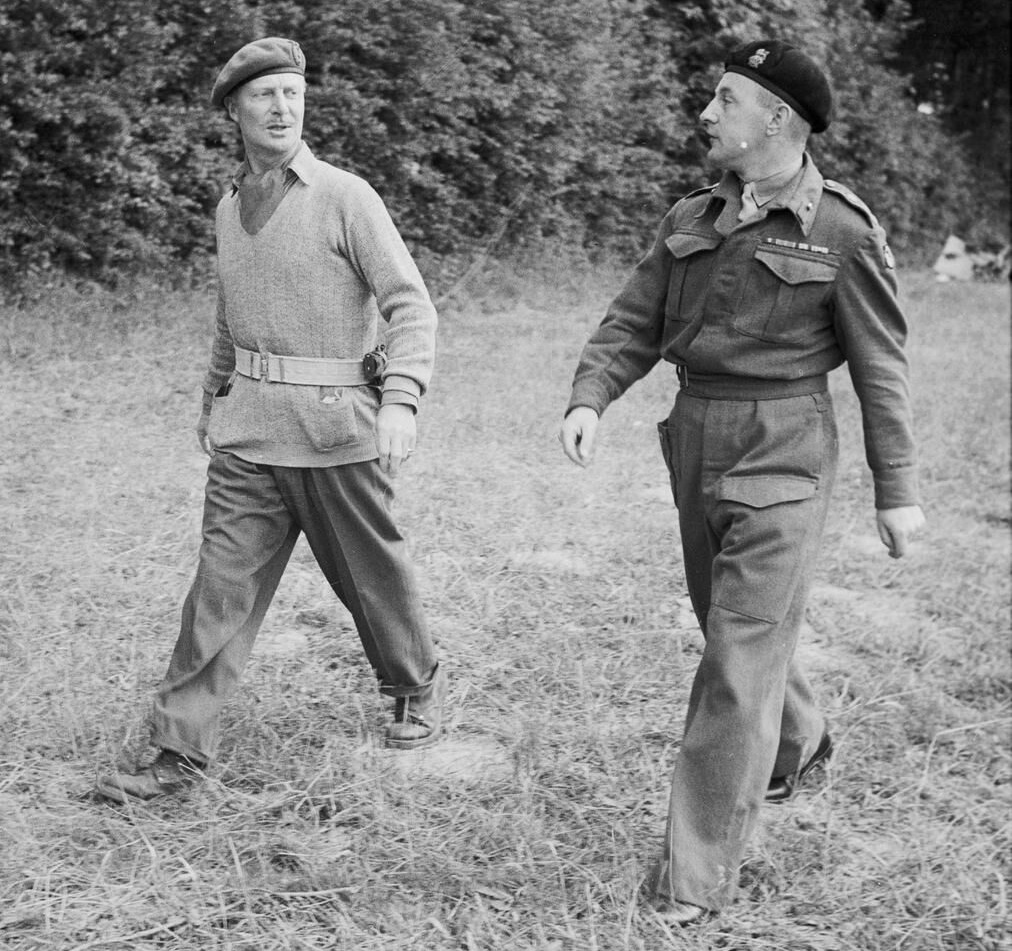
Lieutenant General Gerard Bucknall, pictured here on the left with Brigadier Harold Pyman, sometime in 1944.

Pyman served in the Second World War, initially as an instructor at the Staff College in Quetta in India from 1939 moving on to be a general staff officer in 7th Armoured Division in North Africa in 1942. He was appointed commanding officer of 3rd Royal Tank Regiment in North Africa in 1942. He was then a brigadier on the General Staff for Home Forces and then on the General Staff for XXX Corps in France in 1944. He was chief of staff of Second Army in North West Europe from later in 1944 to 1945.

After the war Pyman was on the General Staff of Allied Land Forces in South East Asia but moved on to be deputy director of Staff duties at the War Office in 1946 and then chief of staff for Middle East Land Forces later in 1946, during the Palestine Emergency. He was appointed general officer commanding for 56th (London) Armoured Division in 1949 and director general, fighting vehicles, at the Ministry of Supply in 1951.

Pyman became general officer commanding 11th Armoured Division in Germany in 1953 and director of weapons and development at the War Office in 1955 before becoming general officer commanding 1st British Corps within British Army of the Rhine in 1956 and Deputy Chief of Imperial General Staff in 1958. He was appointed Commander-in-Chief Allied Forces Northern Europe in 1961; he retired in 1964.

== Bibliography ==
- Mead, Richard (2007). Churchill's Lions: a biographical guide to the key British generals of World War II. Stroud (UK): Spellmount. ISBN 978-1-86227-431-0.
- Call to Arms by Sir Harold Pyman, Leo Cooper, 1971, ISBN 978-0-85052-063-7
- Smart, Nick (2005). Biographical Dictionary of British Generals of the Second World War. Barnesley: Pen & Sword. ISBN 1844150496.

Military offices
Preceded by Robert Arkwright	GOC 56th (London) Armoured Division; 1949–1951	Succeeded by Richard Goodbody
Preceded by Henry Foote	GOC 11th Armoured Division; 1953–1955	Succeeded by John Anderson
Preceded by Sir Hugh Stockwell	GOC 1st (British) Corps; 1956–1958	Succeeded by Sir Michael West
Preceded by Sir Richard Hull	Deputy Chief of the General Staff; 1958–1961	Succeeded by Sir John Anderson
Preceded by Sir Horatius Murray	C-in-C Allied Forces Northern Europe; 1961–1963	Succeeded by Sir Robert Bray
