= 4th Battalion, Ulster Defence Regiment =

Ulster military unit of the British Army

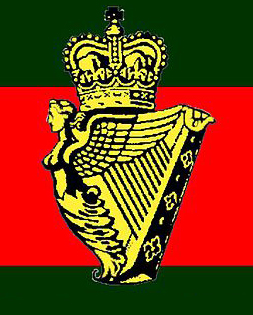
Badge and Emblem of the Ulster Defence Regiment CGC

4th (County Fermanagh) Battalion, Ulster Defence Regiment (4 UDR) was formed in 1970 as part of the seven original battalions specified in The Ulster Defence Regiment Act 1969, which received Royal Assent on 18 December 1969 and was brought into force on 1 January 1970. It was amalgamated with the 6th Battalion, Ulster Defence Regiment in 1992 to form the 4th/6th Battalion, Ulster Defence Regiment.

== History ==
Along with the other six original battalions, 4 UDR commenced operational duties on 1 April 1970.

The first training Major (TISO) was Major KW Battison of the Royal Welsh Fusiliers. Part of his job was to find accommodation for the various companies of the new battalion and, where possible, accommodation was sought in army bases. While the old Ulster Special Constabulary platoon huts were vacant and available, to have used those would have highlighted the continuity in personnel between the B Specials and the UDR. This reached 87% in the 4th Battalion, the highest of all UDR battalions.

The battalion was initially based in the ladies' restroom of the Territorial Army centre in Enniskillen but was moved to Grosvenor Barracks, Coleshill, Enniskillen, where a new "hardened" barracks was eventually built, partially underground, to withstand mortar attack. The modified barracks was opened by Gerald Grosvenor, 6th Duke of Westminster (who had long-standing family and military connections with the area) in 1991.

Most patrols from Grosvenor Barracks went out by helicopter or boat. Because of the danger of ambush, vehicles were only used in the urban area around Enniskillen. County Fermanagh is surrounded on three sides by the Republic of Ireland. Boat patrols were common as the county contains Lough Erne.

== Uniform, armament & equipment ==
See: Ulster Defence Regiment Uniform, armament & equipment

== Intimidation ==
Protestant and Catholic soldiers were both intimidated out of the regiment. Following the introduction of internment however more Catholic soldiers found themselves the subject of intimidation from within their own community. In Enniskillen one member of the conrate guard was Catholic. Some of his neighbours came to his home in the early hours of the morning and beat him as well as scrubbing his face with a hard brush. He was a frail man but was beaten black and blue and his face badly damaged by the brush. He resigned from the battalion the next day.

== Casualties ==
- On 1 March 1971, 43-year-old Thomas Fletcher (A Company) was abducted from his home at Frevagh near Garrison, County Fermanagh and killed a short distance away with 22 shots being fired into him, witnessed by his wife. Within five days of this, other soldiers of the 4th Battalion who lived in the Garrison area and had been threatened by the IRA, abandoned their homes and farms near the border.
- On 3 September 1971, Private Frank Veitch, aged 23, (B Company) a farmer, was on duty outside Kinawley police station. He was killed by five shots fired from a passing car. He was the first soldier from the 4th Battalion to be killed and the second from the regiment to be killed in action.
- Private Tommy. R. Bullock Age 53 (C. Company), 21 September 1972. He and his wife were shot at home as they watched TV by the IRA. Mrs. Bullock was shot dead at the front porch, The gunmen stepped over her body and went inside to kill her husband.

== Notable personnel ==
- Category:Ulster Defence Regiment soldiers
- Category:Ulster Defence Regiment officers

== See also ==
- List of battalions and locations of the Ulster Defence Regiment

== Bibliography ==
- David McKittrick, Lost Lives, Mainstream, 2004, ISBN 184018504X
- John Potter, A Testimony to Courage – the Regimental History of the Ulster Defence Regiment 1969–1992, Pen & Sword Books Ltd, 2001, ISBN 0-85052-819-4
- The Ulster Defence Regiment: An Instrument of Peace?, Chris Ryder 1991 ISBN 0-413-64800-1
