= Shackleton Barracks =

Military installation at Ballykelly, County Londonderry, Northern Ireland

- Ballykelly

Site information
- Type: Barracks
- Owner: Ministry of Defence
- Operator: British Army

Location
- Location within Northern Ireland
- Coordinates: 55°03′16″N 07°01′12″W

Site history
- Built: 1971
- In use: 1971–2008

Garrison information
- Occupants: 2nd Battalion Princess of Wales's Royal Regiment

Shackleton Barracks is a former British military installation at Ballykelly in Northern Ireland.

== History ==
The site formerly known as RAF Ballykelly was handed over to the British Army as Shackleton Barracks on 2 June 1971. Battalion HQ and HQ Company of the 5th Battalion, Ulster Defence Regiment arrived there shortly after the barracks opened. During Operation Demetrius between 1971 and 1972, the facilities operated as an interrogation centre where the five techniques were alleged to have been used. The village of Ballykelly suffered the Droppin Well bombing in 1982 which resulted in the loss of eighteen lives including both local civilians and soldiers from Shackleton Barracks. 5th Battalion, Ulster Defence Regiment moved out in 1992.

The camp became the HQ of 8th Infantry Brigade in October 2003 and the brigade remained there until it was disbanded and responsibility handed over to HQ 39th Infantry Brigade at Thiepval Barracks in Lisburn on 1 September 2006. It was then home to the infantry battalion 2nd Battalion Princess of Wales's Royal Regiment.

The British Army vacated Shackleton Barracks in March 2008 when 2nd Battalion, Princess of Wales's Royal Regiment moved to Royal Artillery Barracks at Woolwich. Some 776 acres (3.14 km^{2}) of land and 420 buildings were subsequently offered for sale.
