= Garryowen (air) =

Irish tune for a quickstep dance

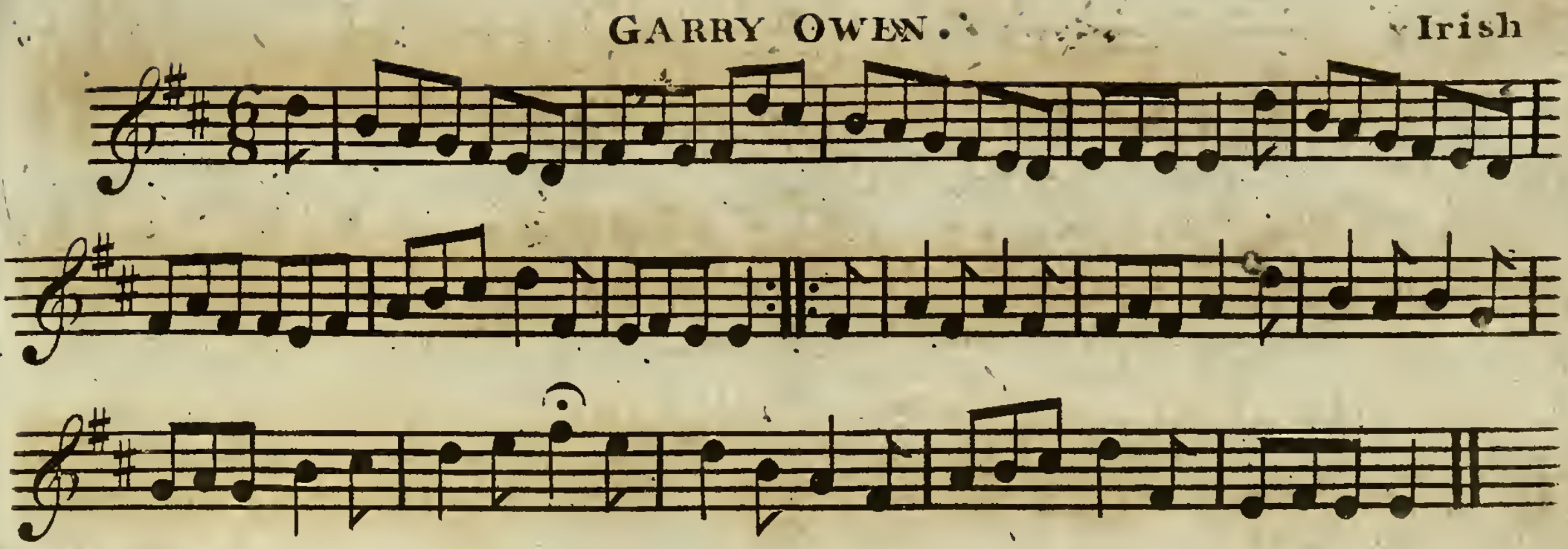
"Garry Owen" in an 1806 tune anthology.

Garryowen
Performed by the US Army Band Strings

"Garryowen" is an Irish tune for a jig dance. It became well known as a marching tune in Commonwealth and American military units such as George Armstrong Custer's 7th Cavalry Regiment.

== History ==
The melody is also known as "Auld Bessie", "The Scotch Laddie", and "Finnegan's Dream".

Garryowen (from the Irish Garraí Eoin, meaning Saint John's Court) is the name of a neighbourhood in Limerick. The song emerged during the late 18th century when it was a drinking song of young roisterers in the city. An alternate title is "Let Bacchus's Sons Be Not Dismayed".

1. Let Bacchus's sons be not dismayed,
But join with me, each jovial blade;
Come booze and sing and lend your aid
To help me with the chorus:
Chorus:
Instead of spa we'll drink brown ale
And pay the reckoning on the nail;
No man for debt shall go to gaol
From Garryowen in glory!

2. We are the boys that take delight in
Smashing the Limerick lamps when lighting,
Through the streets like sporters fighting
And tearing all before us.
Chorus

3. We'll break windows, we'll break doors,
The watch knock down by threes and fours;
Then let the doctors work their cures
And tinker up our bruises.
Chorus

4. We'll beat the bailiffs out of fun,
We'll make the mayor and sheriffs run;
We are the boys no man dares dun
If he regards a whole skin.
Chorus

5. Our hearts so stout have got us fame
For soon 'tis known from whence we came
Where'er we go they fear the name
Of Garryowen in glory.
Chorus

It was published with additional lyrics in Thomas Moore's 1808 Irish Melodies. Beethoven composed two arrangements of the song during 1809–1810 (published 1814–1816 as WoO 152 and WoO 154) with the title, "From Garyone my Happy Home", with lyrics by T. Toms, on romantic themes. The arrangements were part of a large project by George Thomson to engage prominent composers of his time to write arrangements of the folk songs of Ireland, Scotland, and Wales. The composer Mauro Giuliani arranged the tune in Arie Nazionali Irlandesi nr. 1–6, Op. 125 (Six Irish Airs). The Bohemian composer Ignaz Moscheles included the tune in his Op. 89, Souvenirs de l'Irlande, "Recollections of Ireland" for solo piano and orchestra.

=== British military units ===
A very early reference to the tune appears in the publication The Life of the Duke of Wellington by Jocquim Hayward Stocqueler, published in 1853. He describes the defence of the town of Tarifa during the Peninsular War, late December 1811. General Hugh Gough, commanding officer of the 87th Regiment (later the Royal Irish Fusiliers), under attack by French grenadiers, drew his sword, tossed his scabbard and called on his men to stand with him until the enemy should walk over their bodies. The troops responded with the "Garryowen".

It was used as a march by the 88th Regiment of Foot (Connaught Rangers) during the Peninsular War.

"Garryowen" was also a favourite during the Crimean War. The tune has been associated with a number of British and Commonwealth military units including the Liverpool Irish, the London Irish Rifles, the Ulster Defence Regiment, and the Irish Regiment of Canada.

=== US military units ===
In early 1851, Irish citizens of New York City formed a militia regiment known locally as the Second Regiment of Irish Volunteers. The group selected "Garryowen" as their official regimental marching song. On 12 October 1851, the regiment was accepted officially as part of the New York Militia and designated the 69th Infantry Regiment (the famed "Fighting 69th"). It is presently known officially as the 1st Battalion, 69th Infantry and is part of the 42nd Infantry Division. The song features prominently in the 1940 Warner Bros. film The Fighting 69th, starring James Cagney, Pat O'Brien, and Alan Hale, Sr., which chronicles the World War I exploits of the regiment.

==== 7th Cavalry ====
It later became the marching tune for the American 7th Cavalry Regiment during the late 19th century. The tune was brought to the 7th Cavalry by Brevet Colonel Myles Keogh and other officers with relations to the 5th Royal Irish Lancers and the Papal Guard. As the story goes, it was the last song played for Custer's men as they left General Terry's column at the Powder River. The song features in the 1941 biographical western They Died With Their Boots On, featuring Errol Flynn as Custer. It is also heard in John Ford westerns She Wore A Yellow Ribbon (1949) and The Searchers (1956), both starring John Wayne.

The 7th Cavalry became a part of the 1st Cavalry Division in 1921. The word "Garryowen" was used often during the Vietnam War by soldiers of the 1st Cavalry as a password to identify each other. It became the official tune of the division in 1981. The words Garry Owen now form part of the regimental crest.

The tune became the name for bases established by the cavalry in various conflicts. The most recent was Contingency Operating Site Garry Owen in the Maysan Province of Iraq. FOB Garryowen was established in support of Operation Iraqi Freedom 8–10 in June 2008 by the 2nd Battalion, 7th Cavalry Regiment. There was also a Camp Garry Owen north of Seoul, Korea, which housed part of the 4th Squadron of the 7th Cavalry.

Theodore Roosevelt considered it "the greatest fighting tune in the world".
