= Charles Huxtable (British Army officer) =

British Army general (1931–2018)

General Sir Charles Huxtable KCB CBE DL
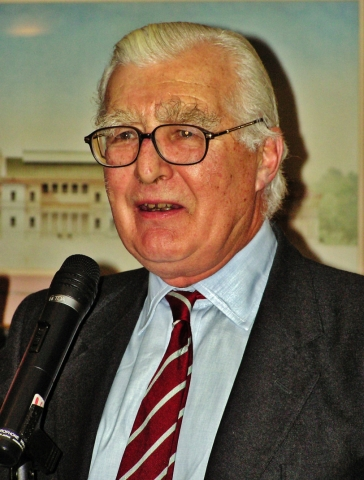
- Born: 22 July 1931; London, England
- Died: 26 November 2018 (aged 87)
- Military career
- Allegiance: United Kingdom
- Branch: British Army
- Service years: 1952–1990
- Rank: General
- Service number: 420858
- Commands: Land Forces
- Conflicts: Korean War; Cyprus Emergency; Operation Banner
- Awards: Knight Commander of the Order of the Bath; Commander of the Order of the British Empire

General Sir Charles Richard Huxtable, KCB, CBE, DL (22 July 1931 – 26 November 2018) was a senior British Army officer who served as Commander-in-Chief, Land Forces from 1988 to 1990.

== Military career ==
Huxtable graduated from the Royal Military Academy Sandhurst and was commissioned a second lieutenant in the Duke of Wellington's Regiment on 8 February 1952. He was given the service number 420858. He served as a platoon commander in the latter stages of the Korean War. He was promoted to lieutenant on 8 February 1954, captain on 8 February 1958, was appointed a Member of the Order of the British Empire in the 1961 Queen's Birthday Honours, and made major on 8 February 1965. In 1967 he served as a Company Commander in Cyprus. Huxtable was promoted to lieutenant colonel on 30 June 1969, and commanded the regiment from 13 May 1970 to 7 December 1972.

Huxtable became Commander of Land Forces in Northern Ireland in 1980, Director of Army Staff Duties in 1982, and then Commander of Training and Arms Directors at the Ministry of Defence in 1983. He went on to be Quartermaster-General in 1986 and Commander-in-Chief, Land Forces in 1988 before retiring in 1990.

Huxtable held the colonelcy of the Duke of Wellington's Regiment from 1982 to 1990 and was Colonel Commandant of the Ulster Defence Regiment from 1991 until 1992. He then served as the first Colonel of the Royal Irish Regiment from 1992 to 1996.

== Later life ==
In retirement Huxtable served as a member of the Prime Minister's Advisory Committee on Business Appointments. He died on 26 November 2018.

Military offices
Preceded by Sir Richard Trant	Quartermaster-General to the Forces; 1986–1988	Succeeded by Sir Edward Jones
Preceded by Sir John Chapple	Commander in Chief, UK Land Forces; 1988–1990	Succeeded by Sir John Waters
