= Dennis Faulkner =

CBE VRD UD DL Dennis Faulkner
- Born: 22 October 1926
- Died: 31 December 2016 (aged 90); County Down, Northern Ireland
- Military career
- Allegiance: United Kingdom
- Branch: Royal Navy; British Army
- Commands: Ulster Defence Regiment: 3rd Battalion, Ulster Defence Regiment

Colonel Sir James Dennis Compton Faulkner CBE VRD UD DL (22 October 1926 – 31 December 2016) was a Northern Irish officer, who served in the Royal Navy and British Army. He was the Regimental Colonel of the Ulster Defence Regiment from 1982 to 1992.

== Life ==
Born on 22 October 1926, Faulkner was the brother of the former Northern Ireland Prime Minister Brian Faulkner. He served from 1946 to 1971 in the Royal Naval Volunteer Reserve, and reached the rank of lieutenant commander. He was then commissioned into the Ulster Defence Regiment (UDR) where he commanded the Boat Section of the 3rd (Co Down) Battalion. He ended his military career as Regimental Colonel of the UDR, serving from 1982 to 1992.

He was made a Commander of the Order of the British Empire (CBE) in the 1980 Birthday Honours and knighted in the 1991 New Year Honours. He held the office of Deputy Lieutenant (DL) to the Lord Lieutenant of County Down from 1988.

He died on 31 December 2016 at the age of 90.
