= John Anderson (British Army officer, born 1908) =

British Army officer

General Sir John Anderson GBE KCB DSO
- John Anderson, c. 1960s
- Born: 23 September 1908; Downpatrick, Ireland
- Died: 16 April 1988 (aged 79); Ealing, London
- Military career
- Allegiance: United Kingdom
- Branch: British Army
- Service years: 1929–1968
- Rank: General
- Service number: 42399
- Unit: 5th Royal Inniskilling Dragoon Guards
- Commands: Imperial Defence College; Royal Armoured Corps; 11th Armoured Division
- Conflicts: Second World War
- Awards: Knight Grand Cross of the Order of the British Empire; Knight Commander of the Order of the Bath; Companion of the Distinguished Service Order

General Sir John D'Arcy Anderson, GBE, KCB, DSO (23 September 1908 – 16 April 1988) was a British Army officer who reached high office in the 1960s.

== Early life ==
John D'Arcy Anderson was born on 23 September 1908 in Downpatrick, Ireland, the only son of Reginald D'Arcy Anderson. He was educated at Winchester College and New College, Oxford.

== Military career ==
Anderson was commissioned into the 5th Royal Inniskilling Dragoon Guards in 1929. He served in the Second World War in France, the Middle East and Italy.

After the war Anderson was appointed commanding officer of the 25th Armoured Brigade in 1952, promoted to general officer commanding 11th Armoured Division in Germany in 1955 and then became chief of staff at Headquarters Northern Army Group and British Army of the Rhine in 1956. He became director of the Royal Armoured Corps in 1958 and director general of military training at the War Office in 1959.

Anderson was appointed deputy chief of Imperial General Staff in 1961 and military secretary in 1963. Finally he became commandant of the Imperial Defence College in 1966; he retired in 1968. He was appointed a Knight Commander of the Order of the Bath in the 1961 New Year Honours.

Anderson was also the first colonel commandant of Ulster Defence Regiment from 1969 to 1979. In that capacity he escorted the Queen during her Silver Jubilee visit to Northern Ireland in 1977. A purpose-built operations centre for the UDR was built at Ballykinler army base and named in honour of the general who was known as "The father of the UDR".

From 1962 to 1967 Anderson was colonel of the 5th Royal Inniskilling Dragoon Guards.

== Public service ==
Anderson was appointed High Sheriff of County Down for 1974.

== Family life ==
Anderson married Elizabeth Antoinette Merrifield Walker. They had no children.

Military offices
| Preceded by Harold Pyman | GOC 11th Armoured Division; 1955–1956 | Succeeded by Reginald Hewetson |
| Preceded by Sir Harold Pyman | Deputy Chief of the Imperial General Staff; 1961–1963 | Succeeded by Sir John Hackett |
| Preceded by Sir William Stirling | Military Secretary; 1963–1966 | Succeeded by Sir Richard Goodwin |
| Preceded by Sir Deric Holland-Martin | Commandant of the Imperial Defence College; 1966–1968 | Succeeded by Sir Donald Evans |
