= Quis separabit? =

Latin motto meaning "who will separate?"

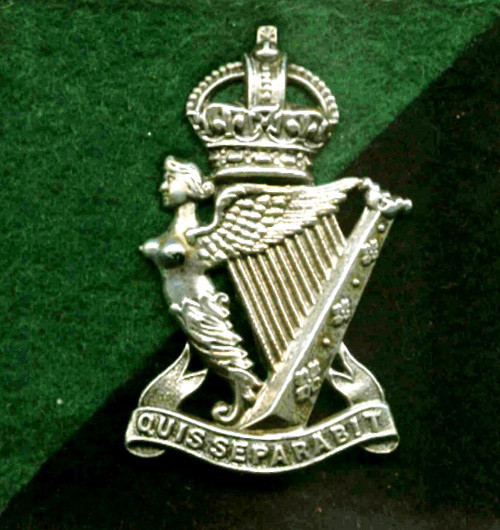
Cap badge of the Royal Ulster Rifles

Quis separabit? – Irish Guards drummer's full dress

Quis separabit? (Who will separate [us]?) is a Latin motto derived from the Vulgate translation of Romans 8:35:

"Quis ergō nōs sēparābit ā cāritāte Christī...",

translated into English as "Who shall separate us from the love of Christ?" (Note: Text in Greek: τίς ἡμᾶς χωρίσει ἀπὸ τῆς ἀγάπης τοῦ Χριστοῦ, tís hēmâs chōrísei apò tês agápēs toû Christoû.)

== Use as a motto ==
The motto is associated with Ulster unionism, Ulster loyalism and the British Army in Ireland: for example, it is used in the British Army by the Royal Dragoon Guards, the Royal Ulster Rifles, the London Irish Rifles, the Irish Guards, and the North Irish Horse, and it is also the motto of the Order of Saint Patrick. The phrase also appears on the Seal of South Carolina and is inscribed on the alumnus ring of Clemson University.

It was the motto of the 4th/7th Royal Dragoon Guards, a cavalry regiment of the British Army from 1922 to 1992. It was also the motto of the Connaught Rangers, an Irish regiment of the British Army, from its amalgamation in 1881 until it was disbanded in 1922. Prior to this, it was the motto of the precursor regiment of the Rangers, the 88th Regiment of Foot (Connaught Rangers) which was founded in 1793. It was also the motto of the Ulster Defence Regiment and the 5th Royal Irish Lancers.

It was the motto of the former Government of Northern Ireland and appeared on the province's defunct coat of arms. It is also the motto of the Ulster Defence Association, a loyalist paramilitary group in Northern Ireland.

The full quotation from Romans 8:35, Quis nos separabit a caritate Christi? is the motto of Cardinal Pietro Parolin, the present Cardinal Secretary of State.
