= Sinton (surname) =

Sinton is a surname. Notable people with the surname include:

- Andy Sinton (born 1966), English footballer and manager
- David Sinton, Irish born industrialist in Ohio
- David Sinton Ingalls, American politician, great-grandson of David Sinton
- John Alexander Sinton, Irish soldier and winner of the Victoria Cross (first cousin once-removed of Maynard Sinton)
- John Sinton (1835–1890), Irish-linen manufacturer; younger brother of Thomas Sinton, grandfather of John Alexander Sinton
- Les Sinton, English footballer
- Maynard Sinton, son of Thomas Sinton
- Nell Sinton (1910–1997), American painter
- Thomas Sinton, Irish linen industrialist (cousin of David Sinton), great-uncle of John Alexander Sinton
