= Maynard Sinton =

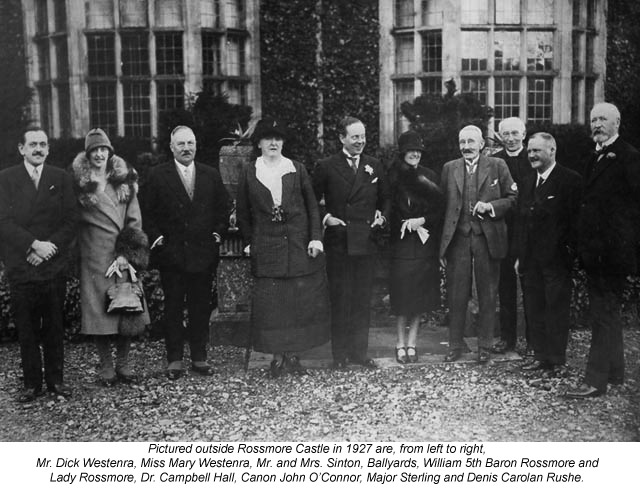
Maynard Sinton, third from left, at the wedding of Lord Rossmore at Rossmore Castle, 1927.

William Maynard Sinton JP (1 February 1860 – 31 December 1942) was High Sheriff of County Armagh, an Ulster Unionist County Councillor for Armagh and industrialist.

Sinton was the eldest son, and heir, of Thomas Sinton of Laurelvale House. His father founded the family linen firm of Thomas Sinton & Co. Ltd. (flax spinners). Maynard Sinton attended school at Kendal, Westmoreland and at Newtown School, Waterford. Sinton's uncle was the linen manufacturer John Sinton owner of the Ravarnette Weaving Company; his cousin, a grandson of the same John Sinton, was the Victoria Cross winner John Alexander Sinton. He continued to manage the firm following his father's death and took up residence at Ballyards Castle, Armagh.

Sinton married, on 16 March 1905 at Tandragee, Myra Atkinson, of Park View, Tandragee, daughter of William H. Atkinson, solicitor and sometime agent to the Duke of Manchester; J. Charters Boyle, JP was best man. The couple had two children,

- Bridget Maynard Sinton (1914–1998) (m. 1943, James Engledow, of the Army Intelligence Corps, at Armagh Cathedral);
- Second Lieutenant Maynard Bunbury Sinton (1916–1940) (ed. Radley College and the Royal Military Academy Sandhurst), killed in action during the Battle of the Ypres–Comines Canal with the Royal Scots Fusiliers and posthumously Mentioned in Dispatches.

Before the Second World War the family employed over 20 staff on the estate including two chauffeurs, a governess (a Miss Glenda Rowe), cooks, servants and gardeners. They kept racehorses and a pack of beagles, as Mr. Sinton was a leading light at 'big shoots' and Irish gun dog trials. The Ballyards cup was presented every year at the Armagh point-to-point races.

Ballyards Castle

One of the first owners of a motor car in the county the registration on his Clement was IB 1. In 1893 he was the guest-of-honour at the opening of County Armagh Golf Club. He was a member of the Royal Irish Automobile Club, the United Service Club, Dublin, Stephen's Green Club, Dublin, the Union Club, Belfast and the County, Armagh.

Upon his death, without a male heir, his main business interests passed to his brother, Frederick Buckby Sinton, of Banford House, Tullylish. Maynard Sinton was buried at the Friends' (Quaker) Meeting House, Moyallon, near Gilford. The Sintons retained the Ballyards estate until the late 1950s and, in the early 1960s, the castle became the home, for a few years, of Vernon College, a boarding school for boys formerly situate at Dunmurry.
