= 2nd Battalion, Ulster Defence Regiment =

- Ulster Defence Regiment crest
- Active: 1970–1992
- Country: United Kingdom
- Branch: British Army
- Type: Infantry battalion
- Role: Internal Security
- Size: 456
- Regimental Headquarters: Lisburn (1992)
- Mottos: "Quis Separabit" (Latin) "Who Shall Separate Us?"
- March: (Quick) Garryowen & Sprig of Shillelagh. (Slow) Oft in the Stilly Night

Commanders
- Colonel Commandant: First: General Sir John Anderson GBE, KCB, DSO; Last: General Sir Charles Huxtable, KCB, CBE, DL
- Colonel of the Regiment: Colonel Sir Dennis Faulkner CBE

2nd (County Armagh) Battalion, Ulster Defence Regiment (2 UDR) was formed in 1970 as part of the seven original battalions specified in the Ulster Defence Regiment Act 1969, which received royal assent on 18 December 1969 and was brought into force on 1 January 1970. It was, along with the rest of the regiment, amalgamated with the Royal Irish Rangers in 1992 to form the Royal Irish Regiment. It had previously been amalgamated in 1991 with the 11th Battalion Ulster Defence Regiment to form the 2nd/11th Battalion Ulster Defence Regiment.

== History ==
The raising of citizen militias has a history in Ireland stretching back to the creation of the Irish Militia in 1793. The raising of UDR battalions on a county basis followed the pattern of raising militias.

Along with the other six original battalions, 2 UDR commenced operational duties on 1 April 1970.

Headquarters was originally in the ancient Gough Barracks in Armagh City, formerly home to the Depot, Royal Irish Fusiliers, but was later moved to purpose-built accommodation on a new site on the Hamiltonsbawn Road called Drumadd Barracks which was shared with the regular army and also later served as an HQ for 3 Infantry Brigade. At various times the battalion had companies in Armagh, Loughgall, Glenanne, and Lurgan, plus platoons in Keady and Newtownhamilton.

Lieutenant Colonel Michael Torrens-Spence, previously County Commandant for County Armagh of the Ulster Special Constabulary, (B Specials) was the first commanding officer and served from 1970 to 1972.

Major P.R. Adair, Coldstream Guards, was the first training major (TISO). Part of his job was to find accommodation for the new companies of the battalion. Where possible accommodation was sought in army bases and although the old Ulster Special Constabulary platoon huts were vacant and available, to have used those would have highlighted further the links between the UDR and the disbanded USC.

Due to its location and patrol territory in the "bandit country" of South Armagh, this was one of the most heavily engaged battalions of the Ulster Defence Regiment and had the longest list of casualties. The battalion was always understrength as a result the decision was taken in 1982 when the permanent cadre had dropped to 184, to transfer an entire platoon from 9 UDR (who were patrolling one of the quietest areas in the province) into the 2nd battalion. This wasn't as straightforward as transferring soldiers from regular units as UDR soldiers lived at home and their barracks had very limited accommodation, but it was effected successfully.

2 UDR was responsible for 650 square kilometres (250 mi^{2}) of County Armagh, the smallest UDR battalion area but the most dangerous area during the Troubles for British military personnel.

The battalion provided the station guard for the Royal Ulster Constabulary barracks at Bessbrook. On one occasion when a proxy bomb arrived at the barracks, they had to clear the area and carry several children to safety before the 30 pounds (14 kg) device exploded.

=== Appointment of NCOs ===
The appointment of non-commissioned officers (NCOs) was carried out by the enlisted men, choosing who they felt would make the best corporals and sergeants. The filling of senior NCO posts in this manner had a drawback, in that many men of comparatively young ages who had considerable years of service before retirement or promotion created a "promotion block".

== Notable members ==
- Robert McConnell — a 2nd Battalion UDR corporal. The Barron Report lists him as one of the suspects in the 1974 Dublin bombings. He had alleged links to RUC Special Branch and the British Intelligence Corps, and it was claimed he was controlled before and after the bombings by Robert Nairac. McConnell was named by both Lily Shields and Laurence McClure as being involved in the 1975 Donnelly's Bar killings. John Weir states McConnell took part in the John Francis Green shooting, along with Robin Jackson and Harris Boyle. He was named by Weir as the leading gunman in the Reavey family shootings. McConnell was killed by the IRA on 5 April 1976.

== Intimidation ==
Protestant and Catholic soldiers were both intimidated out of the regiment. Following the introduction of internment however more Catholic soldiers found themselves the subject of intimidation from within their own community. A corporal from 2 UDR was threatened that his mother would be burnt out if he did not leave the regiment.

== Uniform, armament & equipment ==
See: Ulster Defence Regiment Uniform, armament & equipment

== Greenfinches ==
The first Greenfinch (female soldier) was enlisted at the battalion's Headquarters (HQ) in Armagh on 16 September 1973. By 1991 she had risen to the rank of Warrant Officer.

== Destruction of Glenanne Barracks ==
See also: Glenanne barracks bombing and Ulster Defence Regiment

Two companies of the 2nd Battalion were based at the border outpost of Glenanne Barracks which had been built in 1972. Prior to the attack, seven had already been killed while serving.

At 11:30 PM on 31 May 1991, a truck loaded with 2,000 pounds (910 kg) of a new type of home made explosive was rolled (driverless) down a hill at the rear of the barracks and crashed through the perimeter fence, coming to rest against a corner of the main building. According to a witness, in addition to the truck, there was a Toyota Hiace van carrying at least two men acting as a support vehicle. They were seen outside the parked van, masked and armed; one with a handgun, the other with a submachine gun. Automatic fire was heard by other witnesses just before the main blast. It was later determined that the lorry had been stolen the day before in Kingscourt, in the Republic of Ireland.

The bomb crater was 200 feet (61 m) deep; the blast threw debris and shrapnel as far as 300 yards (270 m). The explosion was heard over 30 miles (48 km) away in Dundalk. It was the largest bomb detonated by the IRA until that point in time. Most of the base was destroyed by the blast and the fire that followed. There was also substantial damage to local dwelling houses and other buildings.

The barracks guard was usually eight soldiers, but that night there were 40 people in the barracks, attending a social event. Three soldiers: Lance Corporal Robert Crozier age 46, Private Sydney Hamilton age 44 and Private Paul Blakely age 30, died instantly and ten were wounded. Four civilians were also wounded.

The Provisional IRA claimed responsibility two days later.

The base was never rebuilt. All that remains is a line of trees marking where the main gate stood and a memorial by the main road inscribed with the names of all the UDR soldiers from the base who were killed whilst serving there.

== Casualties ==
2 UDR had the highest casualty rate of all the UDR battalions, losing 65 men and women on active duty.

The first recorded use of the Provisional Irish Republican Army's Mk12 device fired horizontally was against a mobile patrol from 2 UDR on 1 March 1991. Two soldiers died as a result of the attack. The funeral of one of them, Private Paul Sutcliffe, an Englishman, was held in Barrowford, Lancashire - the only UDR funeral to be held outside Northern Ireland. The second casualty, Private Roger Love, from Portadown, died after three days. His kidneys were donated to the NHS.

== Amalgamation ==
The numbers in the battalion fell so low that it was decided, under the "Project Infancy" Options for Change recommendations, to amalgamate it with the 11th (Craigavon) Battalion. This took place on 30 September 1991, forming 2nd/11th (County Armagh) Battalion, based at Mahon Road Barracks, Portadown but retaining companies in Drumadd Barracks, Armagh.

== Notable personnel ==
- The UDR Four
- Category:Ulster Defence Regiment soldiers
- Category:Ulster Defence Regiment officers

== See also ==
- List of battalions and locations of the Ulster Defence Regiment

== Bibliography ==
- A Testimony to Courage – the Regimental History of the Ulster Defence Regiment 1969–1992, John Potter, Pen & Sword Books Ltd, 2001, ISBN 0-85052-819-4
- The Ulster Defence Regiment: An Instrument of Peace?, Chris Ryder 1991 ISBN 0-413-64800-1
- Lost Lives, David McKittrick, Mainstream, 2004, ISBN 184018504X
