= Sintons' Mill =

Sintons' Mill is an abandoned linen factory, dating to 1865, located by the Cusher River in Tandragee, County Armagh, Northern Ireland.

== History ==
The mill, dating back to 1865 as a corn mill, was subsequently leased by James Rowlie and Robert Davis, who transformed it into a flax spinning mill known as the Tandragee Flax Spinning Company. This enterprise was unsuccessful, leading to the business entering liquidation in 1871. Following this, Thomas Sinton acquired the property, including its machinery, as part of the expansion of his company from its original location in nearby Laurelvale.

In the 1880s, it stood as the predominant employer in Tandragee, providing jobs for over 600 individuals, with nearly every household in the town depending on it for their income. A horn would sound across Tandragee, signalling the workers to begin work at 6:00AM. This sound was able to be heard in Acton, located four miles away from the mill.

Although the mill was located beside the Cusher River, it did not use water power for its operations. Instead, a steam engine powered the machinery. The coal required for this engine was transported from Newry through the Newry Canal. Local small farmers were contracted to retrieve this coal from The Madden (Tandragee Harbour).

In 1996, approximately 200 individuals were employed at the mill; however, the decline in the textile industry resulted in the complex having to shut down.

== 21st century ==
In 2002, plans were underway to transform the mill, still owned by the Sinton family, into a tourist and retail destination, aiming for an investment of £7 to £8 million. Planning permission was approved for this project; however, the property was listed for sale in 2003.

The Grade B2 listed mill building experienced an arson attack on 29 October 2024 with the response of firefighters in 4 appliances, supported by a specialist aerial unit and a water carrier vehicle from the Northern Ireland Fire and Rescue Service.
