= John Sinton =

John Sinton, JP, (born 1 November 1835 in Tamnaghmore House, County Armagh; died 13 September 1890 in Ravernet, County Down), was an Ulster Scot industrialist, philanthropist and Quaker. He was the seventh child of nine born to David Sinton (1792–1860) and Sarah Green (1795–1856). Belonging to a large and well-known family descended from the Ulster-Scots Benjamin Cynton (1640–?), John Sinton purchased a linen mill at Ravarnet (sometimes spelled Ravernet or Ravarnette), County Down, close to Lisburn, County Down, in 1873, and established another one at nearby Drumnavaddy. He was the younger brother of Thomas Sinton (1826–1887), linen manufacturer and Quaker philanthropist, who created the new village at Laurelvale, County Armagh, in the 1850s, and cousin of industrialist David Sinton of Cincinnati, once one of the richest men in America.

On 21 May 1857, Sinton married Eleanor Hemington at the Friends' Meeting House at Chatteris, Cambridgeshire. They had six children, among them Walter Lyon Sinton (1858–1933), father of John Alexander Sinton, winner of the Victoria Cross (1916), and Caroline Sinton (1860–1918), grandmother of Lawrence John Hobson, O.B.E., C.M.G. (1922–1991), sometime Political Adviser to the High Commissioner for Aden and the Protectorate of South Arabia.

John Sinton probably worked with his brother Thomas at Laurelvale until the 1870s, when he developed the mill at Ravernet, and built houses and a schoolroom there to accommodate his employees and their families. Sinton devoted all his energy to the Ravarnette Weaving Company, which, at his death in 1890, was taken over in partnership by his youngest son, Edwin (1872–1935), and Benjamin Courtenay Hobson (1862–1935), the husband of Caroline. On his death his estate was valued at £12,919. Sinton and Hobson ran the Ravarnette Weaving Company with great success by developing a form of linen cloth that was used to cover the fuselage of the earliest aeroplanes. However, on 10 October 1927, the company was wound up due to an overload of stock that was unable to be paid for by a bankrupted American firm.
