= Sinton =

Sinton may refer to:

- Sinton (surname)
- Sinton, Texas, a town named after David Sinton
- Sinton, an impact crater on Mars

== See also ==
- Synton Fenix, a manufacturer and distributor of high-end electronic music equipment in the Netherlands
- Senton, a type of strike move in professional wrestling
