= Gough Barracks =

Military building in Armagh, Northern Ireland

- Armagh, Northern Ireland
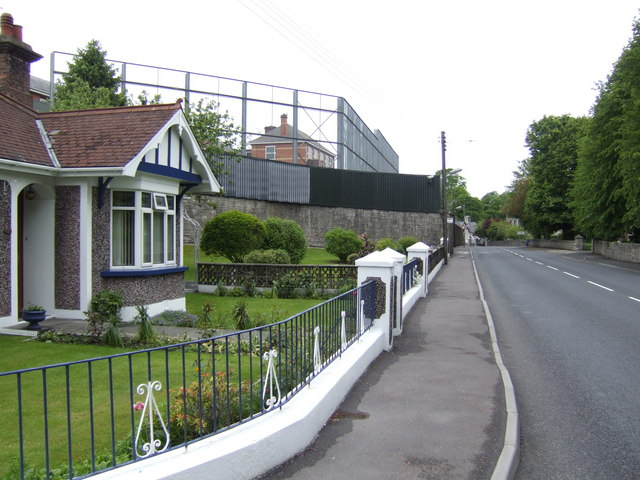
- Gough Barracks visible on the left beyond the bungalow

Site information
- Type: Barracks
- Owner: Ministry of Defence
- Operator: British Army

Location
- Location within Northern Ireland
- Coordinates: 54.34892°N 6.64293°W

Site history
- Built: 1773
- In use: 1773-1960; 1970-1976

Garrison information
- Occupants: Royal Irish Fusiliers

Gough Barracks was a military installation in Armagh, Northern Ireland.

== History ==
The barracks were first established on the site in 1773. In 1873 a system of recruiting areas based on counties was instituted under the Cardwell Reforms and the barracks became the depot for the 89th (Princess Victoria's) Regiment of Foot and the 94th Regiment of Foot. Following the Childers Reforms, the 87th (Prince of Wales's Irish) Regiment of Foot and the 89th (The Princess Victoria's) Regiment of Foot amalgamated to form the Royal Irish Fusiliers with its depot in the barracks in 1881.

During the Second World War the barracks were used as military accommodation by the United States Army. In 1954 an Irish Republican Army unit raided the barracks and seized 340 rifles, 50 Sten guns, 12 Bren guns and a number of small arms. On the night of 12 December 1956 the barracks was attacked again during the IRA's Border Campaign. The barracks were closed as a depot of the Royal Irish Fusiliers in April 1960.

In 1970 Gough Barracks was re-opened as the Headquarters for the 2nd Battalion, Ulster Defence Regiment: the battalion remained there until they moved out to more modern facilities Drumadd Barracks in 1975. The premises were then vacated completely by the British Army in 1976.

A nuclear bunker was established at the site during the Cold War and it continues to be used as a policing base by the Police Service of Northern Ireland.

== Sources ==
- Potter, John (2001). Testimony to Courage: The History of the Ulster Defence Regiment 1969-1992. Pen & Sword Books. ISBN 978-0850528190.
