= 11th Battalion, Ulster Defence Regiment =

Formation of the Land Forces in Northern Ireland (CLFNI)

11th (Craigavon) Battalion, Ulster Defence Regiment
- Regimental Insignia
- Active: 1970–1992
- Country: United Kingdom
- Branch: British Army
- Type: Infantry battalion
- Role: Internal Security
- Size: 772
- Regimental Headquarters: Lisburn
- Mottos: "Quis Separabit" (Latin) "Who Shall Separate Us?"
- March: (Quick) Garryowen & Sprig of Shillelagh. (Slow) Oft in the Stilly Night

Commanders
- Colonel Commandant: First: General Sir John Anderson GBE, KCB, DSO. Last: General Sir Charles Huxtable, KCB, CBE, DL
- Colonel of the Regiment: Colonel Sir Dennis Faulkner CBE

The 11th (Craigavon) Battalion, Ulster Defence Regiment was formed from companies of the 2nd Battalion Ulster Defence Regiment (2 UDR) and the 3rd Battalion Ulster Defence Regiment in 1972. In 1991 under the reductions planned in Options for Change by the British Army, it again amalgamated with 2 UDR to form the 2nd/11th Battalion Ulster Defence Regiment.

== Formation ==
The battalion was formed in 1972 after an announcement by Major General Robert Ford, Commander Land Forces in Northern Ireland (CLFNI). The raising of the new and final battalion of the UDR brought operational strength up to 9,000 men, making the regiment not only the youngest but largest infantry battalion in the British Army.

The new battalion was commanded by Lieutenant Colonel Robin Chappell, who had previously been commander of the neighbouring 2 UDR. He was the first regular officer to command the 2nd battalion, and the only regular officer ever to command two separate UDR battalions.

In 1990 11 UDR was reported as having 772 members who patrolled an area of 1,500 square kilometres (580 mi^{2}).

== Barracks ==
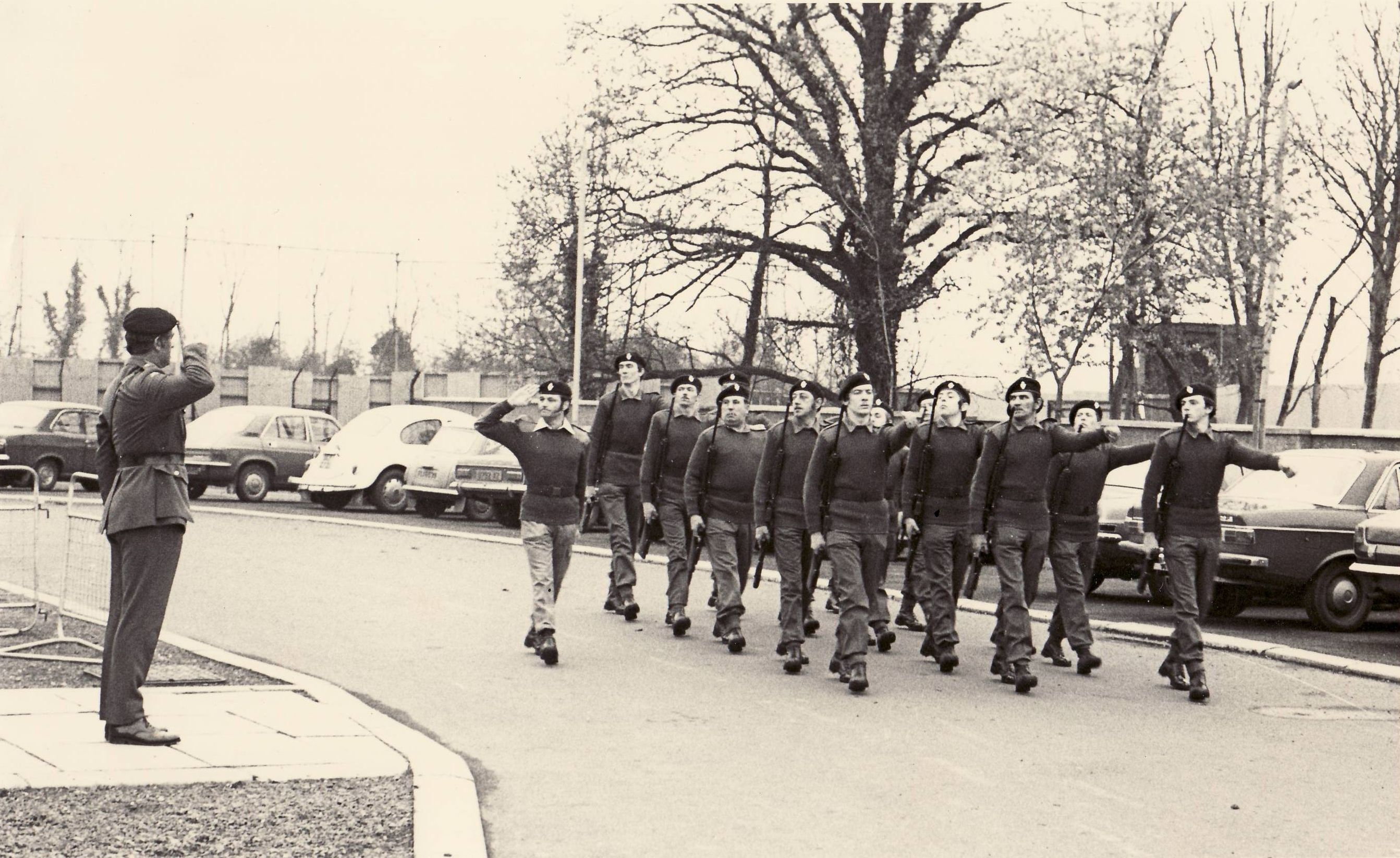
A platoon of UDR soldiers salute their commanding officer at Mahon Barracks

From formation battalion HQ was based at Mahon Road Barracks, known by the troops as "Fort Mahon", a new purpose-built UDR base on the Mahon Road, Portadown beside the historic Mahon House. Assuming command and expanding platoons and companies once part of the Armagh based 2 UDR in Lurgan, Portadown and Tandragee and also the Banbridge Company of 3 UDR.

== Companies ==
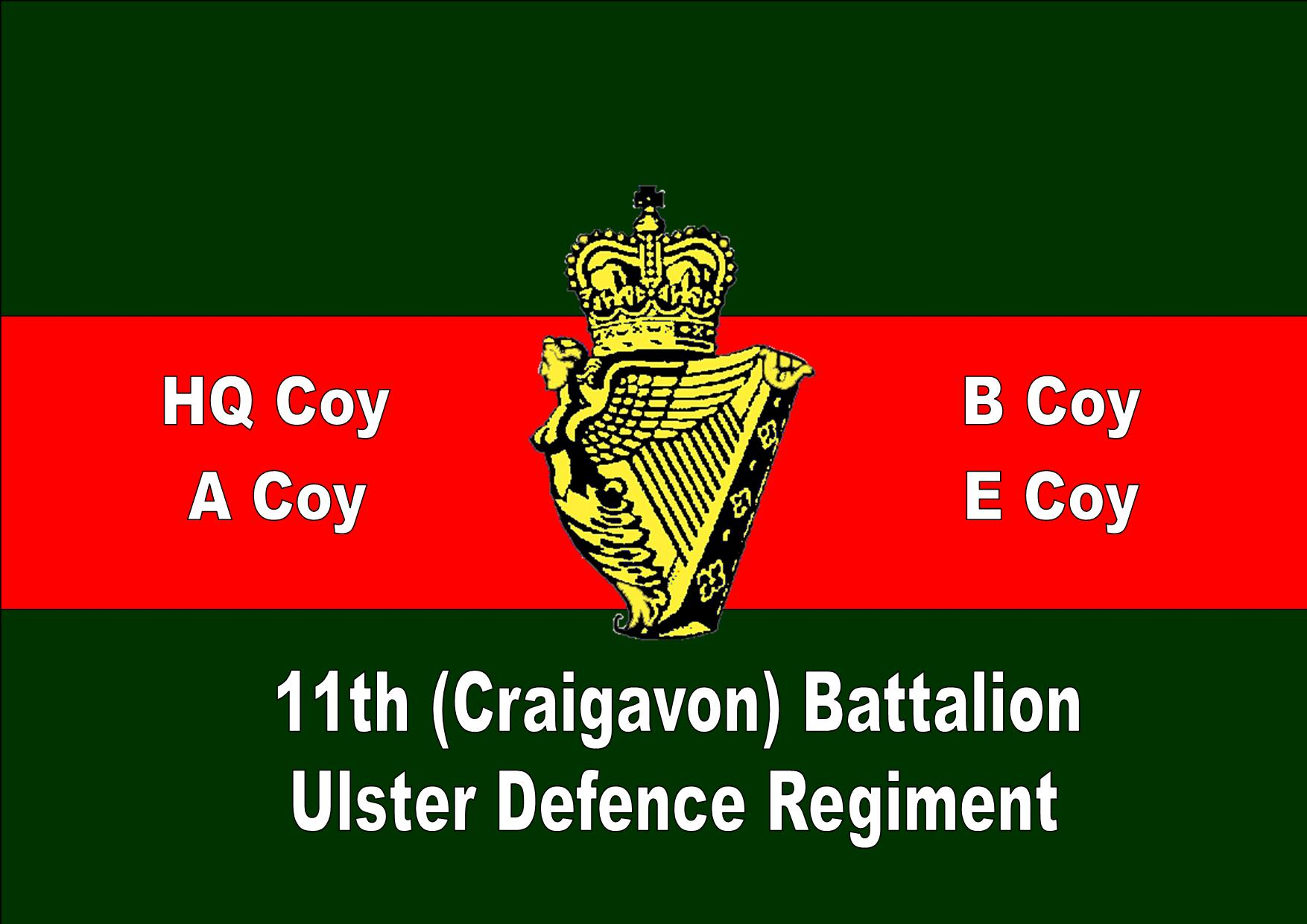
Main Gate sign from Mahon Barracks

=== HQ Company ===
Mahon Barracks, Portadown. – a mixture of regular army and permanent cadre/part-time administration staff, instructors, watchkeepers, mechanics, and a guard force of Conrate soldiers. The commander was the battalion commander who was a regular lieutenant colonel. Other regular soldiers on attachment included the adjutant (a major), a training major, and permanent staff instructors. The Quartermaster's stores were also part of this company as were the core services of the battalion which, although modified slightly on expansion, generally consisted of operational organisation, vehicles, radio services, catering and pay.

=== HQ Company (Operations Platoon) ===
Scarva Road Barracks, Banbridge – an experimental permanent cadre platoon formed after Ulsterisation which carried out the same duties as the regular army. Selected from the youngest and fittest soldiers with Commanders and NCO's who had, where possible, previous military experience. The commander was a Scottish WO2 who had 22 years of experience with the Royal Highland Fusiliers, fighting in colonial conflicts during the disestablishment of empire. His second in command was Colour Sergeant Robert (Bob) Beattie (Father of Captain Doug Beattie) who had fought in the Congo Crisis and in Cyprus with the Royal Ulster Rifles. The main duties were to quickly seal off the A1 Belfast – Dublin dual carriageway and to act as Quick Reaction Force (QRF) for 3 Infantry Brigade and RUC J Division. As the number of permanent cadre soldiers grew a new full-time company was formed at Portadown and the Operations Platoon was integrated into it taking the designation A Company.

=== A Coy (Tandragee) ===
Based at Mahon Barracks – a part-time company. Later renamed B Company. Drawn from men (and later women) from the village of Tandragee and the surrounding area this company came on duty at 7 pm on weekdays and all day on weekends. In addition to patrolling their own villages and rural areas, they were also responsible for the relief of the regular army on the permanent guard post at Tandragee Power Station.

=== B Coy ===
(Dromore) was never formed but the designation was later given to A (Tandragee) Coy when the full-time rifle company was established at Portadown from the Operations Platoon and designated "A Company".

=== C Coy (Lurgan) ===
Kitchen Hill Barracks, Lurgan. – a part-time company with a small permanent cadre staff who ran the UDR centre within the regular army's barracks. This company was responsible for patrolling the town of Lurgan and its surrounding villages and rural areas.

==== Arms raid ====
Subsequent to a raid against C Company, on 20 October 1972, the guard commander Sgt Billy Hanna MM was convicted of supplying information to loyalist paramilitaries. Most were recovered in follow up operations but some were later proven to have been used by loyalist organisations to carry out crime, including murders.

=== D Coy (Banbridge) ===
Scarva Road Barracks, Banbridge – a part-time company with a small permanent cadre staff who administered and guarded the barracks. Drawing its recruits from Banbridge, Dromore and surrounding rural villages and areas the company also patrolled these areas and provided extra checkpoints on the A1 dual carriageway.

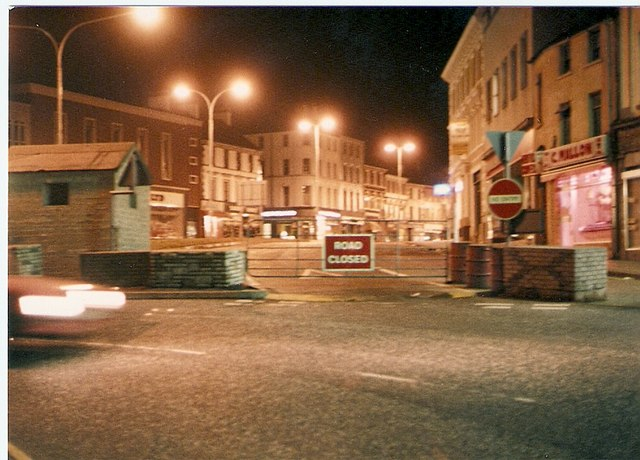
The gated off centre of Portadown - guarded by E Coy, 11UDR

=== E Coy (Portadown) ===
A part-time company with a small nucleus of permanent cadre administrative staff drawn from the market town of Portadown and its surrounding villages and rural areas. The company provided patrols in the town and surrounding areas as well as the night guard on the telephone exchange at Edenderry.

=== F Coy (Lisburn) ===
After the amalgamation of 1 and 9 UDR in 1984 – a part-time company with a small nucleus of permanent cadre administration staff who ran the company offices and facilities within Thiepval Barracks. Recruiting from Lisburn and surrounding areas it too had a mixed patrol area of towns and villages but by its location also patrolled areas of south Belfast.

== Area of responsibility ==
RUC J Division – taking in the sub-divisions of:

A soldier of 2 Platoon, A Coy, 11 UDR, armed with a 9mm pistol, checks vehicles at the permanent checkpoint outside Newtownhamilton RUC Station – December 1985

- MAHON ROAD: Divisional Command and barracks in Portadown Subdivision.
- PORTADOWN: Subdivisional Command.
- LURGAN: Subdivisional Command.
- MOIRA: Barracks in Lurgan Subdivision.
- CRAIGAVON: Barracks in Lurgan Subdivision.
- BANBRIDGE: Subdivisional Command.
- DROMORE: Barracks in Banbridge Subdivision.
- DROMARA: Barracks in Banbridge Subdivision.
- GILFORD: Barracks in Banbndge Subdivision.
- RATHFRILAND: Barracks in Banbridge Subdivision. (3 UDR were responsible for Rathfriland town)

Both part-time and full-time companies of 11 UDR took over operational responsibility in other areas to relieve the pressure on border battalions who had taken heavy casualties, particularly 2 UDR. Part-time soldiers deployed for a weekend but the full-time Operations Platoon (later A Company) and elements of HQ Company Conrate Guard deployed for up to two weeks at a time. Some of these detachments were at:

- Bessbrook
- Newtownhamilton
- Caledon
- Keady
- Middletown
- Omeath

As well as manning permanent vehicle checkpoints (PVCPs) at these location the 11 UDR Platoons also engaged in urban and rural patrol work with the full-time soldiers taking part in searches, observation activities and denial of territory to the enemy.

== Casualties ==
The battalion lost nine men during its existence. A further eight were killed as a result of their membership after they had left the battalion. No figures are available for those wounded.

== The Miami killings ==
Two soldiers from the 11 UDR's C Company, (also UVF members), were convicted of the 1975 killing of three musicians from the Irish showband, the Miami. This attack was led by Robin Jackson, a former ii UDR soldier who had been discharged for "undisclosed reasons". Two soldiers from 11 UDR's E Company, Portadown(also UVF members), died in the premature explosion of their own bomb.

== See also ==
- Ulster Defence Regiment
- List of battalions and locations of the Ulster Defence Regiment
- Category:Ulster Defence Regiment soldiers
- Category:Ulster Defence Regiment officers

== Bibliography ==
- A Testimony to Courage – the Regimental History of the Ulster Defence Regiment 1969 – 1992, John Potter, Pen & Sword Books Ltd, 2001, ISBN 0-85052-819-4
- The Ulster Defence Regiment: An Instrument of Peace?, Chris Ryder 1991 ISBN 0-413-64800-1
- Lost Lives, David McKittrick, Mainstream, 2004, ISBN 184018504X
- Echo Company, The History of E Company 5th Battalion of the Ulster Defence Regiment, by Ronnie Gamble 2007. ISBN 978-0-9558069-0-2
