= White's Mill (Tandragee) =

Coordinates: 54.349206°N 6.408560°W

White's Mill is a corn mill, owned by White's Speedicook, along the banks of the Cusher River in Tandragee, County Armagh, Northern Ireland.

== History ==
Thomas Henry White founded the mill in 1841, operating under the name T.H. White Miller, primarily focusing on corn and flour milling. The mill utilised a vertical water wheel for its power source. In 1850, the flour milling operations were relocated from Tandragee to Clarendon Mills on Henry Street in Belfast. At this new site, the company also manufactured animal feed and flaked rice, allowing the Tandragee facility to concentrate solely on corn (oat) milling. Subsequently, the business adopted the name T.H. White & Co.

In 1890, the introduction of advanced machinery in the mill enabled White’s to manufacture and patent an exceptionally thin rolled flake, the first of its kind. It was noted that this product "dominates the market and remains unmatched, distinguished by its purity, flake size, and flavor."

In 1897, White's merged with Tomkins & Courage, evolving into a significant modern enterprise known as White's, Tomkins & Courage. This transition was led by Thomas Henry White Jr. until his son, Alwyn Henry White, assumed leadership in 1930.

White's introduced a Speedicook version of their wafer oatmeal in 1920, featuring a kibbled oat that allowed for faster cooking. This new flake was designed to cook in the same duration as it took to boil water in a kettle. It was made available in packaging options of 1lb boxes, as well as 2lb and 3.5lb bags. In 1984, White's commenced operations as White's Speedicook Ltd, led by four local entrepreneurs: Sam Cunningham, Jo Cunningham, Walter Smith, and Maurice Taylor. During this period, the Speedicook brand thrived nationwide.

== 21st century ==
Fane Valley contracted White's Speedicook in 1990 and continues to operate under the same ownership in the 21st century. An investment of £2.5 million was made to transform the mill in Tandragee into an advanced milling facility. Additionally, significant funding for new product development has enhanced White’s product range. It has established itself as a leading brand in the market, receiving multiple awards for its porridge and oat cereal products.

In February 2023, Armagh City, Banbridge and Craigavon Borough Council approved plans for White's Oat's to move to new premises in Craigavon.
