= Michael Torrens-Spence =

Royal Navy Captain and Fleet Air Arm pilot (1914–2001)

Captain Michael Torrens-Spence DSO DSC AFC
- Born: 10 March 1914; Whiteabbey, County Antrim, Ireland
- Died: 12 December 2001 (aged 87); Northern Ireland
- Military career
- Allegiance: United Kingdom
- Service years: 1927–1972
- Rank: Captain (RN); Lieutenant Colonel (Army)
- Nickname: "Tiffy"
- Commands: 815 Naval Air Squadron; RNAS Eglinton (HMS Gannet); HMS Delight; RNAS Lossiemouth (HMS Fulmar); HMS Albion; 2nd Battalion, Ulster Defence Regiment
- Conflicts: World War II: Battle of Taranto; Battle of Cape Matapan
- Awards: Distinguished Service Order; Distinguished Service Cross; Air Force Cross
- Other work: Ulster Special Constabulary; Ulster Defence Regiment

Captain Frederick Michael Alexander Torrens-Spence, DSO, DSC, AFC (10 March 1914 – 12 December 2001) was a Royal Navy Fleet Air Arm pilot in the Second World War. Torrens-Spence earned the distinction of holding commissions in the Royal Navy, the Royal Air Force, the British Army and the Royal Ulster Constabulary.

== Early life ==
Known as "Tiffy", Torrens-Spence was born in Whiteabbey, County Antrim, Ireland the son of a professional soldier. Educated at Mourne Grange Public School, Kilkeel, at the age of 13 he attended Dartmouth Royal Naval College.

== Military career ==
After initial service in the fleet Torrens-Spence volunteered for flying duties with the Fleet Air Arm, which at that time was under the command of the Royal Air Force. After flying training, he was commissioned as a pilot in both the RAF and the Navy. His first postings were on the carriers HMS Furious and, in 1937, Glorious.

=== Second World War ===
When war broke out, Torrens-Spence was serving on Glorious which was sent through the Suez Canal to hunt German surface raiders. He was then sent home from Aden to join the new carrier HMS Illustrious. Whilst serving on Illustrious, which had been dispatched to the Mediterranean in September 1940, he took part in the attack on Italian battleships in the Battle of Taranto as a Swordfish torpedo bomber pilot. During the Swordfish attack in Taranto harbour, he torpedoed one of Italy's newest and largest battleships, the Littorio, sinking her in shallow water. He was awarded the Distinguished Service Cross for this action.

He was also involved when Illustrious was badly damaged; Illustrious was escorting a convoy to Malta when she was attacked by three squadrons of German Stuka dive bombers. Suffering multiple bomb hits (including to Torrens-Spence's wardroom) and more than 200 casualties, Illustrious limped to Malta and eventually to America for repairs. Her aircraft were disembarked in Malta, and Torrens-Spence flew to Eleusis, near Athens, Greece, with elements of 815 and 819 Squadrons for an active anti-shipping campaign which later earned him the Distinguished Service Order.

At the Battle of Cape Matapan, Torrens-Spence was ordered to find and attack a large Italian naval force. After observing an attack by aircraft from the carrier HMS Formidable achieve no result, he found a hole in the enemy smokescreen and was confronted with the Pola, which he torpedoed from close range. The cruiser immediately slowed to six knots and the Italian admiral decided to divide his force, leaving a large detachment to escort Pola and sail for home. That night, the Royal Navy engaged with the Italian force off Cape Matapan, and with the aid of radar sank the major part of them. Pola's captain was rescued by the destroyer HMS Jervis and was heard to remark, "Either that pilot was mad or he is the bravest man in the world". Admiral Andrew Cunningham wrote in his dispatch after the battle: "An example of the spirit of these young officers is the case of Lieutenant F.M.A. Torrens-Spence who rather than be left out, flew with the only available aircraft from Eleusis to Maleme ... arranged his own reconnaissance and finally took off with a second aircraft in company and took part in the dawn attack."

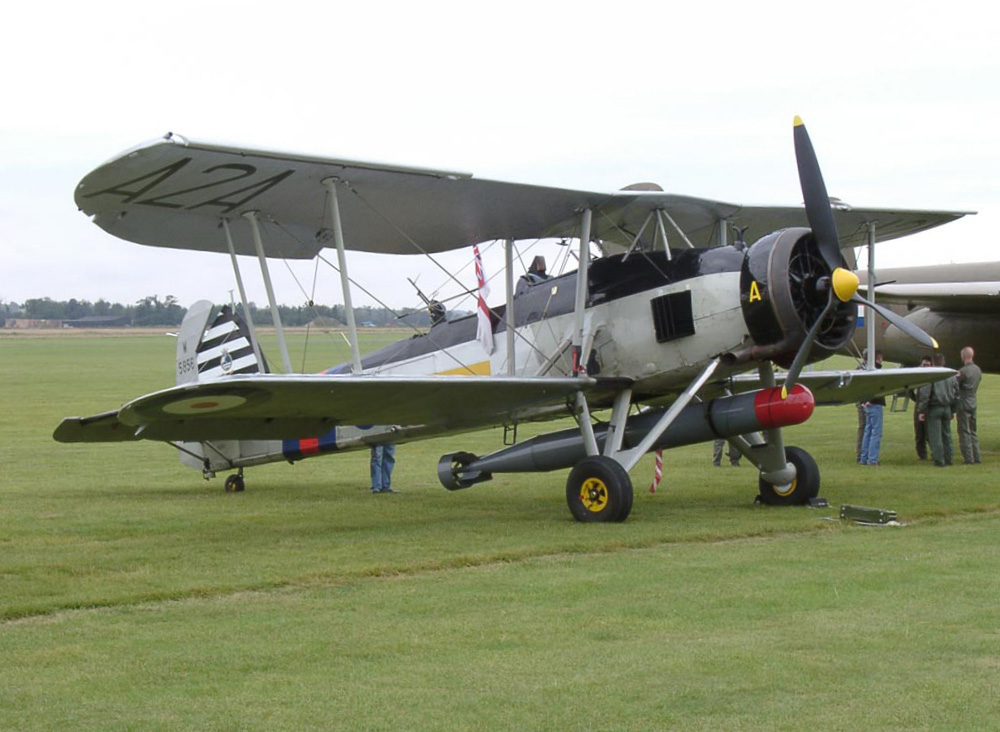
A Fairey Swordfish similar to those used by Torrens-Spence

From March to October 1941, Torrens-Spence commanded 815 Squadron in Albania, where he added to his tally. Unfortunately, this included a hospital ship which the Italians had failed to mark and illuminate. No blame was ever attached to Torrens-Spence, but he was forever saddened by the incident.

From 1942, Torrens-Spence was posted to the UK to become a leading Admiralty test pilot at RAF Boscombe Down where he remained for the next three years, and worked closely with fellow former HMS Glorious and 819 Naval Air Squadron pilot Lieutenant Roy Sydney Baker-Falkner in developing and test flying the Fairey Barracuda aircraft prior to its operational service in the Fleet Air Arm. He was posted back to Illustrious for the closing stages of the war.

=== Post-war ===
He remained in the Navy after the war, becoming chief inspector of the Empire Test Pilots' School. He then served in the carrier HMS Theseus, and as commanding officer of RNAS Eglinton (HMS Gannet) in Northern Ireland.

In 1952, he was promoted captain and sent to the Admiralty to look after future aircraft requirements as deputy director of the Air Warfare Division, naval staff. He wrote the staff requirement for the Buccaneer strike aircraft and steered it through the Admiralty Board.

In 1955, he took command of HMS Delight, a Daring class destroyer deploying in British and Mediterranean waters. Afterwards he commanded a training establishment, RNAS Lossiemouth (HMS Fulmar), before taking command of the aircraft carrier HMS Albion in 1959 where he spent the next two years, most of it in the Far East.

=== Northern Ireland ===
After leaving the Royal Navy Torrens-Spence was appointed as the Commandant of the Ulster Special Constabulary (the "B" Specials) in County Armagh.

When the Specials were disbanded in 1970 and replaced by the Ulster Defence Regiment, Torrens-Spence took control of the County Armagh Battalion (2 UDR), as a lieutenant colonel, to get it up and running. He retired in 1972.

== Later life ==
In 1981, he became Lord Lieutenant of Armagh, after Norman Stronge was killed by the Provisional Irish Republican Army in an armed assault on his home, Tynan Abbey. During this time, he resided at Laurelvale House, Laurelvale – originally the home of industrialist Thomas Sinton. He was also a justice of the peace, served as High Sheriff of Armagh in 1979 and was aide-de-camp to the Queen. He was never overtly involved in politics, but remained throughout his life a committed Unionist, holding senior office in the County Armagh Unionist Association, yet saddened by what he saw as the government's appeasing of terrorism.

He married Rachel Torrens-Spence, with whom he had four children. One of his sons, Brigadier Edward John (Johnny) Torrens-Spence CBE, was British Embassy military attaché to the United States.

== Bibliography ==
- Lamb, Charles, War in a Stringbag. Cassell and Collier Macmillan (1977) ISBN 0-304-29778-X
- Wragg, David, Stringbag: The Fairey Swordfish at War. Leo Cooper Ltd (2004) ISBN 978-1-84415-130-1

Honorary titles
Preceded by Ronald McIlroy Wilson	High Sheriff of Armagh; 1979	Succeeded by John Reginald Miller
Preceded by Sir Norman Stronge	Lord Lieutenant of Armagh; 1981–1989	Succeeded by The Earl of Caledon
