= UDR Four =

Soldiers wrongly imprisoned for murder

The UDR Four were four members of the 2nd Battalion, Ulster Defence Regiment who were convicted of the murder of Adrian Carroll in 1983. Adrian Carroll was the brother of the Sinn Féin councillor Tommy Carroll. Three of the soldiers (Noel Bell, James Hegan and Winston Allen) were acquitted on appeal in 1992. However a fourth, Neil Latimer, had his conviction upheld and served 14 years in prison before being released under the Good Friday Agreement. Latimer, who continues to plead his innocence to the present day, unsuccessfully appealed against his conviction on several occasions.

== Murder of Adrian Carroll ==
On 8 November 1983, at around 4:30pm, 24-year-old Catholic civilian Adrian Carroll was shot several times with a pistol in an alleyway a few yards from his house on Abbey Street in Armagh City. Despite being rushed to Craigavon Hospital, Carroll was pronounced dead at 7:20pm, with the cause of death recorded as being due to a gunshot wound to the head. Although Carroll was not a paramilitary himself, he was the brother of Rodney Carroll, who was an Irish National Liberation Army member killed by undercover Royal Ulster Constabulary officers the previous year. In a later coded message to Downtown Radio, Carrol's murder was claimed by the Protestant Action Force, which was a cover name used mostly by rogue members of the Ulster Volunteer Force (UVF) who carried out attacks on their own initiative without the approval of the organization's senior leadership.

== Initial investigations ==
In the course of their investigations, the RUC took statements from 17-year-old Elaine Faulkner, who found Carroll's dead body immediately after the shooting and promptly ran to contact the authorities. Faulkner told the investigating officers how she had seen a man walking up Abbey Street and turning into the alleyway, after which she heard gunshots. She described the man as being in his early 20s with gold rimmed glasses, around 5 feet tall and wearing a tartan patterned flatcap. In an effort to entice other eyewitnesses to come forward, the RUC released the physical description of the suspected murderer to the news media.

In late November 1983, having heard the media reports about Carroll's murder, a witness subsequently referred to as "Mrs A" came forward to inform the police that she had seen someone matching the description of the suspect in the immediate vicinity of the shooting on the day in question. Mrs A made a statement that at around 4:25pm she was driving on Lonsdale Street when she noticed two British Army Land Rovers parked on the right hand side of the road outside Armagh Technical College, and fearing there was a bomb scare she slowed to a stop. Looking to he right then saw two men in UDR uniforms running towards the parked vehicles, with a man in civilian clothes running in between them also, and Mrs A at first thought they were arresting him. The man was wearing a tartan cap and had small gold-rimmed eyeglasses, and as they drew closer, she recognized him as Neil Latimer, who had been a former colleague of hers at a factory for over a year. Mrs A knew it was Latimer, as she spoke to him on a daily basis in their previous place of work and she had been stopped by him while he was manning a UDR security checkpoint a couple of weeks previously. The three men then jumped into the back of one of the Land Rovers, at which point they all drove off in convoy.

== Arrest of suspects ==
On the early morning of 29 November 1983, the RUC arrested 21-year-old UDR member Neil Latimer and transported him to Castlereagh Police Station for interrogation. Latimer was interviewed a total of 29 times over 7 days, and after first denying involvement he then allegedly made a written statement describing how he had snuck off from his UDR foot patrol to change into civilian clothes before shooting Carroll twice and then returning to his own home, asserting that the other soldiers on his patrol were completely unaware of his actions on that day. However, according to the interview notes Latimer subsequently withdrew his confession and told RUC interrogators that it was in fact his brother David who committed the murder, and that he was present on Lonsdale Street when David climbed into the Land Rover. Finally, after purportedly being informed that a witness had made a statement specifically identifying him as the person seen climbing into the Land Rover dressed in civilian clothes on Lonsdale Street, a statement attributed to Latimer containing a detailed account of his involvement in Carroll's murder was then produced.

The statement, which was subsequently signed on every page by Latimer, described how on the day before the murder fellow UDR soldier Jim Hagan revealed to Latimer that they were going to shoot Adrian Carroll, and that Latimer would pull the trigger. Hagan is alleged to have instructed Latimer to bring a change of civilian clothes into the barracks the next day when he reported for duty, and on that day Latimer and Hagan went out on vehicle patrol with UDR members Noel Bell and Winston Allen, who were also involved in the conspiracy. Latimer thereafter changed into his civilian clothes behind some portacabins on Lonsdale Street, after which Colin Worton and Bell escorted him into a Land Rover driven by Hagan. He was then handed a pistol by Hagan and dropped off on McCrums Court, after which he spotted Carroll and started following him. Latimer then shot him twice and ran to College Hill to a pre-arranged rendezvous with the Land Rover driven by Hagan, where he changed back into his UDR uniform and returned to the police station. UDR members 19-year-old Noel Bell, 33-year-old James Hagan, 22-year-old Colin Worton and 23-year-old Winston Allen were also arrested and interviewed by the RUC around the same time, and they subsequently made written statements purportedly confessing to their involvement in the murder of Carroll.

== Legal proceedings ==
On 30 May 1986, trial judge Kelly ruled that Colin Worton's written statement, which was the only evidence against him, was inadmissible and acquitted him of all charges. However, on 1 July 1986, after a trial before a non-jury diplock court, defendants Neil Latimer, Noel Bell, James Hagan and Winston Allen were found guilty of the murder of Adrian Carroll and sentenced to life in prison. All four challenged their convictions, claiming that they were threatened and induced into confessing to the murder while under interrogation, however on 4 May 1988 the Appeals Court rejected their applications and affirmed their earlier convictions. In 1991, the Secretary of State for Northern Ireland referred the men's case back to the Court of Appeal after ESDA testing proved that some of the RUC interview notes relating to the men had been altered and rewritten, while some of the authentication markings by senior officers were also deemed to be fraudulent. On 28 July 1992, the convictions of Noel Bell, James Hagan and Winston Allen were deemed to be unsafe and were therefore quashed, however the appeal of Neil Latimer was dismissed after the court ruled that the testimony of Mrs A corroborated his statement and thus proved his guilt beyond reasonable doubt. Latimer was eventually released from prison on license in 1998.

== Political Efforts to help Latimer ==
Latimer's case has been highlighted several times in the Parliament of the United Kingdom. On 21 October 1992 Peter Robinson moved an Early Day Motion in the House of Commons of the United Kingdom (which received wide cross party support) that said:

That this House urges the Secretary of State for Northern Ireland to consider a further referral to the Court of Appeal of the case of Neil Latimer; acknowledges that the recent judgement in the UDR 4 case relied heavily upon the evidence of witness A in refusing Neil Latimer's release; is now deeply concerned about the safety of that judgement in light of an affidavit signed by a Roman Catholic priest, Pat Buckley, alleging he met the women known as witness A who informed him she was not certain that Neil Latimer was the man she saw in Lonsdale Street in November 1983 and that she believed Neil Latimer is an innocent man; and seeks an investigation into claims, in the same affidavit, that witness A, her family and friends have received favours from the police in exchange for witness A not retracting her statement.

On 23 February 1994, Ken Maginnis implored the British government to refer Latimer's case back to the Court of Appeal during a parliamentary Adjournment debate, saying:

In this case, confessions were extracted in unreasonable circumstances, as was shown when Private Warton was found not guilty and discharged during the original trial. Notes and confessions were tampered with, as was shown when Allen, Bell and Hegan won their appeals. There has never been one iota of forensic evidence produced to link any of the UDR Four with the murder, and there is now serious doubt about the reliability of Witness A's evidence.

== Neil Latimer further appeals ==
Following a Criminal Cases Review Commission inquiry and a public campaign to clear his name, Latimer's case was referred back to the Appeal Court of Northern Ireland for a record third time. However, on 9 February 2004, the High Court in Belfast rejected Latimer's latest appeal against his conviction, ruling that the court was satisfied his original confessions were an accurate account of his involvement in the murder of Adrian Carroll in 1983. In early September 2025, Latimer made a public appeal for help to raise £10,000 for a fourth appeal against his conviction, with the Belfast Telegraph newspaper naming alleged former Mount Vernon UVF member James "Jimmy Shades" Smyth as an alternative prime suspect for the murder of Adrian Carroll.

Latimer had previously highlighted how Smyth was around 5 foot 4 inches in height (Latimer is 5 foot 10 inches tall) and wore thick eyeglasses his entire life, thus he matched the physical description Elaine Faulkner gave to the RUC of the suspected killer, adding that loyalist sources had identified Smyth to him as the actual gunman several times over the years. The Belfast Telegraph also claimed the UVF believed that all of the UDR Four would have their convictions eventually quashed on appeal, however when Latimer's appeal failed they made a conscious decision to protect Smyth from prosecution.
