= 3rd Infantry Brigade (United Kingdom) =

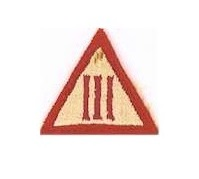
- Badge of the 3rd Infantry Brigade.
- Active: 1809–1981; 1988–2004
- Country: United Kingdom
- Branch: British Army
- Type: Infantry
- Size: Brigade
- Part of: HQ Northern Ireland
- Garrison/HQ: Drumadd Barracks, Armagh
- Engagements: Peninsular War; Second Anglo-Afghan War; First World War; Second World War

The 3rd Infantry Brigade was a Regular Army infantry brigade of the British Army, part of the 1st Infantry Division. Originally formed in 1809 during the Peninsular War, the brigade had a long history, seeing action in the Second Anglo-Afghan War, and during both the First and the Second World Wars.

== Formation ==
The 1st Division was formed during the Peninsular War in Spain and Portugal, part of the army commanded by General Arthur Wellesley (later 1st Duke of Wellington). In 1814, the 3rd brigade took part in the Battle of New Orleans, commanded by Lt. Gen. John Keane. It also took part in the Battle of Ali Masjid in November 1878, during the Second Anglo-Afghan War.

As the Second Boer War ended in 1902, the army was restructured and a 2nd Infantry division was established permanently as part of the 1st Army Corps, comprising the 3rd and 4th Infantry Brigades.

== First World War ==
The brigade saw service during the First World War as part of the British Expeditionary Force on the Western Front.

=== Order of battle ===
The 3rd Brigade was constituted as follows during the war:

- 1st Battalion, Queen's Royal Regiment (West Surrey) (left November 1914)
- 1st Battalion, South Wales Borderers
- 1st Battalion, Gloucestershire Regiment
- 2nd Battalion, Welch Regiment
- 2nd Battalion, Royal Munster Fusiliers (from November 1914 until February 1918)
- 1/4th (Denbighshire) Battalion, Royal Welch Fusiliers (from November 1914 until September 1915)
- 1/6th (Glamorgan) Battalion, Welsh Regiment (from October 1915 until it became the divisional pioneer battalion in May 1916)
- 1/9th Battalion, King's Regiment (Liverpool) (November 1915 to January 1916)
- 3rd Trench Mortar Battery (formed 27 November 1915)
- 3rd Machine Gun Company, Machine Gun Corps (formed 26 January 1916, moved to 1st Battalion, Machine Gun Corps 28 February 1918)

=== Commanders ===
The following officers commanded 3rd Brigade during the First World War:

- Brigadier-General H. J. S. Landon (At mobilization)
- Colonel A. C. Lovett (1 November 1914 – acting)
- Brigadier-General R. H. K. Butler (22 November 1914)
- Brigadier-General H. R. Davies (21 February 1915)
- Brigadier-General G. S. G. Craufurd (19 November 1916)
- Brigadier-General R. C. A. McCalmont (3 March 1917)
- Brigadier-General R. B. Barker (18 November 1917)
- Brigadier-General H. H. S. Morant (23 January 1918)
- Brigadier General Sir W. A. I. Kay, Bt. (23 May 1918)
- Brigadier-General J. V. Campbell (4 October 1918 – temporary)
- Brigadier-General E. St. G. Aubyn (6 October 1918)

== Between the wars ==
Between the wars, the brigade, now redesignated 3rd Infantry Brigade, saw numerous changes in its battalions, including 2nd Bedfordshire and Hertfordshire Regiment, 1st Royal Scots Fusiliers, 1st King's Own Scottish Borderers and 1st Border Regiment. However, these were all posted away by 1937, either to other divisions stationed in the United Kingdom or to different parts of the British Empire. From 1936 to 1938, the brigade was commanded by Arthur Floyer-Acland.

In 1938, they were replaced by 2nd Buffs (Royal East Kent Regiment), 2nd Cameronians (Scottish Rifles) and 1st Royal Irish Fusiliers. There was no fourth battalion, as it was in this year that British infantry divisions were reduced from twelve to nine battalions, infantry brigades reducing from four to three. These battalions, too, were replaced in early 1939: by 2nd Sherwood Foresters, recently returned from many years spent in British India and Guernsey; 1st Duke of Wellington's Regiment, returned to England from three years spent Malta; and 1st King's Shropshire Light Infantry, which had returned to England in 1938 for the first time after having served in British India in 16 years.

== Second World War ==
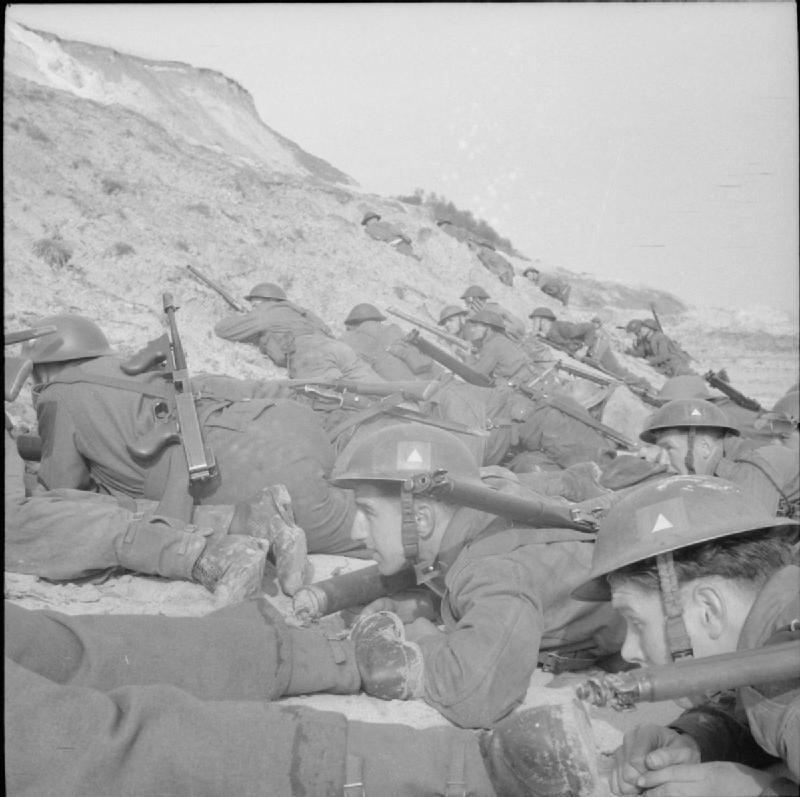
After disembarking from landing craft, troops of the 1st Battalion, Duke of Wellington's Regiment take cover on the beach at Cromer in Norfolk, 21 April 1942. Live machine-gun and mortar fire was used during this exercise.

During the Second World War, the brigade continued to be part of the 1st Infantry Division and would remain with it throughout the war. It was sent to France on 25 September 1939, shortly after the outbreak of the war, and served as part of the British Expeditionary Force (BEF) in France. The brigade was to remain in France, serving alongside the French Army on the Maginot Line on the Franco-Belgian border. In May 1940, the German Army invaded Holland, Belgium and France, and during the fighting, the BEF was forced to retreat to Dunkirk. There, the 3rd Brigade was evacuated to England, arriving on 1 June 1940.

After the retreat from Dunkirk, it remained in the United Kingdom on home defence against a German invasion until early 1943, when it was sent to North Africa to take part in the Campaign in Tunisia. On 11 June 1943, the 1st Infantry Division was sent to the Italian island of Pantelleria (Operation Corkscrew), which they captured and occupied without casualties.

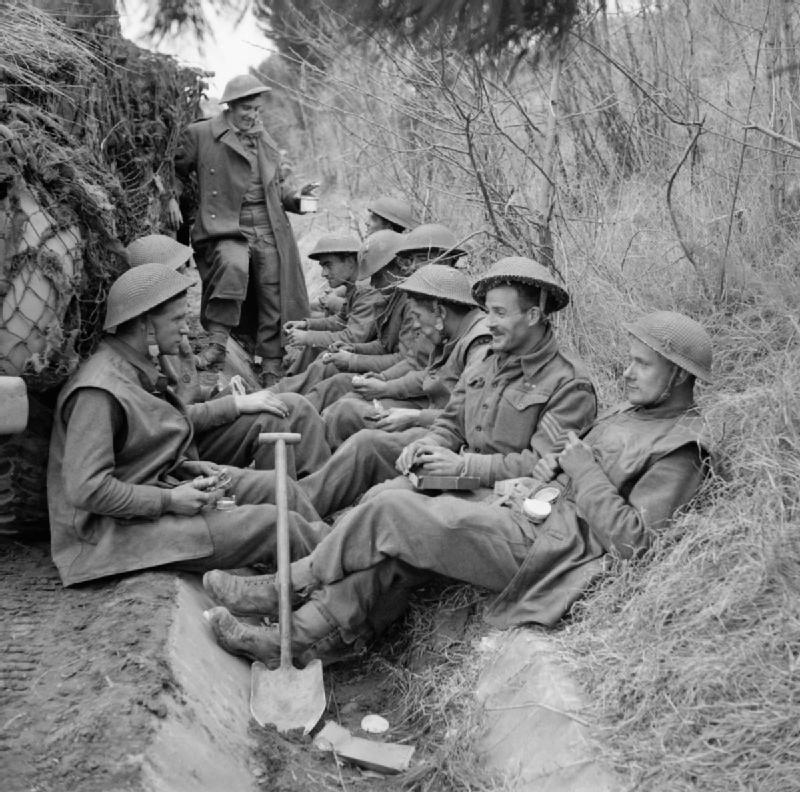
Men of the 1st Battalion, King's Shropshire Light Infantry eat a meal before going into action at Anzio, Italy, 31 January 1944.

In late 1943, the brigade, along with the rest of the division, was sent to Italy to join the British Eighth Army fighting in Italy. However, they were soon transferred to command of the U.S. Fifth Army for the Anzio landings (Operation Shingle). They landed at Anzio on 22 January 1944, where they would fight in some of the worst and most violent battles of the Italian campaign.

During a German counterattack on 3 February, the brigade was almost completely surrounded and was only saved by a counterattack from the 1st Battalion, London Scottish of 168th (London) Brigade (temporarily detached from its parent unit, the 56th (London) Infantry Division, to come under 1st Division command). The brigade continued to fight in numerous battles around Anzio, and even when not, were still subjected to almost constant artillery, mortar or small arms fire. The brigade fought in the breakout from the Anzio beachhead and Operation Diadem.

In October 1944, while the 3rd Brigade was fighting on the Gothic Line with the Eighth Army, Private Richard Henry Burton of the 1st Battalion, Duke of Wellington's Regiment was awarded the Victoria Cross. In the same battle, Captain Arthur Burns was awarded the Distinguished Service Order. The brigade fought in Italy until 28 January 1945, when they were sent to Palestine as a garrison, where they remained to the end of the war.

=== Order of battle ===
The 3rd Infantry Brigade was constituted as follows during the war:

- 1st Battalion, Duke of Wellington's Regiment
- 1st Battalion, King's Shropshire Light Infantry
- 2nd Battalion, Sherwood Foresters
- 3rd Infantry Brigade Anti-Tank Company (formed 3 September 1939, disbanded 31 December 1940)

=== Commanders ===
The following officers commanded 3rd Infantry Brigade during the war:

- Brigadier H.O. Curtis (until 18 December 1939)
- Lieutenant Colonel J.M.L. Grover (Acting, from 18 to 28 December 1939)
- Brigadier T.N.F. Wilson (from 28 December 1939 until 19 December 1940)
- Brigadier W.R.C. Penney (from 19 December 1940 until 26 September 1941)
- Lieutenant Colonel R. Bryans (Acting, from 26 September until 20 October 1941)
- Brigadier H.A.E. Matthews (from 20 October 1941 until 24 April 1943)
- Brigadier R.H. Maxwell (temporary, from 24 to 30 April 1943)
- Brigadier J.G. James (from 30 April 1943 until 27 April 1944)
- Brigadier E.E. Dorman-Smith (from 27 April until 14 August 1944)
- Lieutenant Colonel B.W. Webb-Carter (Acting, from 14 to 26 August 1944)
- Brigadier P. St Clair-Ford (from 26 August 1944 until 26 April 1945, again from 16 May 1945)
- Lieutenant Colonel W.H. Hulton-Harrop (Acting, from 26 April to 16 May 1945)

== Post-war ==
As part of 1st Division, the 3rd Brigade was in Egypt after the war until returning to Chiseldon, Wiltshire. During the Suez Crisis, the brigade was moved to Malta in August 1956. From there, they went to Egypt on the aircraft carrier HMS Theseus, reaching Port Said just as the ceasefire was declared. It then went on to Cyprus in 1956. Following operations against EOKA, the brigade was disbanded there in 1963.

From 1972, the 3rd Infantry Brigade was headquartered in the Kitchen Hill Factory in Lurgan, until it moved to the Mahon Road Barracks in Portadown in late 1976, under HQ Northern Ireland. It was the HQ element for the security forces which controlled the South Armagh region of Ulster, including several battalions of the Ulster Defence Regiment. In September 1981, the brigade was disbanded and its units divided between 8 Brigade and 39 Brigade. The brigade re-formed on 1 July 1988, in the Drumadd Barracks in Armagh. The brigade was disbanded once more on 1 September 2004 and its former units again divided between 8 Brigade and 39 Brigade.

In 1989, the 3rd Infantry Brigade had the following structure:

- HQ 3rd Infantry Brigade and 203rd Signal Squadron, Royal Signals, Armagh
- 1st Bn, Worcestershire and Sherwood Foresters Regiment, Omagh
- 2nd Bn, Ulster Defence Regiment (V)
- 11th Bn, Ulster Defence Regiment (V)

== Sources ==
- Becke, Archibald F. (1935). Order of Battle of Divisions Part 1–The Regular British Divisions. London: HMSO. OCLC 4405016.
- "HQ Northern Ireland (HQNI)". Archived from the original on 13 October 2007.
- Tanner, James (2014). The British Army since 2000. Osprey Publishing. ISBN 978-1782005933.
- Joslen, Lt-Col H.F. (2003) [1st pub. HMSO:1960]. Orders of Battle: Second World War, 1939–1945. Uckfield: Naval and Military Press. ISBN 978-1-84342-474-1.
- Blaxland, Gregory (1979). Alexander's Generals (the Italian Campaign 1944–1945). London: William Kimber. ISBN 0-7183-0386-5.
