= Thomas Sinton =

Thomas Sinton, JP (February 1826 – 20 August 1887) was an Irish industrialist and magistrate. Sinton made a significant impact upon the Irish linen trade; not least establishing the village of Laurelvale, County Armagh.

Thomas Sinton was born in Tamnaghmore House, Tandragee, County Armagh, the son of David Sinton and Sarah Green; his brother was John Sinton. The Sintons, like so many of Northern Ireland's linen families, were Quakers, in this case of Scottish descent; although the Sintons had been settled at Tamnaghmore for several hundred years. Sinton's father, David Sinton (1792-1860), was the first cousin of American multimillionaire David Sinton. Thomas Sinton was sent to board at Friends' School, Lisburn – a Quaker school. In 1859 he married Elizabeth Bridget Hesilridge Buckby (1835–1900), her family lived at Prospect House, Tandragee. He had eight children by his wife;

- (William) Maynard Sinton, JP (High Sheriff of Armagh and Unionist County Councillor for County Armagh – lived at Ballyards Castle)
- David Arthur Sinton, of Stramore House, Gilford (1862-1919, d.s.p.)
- Dorothy Hesilridge Sinton (1863-1949, d.s.p.)
- Elizabeth Sinton (1865-1865)
- Thomas Greville Sinton, JP; lived at Laurelvale House, served as High Sheriff of Armagh (1930) and as a magistrate (1866-1940, d.s.p.)
- Alfred Henry Hesilridge Sinton, of Hill House, Laurelvale (1868-1932, d.s.p.)
- Frederick Buckby Sinton, of Banford House, Tullylish, Gilford (1870-1943)
- Jemima Sarah Isabella Sinton (1872-1952, m. Isaac van Abbe, a Dutchman)

Sinton died at his home, Laurelvale House (later the home of Michael Torrens-Spence), and was buried at Moyallon Friends' Burial Ground, Gilford. His effects were valued, in 1887, at over £100,000. Sinton, through his brother John Sinton, was a great-uncle of the soldier and doctor John Alexander Sinton.

== Linen factory ==
Thomas Sinton's mill, Laurelvale

Sinton built the model village of Laurelvale (named due to the abundance of laurel bushes in the area), also known as Laurel Vale, to house workers at his large linen factory – Thomas Sinton & Co. The factory was started in the early 1850s and by the 1880s it employed around 700 workers, responsible for manufacturing very high-grade heavy linen. The company was responsible for almost all of the houses built in the village, especially those for family members and factory managers.

He also owned factories in Tandragee (Sintons' Mill), by the River Cusher, and at Killyleagh, County Down. His younger brother, John Sinton, owned a linen mill at Ravernet near Hillsborough, County Down, and Thomas's descendants would also acquire the Banford Bleachworks, at Tullylish.

The Laurelvale factory closed in 1944 when it was acquired by the Ministry of Defence and used by the Hoffman company for the manufacture of ball bearings for tank turrets etc. In the 1970s it was damaged in a fire but was inhabited by a private family until the mid eighties. Both the house and the factory area have recently been cleared and replaced by a housing development. All that remains of Laurelvale House and the factory now is an old wall, which was part of the stable block.

Sintons' Mill, Tandragee, was still in production, employing 200 people, until 1996. There were then plans afoot to convert the mill, which remained the Sinton family's property, into a tourist and retail facility, with the hope of a £7–8 million investment. Planning permission was granted for this, however, the building was put up for sale by Thomas (Tim) Sinton (the subject's great-grandson) in 2003.
