= Mahon Road Barracks =

- Portadown, Northern Ireland
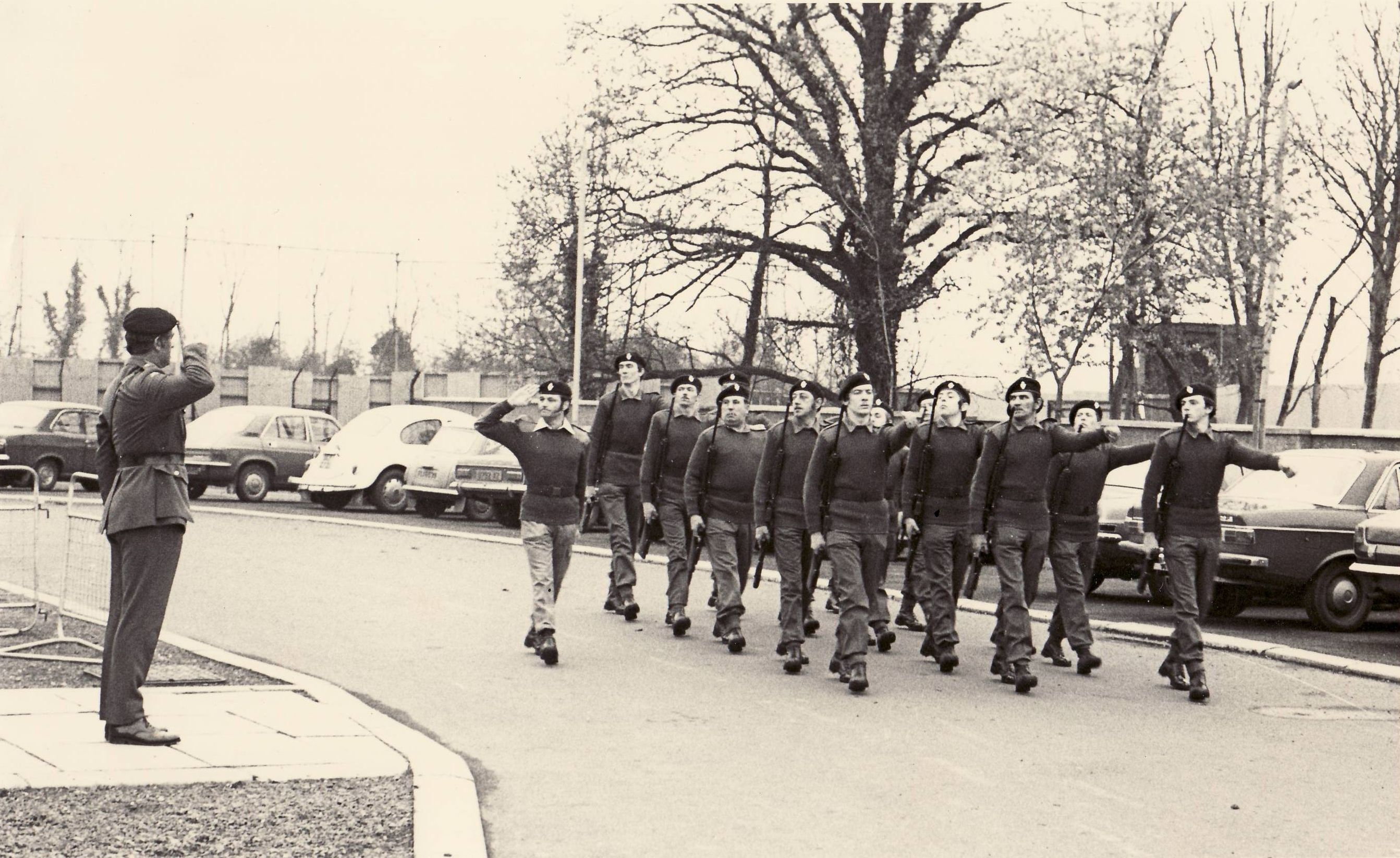
- March past at Mahon Road Barracks

Site information
- Type: Barracks
- Owner: Ministry of Defence
- Operator: British Army

Location
- Location within Northern Ireland
- Coordinates: 54.40603°N 6.45441°W

Site history
- Built: 1972
- In use: 1972-2007

Garrison information
- Occupants: 11th Battalion, Ulster Defence Regiment

The Mahon Road Barracks was a military installation in Portadown, Northern Ireland.

== History ==
The barracks were built on the Mahon Road in Portadown in 1972 to accommodate the 11th Battalion, Ulster Defence Regiment and were originally dubbed "Fort Mahon". In February 1974 the barracks also became the Headquarters for 3rd Infantry Brigade where the brigade's units included, along with Brigade Staff, 174 (Provost) Company, Royal Military Police.

The barracks were also the home of G Squadron, 22nd SAS Regiment and were the centre of many of their operations in Northern Ireland including the interception of eight members of a Provisional Irish Republican Army team at Loughgall RUC Barracks in 1987; G Squadron operated under the working name of 4 Field Survey Troop, Royal Engineers.

3rd brigade was moved to Drumadd Barracks in Armagh in 1988 during a restructuring of land forces in Northern Ireland. In July 2000 the barracks were used by the security forces during the Drumcree conflict.

The barracks were closed in January 2007. The adjacent site to the South has since been marketed as a private housing development under the name "Maghon Park".

== Sources ==
- Dillon, Martin (1991). The Dirty War. Arrow. ISBN 978-0099845201.
- Potter, John (2001). Testimony to Courage: The History of the Ulster Defence Regiment 1969-1992. Pen & Sword Books. ISBN 978-0850528190.
