= Drumadd Barracks =

British Army installation in Armagh, Northern Ireland

- Armagh, Northern Ireland

Site information
- Type: Barracks
- Owner: Ministry of Defence
- Operator: British Army

Location
- Location within Northern Ireland
- Coordinates: 54.349°N 6.634°W

Site history
- Built: 1975
- In use: 1975-2007

Garrison information
- Occupants: 3rd Infantry Brigade

Drumadd Barracks is a former military installation in Armagh, Northern Ireland.

== History ==
The barracks were established on Hamiltonsbawn Road in Armagh in 1975. They became a base for 2nd Battalion, Ulster Defence Regiment in 1976, during the Troubles, and then became headquarters for 3rd Infantry Brigade, who moved from the Mahon Road Barracks in Portadown, in February 1988. The barracks were also the southern area regional command headquarters.

In 1999, journalist Duncan Campbell alleged that the barracks housed a GCHQ facility. The facility was believed to intercept phone calls by eavesdropping on a microwave link between the Republic of Ireland and Northern Ireland.

In November 1996 a 2,500 lb bomb planted by the Provisional Irish Republican Army was found abandoned about half a mile from the barracks.

In 2003 an ornate memorial window was unveiled at the barracks by Archbishop Robin Eames. The barracks were vacated in July 2007 and sold for redevelopment in September 2014.

== Sources ==
- Potter, John (2001). Testimony to Courage: The History of the Ulster Defence Regiment 1969-1992. Pen & Sword Books. ISBN 978-0850528190.
