= Ravernet =

Village in County Down, Northern Ireland

Coordinates: 54°28′N 6°03′W

Ravernet, also known as Ravarnet or Ravernette (from Irish Ráth Bhearnait, meaning 'ringfort of the gap') is a village and townland in County Down, Northern Ireland. It is located on the Ravarnet River, about 3 km south of Lisburn and about 3 km northeast of Hillsborough. Nearby is Sprucefield and the M1 motorway. In the 2021 Census it had a population of 563.

== 2021 Census ==
Ravernet is classified as a small village or hamlet by the Northern Ireland Statistics and Research Agency (NISRA) (i.e. with population between 51 and 999 people).The 2021 Census placed the population of the town at 563 across 226 households. The village's area was measured as 0.17 km^{2} giving it a population density of 3,327.34 per km^{2}.

At the time of the 2021 Census, of the people living in Ravernet:

- 143 (25.4%) were aged under 20 years and 99 (17.6%) were aged 60 and over
- 50.98% of the population were recorded as male and 49.02% female
- 68 (12.1%) were from a Catholic background, a 300% increase from the 2001 Census, 439 (78.0%) were from a "Protestant or Other Christian" background, and 3 (0.5%) were from other religions.
