= Cusher River =

River in Northern Ireland

Coordinates: 54°23′N 6°24′W

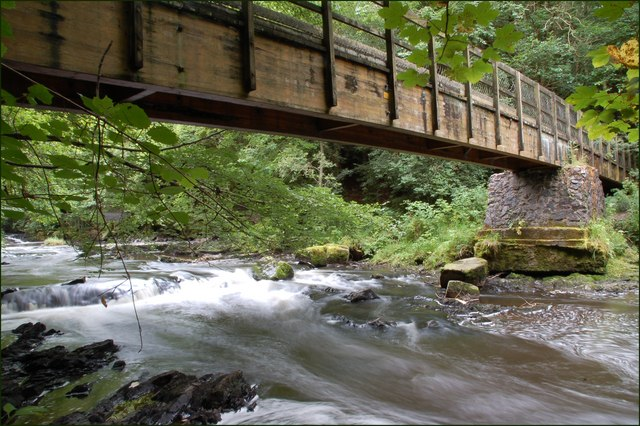
Cusher River in Clare Glen near Tandragee

Cusher River is a river in County Armagh, Northern Ireland. It is formed by the junction, near Mountnorris, of two small streams (the Creggan and the Blackwater), flows by Tandragee, and joins the River Bann one mile above Portadown.

The Cusher River is part of the Newry Canal. Both of these waters and the Bann connect at Whitecoat.

== History ==
During the 19th century, the Cusher River had various mills for food.

== Pollution ==
In June 2008, river pollution killed many roach and trout.

== See also ==
- Rivers of Ireland
- List of rivers of Ireland
