= Tandragee =

Town in County Armagh, Northern Ireland

Coordinates: 54.356°N 6.415°W

Tandragee: Irish: Tóin re Gaoith
- Town
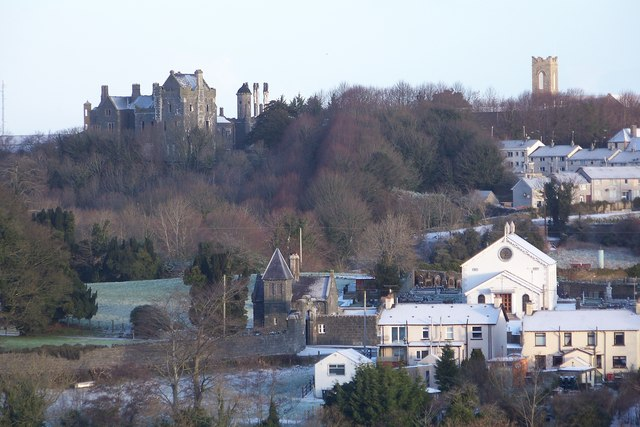
- Tandragee Castle overlooks the town

- Location within Northern Ireland
- Population: 3,545 (2021 census)
- Irish grid reference: J030462
  - Belfast: 25 mi (40 km)
- District: Armagh, Banbridge and Craigavon
- County: County Armagh
- Country: Northern Ireland
- Sovereign state: United Kingdom
- Post town: CRAIGAVON
- Postcode district: BT62
- Dialling code: 028
- Police: Northern Ireland
- Fire: Northern Ireland
- Ambulance: Northern Ireland
- UK Parliament: Newry & Armagh
- NI Assembly: Newry & Armagh

Tandragee (from Irish Tóin re Gaoith, meaning 'backside to the wind') is a small historic market town in County Armagh, Northern Ireland. It is on a hillside above the Cusher River, and is overlooked by Tandragee Castle. The town is in the civil parish of Ballymore and the historic barony of Orior Lower. Earlier spellings of the name include 'Tanderagee' and 'Tonregee'. It had a population of 3,545 people in the 2021 census.

== History ==
Overlooking the town is Tandragee Castle. It was originally the seat of the chief of the O'Hanlon clan, who was Lord of Orior. Because some of the O'Hanlons took part in the Nine Years' War, the castle and surrounding territory were confiscated from the O'Hanlons and granted to Oliver St John and his heirs.

Tandragee Castle was rebuilt in about 1837, after having previously been destroyed during the Irish Rebellion of 1641, for George Montagu, 6th Duke of Manchester. Its grounds have been home to the Tayto potato-crisp factory since 1956, after being bought by businessman Thomas Hutchinson.

=== Irish Rebellion of 1641 ===
On 23 October 1641, the fortified town of Tandragee was attacked and taken by Irish rebels led by Patrick and Edmond O'Hanlon, as a part of the O'Hanlon clan's efforts to reclaim their territory. The rebels set fire to the church of Ballymore, as well as Captain Oliver St John's castle (Tandragee Castle), resulting in the destruction of the town. They also reportedly executed Protestant settlers living in Tandragee.

In April 1642, Felim O'Neill, leading the rebellion, commanded that his forces gather at Tandragee to prepare to confront the Scots Covenanters who had landed in Ulster. About 2,000 soldiers responded to O'Neill's call.

On 12 May 1643, General Robert Monro led an army of 4,000 Covenanters to Tandragee, and burned homes in the surrounding region. Felim O'Neill's forces, comprising both cavalry and infantry, engaged Monro's men. During this skirmish, the lieutenant of Colonel Monro's cavalry, along with two captains and several soldiers, lost their lives. Ultimately, the O'Hanlons lost their hold of Tandragee, with the castle left in a state of disrepair as a result of the conflict.

On 9 September 1679 a group of Redmond O'Hanlon's followers murdered Henry St John, grandnephew of Sir Oliver St John, when horse-riding near Knockbridge. He was the owner of Tandragee Castle and its demesne at the time.

=== Tandragee Volunteers ===
In the late 18th century, Britain was engaged in the American Revolutionary War. This heightened the risk of invasion by French and Spanish forces, especially in Ireland. In response, groups of Irish Volunteers were formed throughout Ireland. They were equipped and managed independently and mostly consisted of Protestants, mainly from the Church of Ireland. Several companies were set up in the Tandragee area.

The Tandragee Volunteers, organised by Captain Nicholas Johnston in 1779, were fitted with scarlet uniforms faced with white details. Johnston set up another company in Tandragee known as the Tandragee Invincibles. In the churchyard, there is a grave dedicated to one of its volunteers, John Whitten, who died in 1785.

Other companies included the Tandragee Light Dragoons, led by James Craig. Volunteer activities were mostly ceremonial, featuring reviews and shooting competitions. The Tandragee Volunteers played a notable role in a skirmish at Lisnagade in 1791. A group of Catholic Defenders set up camp at Lisnagade fort, planning to confront a group of Protestant Peep O' Day Boys commemorating King William's triumph at the Battle of the Boyne. This skirmish inspired the creation of a ballad known as Lisnagade ("Ye Protestants of Ulster").

The Volunteers' influence waned after the American Revolutionary War as new government-sanctioned groups emerged, such as the Yeomanry. Following the Battle of the Diamond, the Yeomanry became associated with the Orange Order. Established in 1796, the Tandragee Yeomanry, along with the County Armagh Yeomanry, played a key role in suppressing the 1798 United Irishmen Rebellion. The Newry Telegraph estimated that 40,000 met at a demonstration in Tandragee. With the Irish Volunteers disbanded and the United Irishmen defeated, the Acts of Union 1800 dissolved the all-Ireland Parliament.

==== Home Rule crisis ====
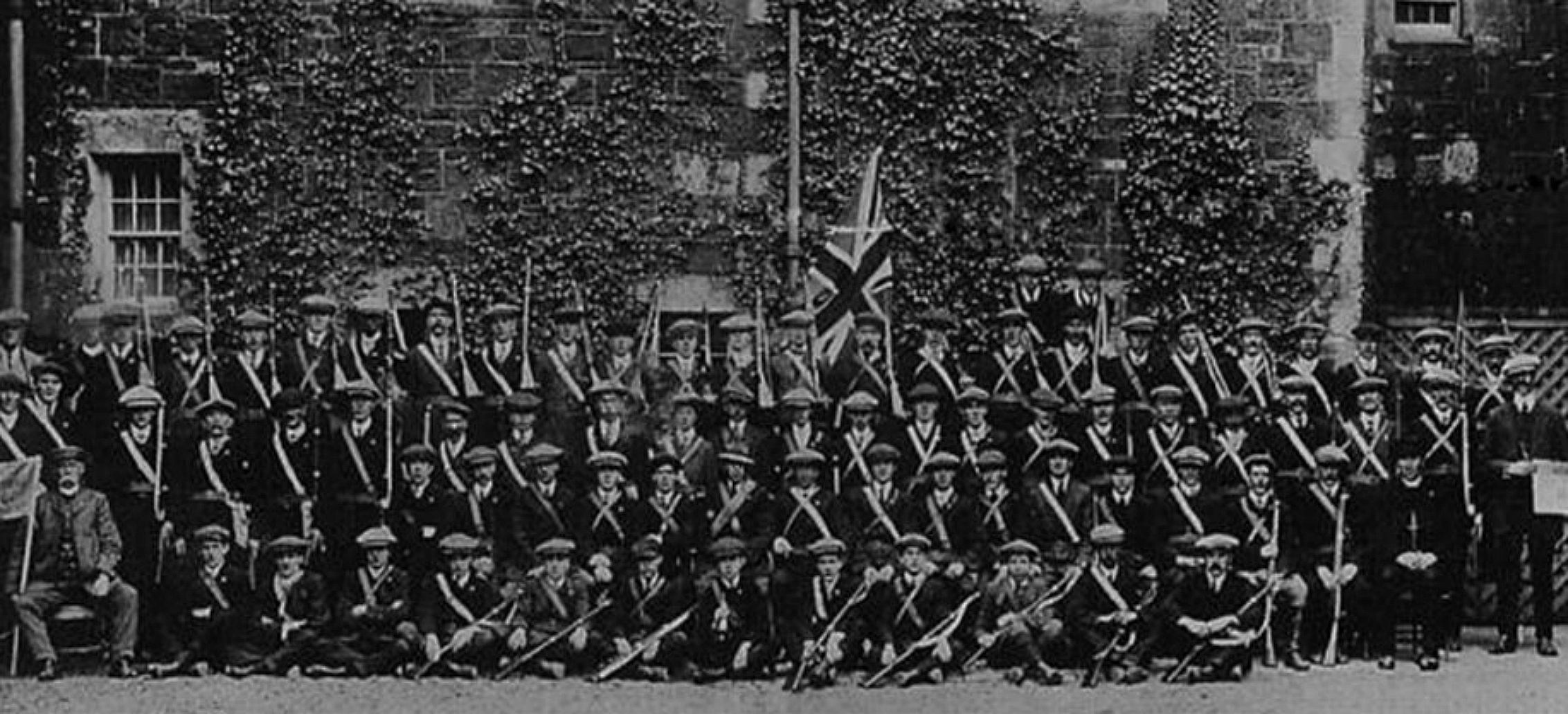
The Tandragee Volunteers at Tandragee Castle

From the introduction of the First Home Rule Bill in 1886, the Protestant community in Tandragee strongly opposed the idea and played a role in the establishment of a proposed 'Orange Army'. An effigy of Prime Minister William Gladstone was set alight in the town following an anti-Home Rule demonstration.

Tandragee also had a strong representation in the Ulster Defence Union. In the central assembly of 600 members appointed on 21 October 1886, the southern region, including Armagh, Cavan, and Monaghan, was represented by eight local representatives: Rev. P.A. Kelly, Rev. W. McEndoo, Rev. R.J. Whan, Maynard Sinton, Thomas White, William O’Brien, John Atkinson, and Rev. George Laverty.

In 1910, branches of the Unionist Club were founded in Tandragee, Clare, Scarva, Poyntzpass, and Ballyshiel. In September, under the supervision of William Montagu, 9th Duke of Manchester, members of the Tandragee Club engaged in drills prior to the Ulster Covenant.

During the Third Home Rule Crisis, the Ulster Unionist Party leadership chose to unite the various unionist paramilitary groups. By December 1912, the County Armagh Committee included several figures from the business sector, the legal field, and the local aristocracy. The representatives from Tandragee were Rev. R.J. Whan and George Davison. These people played a role in the eventual formation of a local battalion of the Ulster Volunteers.

Tandragee was identified by the Royal Irish Constabulary in 1912 as one of ten locations where unionist paramilitary drills were occurring. The population of the Tandragee area became a majority of the Third Battalion of the County Armagh Regiment of the Ulster Volunteer Force - also known as the Tandragee Volunteers. Tandragee Castle was the headquarters of the Tandragee Volunteers, with records indicating that the 9th Duke of Manchester occasionally inspected the troops and permitted the use of his estate.

A mural commemorating the Third Battalion of the County Armagh Regiment UVF is located at the junction of Montague Street and Ballymore Road in Tandragee.

=== World War I ===
On 4 August 1914, the UK entered WWI, prompting thousands of Ulster Volunteers to join the British Army. A public initiative formed to integrate the Ulster Volunteer Force into Kitchener's new Army, with hundreds enlisting from the Tandragee District. A number joined the Armagh Volunteer Battalion of the 9th Battalion Royal Irish Fusiliers. Between 60 and 70 volunteers, led by the 'Catch-my-Pal' flute band, paraded through Tandragee before departing from Madden Bridge Railway Station.

Peace Day celebrations took place in Tandragee on 19 July 1919, featuring a costume parade and a sports day in the Duke of Manchester's demesne. In the evening, a parade led by an effigy of the Kaiser made its way to the square, where the effigy was set ablaze.

The Tandragee war memorial was unveiled in April 1925, the first in County Armagh. A large crowd gathered for the unveiling ceremony. After the hymn 'O God Our Help in Ages Past' was performed, Major Shellington MP, a former officer of the 9th Royal Irish Fusiliers, unveiled the memorial. The obelisk, crafted from Newry granite, is nearly 25 feet (7.6 m) tall and is situated in the square near the castle gates.

=== World War II ===
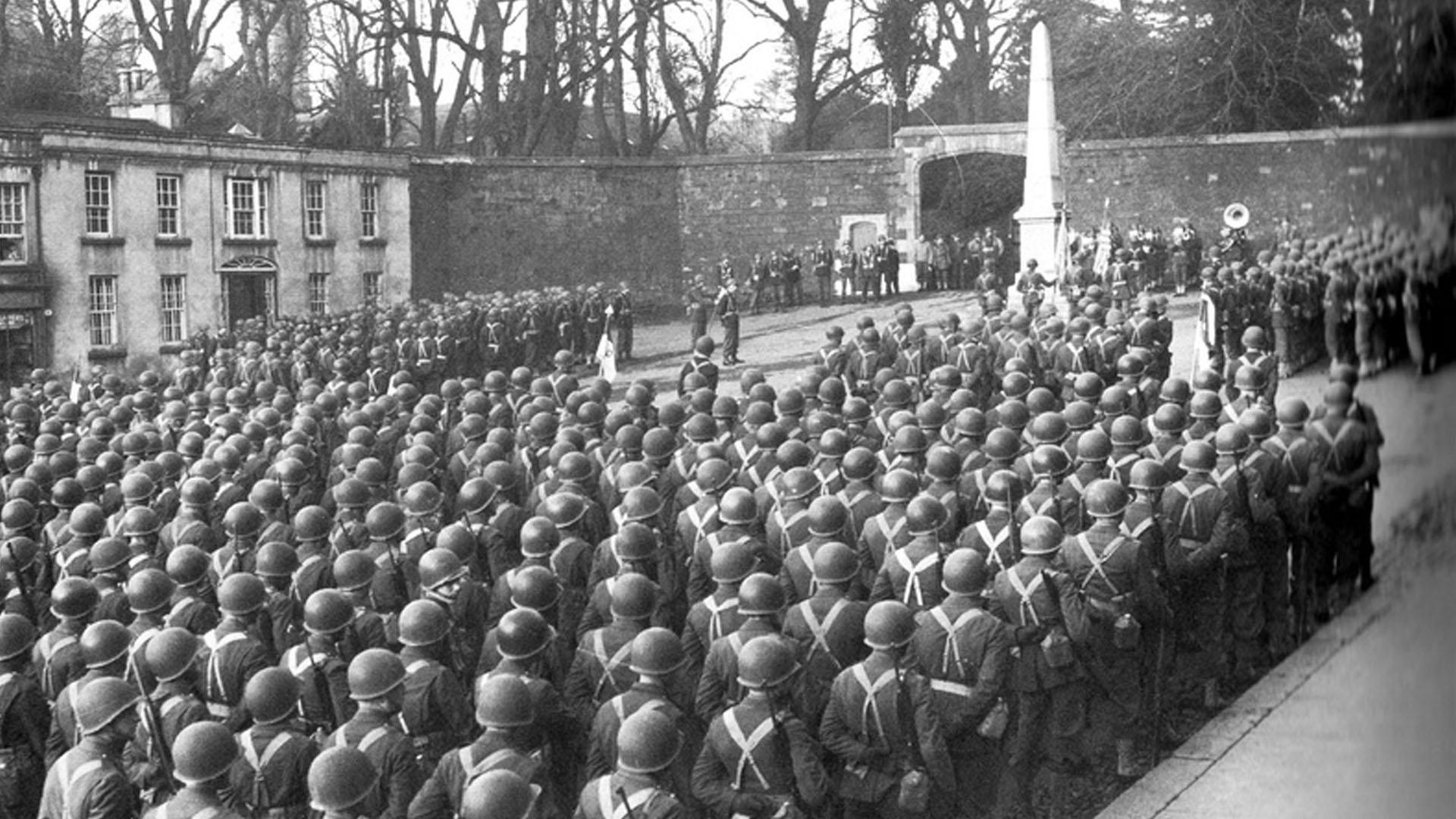
US 6th Cavalry in Tandragee on Armistice Day (1943)

On 25 May 1942, a Supermarine Spitfire BL325 crashed near Cordraine Orange Hall in Tandragee. The aircraft was involved in a coordinated training exercise alongside ground forces. During a low-altitude flight, the pilot clipped a tree, resulting in the plane landing upside down in a field.

Just over a year later, life in the town would experience a significant transformation with the arrival of American GIs from the 6th Cavalry. In 1943, Alexander Montagu, the 10th Duke of Manchester, leased Tandragee Castle to the United States Army for use during World War II.

Tandragee's links to the primary Belfast-Dublin railway, along with its proximity to the River Cusher and Newry Canal, positioned it as a strategic staging area for the United States Army in 1943. Tandragee railway station experienced the arrival of thousands of soldiers during World War II.

The 6th Cavalry unit conducted its final parade in Tandragee on 31 December 1943. Following this, the regiment transitioned to become the 6th Mechanized Cavalry Group, which comprised the 6th Cavalry Reconnaissance Squadron and the 28th Cavalry Reconnaissance Squadron. Reports suggest that General George S. Patton was a visitor to Tandragee Castle in 1943. While inspecting troops in Northern Ireland, he was guest of honour at a dance in the castle.

The Tandragee war memorial commemorates the soldiers who served in both World War I and World War II.

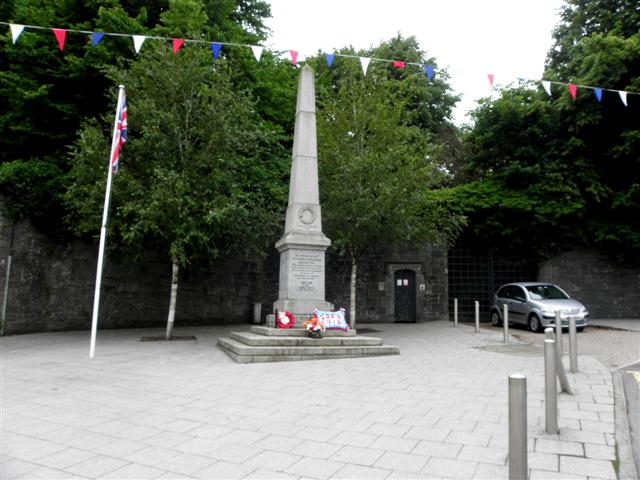
Tandragee war memorial (2012)

=== The Troubles ===
In February 1973, a confrontation occurred between three gunmen and British soldiers at the Tandragee power station, resulting in one of the gunmen being hit.

In 2000, Tandragee was scene of the Murders of Andrew Robb and David McIlwaine, two teenaged local Protestants who were unaffiliated with any paramilitary organization, by three members of the UVF Mid-Ulster Brigade and as part of an ongoing Loyalist feud between the UVF and LVF.

== Orange Order district ==
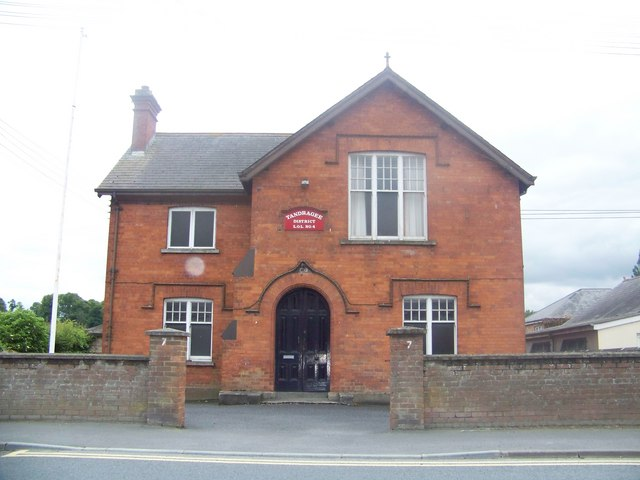
Tandragee District Hall (2009)

Tandragee District No.4 is one of 11 Orange Districts within County Armagh, comprising 21 private lodges and nearly 650 members. Every year on The Twelfth (12 July), the lodges within the district participate in the "Ring Ceremony" at the square, which includes a brief religious service. Tandragee is the only district to hold such an event.

Tandragee District No.4 hosts The Twelfth every 11 years, as part of a rotation in which each district lodge in County Armagh takes its turn to organise the event.

The district has its origins in 1796, the year following the establishment of the Orange Order. The inaugural Orange parades in Tandragee occurred on 12 July 1796, coinciding with the first Twelfth demonstration held at Lurgan Park. At that time, the district comprised 14 lodges. By 1834, the district was home to 27 lodges with a total of 810 members. In 1900, this number had decreased to 25 lodges with 750 members, while as of the early 21st century, there are 21 lodges with over 700 members.

On 12 July 1831, 10,000 Orangemen from across Ulster gathered in Tandragee to celebrate the Twelfth. They marched around Lord Mandeville's Castle (Tandragee Castle), which featured castle gates decorated with Orange arches and showcased between 80 and 90 Orange banners.

Tandragee District Hall was constructed in 1912 and initially established as a Protestant Temperance Hall. The building later functioned as a picture house during the 1940s and for later for dances, until it eventually transitioned to function as Tandragee District Hall. The hall also holds other events throughout the year.

On New Year's Day 2008, the hall was the target of an arson attack, during which the door was forcibly opened, the interior was ignited and the hall sustained significant smoke damage.

== Music ==
=== The Hills of Tandragee ===
A song written about the town, The Hills of Tandragee, originates from as early as 1970. It shares similarities with The Hills of Glensuili, differing mainly in place names and a few words that alter the political perspective. In the lyrics, the singer expresses to those witnessing his departure from Tandragee his desire for the Orange flag to soon be raised over its hills. He reflects on the birds and landscapes of Tandragee, hoping for peace and that "the time soon come around when I return".

Folk musician, from the nearby Portadown, Robin Morton speaking about the song, "Here's a fairly modern Orange song, and a great favorite among 'the brethren' because they can all join in on the last line of each verse. Dick Bamber, who gave it to me, is generally credited as the writer, but he tells me this is not correct. An old lady who lived beside him in Ballylisk, near Tandragee, 'wrote it years ago.' Just how long ago she wrote it he doesn't remember, but he says she gave it to him and he was the first to sing it in public. Now it's an Orange standard."

=== Lambeg drumming ===
Lambeg drumming is an important element of the County Armagh Orange Districts. A particular drumming rhythm linked to this tradition, named after Tandragee, is known as Tandragee Time and is commonly featured throughout County Armagh.

== Churches ==
There are a number of churches in Tandragee, including Church of Ireland, Catholic, Presbyterian, Baptist, Methodist and independent churches.

=== Ballymore Parish Church ===
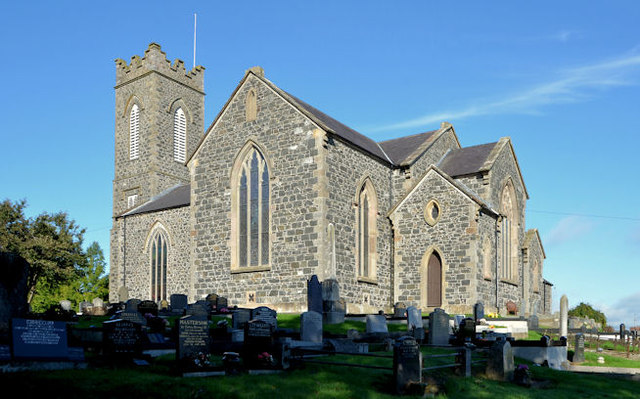
Ballymore Parish Church (2013)

Ballymore Parish Church dates to 1343 and is located beside Tandragee Castle on Church Street.

The church has a history spanning over 650 years, connected to the Dukes of Manchester until the mid-1950s. The church was mentioned in 14th-century records but it was burnt down by Edmond O'Hanlon in the Irish Rebellion of 1641. It was reconstructed in 1812 as it had become inadequate for the congregation's needs. During construction, remnants of the old walls were found, showing signs of fire damage from the Irish Rebellion of 1641.

=== St James's Catholic Church ===
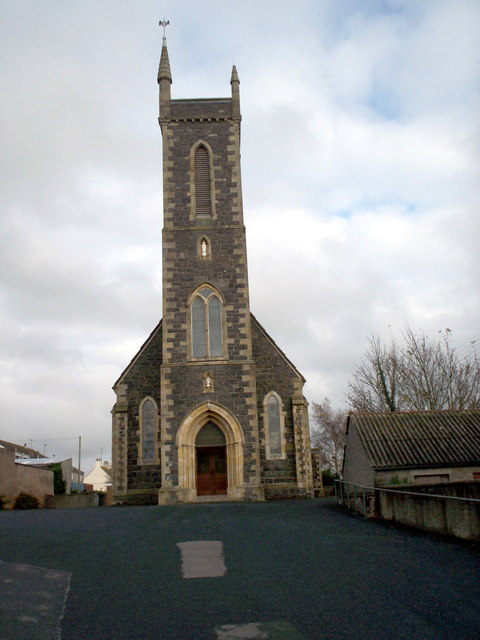
St James's Catholic Church (2007)

The Roman Catholic Church of Saint James the Apostle was built in 1852 and stands on Market Street. It is in the Catholic parish of Tandragee (Ballymore & Mullaghbrack) and the Archdiocese of Armagh.

=== Tandragee Presbyterian ===
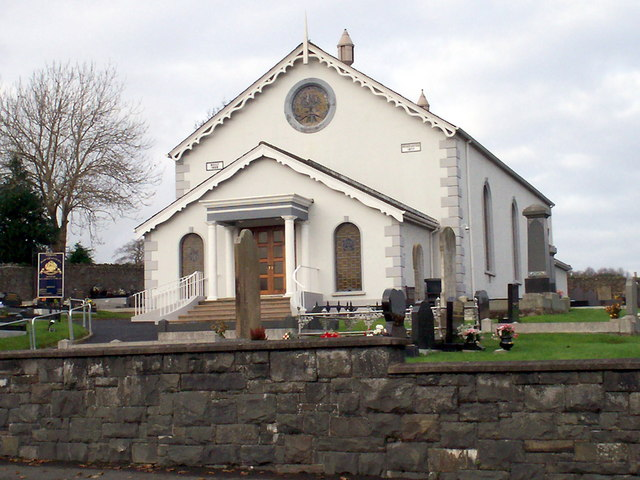
Tandragee Presbyterian Church (2007)

Tandragee Presbyterian Church was established, by Rev. Dr. Henry Cooke, in March 1829. The church building, which is located on the Markethill Road, was built in 1828 and renovated in 1977. The church hall serves as the venue for the 1st Tandragee Boys' Brigade and Girls' Brigade.

=== Tandragee Free Presbyterian ===
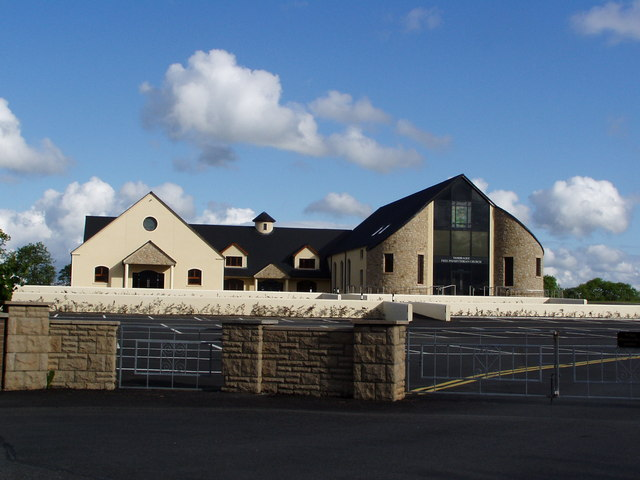
Tandragee Free Presbyterian Church (2009)

Tandragee Free Presbyterian Church was formed in 1967 and is located off the Portadown Road in the Willowfield housing estate.

In February 1967, Rev. Ian Paisley was invited to lead a gospel campaign at the Protestant Temperance Hall. Each evening, the hall was filled to capacity and, on the final two Sunday meetings, Cargans Memorial Orange Hall was used as an overflow venue, allowing additional participants to view the services via closed circuit television. The enthusiasm for this style of preaching was so significant that, as the mission drew to a close, several members of the congregation approached Rev. Paisley with a request to establish a separate Protestant witness, specifically a Free Presbyterian Church, in Tandragee. On Easter Sunday, 26 March 1967, Paisley delivered a sermon at the Temperance Hall, leading to the formation of the Tandragee Free Presbyterian Church.

On 18 October 2008, a new church complex spanning 16,000 sq ft (1,500 m^{2}) was opened to serve the growing congregation, located off the Portadown Road in the Willowfield housing estate. This facility features a sanctuary with seating for 450, a church hall that can accommodate 350 people, a prayer room for 130, and a youth fellowship area designed for 70 participants. The complex also has a minister's office, a space for parents with infants during services, committee room, garage, storage areas, recording studio and two kitchens.

=== Tandragee Baptist ===
Tandragee Baptist Church was formed on 29 February 1864 and is located on the Madden Road.

Approximately 2 years following the establishment of the church, the members resolved to construct a meeting house, contingent upon securing a suitable location. During a church meeting held on 11 October 1866, with thirteen members in attendance, it was decided to accept a site from William Montagu, 7th Duke of Manchester and to "solicit subscriptions towards the building of the chapel by means of letter and personal solicitation". The Duke of Manchester granted a lease for a parcel of land measuring 1 Rood and 27 perches, which housed an existing structure. The lease term was set for 91 years at an annual rate of 30 shillings (£1.50). It was agreed that the chapel would measure 60 by 30 ft (18.3 by 9.1 m), constructed with stone sourced from the nearby Tullyhue quarry. Initially, the funds raised were sufficient only to construct the walls, leading to a temporary halt in progress. However, work resumed shortly after a donation from Mr. E D Atkinson allowing for the completion of the roof. By the close of 1867, the church was opened without any outstanding debts, although certain tasks were still pending completion as late as 1871.

The final service at the old church building took place on the afternoon of Sunday, 22 April 2001. Shortly after, in early May 2001, the structure was demolished. The building had been deemed structurally unsound. It lacked proper foundations, the roof beams were severely affected by dry rot, and several beams were precariously positioned on the wall above the windows without adequate support. A new church building was opened in 2002.

The church encountered criticism and faced a prosecution file in November 2020 for conducting services that violated COVID-19 restrictions.

=== Tandragee Methodist ===
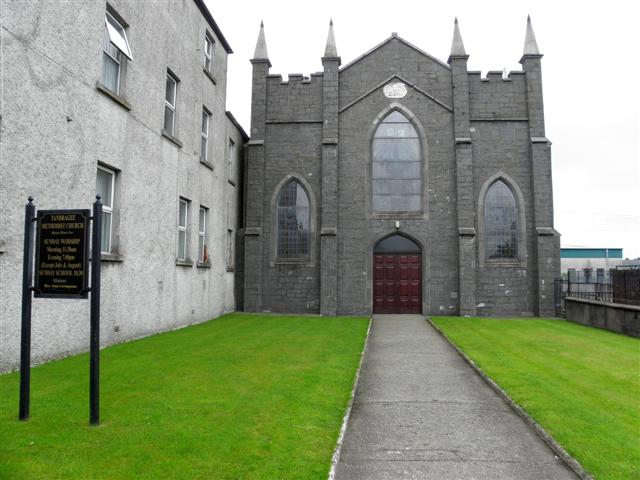
Tandragee Methodist Church (2012)

Tandragee Methodist Church was built in 1835 and is located on Market Street.

== Education ==
Schools in the area include:

- Tandragee Primary School
- Tandragee Junior High School
- Tandragee Nursery
- Button Moon Play Group

== Sport ==
=== Motorcycling ===
The Tandragee 100 is a motorcycle race that has been held in the area since 1958. This event, a 100 miles (160 km) handicap race, has involved a number of notable motorcycle road racers, including: Guy Martin, Joey Dunlop, Ryan Farquhar and Michael Dunlop. The race did not take place during 2020 or 2021 due to COVID-19, was cancelled in 2023 due to insurance costs and again in 2024 due to lack of course resurfacing. The event occurred in 2025 and was won by Michael Dunlop who set a course record (of 111.58 mph) on his final circuit.

=== Golf ===
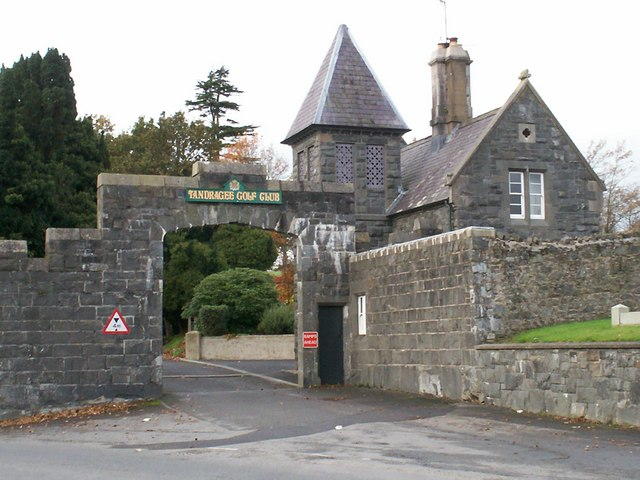
Entrance to Tandragee Golf Club

Tandragee Golf Club is located within the demesne of Tandragee Castle. It is a 5,589 metre, par 71 hilly parkland course. It was originally laid out as a private course for the 9th Duke of Manchester on his estate in 1911. In 1922, the golf club became affiliated to the Golfing Union of Ireland.

=== Other sports ===
Tandragee Rovers play in the Mid-Ulster Football League. The Tayto Tandragee Soapbox Derby was established in 2015 and has since raised funds for the Royal British Legion in Tandragee, attracting over 7,500 visitors in 2019.

== Industry and transport ==
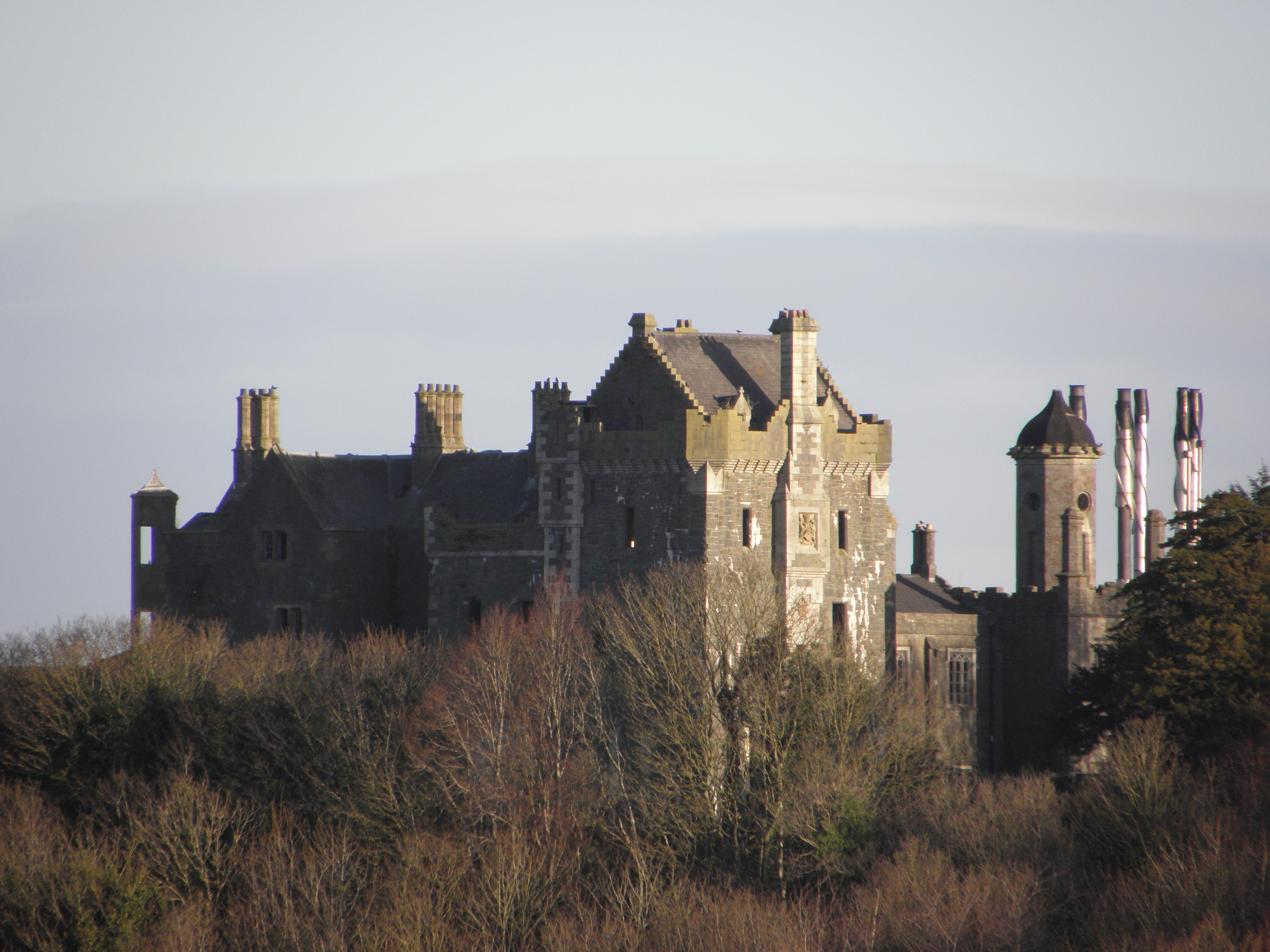
Tandragee Castle

Thomas Sinton opened a mill in town in the 1880s, an expansion of his firm from its original premises at nearby Laurelvale – a model village which he built. Sintons' Mill, on the banks of the Cusher River, remained in production until the 1990s. The mill caught fire in October 2024 with 6 appliances from the NI Fire and Rescue Service in attendance.

White's Mill was established by Thomas Henry White in 1841 as a corn and flour mill along the banks of the Cusher River. It is now Northern Ireland's largest oat miller and breakfast cereal producer. In 2023, Armagh City, Banbridge and Craigavon Borough Council approved plans for White's Oat's to move to new premises in Craigavon.

The potato-crisp company Tayto has a factory and offices beside Tandragee Castle which offers guided tours. In November 2019, Prime Minister Boris Johnson toured UK businesses, which included a visit to the Tayto factory.

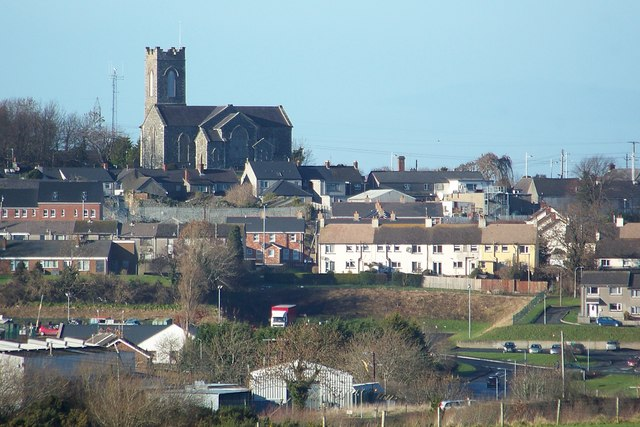
St Mark's Church overlooking part of Tandragee

Taranto Ltd. manufactures concrete products at a 70 acres (28 ha) production site situated on Scarva Road.

Tandragee Wastewater Treatment Works, owned by NI Water, is located on the Scarva Road.

Northern Ireland Electricity has an interconnector to County Louth in the Republic of Ireland from the Portadown Road in the outskirts of the town.

Tanderagee railway station opened on 6 January 1852 and was shut on 4 January 1965.

== Demography ==
=== 2021 census ===
Tandragee had a population of 3,545 people in the 2021 census. Of these:

- 76.92% were from a Protestant background and 10.75% were from a Roman Catholic background

=== 2011 census ===
Tandragee had a population of 3,486 people (1,382 households) in 2011. Of these:

- 23.26% were under 16 years old and 12.62% were aged 65 and above.
- 50.06% of the population were male and 49.94% were female.
- 81.84% were from a Protestant background and 11.70% were from a Roman Catholic background

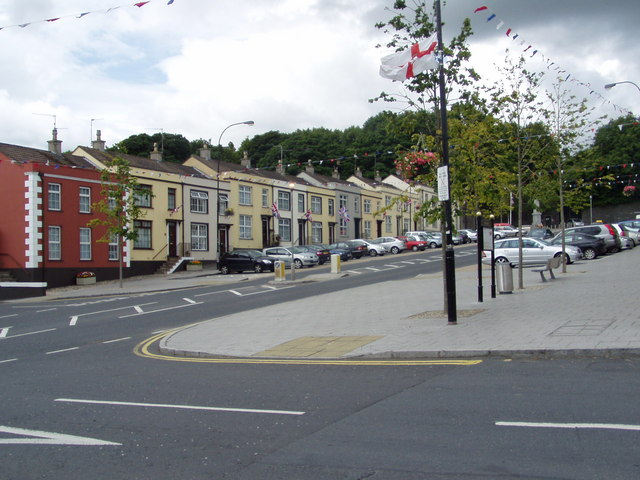
The Square (2009)

=== 2001 census ===
For the 2001 census, Tandragee was classified as an intermediate settlement by the NI Statistics and Research Agency (NISRA) (i.e. with population between 2,050 and 4,500 people). On census day (29 April 2001), there were 3,050 people living in Tandragee. Of these:

- 24.9% were aged under 16 years and 14.3% were aged 60 and over
- 48.0% of the population were male and 50.0% were female
- 86.9% were from a Protestant background and 10.5% were from a Roman Catholic background
- 2.0% of people aged 16–74 were unemployed.

== See also ==
- Tandragee Idol, an Iron Age stone figure
