= Laurelvale =

Village in County Armagh, Northern Ireland

Coordinates: 54.36876°N 6.45139°W

Laurelvale: Irish: Tamhnaigh Bhealtaine
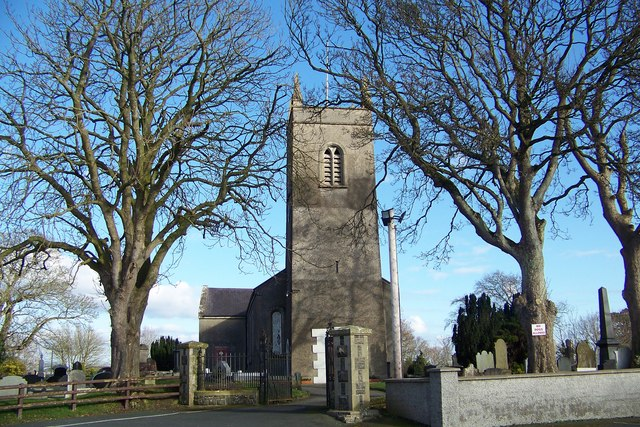
- Mullavilly parish church

- Location within Northern Ireland
- Population: 1,288 (2011 census)
- Irish grid reference: J006478
  - Belfast: 25.5 mi (41.0 km)
- District: Armagh
- County: County Armagh
- Country: Northern Ireland
- Sovereign state: United Kingdom
- Post town: CRAIGAVON
- Postcode district: BT62
- Dialling code: 028, +44 28
- UK Parliament: Newry & Armagh
- NI Assembly: Newry & Armagh

Laurelvale is a village in County Armagh, Northern Ireland. It is beside the smaller village of Mullavilly and the two are sometimes referred to as Laurelvale-Mullavilly or Mullavilly-Laurelvale. The village is three miles south of Portadown and 1.5 miles northwest of Tandragee. It had a population of 1,288 people in the 2011 census.

== Name ==
Laurelvale is within the townland of Tamnaghvelton (formerly Tawnavaltiny, from Irish Tamhnaigh Bhealtaine, meaning 'Bealtaine field'). Laurelvale was taken from the name of a mansion that was built in the 19th century. Mullavilly was named after the townland in which it lies. The name comes from Irish Mullach a' Bhile, meaning 'hilltop of the sacred tree'.

== History ==
Laurelvale was founded in the 1850s by Thomas Sinton JP (1826–1887) to house the workers in his linen mill of Thomas Sinton & Co. Ltd, which was in the village. At its height, Sintons' Mill had over 1000 workers. The mill has since been demolished. The company remained in family ownership until 1945 when it was taken over by the Ministry of Defence and operated by Hoffmans (who made ball bearings for gun turrets). The Sinton family also ran mills and bleach-works in Tandragee, Killyleagh, Tullylish and at Ravernet outside Hillsborough, County Down.

Schedule of rental of the estates of JOHN Earl of SANDWICH and PETER DE SALIS, in the Manor of Clare in County of Armagh, 1802.

Thomas Sinton also built a large house in the village, Laurelvale House, which, following the Second World War, was the home of Michael Torrens-Spence, Lord Lieutenant of County Armagh. Laurelvale House has since been demolished to make way for housing development.

Sintons' Mill

== Schools ==
- Mullavilly Primary School

== Churches ==
- Mullavilly Parish Church
- Kilmore Parish Church

== Sport ==
Laurelvale F.C. has a ground in the Laurel Park area of the village. The football club currently play in the Mid-Ulster Football League Intermediate B Division.

Laurelvale Cricket Club has a clubhouse on Mullavilly Road and are currently competing in the NCU League Section 2, having just missed out on promotion in the 2015 season by way of Net Run Rate. Lee Edgar had a club record breaking season with 63 wickets winning the club's and league's Player of the Year.

== Demography ==
=== 2011 census ===
In the 2011 census Laurelvale-Mulavilly had a population of 1,288 people. Of these:

- 99.46% were from the white (including Irish Traveller) ethnic group;
- 7.53% belong to or were brought up in the Catholic religion and 86.96% belong to or were brought up in a 'Protestant and Other Christian (including Christian related)' religion; and
- 78.49% indicated that they had a British national identity, 5.75% had an Irish national identity and 23.68% had a Northern Irish national identity*.

=== 2001 census ===
Mullavilly-Laurelvale is classified as a village by the Northern Ireland Statistics and Research Agency (NISRA). On census day (29 April 2001) there were 1,258 people living in Mullavilly-Laurelvale.
