= John Alexander Sinton =

Canadian-born British malariologist and soldier

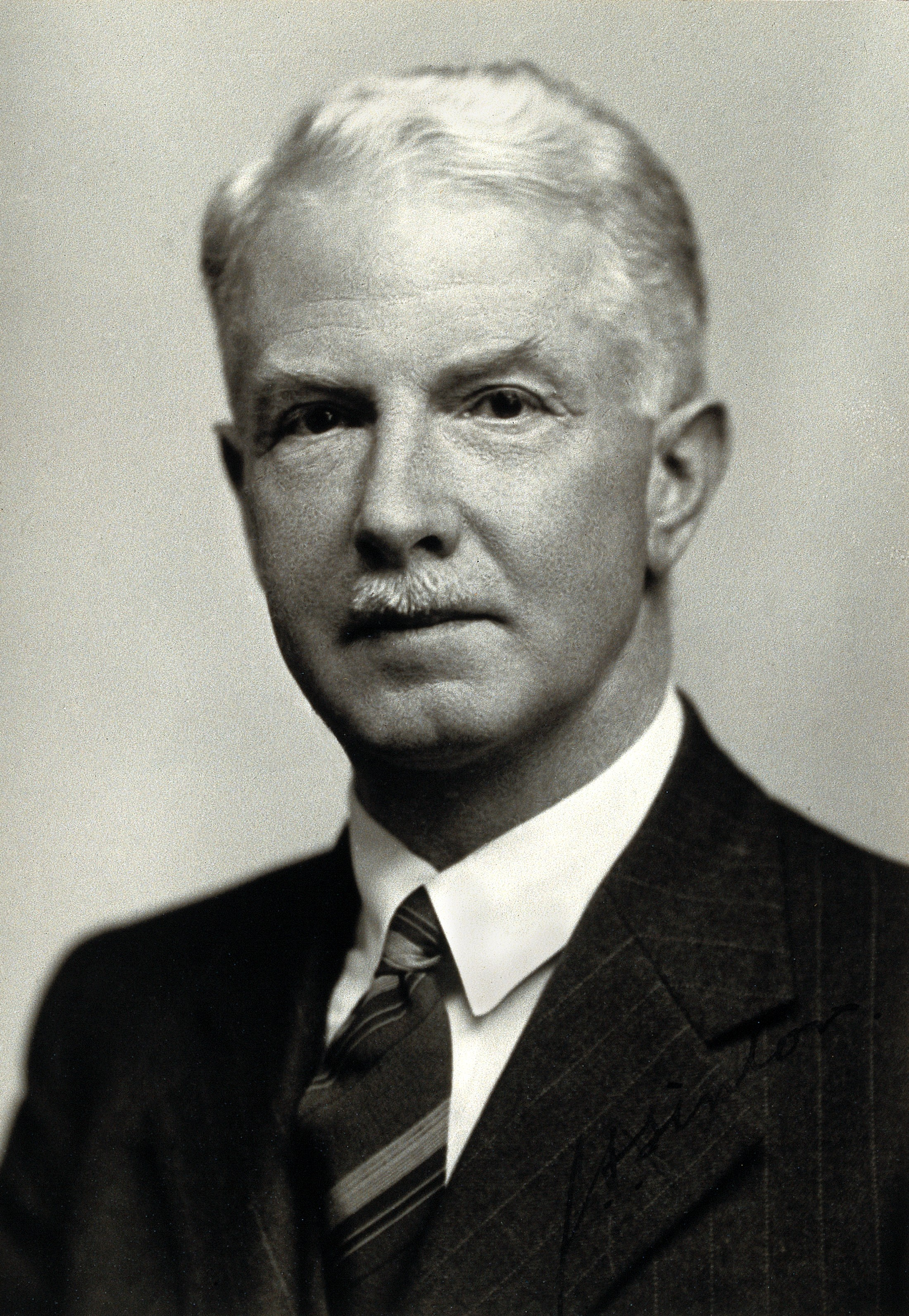
- Born: 2 December 1884; Victoria, British Columbia, Canada
- Died: 25 March 1956 (aged 71); Cookstown, County Tyrone, Northern Ireland
- Burial place: Claggan Presbyterian Cemetery, Cookstown
- Relatives: Thomas Sinton (uncle); James Pringle (cousin); Ernest Walton (cousin)
- Military career
- Allegiance: United Kingdom
- Branch: British Indian Army
- Service years: 1911–1921; 1939–1943
- Rank: Brigadier
- Units: Indian Medical Service
- Conflicts: First World War; Second World War
- Awards: Victoria Cross; Officer of the Order of the British Empire; Mentioned in dispatches (6); Order of St. George, 4th Class (Russia); Fellow of the Royal Society; Manson Medal
- Other work: Malariologist

Brigadier John Alexander Sinton (2 December 1884 – 25 March 1956) was a British medical doctor, malariologist, soldier, and a recipient of the Victoria Cross, the highest award for gallantry in the face of the enemy that can be awarded to British and Commonwealth forces.

== Early life ==
Sinton was born in Victoria, British Columbia, the third of the seven children of Walter Lyon Sinton (1860–1930) and his wife, Isabella Mary, née Pringle (1860–1924), a family of Quaker linen manufacturers from Northern Ireland. On his mother's side he was a cousin of James Pringle, and a nephew of Thomas Sinton and cousin of Ernest Walton on his father's. In 1890 they returned to Ulster where he was educated and lived for the rest of his life. He studied at the Royal Belfast Academical Institution and read medicine at the Queen's University, Belfast, where he graduated in 1908 as first in his year. He went on to attain degrees from the University of Cambridge (1910) and the University of Liverpool (1911).

Sinton joined the Indian Medical Service in 1911, coming first in the entrance examinations, but before being posted to India was seconded as the Queen's University research scholar to the Liverpool School of Tropical Medicine where his contact with Sir Ronald Ross may have influenced his later career as a malariologist.

== Military career ==
Sinton was 31 years old and a captain in the Indian Medical Service (IMS), Indian Army, during the First World War. On 21 January 1916 at the Orah Ruins, Mesopotamia, Captain Sinton attended to the wounded under very heavy fire and the citation to his VC reads:

For most conspicuous bravery and devotion to duty. Although shot through both arms and through the side, he refused to go to hospital, and remained as long as daylight lasted, attending to his duties under very heavy fire. In three previous actions Captain Sinton displayed the utmost bravery.

Sinton later achieved the rank of brigadier (1943), was awarded the Russian Order of St George and mentioned in dispatches six times.

In 1921 he transferred from the military to the civil branch of the IMS which he continued to serve with until 1936.

Painting of Capt. Sinton attending a wounded soldier at Orah Ruins, Mesopotamia

== Medical career ==
In July 1921 he was put in charge of the quinine and malaria inquiry under the newly formed Central Malaria Bureau. He was appointed the first director of the malaria survey of India at Kasauli in 1925 where he worked with Sir S. R. Christophers.

He became Manson fellow at the London School of Hygiene and Tropical Medicine and at the malaria laboratory of the Ministry of Health at Horton Hospital, near Epsom. He also became adviser on malaria to the Ministry of Health. With the outbreak of the Second World War, Sinton was recalled as an IMS reservist and commanded a hospital in India. At the age of fifty-five he was again retired, but was appointed consultant malariologist to the east African force and later to Middle East command, retiring with the honorary rank of brigadier in August 1943.

He then worked as consultant malariologist to the War Office, travelling widely to Assam, Australia, Burma, Ceylon, India, New Guinea, and the Solomon Islands, where his expertise in malaria was invaluable. Further military decorations resulted from this period, after which Sinton returned to Northern Ireland and retired to Cookstown. He was elected Fellow of the Royal Society in 1946.

== Other activities ==
Sinton is the only Fellow of the Royal Society to have received a Victoria Cross. In his retirement he served as Deputy Lieutenant for County Tyrone and, in 1953, as High Sheriff of Tyrone.

At Kasauli, Sinton met Eadith Seymour Steuart-Martin (1894–1977), daughter of Edwin Steuart-Martin and Ada May Martin (née Martin), whom he married on 19 September 1923. Their daughter, Eleanor Isabel Mary Sinton, was born at Kasauli on 9 December 1924.

His name is remembered in Sinton Halls, a student housing block at the Queen's University, Belfast, where he sat on the senate and was a Pro-Chancellor. The Sinton Medical and Dental Centre at Thiepval Barracks, Lisburn is also named in his honour. Others honoured Sinton by naming three mosquito species, Aedes sintoni, Anopheles sintoni, and Anopheles sintonoides, one sandfly species, Sergentomyia sintoni, and one subgenus Sintonius of the genus Phlebotomus, after him.

Stinton described and named the species Phlebotomus (Paraphlebotomus) alexandri. and Prowazekia urinaria (now Parabodo caudatus).

He died at his home at Slaghtfreedan Lodge, Cookstown, County Tyrone, on 25 March 1956 and was buried with full military honours on 28 March at Claggan Presbyterian cemetery in Cookstown. Colonel H. W. Mulligan in an obituary in the British Medical Journal described him thus:

Sinton had an exceptionally quick, receptive, and retentive brain, but his greatness sprang not so much from his unusual intellectual gifts as from the simple qualities of absolute integrity and tremendous industry

His Victoria Cross is displayed at the Army Medical Services Museum at Aldershot.

== Bibliography ==
- Gliddon, Gerald (2005). The Sideshows. VCs of the First World War. Gloucestershire, England: Sutton Publishing. ISBN 978-0-7509-2084-1.
