= List of commanders of the British 3rd Division =

Military unit officers

3rd Division 3rd Infantry Division 3rd Armoured Division 3rd (United Kingdom) Division 3rd (United Kingdom) Mechanised Division
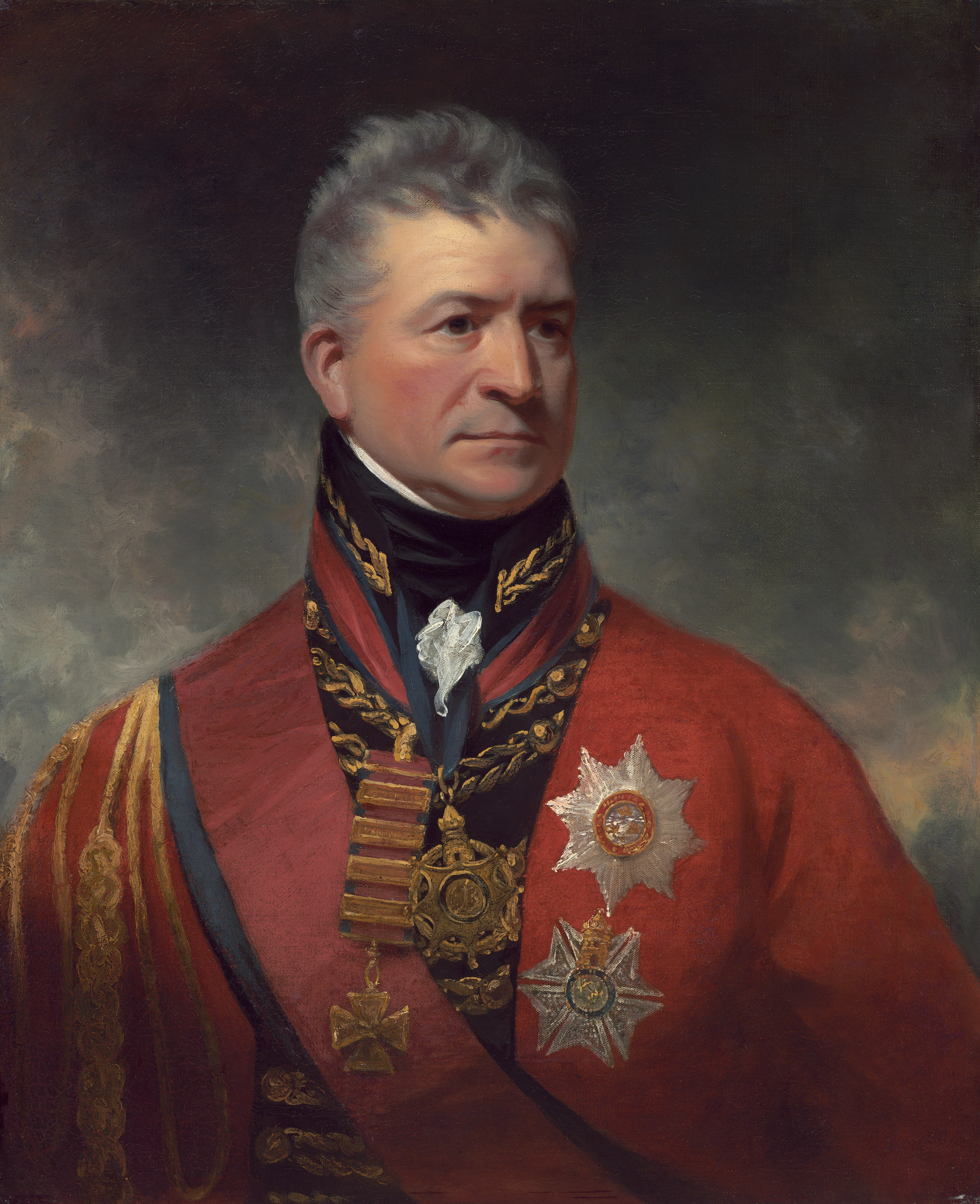
- Thomas Picton, the commanding officer of the 3rd Division for the majority of the Peninsular War
- Active: Raised and disbanded numerous times between 1809 and the present
- Country: United Kingdom
- Branch: British Army
- Engagements: Napoleonic Wars; Crimean War; Second Boer War; First World War; Second World War; Iraq War
- Website: Official website Division's twitter account

Commanders
- Current commander: James Martin

The 3rd Division is an infantry division of the British Army and was first formed in 1809. The division is commanded by a general officer commanding (GOC), who receives orders from a level above him in the chain of command, and then uses the forces within the division to undertake the mission assigned. In addition to directing the tactical battle in which the division is involved, the GOC oversees a staff and the administrative, logistical, medical, training, and discipline concerns of the division. Since its founding, the division has had 69 permanent GOCs over a history that has spanned more than 200 years.

Prior to 1809, the British Army did not use divisional formations. As the British military grew in size during the Napoleonic Wars, the need arose for such an implementation in order to better organise forces for administrative, logistical, and tactical reasons. The 3rd Division was formed on 18 June 1809 by Lieutenant-General Arthur Wellesley, and served in the Peninsular War (part of the Napoleonic Wars). The division's first commanding officer, Major-General John Mackenzie, was killed in action at the Battle of Talavera in 1809. After the Peninsular War ended in 1814, the division was disbanded only to be re-raised the following year when the War of the Seventh Coalition broke out. The division then fought at the Battles of Quatre Bras and Waterloo, and then marched into France where it became part of the subsequent British army of occupation. The division was broken-up, once more, in 1817. It was next raised for service in the Crimean War (1853–1856). The division was next formed to take part in the Second Boer War, in 1899. When the need for divisions subsided, the following year, the division was disbanded to provide garrisons for various static locations.

In 1902, a new 3rd Division was formed as a permanent standing formation and not raised for a particular crisis. During the 20th century, the division fought in the First and Second World Wars. Major-General Hubert Hamilton, the division's first commander during the First World War, was killed in action in 1914. During the Second World War, the division played a prominent role in the Allied invasion of German-occupied France in 1944. During that campaign, Major-General Tom Rennie was wounded in action. Following the Second World War, the division took part in the Suez Crisis, and was deployed to Cyprus in 1964, during raising tensions in the ongoing dispute over the island. In 1977, the division was converted into an armoured formation, and was deployed to Germany as part of the British Army of the Rhine. The division became a mechanised infantry formation in 1992 and was moved to the UK. During the mid-1990s, the division took part in peacekeeping operations in Bosnia and Herzegovina (Stabilisation Force in Bosnia and Herzegovina). In the 21st century, the division undertook deployments to Afghanistan and Iraq. As of late 2021, Major General James Martin commands the division.

== General officer commanding ==
General officer commanding
No.	Appointment date	Rank	General officer commanding	Notes	Source(s)
1	18 June 1809	Major-General	John Mackenzie	The division was formed for the first time, during the Peninsular War, from troops based in Portugal. Mackenzie also directly controlled one of the division's brigades. He was killed in action, at the Battle of Talavera on 28 July 1809.	
2	28 July 1809	Major-General	Robert Craufurd	Likewise commanded one of the division's brigades, as well as the division itself. On 22 February 1810, Craufurd's brigade was used to form the Light Division, of which he took command.	
3	22 February 1810	Major-General	Thomas Picton	Picton was wounded during the Siege of Badajoz, in 1812.	
Acting	March 1812	Lieutenant-Colonel	John Wallace		
3	March 1812	Major-General	Thomas Picton	Picton returned to command, but was invalided home during June.	
Acting	28 June 1812	Major-General	Edward Pakenham		
Acting	26 January 1813	Major-General	Charles Colville	When Picton returned to the Iberian Peninsula, Colville reverted to commanding a brigade within the division.	
3	May 1813	Major-General	Thomas Picton	On returning to the Iberian Peninsula, Picton was given command of his old division. Picton went on sick leave in September.	
Acting	8 September 1813	Major-General	Charles Colville		
Acting	September 1813	Major-General	Manley Power		
Acting	October 1813	Major-General	Charles Colville		
3	December 1813	Major-General	Thomas Picton	After Picton returned from sick leave, he resumed command of the division. He maintained this role until the conclusion of the Peninsular War, in 1814, when the division was disbanded in France.	
4	11 April 1815	Lieutenant-General	Charles Alten	On 11 April 1815, the division was reformed in Southern Netherlands. Alten was wounded during the Battle of Waterloo.	
Acting	18 June 1815	Major-General	Friedrich Kielmansegg	Kielmansegg took command of the division during the Battle of Waterloo, after Alten was wounded and forced to retire.	
4	19 June 1815	Lieutenant-General	Charles Alten	Alten resumed command of the division, once the Battle of Waterloo ended.	
Temporary	18 July 1815	Major-General	Thomas Bradford	Alten returned to the UK as a result of his injuries, and Bradford took temporary command.	
5	30 November 1815	Lieutenant-General	Charles Colville	On this date, the British Army in France was reorganised into an Army of Occupation, and Colville was given command of the division. The division was broken-up, in France, on 1 April 1817.	
6	18 August 1854	Lieutenant-General	Richard England	The division was formed in Varna, Ottoman Bulgaria, from British troops who had been assembled, and had prepared to move to the Crimean peninsular during the Crimean War.	
7	5 August 1855	Lieutenant-General	William Eyre	Eyre retained command of the division until 1856 and the conclusion of the Crimean War. With the end of hostilities, the division was disbanded in Crimea.	
8	9 October 1899	Lieutenant-General	William Gatacre	A new 3rd Division was formed in England, and then moved to southern Africa to fight in the Second Boer War.	
9	11 April 1900	Lieutenant-General	Herbert Chermside	The division was broken up during July 1900, while still in southern Africa.	
10	1 April 1902	Major-General	Bruce Hamilton	This marked the first time the 3rd Division was formed as a permanent formation, and not raised on an ad hoc basis for a particular war. However, the division was created with only one brigade, with an intent that it would be mobilised to full strength on the outbreak of war. Hamilton held command until 2 May 1904, after which there was no divisional commander appointed until 1907.	
11	May 1907	Major-General	William Franklyn	In 1907, the 4th Division was reorganised as the 3rd Division. On the Army List dated March 1907, the 4th Division is recorded as being commanded by Franklyn. On the next Army List, dated May 1907, his command remained intact but with the division having been renumbered to the 3rd.	
12	1 June 1910	Major-General	Henry Rawlinson		
13	1 June 1914	Major-General	Hubert Hamilton	Under Hamilton, the division was mobilised for the First World War. Hamilton was killed in action, in France, on 15 October 1914.	
14	15 October 1914	Major-General	Colin Mackenzie	Mackenzie was invalided back to the UK on 29 October 1914	
Temporary	29 October 1914	Major-General	Frederick Wing		
15	21 November 1914	Major-General	Aylmer Haldane		
16	7 August 1916	Major-General	Cyril Deverell	At the conclusion of the First World War, the division entered Germany and became part of the occupation force, the British Army of the Rhine.	
17	10 June 1919	Major-General	Robert Whigham	Elements of the division were used to create the 'Northern Division' of the British Army of the Rhine, while the rest of the division was demobilised and returned to England where it was reformed.	
18	18 July 1922	Major-General	William Heneker		
19	3 July 1926	Major-General	John Burnett-Stuart		
20	18 May 1930	Major-General	Harry Knox		
21	22 November 1932	Major-General	Walter Pitt-Taylor		
22	15 October 1934	Major-General	Robert Gordon-Finlayson		
23	28 April 1936	Major-General	Cecil Heywood		
24	1 December 1936	Major-General	Denis Bernard		
25	28 August 1939	Major-General	Bernard Montgomery	Under Montgomery's tenure, the division was mobilised for service in the Second World War and deployed to France. During the Second World War, the division was known as the 3rd Infantry Division.	
Acting	30 May 1940	Brigadier	Kenneth Anderson		
25	3 June 1940	Major-General	Bernard Montgomery	The division was evacuated via Dunkirk to the UK, following the Allied defeat in the Battle of France.	
Acting	22 July 1940	Brigadier	John Whitaker		
26	25 July 1940	Major-General	James Gammell		
27	20 November 1941	Major-General	Eric Hayes		
28	15 December 1942	Major-General	William Ramsden		
29	12 December 1943	Major-General	Tom Rennie	As the 3rd Canadian Division would be working in close proximity to the formation in northwest Europe, Rennie's division was unofficially styled as the 3rd British Infantry Division. On 6 June 1944, the division landed in Normandy as part of the first stage of the Allied liberation of Western Europe. Rennie was wounded in action on 13 June 1944, while fighting in France.	
Acting	13 June 1944	Brigadier	Edward Cass		
30	23 June 1944	Major-General	Lashmer Whistler		
31	22 January 1945	Major-General	Alexander Galloway	The division took part in the Western Allied invasion of Germany, and ended the Second World War in Germany.	
30	25 February 1945	Major-General	Lashmer Whistler	In November 1945, the division was transferred to the Mandate for Palestine. Over the next two years, it would move between Palestine and Egypt.	
32	January 1947	Major-General	John Churcher		
33	1947	Major-General	George Wood	The division was disbanded on 30 June 1947, after having returned to the UK from the Middle East.	
34	1 January 1951	Major-General	Hugh Stockwell	On 14 December 1950, the division was reformed to provide a divisional-size strategic reserve to the British Army, to supplement the existing strategic reserve of the 16th Parachute Brigade. The division was dispatched to Egypt, to garrison the Suez Canal, in November 1951. Stockwell was appointed commander at the turn of the new year, and was also the commanding officer of the East Anglian District.	
35	2 May 1952	Major-General	Nigel Poett		
32	1 April 1954	Major-General	John Churcher	In December 1954, the division returned to the UK from the Middle East. In 1956, the division was assigned to the British invasion force during the Suez Crisis.	
36	21 March 1957	Major-General	George Gordon-Lennox	During Lennox's tenure, "infantry" was dropped from the division's title.	
37	1 November 1959	Major-General	Charles Harington		
38	2 October 1961	Major-General	Vivian Street		
39	4 September 1962	Major-General	Michael Carver	In February 1964, the division HQ was temporarily deployed to Cyprus.	
40	1 August 1964	Major-General	Cecil Blacker		
41	1 June 1966	Major-General	Anthony Deane-Drummond		
42	1 July 1968	Major-General	Terence McMeekin		
43	22 June 1970	Major-General	Glyn Gilbert		
44	28 June 1972	Major-General	Richard Worsley		
45	26 June 1974	Major-General	Robin Carnegie		
46	5 June 1976	Major-General	Michael Walsh	In late 1977, the 3rd Division was disbanded in the UK. It was reformed as the 3rd Armoured Division, which was organised in Germany as part of the British Army on the Rhine, during January 1978.	
47	30 November 1978	Major-General	Henry Dalzell-Payne		
48	3 November 1980	Major-General	Norman Arthur		
49	1 November 1982	Major-General	Antony Walker		
50	8 November 1984	Major-General	David Ramsbotham		
51	13 March 1987	Major-General	Edward Jones		
52	17 June 1988	Major-General	Michael Wilkes		
53	8 June 1990	Major-General	Christopher Wallace		
54	13 April 1992	Major-General	Hew Pike	The division left Germany in September 1992 and moved to the UK, where it was reformed as the 3rd (United Kingdom) Division in October.	
55	11 April 1994	Major-General	Mike Jackson	Between October 1995 and late 1997, the division rotated command of the Multi-National Division (South-West) with the 1st Armoured Division, as part of the peacekeeping force in Bosnia and Herzegovina.	
56	5 July 1996	Major-General	Cedric Delves	By this point, the division was also known as the 3rd (UK) Mechanised Division.	
57	15 January 1999	Major General	Richard Dannatt	By the time of Dannatt's appointment, the hyphen between "major" and "general" was no longer being used.	
58	8 November 2000	Major General	John McColl	Following the United States invasion of Afghanistan, in December 2001, the divisional HQ commanded a multinational brigade in Kabul, as part of the International Security Assistance Force. The HQ subsequently handed over control of this brigade to other NATO forces.	
59	2 July 2003	Major General	Graeme Lamb	During Lamb's tenure, the division was deployed to Iraq, as part of Operation Telic and following the conclusion of the 2003 invasion. It also took command of the Multi-National Division (South-East) until December 2003, when the latter assumed control of the British and other allied elements in southeast Iraq. Elements of the division would subsequently undertake tours of duty in Iraq and Afghanistan.	
60	27 June 2005	Major General	Richard Shirreff	Between July 2006 and January 2007, Shirreff deployed to Iraq with the divisional HQ to command the Multi-National Division (South-East).	
61	29 October 2007	Major General	Barney White-Spunner	During 2008, White-Spunner also commanded the Multi-National Division (South-East) in Iraq.	
62	3 July 2009	Major General	James Everard		
63	6 June 2011	Major General	John Lorimer		
64	20 April 2013	Major General	James Cowan		
65	11 May 2015	Major General	Patrick Sanders		(Note: In 2015, Brigadier General Mike Tarsa, a United States Army officer, was assigned to the division as a deputy commander. He was the first American to hold such a position. In 2016, he was replaced by Brigadier General Doug Crissman. Brigadier General Matthew J. Van Wagenen followed in April 2018.)
66	9 December 2016	Major General	Nick Borton		
67	3 December 2018	Major General	James Swift		
68	10 February 2020	Major General	Michael Elviss		
69	18 October 2021	Major General	James Martin		
70	1 July 2024	Major General	Oliver Brown		
71	3 September 2026	Major General	Henry Searby	Incumbent	
