= Edward Cass =

British Army officer (1898–1968)

Brigadier Edward Cass CBE DSO & Bar MC
- Born: 3 March 1898; Ravenglass, Cumberland, England
- Died: 31 August 1968 (aged 70)
- Military career
- Allegiance: United Kingdom
- Branch: British Army
- Service years: 1916–1949
- Rank: Brigadier
- Nickname: "Copper"
- Service number: 11988
- Unit: King's Own Yorkshire Light Infantry
- Commands: 1st Battalion, King's Own Yorkshire Light Infantry; 11th Infantry Brigade; 8th Infantry Brigade; 3rd Infantry Division; 184th Infantry Brigade; 114th Infantry Brigade
- Conflicts: First World War; Second World War
- Awards: Commander of the Order of the British Empire; Distinguished Service Order & Bar; Military Cross

Brigadier Edward Earnshaw Eden Cass CBE, DSO & Bar, MC (3 March 1898 – 31 August 1968) was a senior British Army officer who served in the First World War and the Second World War. He was briefly acting General Officer Commanding the 3rd Infantry Division just after the Normandy landings.

== Military career ==
Educated at the Royal Military College, Sandhurst, Cass was commissioned into the King's Own Yorkshire Light Infantry on 27 October 1916 during the First World War. He was awarded the Military Cross and the Distinguished Service Order for his actions on the Western Front. The citation for his MC reads:

For conspicuous gallantry and leadership. This officer led his company in the attack straight to its objective, rushing and capturing many machine guns and prisoners. On arrival he reorganised his company, and with another on his right secured a further 400 yards of ground, which he skilfully held and consolidated, repulsing repeated bombing attacks. He set a personal example of the highest order to his company.

Promoted to acting lieutenant-colonel, Cass became commanding officer of 1st Battalion The King's Own Yorkshire Light Infantry in April 1940 and was deployed to Norway in command of his regiment at an early stage of the Second World War. He went on to command the 11th Infantry Brigade in February 1942 and saw action in North Africa, Sicily and Italy. He then became commander of the 8th Infantry Brigade in October 1943 and, having been appointed a Commander of the Order of the British Empire on 23 March 1944, he went ashore with his brigade as part of the 3rd Infantry Division during the Normandy landings. After Major-General Tom Rennie was wounded in action, he briefly served as acting General Officer Commanding the 3rd Division from 13 to 23 June 1944. After that he became commander of 184th Infantry Brigade in February 1945 and then commander of 114th Infantry Brigade in June 1945. He left his command in August 1945 and retired in January 1949.

In retirement he became secretary of the National Rifle Association at the National Shooting Centre in Bisley.

== Bibliography ==
- Collins, James Lawton; Chandler, David G. (1994). The D-Day Encyclopedia. Simon & Schuster. ISBN 0132036215.
