= 8th Infantry Brigade (United Kingdom) =

- Insignia of 8th Infantry Brigade
- Active: 1914-1918; 1927-1934; 1939-1945; 1969-2006
- Country: United Kingdom
- Branch: British Army
- Type: Infantry
- Role: Infantry brigade
- Size: Brigade
- Part of: HQ Northern Ireland
- Garrison/HQ: Shackleton Barracks, Ballykelly
- Engagements: First World War; Second World War; The Troubles

Commanders
- Notable commanders: Brig. Frank Witts; Brig-Gen. Arthur Hoskins; Edward Cass

Insignia
- Abbreviation: 8th Inf Bde

The 8th Infantry Brigade was an infantry brigade of the British Army that saw active service in both the First and the Second World Wars, before being disbanded and reactivated in the 1960s. The brigade was finally being disbanded in 2006. It was formed before the First World War as part of the 3rd Division. As part of that division it spent the entire war on the Western Front from 1914 to 1918 in the First World War. The brigade was also active during the Second World War.

== First World War ==
The brigade, part of the 3rd Division, was serving in England on the outbreak of the First World War.

=== First World War Composition ===
- 2nd Battalion, Royal Scots
- 2nd Battalion, Royal Irish Regiment (left 24 October 1914)
- 4th Battalion, Middlesex Regiment (left 13 November 1915)
- 1st Battalion, Gordon Highlanders (left 12 September, returned 30 September 1914)
- 1st Battalion, Devonshire Regiment (from 4 until 30 September 1914)
- 2nd Battalion, Suffolk Regiment (from 25 October 1914, left 22 October 1915)
- 1/1st Battalion, Honourable Artillery Company (from 10 November until 9 December 1914)
- 1/4th Battalion, Gordon Highlanders (from 27 February, left 19 October 1915)
- 13th (Service) Battalion, King's Regiment (Liverpool) (from 23 October 1915, left 4 April 1916)
- 7th (Service) Battalion, King's Shropshire Light Infantry (from 19 October 1915)
- 1/5th Battalion, London Regiment (from 25 October 1915, left 10 February 1916)
- 8th (Service) Battalion, East Yorkshire Regiment (from 16 November 1915, disbanded 17 February 1918)
- 1st Battalion, Royal Scots Fusiliers (from 5 April 1916)
- 8th Machine Gun Company, Machine Gun Corps (formed 22 January 1916, moved to 3rd Battalion, Machine Gun Corps 6 March 1918)
- 8th Trench Mortar Battery (formed 18 April 1916)

=== Commanders ===
The commanders of the 8th Infantry Brigade during the First World War were:

- Brigadier-General B. J. C. Doran (At mobilization)
- Brigadier-General W. H. Bowes (23 October 1914)
- Brigadier-General A. R. Hoskins (25 March 1915)
- Brigadier-General J. D. McLachlan (3 October 1915)
- Brigadier-General E. G. Williams (13 March 1916)
- Brigadier-General G. Bull (3 December 1916)
- Brigadier-General H. G. Holmes (11 December 1916)

- Acting: Lieutenant-Colonel A. F. Lumsden (30 April 1917)

- Brigadier-General H. G. Holmes (15 May 1917)
- Brigadier-General W. E. C. Tanner (20 October 1917)
- Brigadier-General W. J. Webb-Bowen (2 April 1918)
- Brigadier-General L. A. E. Price-Davies (3 April 1918)
- Brigadier-General B. D. Fisher (12 April 1918)

== Second World War ==
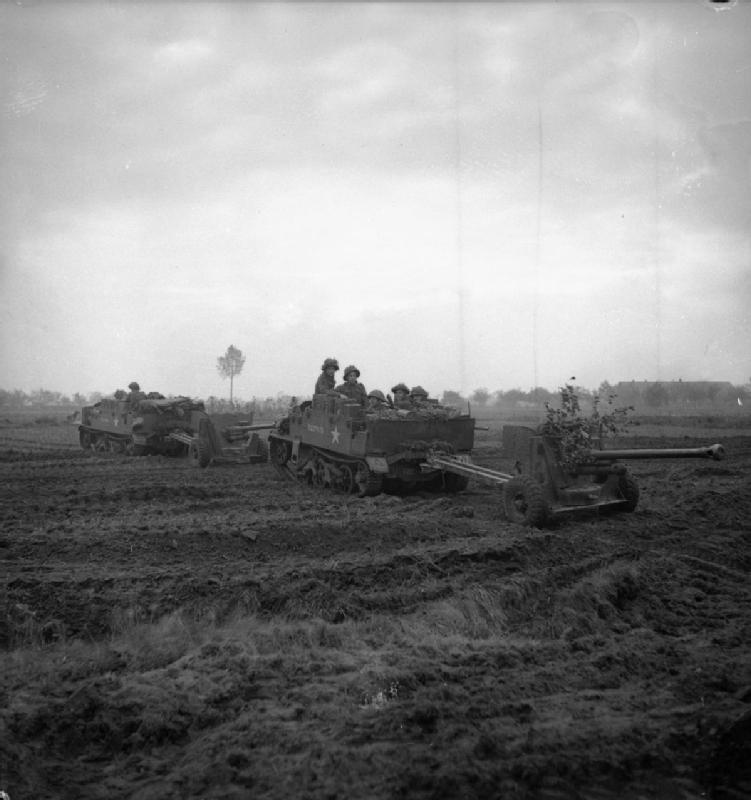
Universal Carriers and 6-pdr anti-tank guns of the 1st Battalion, South Lancashire Regiment during the advance on Venraij, 17 October 1944.

The brigade was in the United Kingdom upon the outbreak of the Second World War, when it was under the command of Brigadier Frank Witts.

=== Second World War Composition ===
The composition was:

- 1st Battalion, Suffolk Regiment
- 2nd Battalion, East Yorkshire Regiment
- 2nd Battalion, Gloucestershire Regiment (until 5 February 1940)
- 8th Infantry Brigade Anti-Tank Company (formed 3 September 1939, disbanded 1 January 1941)
- 4th Battalion, Royal Berkshire Regiment (from 5 February until 11 June 1940)
- 1st Battalion, South Lancashire Regiment (from 11 June 1940)

== Northern Ireland ==
Reactivated in the mid-late 1960s, the 8th Brigade was part of the 5th Division before arriving in Northern Ireland after the beginning of The Troubles, reporting to GOC Northern Ireland. It was based at Ebrington Barracks, Derry, and covered the north and northwest of the province. The Brigade Headquarters moved to Shackleton Barracks, Ballykelly, County Londonderry in October 2003. The brigade was disbanded and handed over responsibility to HQ 39th Infantry Brigade, based at Thiepval Barracks in Lisburn, on 1 September 2006.

During 1989, the 8th Infantry Brigade had the following structure:

- HQ 8th Infantry Brigade & 218th Signal Squadron, Royal Signals, Derry
  - 1st Btn, Gloucestershire Regiment, Ballykelly
  - 1st Btn, Royal Hampshire Regiment, Derry
  - 4th Btn, Ulster Defence Regiment
  - 5th Btn, Ulster Defence Regiment
  - 6th Btn, Ulster Defence Regiment
  - 8th Btn, Ulster Defence Regiment
