= Olly Brown =

Senior British Army officer

Major General Olly Brown CBE
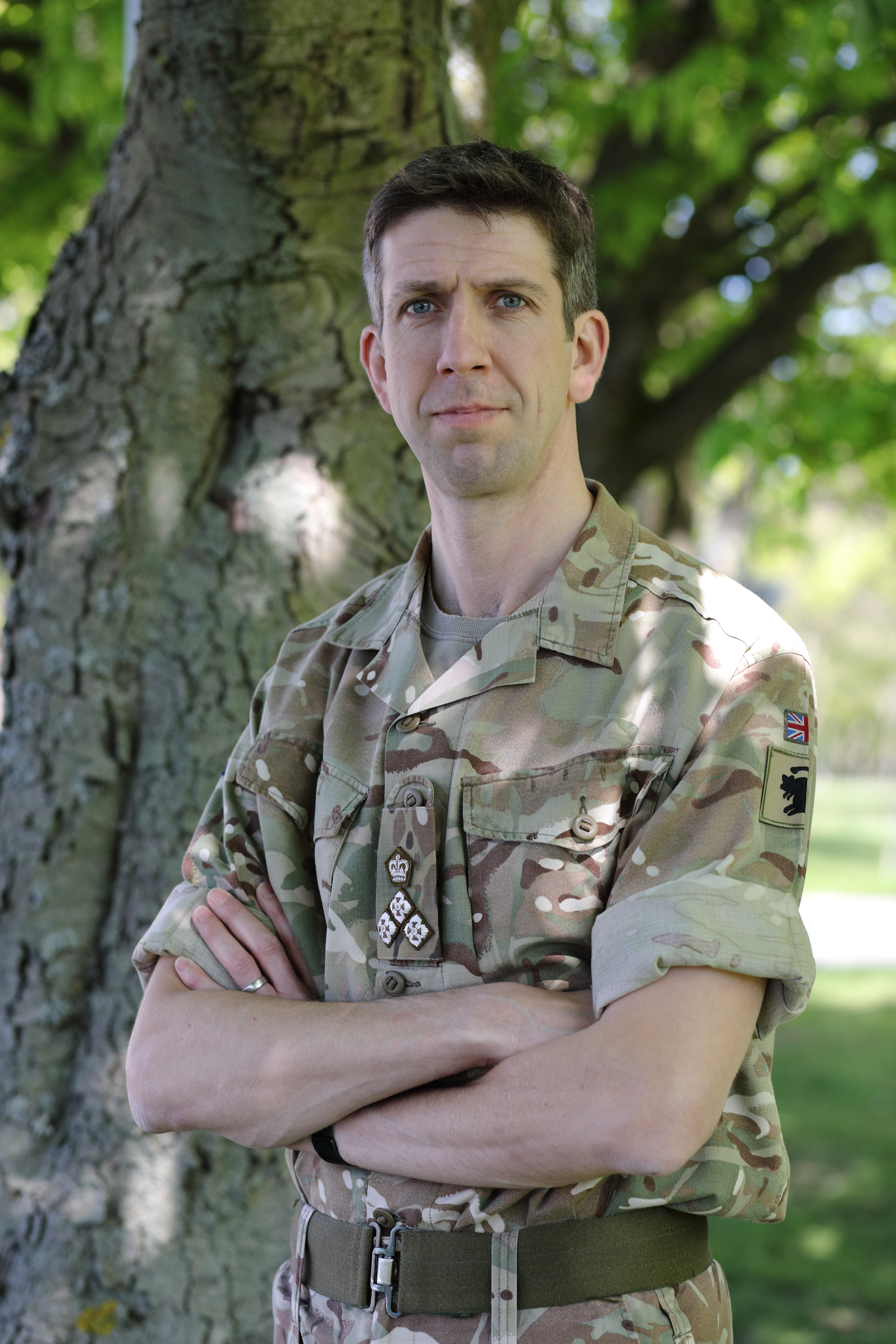
- Military career
- Branch: British Army
- Service years: 1997– Present
- Rank: Major General
- Conflicts: Iraq War; War in Afghanistan
- Awards: Commander of the Order of the British Empire

Major General Oliver Charles Christopher Brown CBE is a senior British Army officer. He served as General Officer Commanding 3rd (United Kingdom) Division from 2024 to 2026.

== Military career ==
Brown was commissioned into the Royal Anglian Regiment in 1997. He became commanding officer of the 2nd Battalion the Royal Anglian Regiment, in which role he was deployed to Nigeria for operations against Boko Haram, and went on to become commander of the 4th Infantry Brigade and Headquarters North East in May 2019, in which role he was deployed to Kabul as Commander British Forces Afghanistan. He then became Assistant Chief of Staff Operations within Headquarters Field Army in July 2021 and General Officer Commanding 3rd (United Kingdom) Division in July 2024.

Brown was appointed Commander of the Order of the British Empire (CBE) in the 2025 New Year Honours.

Military offices
Preceded by James Martin	GOC 3rd (United Kingdom) Division; 2024–2026	Succeeded by Henry Searby
