= George Bull (British Army officer) =

Brigadier-General George Bull DSO
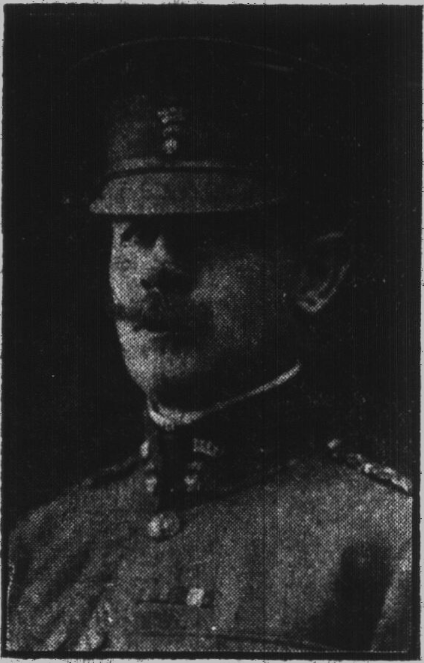
- Born: May 1877
- Died: 1 December 1916 (aged 39); France
- Military career
- Allegiance: United Kingdom
- Branch: British Army
- Rank: Brigadier-General
- Unit: Royal Irish Fusiliers
- Commands: 8th Infantry Brigade
- Conflicts: Second Boer War; First World War
- Awards: Distinguished Service Order; Mentioned in Despatches (4)

Brigadier-General George Bull, DSO (May 1877 – 11 December 1916) was a British Army officer. He was killed in France in 1916 whilst commanding the 8th Infantry Brigade.

On 17 November 1909 he was seconded from his regiment in order to serve as an adjutant of a Territorial Force (TF) unit.

He was promoted on 3 August 1912 to captain while seconded.
