= William Ramsden (British Army officer) =

Senior British army officer

Major-General William Ramsden CB CBE DSO MC
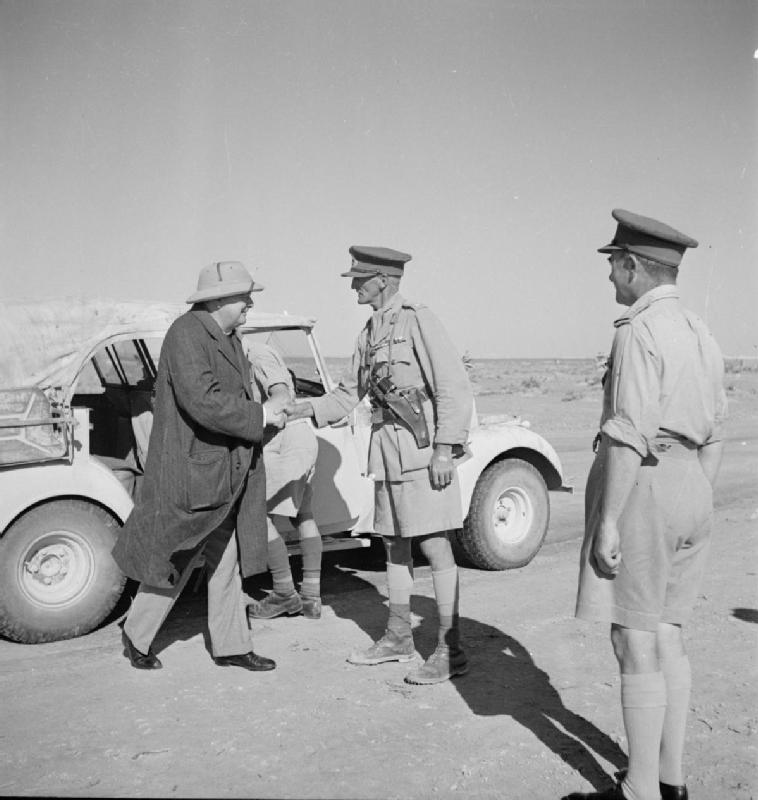
- Prime Minister Winston Churchill shaking hands with Ramsden in the El Alamein area, 7 August 1942
- Born: 3 October 1888; Chester, Cheshire, England
- Died: 16 December 1969 (aged 81); Aldershot, Hampshire, England
- Military career
- Allegiance: United Kingdom
- Branch: British Army
- Service years: 1910–1945
- Rank: Major-General
- Service number: 12629
- Units: West India Regiment; East Yorkshire Regiment; Hampshire Regiment
- Commands: British Troops in Sudan and Eritrea; 3rd Infantry Division; XXX Corps; 50th (Northumbrian) Infantry Division; 25th Infantry Brigade; West Lancashire Area; 1st Battalion, Hampshire Regiment
- Conflicts: First World War; Arab revolt in Palestine; Second World War
- Awards: Companion of the Order of the Bath; Commander of the Order of the British Empire; Distinguished Service Order; Military Cross; Mentioned in Despatches

Major-General William Havelock Chaplin Ramsden, CB, CBE, DSO, MC (3 October 1888 – 16 December 1969) was a senior British Army officer, who is most notable for commanding the 50th (Northumbrian) Infantry Division during the Second World War.

== Early life and First World War ==
Born in Chester, Cheshire, England, on 3 October 1888, the son of Reverend Henry Plumptre Ramsden and Ethel Frances Alice Havelock, William Ramsden was educated at Bath College and the Royal Military College, Sandhurst, where he was commissioned as a second lieutenant into the West India Regiment on 5 October 1910. Promoted to lieutenant on 2 October 1912, Ramsden served in the First World War with the 2nd Battalion of his regiment, initially in the Cameroons and in Nigeria with his regiment and then, from 19 March 1916, as a captain in the East Yorkshire Regiment. He served with the regiment on the Western Front, in France and Belgium, where he was awarded the Military Cross (MC) while attached to the 35th Battalion of the Machine Gun Corps (MGC), and was promoted to the temporary rank of major on 16 February 1918. On 22 January 1918 he married Christine Adelaide Baldwin, daughter of James Yescombe Baldwin.

== Between the wars ==
Between the wars Ramsden remained in the British Army, reaching the rank of lieutenant colonel by 1933, and securing command of the 1st Battalion, Hampshire Regiment in 1936. He was on active service on operations in Waziristan and Palestine during this period and was mentioned in despatches. He went on to be Commander of the West Lancashire Area in 1939.

== Second World War ==
Ramsden fought in the Second World War, commanding the 25th Infantry Brigade during the fighting in France in May 1940 as part of the British Expeditionary Force (BEF). Mentioned in despatches for his services, on 12 December 1940 he was promoted to the acting rank of major general and was appointed General Officer Commanding (GOC) of the 50th (Northumbrian) Infantry Division in succession to Giffard Martel. The division, which left England in mid-1941, fought well in North Africa the following year. Ramsden, "a lean Yorkshireman, steady and forceful, who always wore a huge automatic taken from a German officer in the previous war", was promoted to command XXX Corps in July 1942, which post he held until September 1942.

Returning to England after being succeeded by Oliver Leese as GOC XXX Corps, he was given Bernard Montgomery's old command, the 3rd Infantry Division, in December 1942, holding this post until December 1943 when succeeded by Tom Rennie. From early 1944 he was dispatched to the Sudan and became Commandant, Sudan Defence Force, later commanding British Troops in Sudan and Eritrea. He retired from the army in 1945.

== Bibliography ==
- Barnett, Correlli (1999). The Desert Generals. Cassell, 1999. ISBN 0-304-35280-2.
- Blaxland, Gregory (1977). The Plain Cook and the Great Showman: The First and Eighth Armies in North Africa. Kimber. ISBN 0-7183-0185-4.
- Callahan, Raymond (2007). Churchill and His Generals. University Press of Kansas, 2007. ISBN 978-070061512-4.
- Converse, Alan (2011). Armies of Empire: The 9th Australian and 50th British Divisions in Battle 1939–1945. Cambridge University Press. ISBN 978-0521194808.
- Smart, Nick (2005). Biographical Dictionary of British Generals of the Second World War. Barnsley: Pen and Sword Books. ISBN 1844150496.

Military offices
| Preceded by Giffard Martel | GOC 50th (Northumbrian) Infantry Division; 1940–1942 | Succeeded by John Nichols |
| Preceded by Willoughby Norrie | GOC XXX Corps; July–September 1942 | Succeeded by Sir Oliver Leese |
| Preceded by Eric Hayes | GOC 3rd Infantry Division; 1942–1943 | Succeeded by Tom Rennie |
| Preceded by Balfour Hutchison | Commandant of the Sudan Defence Force; 1944–1945 | Succeeded by William Stamer |
