= Frank Witts =

British Army officer

Brigadier Frank Witts DSO MC
- Born: 22 February 1887; Upper Slaughter, England
- Died: 9 May 1941 (aged 54); Glasgow, Scotland
- Relatives: Frederick Witts (brother)
- Military career
- Allegiance: United Kingdom
- Branch: British Army
- Service years: 1914–1941
- Rank: Brigadier
- Service number: 9376
- Units: Irish Guards; King's Own Royal Regiment (Lancaster)
- Commands: 1st Battalion, King's Own Royal Regiment (Lancaster); 8th Infantry Brigade
- Conflicts: First World War; Second World War
- Awards: Companion of the Distinguished Service Order and Bar; Military Cross; Mentioned in Dispatches

Brigadier Frank Hole Witts DSO MC (22 February 1887 – 9 May 1941) was a British Army officer.

== Military career ==
Witts was born in Upper Slaughter, Gloucestershire, the son of Rev. Canon Francis Edward Broome Witts and Margaret Bourne. He was educated at Radley College and Trinity College, Oxford, graduating in 1906. In August 1914 he received a temporary commission in the Irish Guards and served in France throughout the First World War. He had a distinguished record, being Mentioned in Dispatches three times, wounded three times, and receiving the Military Cross on 1 November 1917. He was given a permanent commission in the Irish Guards in 1916 and ended the war as a captain. On 2 June 1919 he was made a Companion of the Distinguished Service Order.

Between 1919 and 1926 Witts was posted in Portsmouth and London as a staff officer. Between 1926 and 1929 he was Deputy Assistant Adjutant & Quartermaster-General, London District. From 1930 to 1933 he was Chief Instructor at the Royal Military College, Sandhurst, before becoming Commanding Officer, 1st Battalion, King's Own Royal Regiment (Lancaster) until 1935. Witts then served as Assistant Quartermaster-General, HQ Aldershot Command. From 1937 to 1940 he commanded the 8th Infantry Brigade, leading the brigade during its operations in the Battle of France. From 1940 until his premature death he served as Area Commander, Glasgow Area.

Witts had been an Aide-de-Camp to George VI from 1939. He married Ruth Leonide Brocklebank in 1919.
