= James Martin (British Army officer) =

British Army officer (born 1973)

Major General James Martin DSO OBE MC
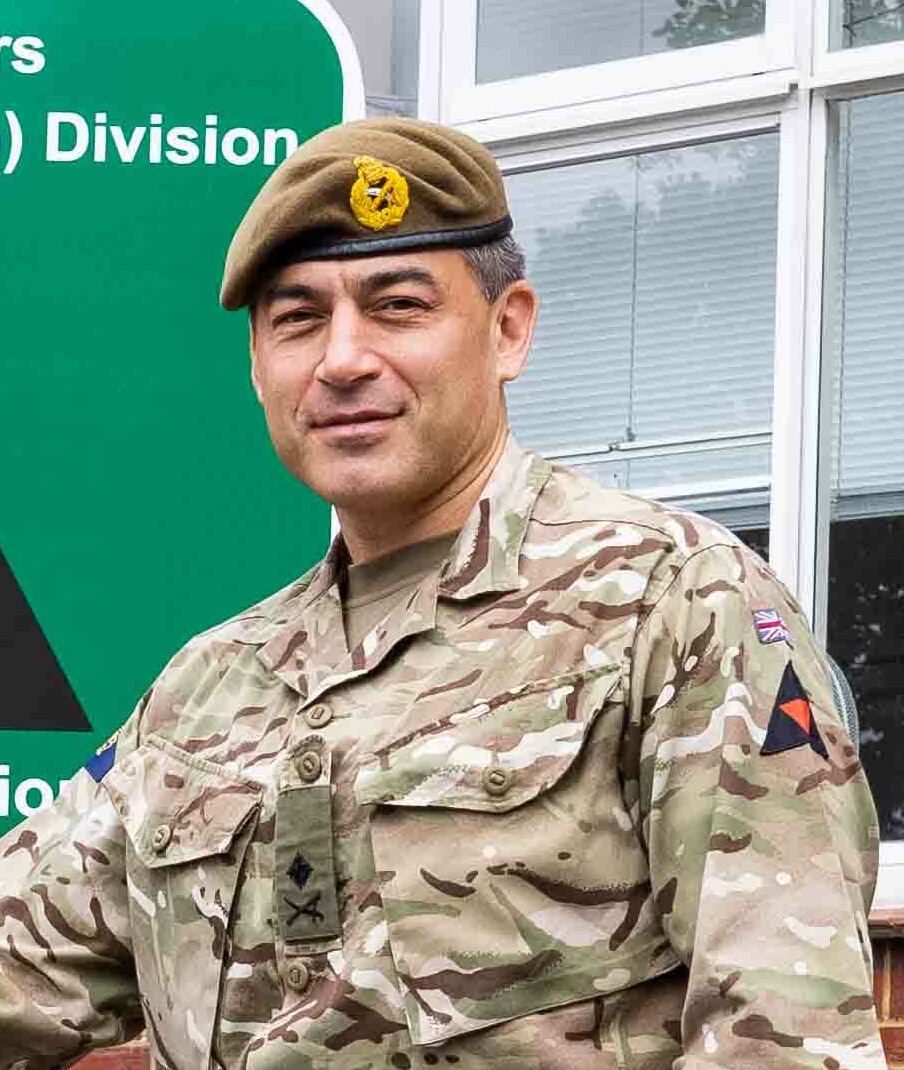
- Major General Martin in 2022
- Born: 1973 (age 52–53)
- Military career
- Allegiance: United Kingdom
- Branch: British Army
- Service years: 1993–present
- Rank: Major General
- Unit: Princess of Wales's Royal Regiment
- Commands: 3rd (United Kingdom) Division; 16 Air Assault Brigade; 1st Armoured Infantry Brigade
- Conflicts: The Troubles; Iraq War; War in Afghanistan
- Awards: Distinguished Service Order; Officer of the Order of the British Empire; Military Cross

Major General James Rowland Martin, DSO, OBE, MC (born 1973) is a senior British Army officer, who served as General Officer Commanding the 3rd (United Kingdom) Division from 2021 to 2024.

== Military career ==
After graduating from the Royal Military Academy Sandhurst, Martin was commissioned into the Princess of Wales's Royal Regiment with effect from 7 August 1993. He became commander of the 1st Armoured Infantry Brigade in November 2018, commander of 16 Air Assault Brigade in July 2020, and General Officer Commanding 3rd (United Kingdom) Division in October 2021.

Awarded the Military Cross "for gallant and distinguished service in Afghanistan" on 25 March 2011, Martin was appointed a Companion of the Distinguished Service Order "for distinguished services in Afghanistan" on 26 February 2015, and an Officer of the Order of the British Empire "for gallant and distinguished services in the field" on 21 April 2017.

Military offices
Preceded by Michael Elviss	GOC 3rd (United Kingdom) Division; 2021–2024	Succeeded by Oliver Brown
