= 1st Armoured Infantry Brigade =

Inactive British Army formation

1st (Guards) Brigade 1st Brigade 1st Infantry Brigade (Guards) 1st Infantry Brigade 1st Mechanized Brigade 1st Armoured Infantry Brigade
- Insignia of the 1st Armoured Infantry Brigade.
- Active: 1899–2022
- Country: United Kingdom
- Branch: British Army
- Type: Armoured Infantry, Mechanized Infantry, Light Infantry
- Size: Brigade
- Part of: 3rd (United Kingdom) Division
- Garrison/HQ: Delhi Barracks, Tidworth Camp
- Engagements: First World War; Battle of Mons; First Battle of the Marne; First Battle of the Aisne; First Battle of Ypres; Battle of Aubers Ridge; Battle of Loos; Battle of the Somme (1916); Battle of Pozières; Third Battle of Ypres; Battle of Épehy; Second World War; Battle of France; Fondouk; El Kourzia; Tunis; Battle of Monte Cassino; Liri Valley

The 1st Armoured Infantry Brigade was an infantry brigade of the British Army with a long history including service during both the First and the Second World Wars. It was based at Tidworth Camp. Previously, it has been designated 1st (Guards) Brigade, 1st Infantry Brigade, 1st Mechanised Brigade (from the 1990s) and, under the initial Army 2020 reforms, assumed the title of 1st Armoured Infantry Brigade. Under the Future Soldier programme, the brigade was merged with the 1st Artillery Brigade to form the 1st Deep Recce Strike Brigade Combat Team.

== History ==
Following the end of the Second Boer War in 1902, the army was restructured and the 1st Guards Brigade was established permanently as part of the 1st Division in the 1st Army Corps, stationed at Aldershot Garrison.

=== First World War ===
Initially designated as the 1st (Guards) Brigade, the brigade was part of 1st Division during the First World War. Upon creation of the Guards Division in August 1915, the 1st Battalion, Coldstream Guards and 1st Battalion, Scots Guards moved to 2nd Guards Brigade, and the brigade was redesignated as the 1st Brigade. It was with the 1st Division on the Western Front throughout the war. It saw action at the Battle of Mons and subsequent Great Retreat, the First Battle of the Marne, the First Battle of the Aisne, the First Battle of Ypres, the Battle of Loos, the Battle of Aubers Ridge, the Battle of the Somme, the Battle of Passchendaele, the Battle of Pozières and the Battle of Épehy, part of the final Hundred Days Offensive, which broke the back of the German Army, leading to an Armistice.

==== Order of battle ====
The brigade was composed as follows during the war:

- 1st Battalion, Coldstream Guards (until August 1915)
- 1st Battalion, Scots Guards (until August 1915)
- 1st Battalion, Black Watch (Royal Highland Regiment)
- 2nd Battalion, Royal Munster Fusiliers (until August 1914)
- 1st Battalion, Queen's Own Cameron Highlanders (from September 1914)
- 1/14th Battalion, London Regiment (from November 1914, left February 1916)
- 10th (Service) Battalion, Gloucestershire Regiment (from August 1915, disbanded February 1918)
- 8th (Service) Battalion, Royal Berkshire Regiment (from August 1915, left February 1918)
- 1st Machine Gun Company, Machine Gun Corps (formed 26 January 1916, moved to 1st Battalion, Machine Gun Corps 28 February 1918)
- 1st Trench Mortar Battery (formed 27 November 1915)
- 1st Battalion, Loyal Regiment (North Lancashire) (from February 1918)

=== Second World War ===
Remaining active during the interwar period as the 1st (Guards) Brigade, the brigade, still part of the 1st Infantry Division, was sent to France in September 1939 during the Second World War as part of the British Expeditionary Force (BEF) and it later took part in the Battle of France in May–June 1940 and the subsequent Battle of Dunkirk and were evacuated to England, spending the next few years on home defence anticipating a German invasion of England.

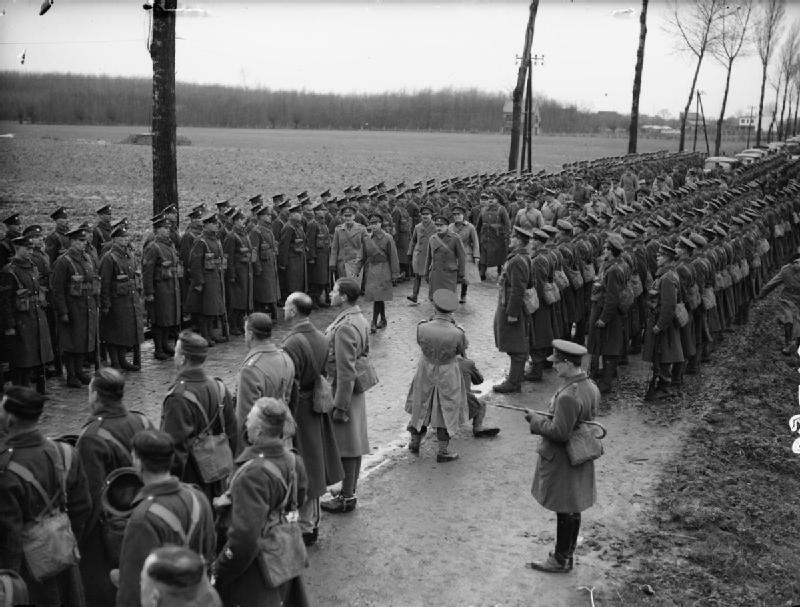
HM The King reviews the 2nd Battalion, Coldstream Guards at Bachy, France, December 1939.

On 11 April 1942, the brigade was redesignated and reorganised as 1st Independent Brigade Group (Guards), with its own support units, until August when it was transferred to the 78th Infantry Division. In late 1942, it took part in the North African Campaign in Operation Torch: the Allied landings in French North Africa, arriving in Algiers in November 1942.

The brigade participated in the Run for Tunis and was transferred to the 6th Armoured Division in early 1943 and saw action in the Tunisia Campaign at the Battle of Fondouk, Battle of El Kourzia and Battle of Tunis in April and May 1943. Subsequently, the 1st (Guards) Brigade served on the Italian Front for the rest of the war under command of various divisions, seeing action in the Battle of Monte Cassino (where the brigade played a holding "hinge" role during Operation Diadem) and the Battle of Liri Valley in May 1944. The brigade then fought on the Gothic Line and in the Spring 1945 offensive in Italy.

==== Order of battle ====
The 1st (Guards) Brigade was constituted as follows during the war:

- 3rd Battalion, Grenadier Guards
- 2nd Battalion, Coldstream Guards
- 2nd Battalion, Hampshire Regiment (until 1 June 1941, rejoined 10 September 1941 until 25 November 1942, rejoined 18 February 1943, left finally 22 February 1943)
- 1st Infantry Brigade Anti-Tank Company (disbanded 31 December 1940)
- 8th Battalion, Argyll and Sutherland Highlanders (from 25 December 1942 until 16 February 1943)
- 3rd Battalion, Welsh Guards (from 1 March 1943)
- 1st Battalion, Welch Regiment (from 9 March 1945 until 29 June 1945)

Between 11 April 1942 and 7 August 1942, the following units formed the 1st Independent Brigade Group (Guards):

- 8th Battalion, Argyll and Sutherland Highlanders
- 1st Independent Brigade Group Machine Gun Company, 1st Battalion, Royal Northumberland Fusiliers
- 1st Independent Brigade Group Reconnaissance Company, Reconnaissance Corps
- 17th Field Regiment, Royal Artillery
- 204th (Oban) Anti-tank Battery, Royal Artillery (from 11 April to 7 August 1942)
- 136th Light Anti-Aircraft Battery, Royal Artillery
- 214th Field Company, Royal Engineers
- 1st Independent Brigade Group Company, Royal Army Service Corps
- 152nd Field Ambulance, Royal Army Medical Corps
- 1st Independent Brigade Group Ordnance Company, Royal Army Ordnance Corps

=== Cold War ===
After the War, the brigade, having lost its 'Guards' title, was transferred to Palestine for internal security duties and then to Egypt for a few months before going back to Palestine in April 1946. Two years later, as the British mandate over Palestine ended, the brigade and division returned to Egypt. In October 1951, British forces pulled out of Egypt outside of the Suez Canal Zone, and later the brigade returned to the United Kingdom, though it was in Cyprus during the EOKA insurgency for a period in 1957–8. In 1968, the dispatch of the entire 3rd Infantry Division began to be planned, as part of the United Kingdom Mobile Force, to reinforce Allied Land Forces Schleswig-Holstein and Jutland (LANDJUT). By the mid-1980s, the British Army force earmarked as part of the UKMF to reinforce LANDJUT had shrunk to the 1st Infantry Brigade, as it had become.

In 1991, just before the end of the Cold War, the brigade's structure was as follows.

1st (United Kingdom Mobile Force) Infantry Brigade, at Jellalabad Barracks, Tidworth Camp

- Headquarters 1st Infantry Brigade and 215 Signal Squadron, Royal Corps of Signals, at Jellalabad Barracks, Tidworth Camp
  - United Kingdom Mobile Force Battle Casualty Replacements Group
  - 601 Tactical Air Control Post (Forward Air Control)
  - 602 Tactical Air Control Post (Forward Air Control)
  - 610 Tactical Air Control Post (Forward Air Control) — RAF personnel
- 13th/18th (Queen Mary's Own) Royal Hussars, at Assaye Barracks, Tidworth Camp (Armoured Reconnaissance, 1 Sqn detached to AMF (L))
- C Squadron, Royal Hussars (Prince of Wales's Own), at Bhurtpore Barracks, Tidworth Camp (Armoured)
- 1st Battalion, Queen's Regiment, at Mooltan Barracks, Tidworth Camp (Mechanised)
- 1st Battalion, Devonshire and Dorset Regiment, at Kiwi Barracks, Bulford (Mechanised)
- 1st Battalion, The Light Infantry, at Lucknow Barracks, Tidworth (Mechanised)
- 26th Field Regiment, Royal Artillery, at Baker Barracks, Thorney Island (Field Artillery)
- 22nd Engineer Regiment, Royal Engineers, at Swinton Barracks, Perham Down
- 66 Transport Squadron, Royal Corps of Transport, at Jellalabad Barracks, Tidworth
- 158 Provost Company, Royal Military Police, at Bulford Camp
- No. 656 Squadron, Army Air Corps, at AAC Netheravon

=== End of the Cold War ===
After the end of the Cold War, the brigade was reassigned to the new 3rd (UK) Division and subsequently became a Mechanised Brigade. In 1996, it was deployed to the Former Republic of Yugoslavia, with Multi-National Division (South-West); in 2000, it was deployed to Sierra Leone and, in 2002, to Kosovo.

The brigade was deployed to Afghanistan as part of Operation Herrick XVIII. It was deployed again in 2014, commanded by Brigadier Rupert Jones.

==== Army 2020 ====
Under Army 2020, it was renamed the 1st Armoured Infantry Brigade and remained at Tidworth Camp, forming part of the Reaction Force as part of the 3rd (UK) Division. Under the programme, the Brigade consisted of the following units:

- 1st Armoured Infantry Brigade, at Delhi Barracks, Tidworth Garrison.
  - Household Cavalry Regiment, at Ward Barracks, Bulford Garrison (Armoured Cavalry, equipped with FV107 Scimitar tracked armoured reconnaissance vehicles)
  - The Royal Tank Regiment, at Tidworth Garrison
  - 1st Battalion, Royal Regiment of Fusiliers, at Tidworth Garrison (Armoured Infantry, equipped with Warrior IFV)
  - 1st Battalion, Mercian Regiment, at Tidworth Garrison (Armoured Infantry, equipped with Warrior IFV)
  - 4th Battalion, The Rifles, at Aldershot (Mechanised Infantry, equipped with Mastiff protected mobility vehicles)

==== Army 2020 Refine ====
Under the Army 2020 Refine programme, the 1st Armoured Infantry Brigade was due to form up as the first of two Strike Brigades by 2021. The Brigade then consisted of the following units:

- 1st Armoured Infantry Brigade, at Delhi Barracks, Tidworth Garrison (to become 1st Strike Brigade in 2021).
  - Strike Experimentation Group, at Battlesbury Barracks, Warminster Garrison (a developmental command, overseen by HQ 1st AI Bde)
  - Household Cavalry Regiment (HCR), at Ward Barracks, Bulford Garrison (Armoured Cavalry, equipped with FV107 Scimitar tracked armoured reconnaissance vehicles)
  - Royal Lancers (Queen Elizabeth's Own) (RL), at Cambrai Barracks, Catterick Garrison (Armoured Cavalry, equipped with FV107 Scimitar armoured reconnaissance vehicles)
  - 1st Battalion, Scots Guards (1 SG), at Mons Barracks, Aldershot Garrison (Mechanised Infantry, equipped with Mastiff protected mobility vehicles)
  - The Highlanders, 4th Battalion the Royal Regiment of Scotland (4 SCOTS), at Bourlon Barracks, Catterick (Mechanised Infantry, equipped with Mastiff protected mobility vehicles)
  - 3rd Battalion, The Rifles (3 RIFLES), at Dreghorn Barracks, Edinburgh (Mechanised Infantry, equipped with Mastiff protected mobility vehicles)

=== Future Soldier ===
On 1 July, under the Future Soldier programme, the brigade merged with 1st Artillery Brigade to form 1st Deep Recce Strike Brigade Combat Team.

Jane's reported that the brigade was disbanded in early July 2022. The Household Cavalry and Royal Lancers were transferred to the 1st Deep Reconnaissance Strike Brigade, and three of the brigade's infantry battalions and the small support subunits were reassigned "to other brigades".

== Brigade commanders ==
The following officers have commanded the brigade:

=== First World War ===
- Brigadier-General F. I. Maxse (At mobilization)
- Brigadier-General C. Fitzclarence (26 September 1914)
- Colonel D. L. MacEwen (12 November 1914 - acting)
- Brigadier-General H. C. Lowther (23 November 1914)
- Brigadier-General A. J. Reddie (23 August 1915)
- Brigadier-General J. R. M. Minshull-Ford (18 October 1917)
- Brigadier-General C. J. C. Grant (21 October 1917)
- Lieutenant-Colonel Sir T. W. H. J. Erskine, Bt. (29 March 1918 - acting)
- Brigadier-General W. B. Thornton (3 April 1918)
- Brigadier-General L. L. Wheatley (22 September 1918)

=== Second World War ===
- Brigadier Merton Beckwith-Smith (until 31 May 1940, again from 3 June 1940 until 14 July 1940)
- Lieutenant Colonel L. Bootle-Wilbraham (acting, from 31 May 1940 until 3 June 1940)
- Brigadier F.A.V. Copland-Griffiths (from 14 July 1940 until 14 April 1943)
- Brigadier S.A. Forster (from 14 April 1943 until 24 July 1943)
- Brigadier Philip Gregson-Ellis (from 24 July 1943 until 18 January 1944)
- Lieutenant Colonel A.G.W. Heber-Percy (acting, from 18 January 1944 until 3 February 1944)
- Brigadier J.C. Haydon (from 3 February 1944 until 29 July 1944)
- Brigadier C.A.M.D. Scott (from 29 July 1944 until 21 January 1945, again from 13 February 1945 until 11 March 1945)
- Lieutenant Colonel E.J.B. Nelson (acting, from 21 January 1945 until 13 February 1945)
- Brigadier Gerald Lloyd-Verney (from 11 March 1945)

=== Post-war ===
- Brigadier Rodney Moore 1946–1947
- Brigadier George Johnson 1947–1949
- Brigadier George Gordon-Lennox 1952–1954
- Brigadier John McColl 1997–1999
- Brigadier Jonathon Riley 1999–2000
- Brigadier Simon Mayall 2001–2002
- Brigadier Rupert Jones 2012–2014
- Brigadier William Wright 2014–2016
- Brigadier Zachary Stenning 2016–2018
- Brigadier James Martin 2018–2020
- Brigadier Samuel L. Humphris MBE 2020–2022 (Final Commander before the Brigade's disbandment, see 3rd Deep Reconnaissance Strike Brigade)

== Sources ==
- Joslen, Lt-Col H.F. (2003) [1960]. Orders of Battle: Second World War, 1939–1945. Uckfield: Naval and Military Press. ISBN 978-1-84342-474-1.
