= Henry Searby =

Senior British Army officer

Major General Henry Searby OBE
- Military career
- Branch: British Army
- Service years: 1997– Present
- Rank: Major General
- Conflicts: War in Afghanistan
- Awards: Officer of the Order of the British Empire

Major General Henry Lister Searby OBE is a senior British Army officer. He currently serves as General Officer Commanding 3rd (United Kingdom) Division.

== Military career ==
Searby was commissioned into the 9th/12th Royal Lancers on 9 August 1997. He was appointed an Officer of the Order of the British Empire for his service in Afghanistan in March 2012. He became commanding officer of the Royal Lancers in February 2017 and, after promotion to brigadier in July 2023, became commander of 12th Armoured Brigade Combat Team. After a tour as Assistant Chief of Staff (plans and policy), he became General Officer Commanding 3rd (United Kingdom) Division in September 2026.

Military offices
| Preceded by Olly Brown | GOC 3rd (United Kingdom) Division; 2026–present | Incumbent |
