= Patrick Delaforce =

British Army captain (1923–2018)

- Born: 28 November 1923; Reigate, Surrey, England
- Died: 22 January 2018 (aged 94); Brighton, West Sussex, England
- Spouse(s): Dinah Clodd (m. 1949, divorced) Gillian Kitching (m. 1960–2015)
- Children: 4
- Military career
- Allegiance: United Kingdom
- Branch: British Army
- Service years: 1942–1947
- Rank: Captain
- Service number: 304456
- Unit: Suffolk Yeomanry
- Conflicts: Second World War
- Awards: Bronze Cross of the Netherlands; Chevalier de Legion d'Honneur; Mentioned in dispatches (2)

Patrick de Fleurriet Delaforce (28 November 1923 – 22 January 2018) was a British Army officer and military historian. He fought in the European theatre of World War II, attaining the rank of captain before retiring from the army in 1947, and starting his career as a historian around 1979.

== Early life ==
Patrick Delaforce was born in Reigate, Surrey, on 28 November 1923. His father was a soldier in World War I, who also served with the Supreme Headquarters Allied Expeditionary Force during World War II. Delaforce traced his family origins to Gascony, and Huguenots who fled to Britain. His great grandfather founded a port wine business in Porto, Portugal, in 1868.

Delaforce attended Winchester College, and spent a year finishing his education at Queen's University Belfast before enlisting in the British Army in 1942.

== Military career ==
Delaforce attended an Officer Cadet Training Unit in Catterick, North Yorkshire, and was commissioned into the Suffolk Yeomanry.

Delaforce served as an artillery officer in the 13th Regiment, Royal Horse Artillery (Honourable Artillery Company), part of the 11th Armoured Division, during World War II. He participated in Operation Overlord, Operation Market Garden, and the Liberation of Belgium from 1944 to 1945. In the Netherlands, he became a forward observation officer, and was injured, having his ribs and one arm broken, and his leg paralysed when his Universal Carrier was hit by an anti-tank mine. He rejoined his unit once he recovered in November 1944, and received his first of two mentions in dispatches for successfully deterring a German Tiger tank during battle along the river Elbe with only a Sten when his unit's anti-tank guns had all been destroyed. During the battle, he was hit by a grenade, his second injury of the war. His second mention in dispatches came at a later date, when he directed artillery fire while in close proximity to the enemy.

In 1945, Delaforce participated in the liberation of Breendonck concentration camp, and was one of the first soldiers to liberate Bergen-Belsen concentration camp. The same year, he was awarded the Bronze Cross of the Netherlands. In 2015, he was awarded the Chevalier de Legion d'Honneur.

After the war, Delaforce was an intelligence officer in Schleswig-Holstein until his resignation from the army in 1947.

== Later career ==
After leaving the army, Delaforce became a sales manager in his family's port wine business. In 1958, he joined Intam Limited, a subsidiary of the London Press Exchange, and by 1961, he was vice president and general manager of Otto-Intam, a New York-based advertising agency.

In 1962, he bought a vineyard and farmhouse, where he produced wine and truffles, though claiming himself that the wine produced there was "terrible". He retired from winemaking in 1979, and went on to become a historian, writing a total of 47 books on subjects such as the wives of Samuel Pepys, the Duke of Wellington, and Horatio Nelson, and also writing about the units and campaigns of World War II, including his own, with The Black Bull.

== Personal life ==
Delaforce married Dinah Clodd in 1949, and after their marriage dissolved, he married Gillian Kitching in 1960. They remained together until Gillian's death in 2015. Delaforce died on 22 January 2018 and was buried with Gillian in Woodvale Cemetery, Brighton. He had a son and daughter with his first wife, William and Joanna, and two daughters with his second, Amanda and Charlotte.
