= Tom Rennie =

British Army general

Major-General Tom Rennie CB DSO MC
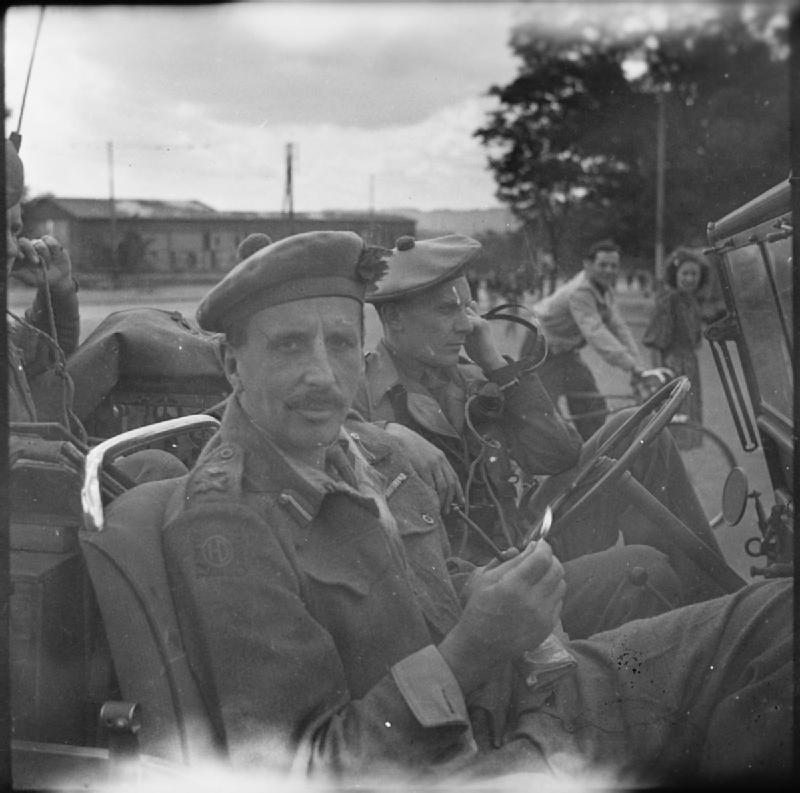
- Born: 3 January 1900; Foochow, China
- Died: 24 March 1945 (aged 45); River Rhine, Germany
- Burial place: Reichswald Forest War Cemetery, Germany
- Military career
- Allegiance: United Kingdom
- Branch: British Army
- Service years: 1919–1945
- Rank: Major-General
- Service number: 18139
- Unit: Black Watch
- Commands: 51st (Highland) Infantry Division (1944–45); 3rd Infantry Division (1943–44); 154th Infantry Brigade (1943); 5th Battalion, Black Watch (1941–42)
- Conflicts: Second World War; French and Low Countries campaign; Battle of France (POW); North African campaign; Western Desert campaign; Second Battle of El Alamein; Italian campaign; Allied invasion of Sicily; Western Allied invasion of France; Normandy landings; Western Allied invasion of Germany; Operation Plunder †
- Awards: Companion of the Order of the Bath; Distinguished Service Order; Member of the Order of the British Empire

Major-General Thomas Gordon Rennie, CB, DSO, MBE (3 January 1900 – 24 March 1945) was a British Army officer who served with distinction during the Second World War. He was the General Officer Commanding (GOC) of the 3rd Infantry Division during the Normandy landings in June 1944. He was injured on 13 June but recovered quickly and was given command of the 51st (Highland) Infantry Division, which he led for the rest of the campaign in Western Europe until he was killed in action during Operation Plunder, the Allied crossing of the River Rhine, in March 1945.

== Military career ==
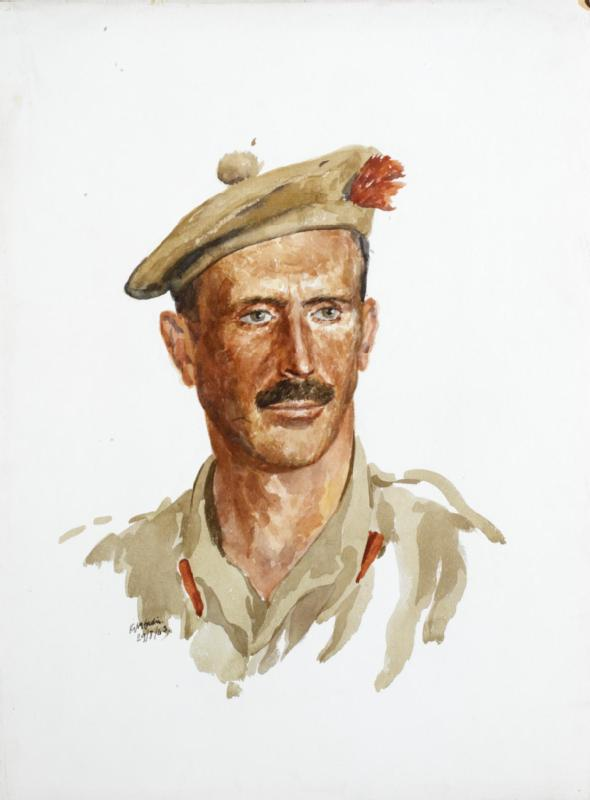
A head and shoulder portrait of Brigadier T. G. Rennie in uniform.

Educated at Loretto School and the Royal Military College, Sandhurst, Rennie was commissioned as a second lieutenant into the Black Watch (Royal Highland Regiment) on 16 July 1919. After attending the Staff College, Camberley, from 1933 to 1934, he saw active service in the Second World War, was taken prisoner at Saint-Valery-en-Caux during the final stages of the Battle of France in June 1940, but then escaped nine days later.

Rennie was made commanding officer of the 5th Battalion, Black Watch (Royal Highland Regiment) in 1942, leading the battalion at the Second Battle of El Alamein in October 1942, and then becoming commander of the 154th Infantry Brigade and leading that formation for the Allied invasion of Sicily in July 1943.

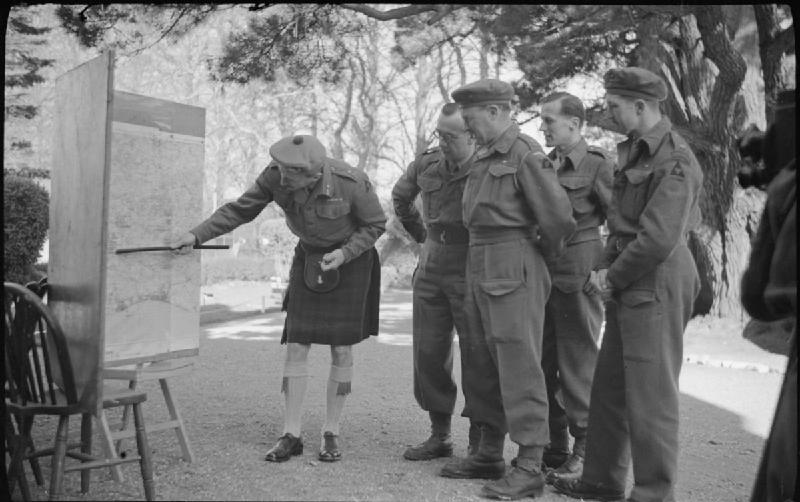
Major-General Thomas Rennie, GOC 3rd Division, studying a map with other officers at Divisional HQ during an exercise, 1 May 1944.

Towards the end of 1943 it was decided to withdraw the 51st Division, together with three other battle-experienced formations, back to Britain in order to strengthen the Anglo-Canadian 21st Army Group for the Allied invasion of Normandy, scheduled to take place in the spring of 1944. Rennie's brigade therefore arrived in England in late November. On 12 December Rennie was promoted to the acting rank of major-general and received a new appointment as the General Officer Commanding (GOC) of the 3rd Infantry Division. The 3rd Division was one of the original divisions of the Regular Army and had fought under Montgomery's command with the BEF in 1940. Since then it had not served overseas and had only seen service in the United Kingdom until being transferred in mid-1943 to the 21st Army Group, then commanded by General Sir Bernard Paget. As a result, by the time Rennie succeeded Major-General William Ramsden as GOC, he found the division, then training in combined operations in Scotland, to be extremely well trained but almost completely lacking in experience in battle. In April 1944 the division was sent to Southern England to begin its final preparations for the invasion of Normandy, where it was to be one of the assaulting formations for the initial stages of the invasion.

Rennie was then made General Officer Commanding 51st (Highland) Infantry Division but in March 1945, after crossing the Rhine, he was killed by mortar fire. He left behind a widow and two children. He is buried in Reichswald Forest War Cemetery.

== Bibliography ==
- James Lawton Collins Jr.; David G. Chandler (1994). The D-Day Encyclopedia. Simon & Schuster. ISBN 0132036215.
- Mead, Richard (2007). Churchill's Lions: a biographical guide to the key British generals of World War II. Stroud (UK): Spellmount. ISBN 978-1-86227-431-0.
- Smart, Nick (2005). Biographical Dictionary of British Generals of the Second World War. Barnesley: Pen & Sword. ISBN 1844150496.

Military offices
Preceded by William Ramsden	GOC 3rd Infantry Division; 1943–1944	Succeeded by Lashmer Whistler
Preceded by Charles Bullen-Smith	GOC 51st (Highland) Infantry Division; 1944–1945	Succeeded by Gordon MacMillan
