= 3rd (UK) Division =

Armoured division of the British Army

3rd Division; 3rd Infantry Division; 3rd Armoured Division; 3rd (United Kingdom) Mechanised Division; 3rd (United Kingdom) Division
- Divisional insignia since 1940
- Active: 18 June 1809 – present
- Country: United Kingdom
- Branch: British Army
- Type: Armoured Infantry
- Part of: Land Forces Command
- Garrison/HQ: Bulford Camp, Wiltshire
- Nicknames: 1810–1814: Fighting 3rd From 1916: The Iron Division, Ironsides, or Iron Sides
- Engagements: Napoleonic Wars; Crimean War; Second Boer War; First World War; Second World War; Palestine Emergency; Gulf War; Iraq War
- Website: www.army.mod.uk/learn-and-explore/about-the-army/formations-divisions-and-brigades/3rd-united-kingdom-division/

Commanders
- Current commander: Major General Henry Searby

Insignia
- c. First World War

The 3rd (United Kingdom) Division, also known as The Iron Division, is a regular army division of the British Army. It was created in 1809 by Arthur Wellesley, 1st Duke of Wellington, as part of the Anglo-Portuguese Army, for service in the Peninsular War, and was known as the Fighting 3rd under Sir Thomas Picton during the Napoleonic Wars. The division fought at the Battle of Waterloo, as well as during the Crimean War and the Second Boer War. As a result of bitter fighting in 1916, during the First World War, the division became referred to as the 3rd (Iron) Division, or the Iron Division or Ironsides. During the Second World War, the division (now known as the 3rd Infantry Division) fought in the Battle of France including a rearguard action during the Dunkirk Evacuation, and played a prominent role in the D-Day landings of 6 June 1944. The division was to have been part of a proposed Commonwealth Corps, formed for a planned invasion of Japan in 1945–46, and later served in the British Mandate of Palestine. During the Second World War, the insignia became the "pattern of three" — a black triangle trisected by an inverted red triangle.

== Napoleonic Wars ==
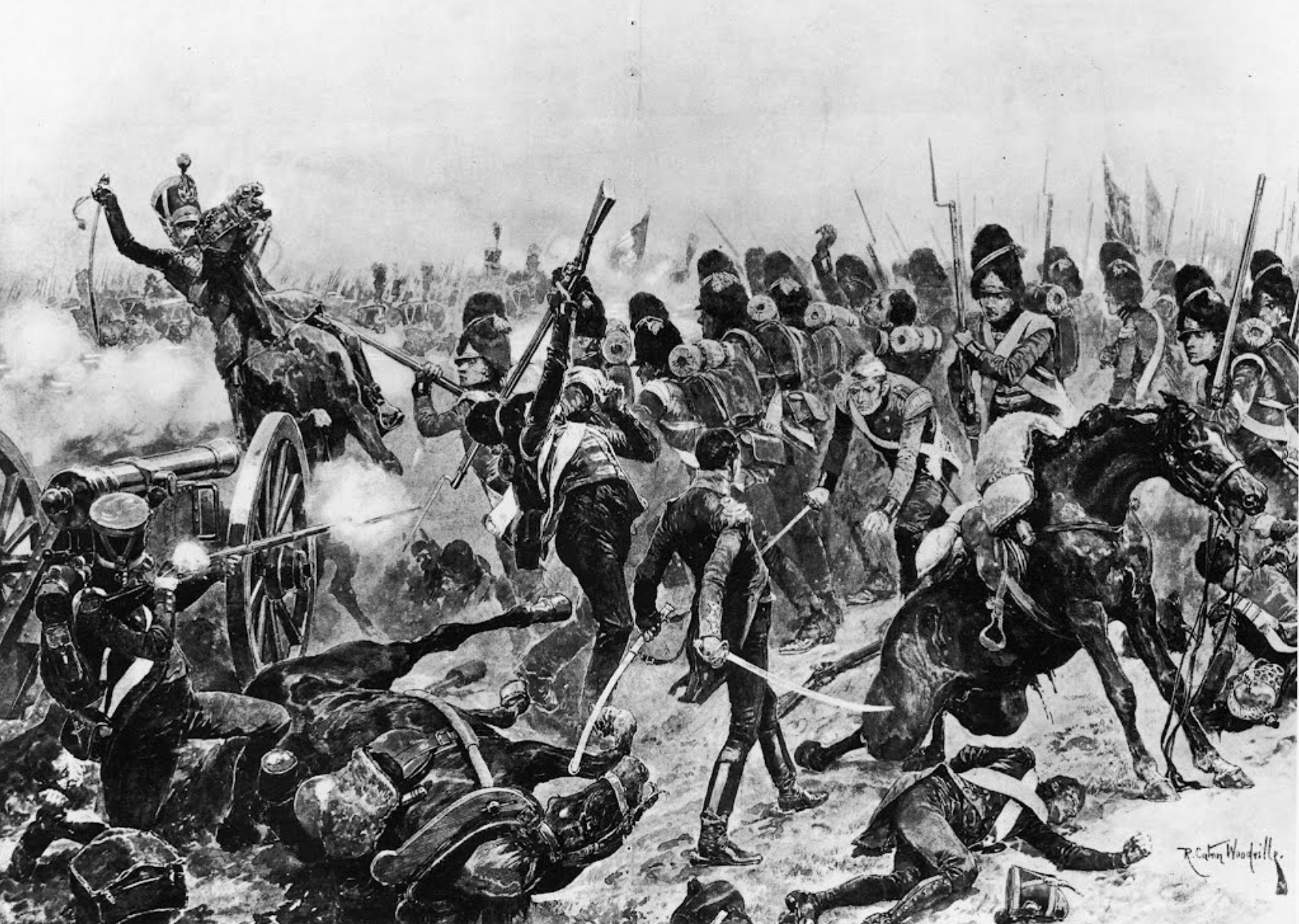
1890 illustration of the 3rd Division charging at Salamanca by Richard Caton Woodville Jr.

The division was part of the Allied British and Portuguese forces that took part in the Peninsular War. It fought at the Battle of Bussaco in September 1810, the Battle of Fuentes de Oñoro in May 1811 and the Battle of El Bodón in September 1811, before further combat at the Siege of Ciudad Rodrigo in January 1812, the Siege of Badajoz in March 1812 and the Battle of Salamanca in July 1812. It also fought at the Siege of Burgos in September 1812 and the Battle of Vitoria in June 1813. It then pursued the French army into France and saw action at the Battle of the Pyrenees in July 1813, the Battle of Nivelle in November 1813 and the Battle of the Nive in December 1813. After that it fought at the Battle of Orthez in February 1814 and the Battle of Toulouse in April 1814.

According to Picton, the fighting by the 3rd was so intense at the Battle of Vitoria, that the division lost 1,800 men (over one third of all Allied losses at the battle) having taken a key bridge and village, where they were subjected to fire by 40 to 50 cannons, and a counter-attack on the right flank (which was open because the rest of the army had not kept pace). The 3rd held their ground and pushed on with other divisions to capture the village of Arinez. The 3rd Division was also present at the Battle of Quatre Bras and the Battle of Waterloo in the Waterloo campaign under the command of Lieutenant-General Sir Charles Alten K.C.B. (Count Carl von Alten).

== Crimean War ==
The 3rd Division took part in the Crimean War and fought in the Battle of Alma and the Siege of Sevastopol. It was under the command of Lieutenant-General Sir Richard England.

== Second Boer War ==
During the Second Boer War (1899–1902) the division began under the command of General Gatacre. In 1902 the army was restructured, and a 3rd Infantry division was established permanently at Bordon as part of the 1st Army Corps, comprising the 5th and 6th Infantry Brigades.

== First World War ==
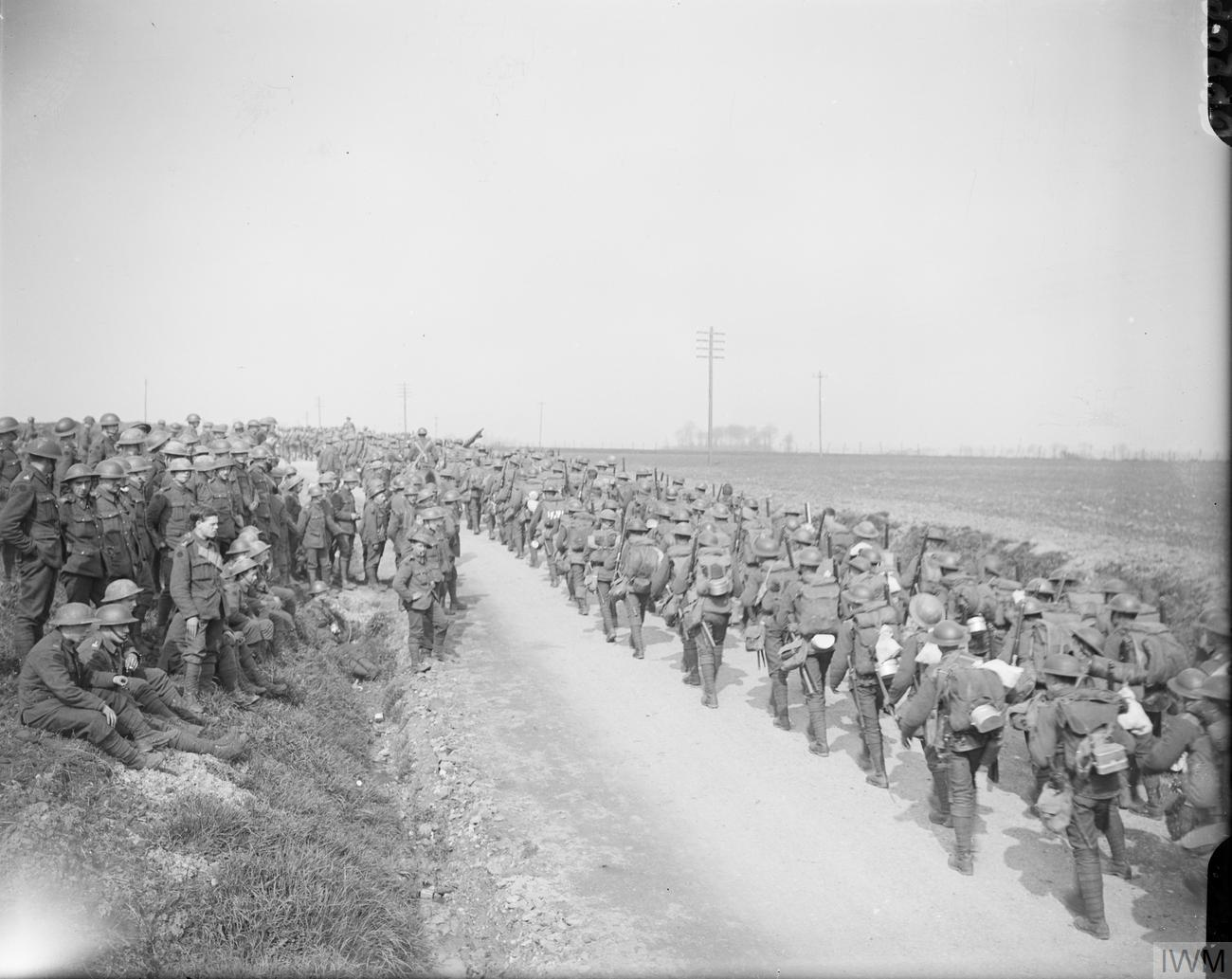
Men of the 1st Battalion, Royal Scots Fusiliers, watching the 7th (Service) Battalion, King's Shropshire Light Infantry, marching up to the outpost line, 11 April 1918.

During the First World War the 3rd Division was a permanently established Regular Army division that was amongst the first to be sent to France at the outbreak of the war as part of the British Expeditionary Force (BEF). The division served on the Western Front in France and Belgium for four years, from 1914 to 1918. During this time, it was nicknamed "The Iron Division". The division's first general officer commanding (GOC) during the war, Major General Hubert Hamilton, was killed by shellfire near Béthune on 14 October 1914, the first British divisional commander to be killed in the conflict.

The division served in many major battles of the war, including the Battle of Mons and the subsequent Great Retreat, and later the First Battle of Ypres, the Battle of the Somme, and the Battle of Passchendaele.

== Inter-war period ==
After the end of the First World War, the division was stationed in southern England where it formed part of Southern Command. In 1937, one of its brigades, the 9th Infantry Brigade, was commanded by Brigadier Bernard Montgomery. He assumed command of the 3rd Division shortly before Britain declared war on Germany in September 1939.

== Second World War ==
=== France 1940 ===
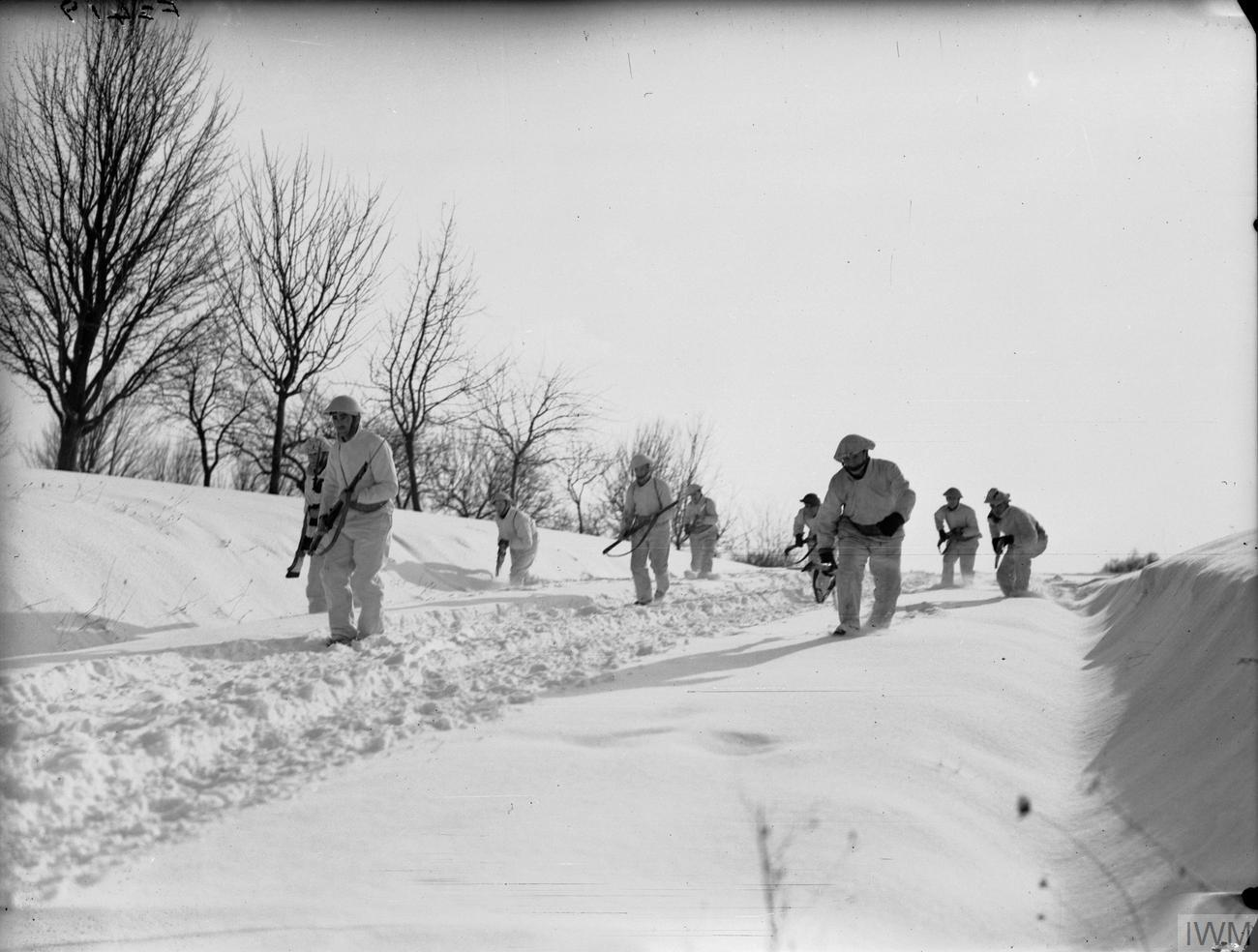
Men of the 2nd Battalion, East Yorkshire Regiment on exercise wearing snow suits, 4 February 1940.

The 3rd Infantry Division, under the command of Major-General Bernard Montgomery was sent overseas to France in late September 1939, just under a month after the outbreak of the Second World War. There the division became part of Lieutenant General Alan Brooke's II Corps of the British Expeditionary Force (BEF).

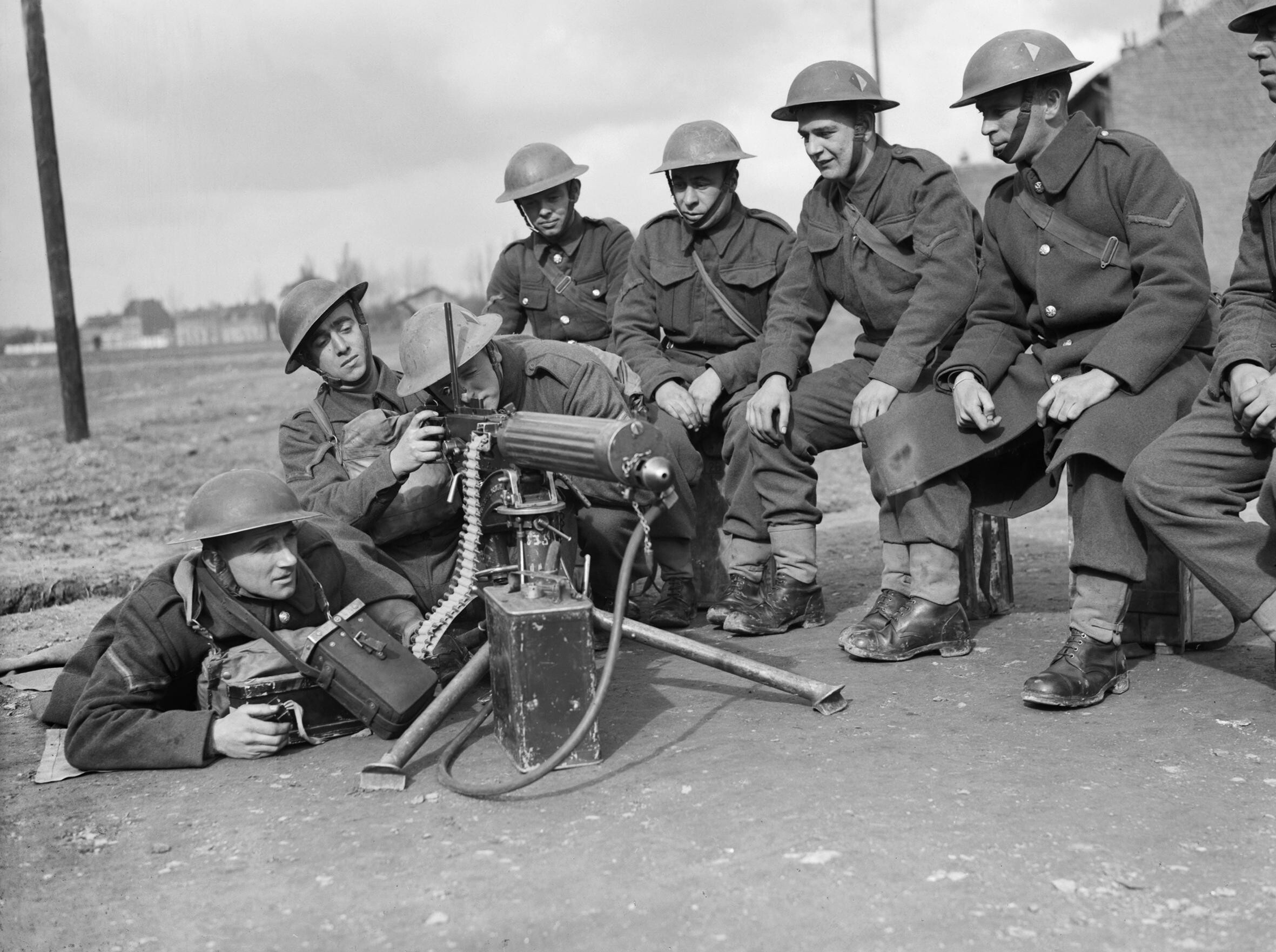
Troops from the 2nd Battalion, Middlesex Regiment, 3rd Division, training on the Vickers machine gun at Gondecourt, 21 March 1940.

In May 1940, after several months of relative inactivity, the German Army launched its attack in the west which resulted in the BEF being split up from the French Army, evacuated from Dunkirk. Due to Montgomery's strict training regime, the 3rd Division suffered comparatively few casualties and earned a reputation as one of the best British divisions in France. During the evacuation Montgomery was promoted to temporary command of II Corps and Brigadier Kenneth Anderson took temporary control of the division before, in July, Major General James Gammell assumed command.

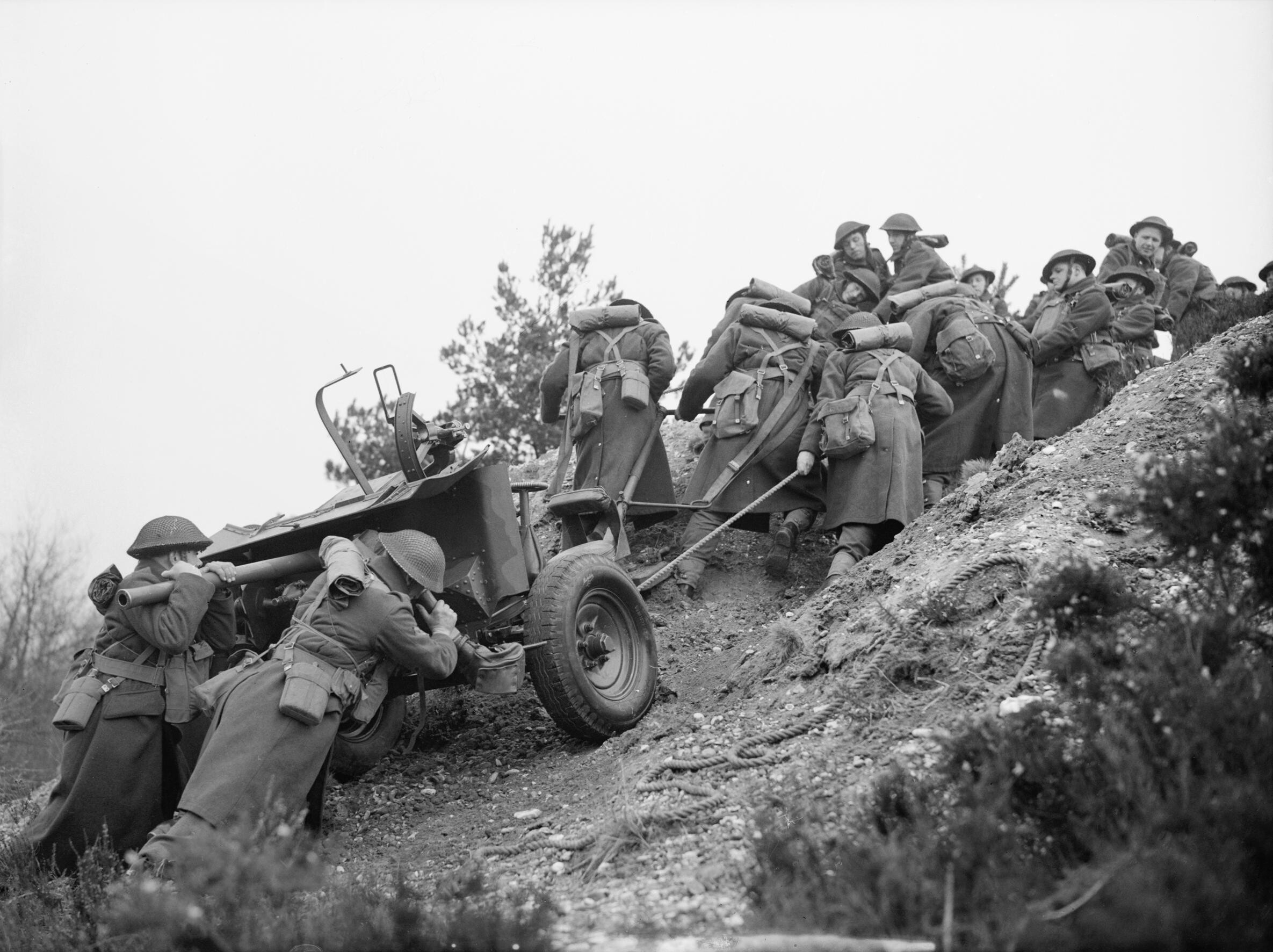
Gunners of the 20th Anti-Tank Regiment, 3rd Infantry Division, haul a 2-pdr anti-tank gun up a steep slope during training at Verwood in Dorset, 22 March 1941.

For over a year after Dunkirk the composition of 3rd Division remained largely unchanged (except that the motorcycle battalion was converted into 3rd (RNF) Reconnaissance Regiment, Reconnaissance Corps). Then, in September 1941, the 7th Guards Brigade was transferred to help create the Guards Armoured Division, and, in November, the 37th Infantry Brigade Group joined the 3rd Division and was renumbered 7th Brigade with the following composition: The brigade anti-tank companies were disbanded during 1941 and 92nd (Loyals) Light Anti-Aircraft Regiment, Royal Artillery, formerly the 7th Battalion, Loyal Regiment (North Lancashire), joined the division in March 1942. In June 1942, 3rd Infantry Division was reorganised as a 'Mixed' Division, with 33rd Tank Brigade replacing 7th Infantry Brigade. By early 1943, the experiment with 'mixed' divisions was abandoned, and division reverted to being an infantry formation, 33rd Tank Brigade being replaced by 185th Infantry Brigade.

=== France 1944 ===
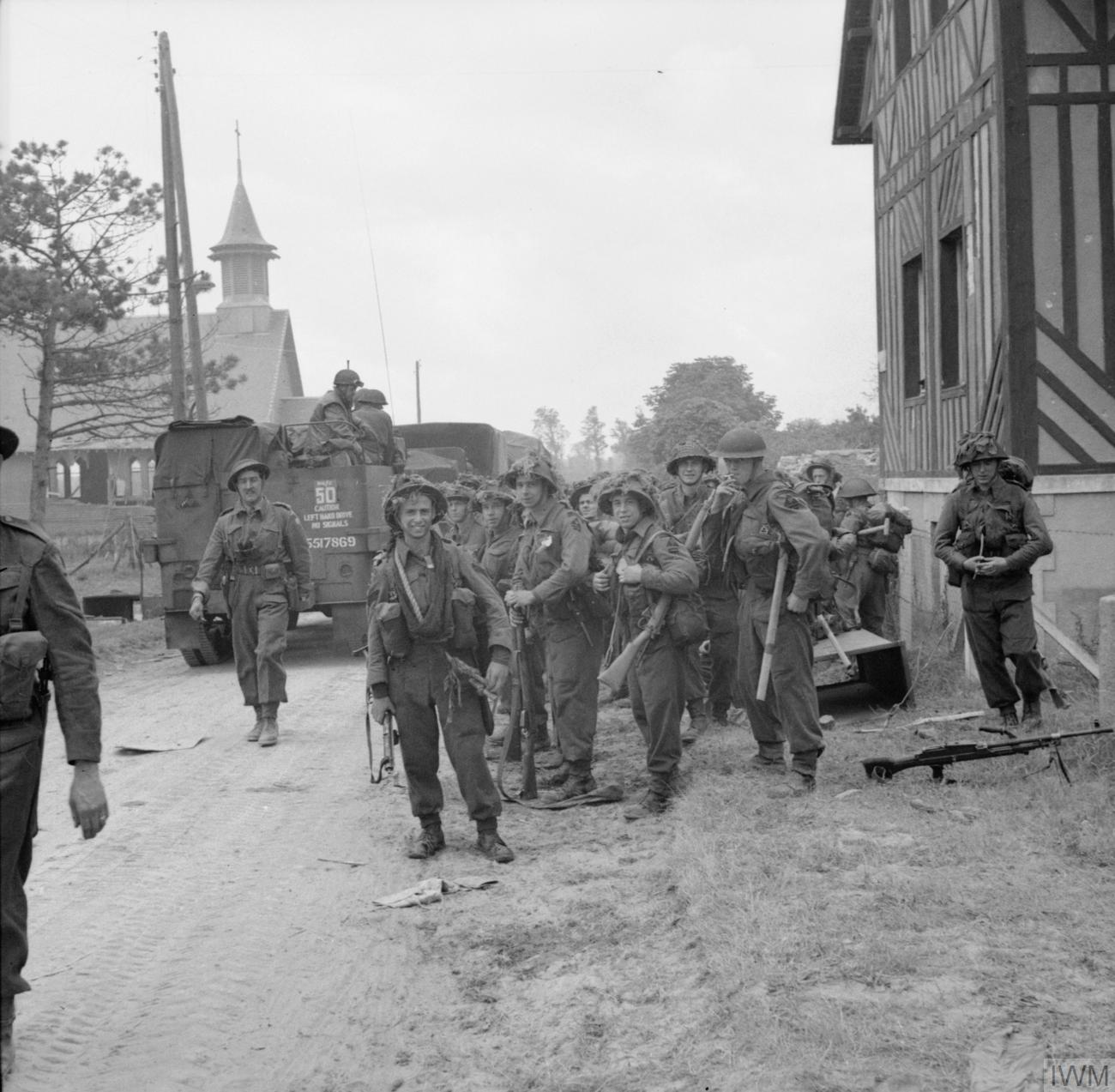
Men of 2nd Battalion, Royal Ulster Rifles pause during the move inland from Sword Beach, 6 June 1944.

The 3rd British Infantry Division was the first British formation to land at Sword Beach on D-Day, 6 June 1944, as part of the invasion of Normandy, part of the larger Operation Overlord. For the assault landing, 3rd British Division was organised as a Division Group, with other formations temporarily under its command. These included 27th Armoured Brigade (Sherman DD amphibious tanks of 13/18th Hussars, and the Sherman tanks of the Staffordshire Yeomanry and East Riding of Yorkshire Yeomanry) , 1st Special Service Brigade and No. 41 (Royal Marine) Commando, with 5th Royal Marine Independent Armoured Support Battery (Centaur IV close support tanks), and specialist units of the 79th Armoured Division: 22nd Dragoons (Sherman Crab mine clearing tanks), Royal Engineers 77 and 79 Assault Squadrons of 5th Assault Regiment (Churchill AVRE tanks for obstacle demolition).

The division's own artillery were all self-propelled (the artillery field regiments with M7 Priest; the anti-tank regiment: M10 tank destroyer) and the SP field guns and RM Centaurs were able to fire from their landing craft during the run-in to the beach. In addition, 3rd Division had 101 Beach Sub-Area HQ and No. 5 and No. 6 Beach groups under command for the assault phase: these included additional engineers, transport, pioneers, medical services and vehicle recovery sections which would hold and manage the beach landing area after the initial assault.

The 3rd Division's brigades were organised as brigade groups for the assault, with 8 Brigade Group making the first landing, followed by 185 Brigade Group and 9 Brigade Group in succession during the morning and early afternoon.

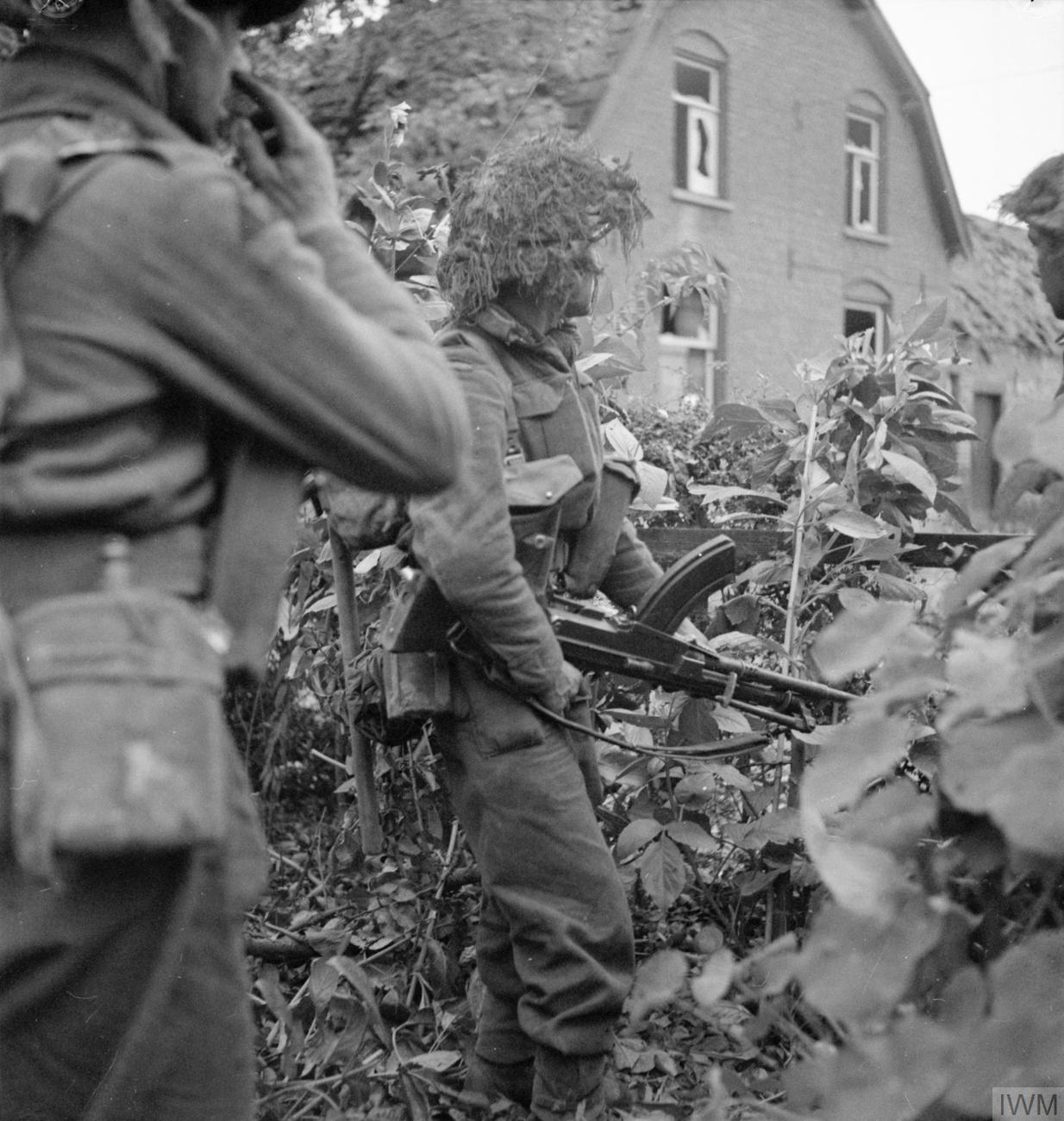
Men of the 2nd Battalion, East Yorkshire Regiment clearing houses in Venray, the Netherlands, 17 October 1944.

The 3rd Infantry Division fought through the Battle for Caen, in Operation Charnwood and Operation Goodwood.

=== Low countries and Germany ===
The division participated in the Allied advance from Paris to the Rhine and fought in the Netherlands and Belgium and later the Allied invasion of Germany. For the campaign in Normandy, the division was commanded by Major-General Tom Rennie until he was wounded on 13 June 1944; Major-General 'Bolo' Whistler, a highly popular commander, took command on 23 June 1944. During the campaign in Normandy, two posthumous Victoria Crosses were awarded to units under its command. In August 1944, corporal Sidney Bates of 1st Battalion, Royal Norfolk Regiment and in March 1945 Private James Stokes of the 2nd Battalion, King's Shropshire Light Infantry, both units part of the 185th Infantry Brigade.

During the often intense fighting from Sword Beach to Bremen, the 3rd Division suffered 2,586 killed with over 12,000 wounded. Following the German surrender, the division moved towards central Germany. It was then ordered to Berlin, to become part of the Western Allied garrison, but before a move could be made it was sent to Belgium. It was intended that the division would be flown to the United States, from where it would join the assault on Japan. With the surrender of Japan and the end of the Second World War, the move was cancelled.

== Post-war and Cold War ==
The division remained in Europe until October 1945, when it left for the Middle East. After spending time in Egypt and undertaking internal security operations during the Jewish insurgency, it was disbanded in June 1947. Sources differ on the specifics. The Imperial War Museum stated it was disbanded in Palestine while historians Lord and Watson stated the division first returned to the UK in April 1947 before being disbanded. However, they also note that at least one source (although not specified by the authors) claimed that the division was still active in Palestine until February 1948.

With the outbreak of the Korean War and the need for a divisional-sized strategic reserve based in the UK, the 3rd Infantry Division was reformed at Colchester, England, on 14 December 1950. In April 1951, the division helped form the signals regiment for the 1st Commonwealth Division, which served in the Korean War. In November, the entire formation was dispatched to Egypt to garrison the Suez Canal Zone. During this period, the Egyptian government abrogated the Anglo-Egyptian Treaty of 1936, which was the basis for British troops to remain in the canal area. The ensuing political landscape saw increased animosity to the British presence, eventually resulting in an agreement to withdraw. The division departed for the UK during 1954, where it returned to Colchester and its role as the British Army's strategic reserve. March 1955 saw troops deployed to Cyprus, during the Cyprus Emergency. The following year, the division was mobilised for Operation Musketeer, the attack on Egypt during the Suez Crisis. In the event of a successful invasion, the division would have severed as a follow-up formation and occupied Port Said. Only the divisional headquarters was dispatched, and the division was ultimately not deployed. In April 1959, the divisional headquarters moved from Colchester to Bulford.

In 1961, elements of the division were dispatched to Kuwait to deter an Iraqi invasion; signals personnel were sent to assist with the British Cameroons referendum; and other troops were sent to Kenya. Exercises in Libya followed in 1963, which also established the division in an air-portable role. Elements were dispatched to Cyprus, in February 1964, to support the forming United Nations Peacekeeping Force in Cyprus. That lasted until August, when the UN force was activated. On 1 April 1968, the Army Strategic Command was formed in the UK, with a goal of supporting NATO forces from as far north as Norway to as far south as Turkey; to provide internal security operations world-wide; and to undertake limited operations in conjunction with allies. The 3rd Division was assigned to this command, and from 1969 onwards was the primary British formation that would reinforce European-based NATO forces in the event of the Cold War heating up. Under Operation Banner, the division also deployed troops to Northern Ireland for four-month tours of duty. During 1974, the division returned to Cyprus in response to the Turkish invasion.

== Armoured division ==
The 1975 Mason Review, a government white paper, outlined a new defence policy that removed the UK-based divisional-sized strategic reserve and also resulted in the restructure of the British Army of the Rhine (BAOR). With its role eliminated, the 3rd Division was disbanded. It was reformed in Soest, Germany, on 1 September 1977, as the 3rd Armoured Division. Its reformation increased the BAOR to four divisions, for the first time since the end of the 1950s. Each division consisted of two armoured regiments, three mechanised infantry battalions, and two artillery regiments.

The Mason Review removed brigades and replaced them with a concept of task forces or battlegroups. It was intended that the division could form up to five battlegroups, with each commanded by either an armoured regiment or an infantry battalion. These groups were to be formed for a specific task and allocated the required forces needed. The divisional commander (general officer commanding (GOC)) would oversee these battlegroups, but early training showed this to be impractical. To compensate, the divisional headquarters was increased to 750 men (wartime strength) and included two brigadiers. Each officer would command a flexible task force, which consisted of the battlegroups the GOC had formed. The division's task forces were named Task Force Echo and Task Force Foxtrot. These were not a reintroduction of a brigade command structure and had no administrative responsibilities. The approach intended to provide greater flexibility in tailoring forces to meet unforeseen events and allow for an overall reduction in the size of a division by 700 men. The task force concept was dropped by the end of the decade, having been deemed to have not met expectations. The division then comprised the 6th and the 33rd Armoured Brigades, with each made up of two mechanised infantry battalions and one armoured regiment.

In 1981, John Nott, the Secretary of State for Defence for the government elected in 1979, announced the 1981 Defence White Paper. It, like the Mason Review, aimed to balance the British military in line with the nation's financial resources and save manpower. Resultingly, the BAOR was restructured from four armoured divisions of two brigades, into a force of three divisions of three brigades. The division then comprised the 4th (based in Münster), the 6th (Soest), and the 33rd Armoured Brigades (Paderborn). During the 1980s, the 33rd Armoured Brigade joined the 4th Armoured Division and in exchange the 3rd Armoured Division received the 19th Infantry Brigade (Colchester, England). During 1983, the 6th Armoured Brigade converted into the 6th Airmobile Brigade and maintained that role until 1988.

The end of the 1980s saw the dissolution of the Soviet Union and the end of the Cold War. In July 1990, the British government announced Options for Change. This framework sought to restructure the British military based on the new strategic situation, allow for further cost saving measures to be enacted, and to reduce the BAOR by half. During September and October 1992, the division relocated from Germany to Bulford, Wiltshire where it was reorganised as a mechanized infantry division known as the 3rd (United Kingdom) Division.

== Post–Cold War ==
Following its reorganisation, the 3rd (United Kingdom) Division (also referred to as the 3rd (UK) Mechanised Division) was assigned to the Allied Rapid Reaction Corps, a newly formed NATO HQ that was administered by the UK. Around 8,400 strong, it comprised the 1st (Tidworth) and the 19th (Mechanised) Brigades (Catterick), in conjunction with the 5th (Airborne) Brigade (Aldershot), the 2nd (National Communications) Brigade (Corsham), and the 43rd (Wessex) Brigade (Exeter). The 1st and 19th Brigades each contained a Challenger 1 tank-equipped armoured regiment, an armoured infantry battalion carried in Warrior tracked armoured vehicles, and two mechanised infantry battalions carried in Saxon armoured personnel carriers. In the event of a major emergency, as part of agreements between the UK and Italy, the division could be reinforced by the 132nd Armored Brigade "Ariete". During the 1990s, the division deployed troops to Angola, the Falkland Islands, Kosovo, Northern Ireland as part of Operation Banner, and Rwanda. Most notably, in December 1995, following the signing of the Dayton Agreement, the division was the first British formation deployed as part of the Implementation Force to serve as peacekeepers in Bosnia and Herzegovina and remained through 1996. The British contribution to this force eventually came under the guidance of the Multi-National Division (South-West), which was administered by the 3rd Division for six months. Command then rotated to the 1st (UK) Armoured Division. During 1999, the 5th Airborne Brigade was converted into the 12th Mechanised Brigade (still based at Aldershot). The division's tanks were replaced by 165 Challenger 2s. By the early 2000s, the formation's strength ranged from 18–21,600, depending on the source.

== Afghanistan and Iraq ==
Following the United States invasion of Afghanistan, in December 2001, the divisional headquarters was dispatched to Kabul as part of the International Security Assistance Force. It oversaw a multinational brigade until command was handed over to other NATO forces. From 2006 onwards, Task Force Helmand (based on a reinforced brigade) was formed to conduct stabilisation and counter-insurgency missions in Helmand Province. Between April and October 2007, the division's 12th Mechanised Brigade was deployed to serve as the core of Task Force Helmand; it was replaced by the division's newly added 52nd Infantry Brigade from October through to April 2008; the 19th Brigade deployed between April and October 2009; the 4th Mechanised Brigade undertook a tour between April and October 2010; the 12th Brigade returned between April and October 2011; followed by the 4th Brigade (joined the division in 2008) until April 2013; and the division's final deployment to Task Force Helmand came between April and October 2013, when then the 1st Brigade was dispatched. The task force was maintained until 2014, consisting of 1st Armoured Division units, when it was disbanded following the British withdrawal.

In June 2003, following the initial stage of the 2003 Invasion of Iraq and start of security and stabilisation responsibilities, the 19th Mechanised Brigade was deployed to Basra, Iraq, to replace the 1st (UK) Armoured Division's 7th Armoured Brigade. This was followed by the divisional headquarters, which replaced the 1st (UK) Armoured Division on 11 July. The Multi-National Division (South-East) was subsequently formed to oversee all Multi-National Forces in southern Iraq. The British portion of this force was based around a reinforced brigade, which came from different parent formations and were rotated through several deployments. The 3rd Division held operational control of the Multi-National Division until December 2003, when it passed command to other forces. The 3rd Division's headquarters undertook additional tours of Iraqi between July 2006 and January 2007 as well as in 2008, during these periods it also controlled the Multi-National Division. Between April and November 2004, the division's 1st Mechanised Brigade was dispatched to Iraq under the oversight of the Multi-National Division; the 12th Mechanised Brigade was deployed between April and October 2005; the 19th Brigade between November 2006 and June 2007; the 1st Mechanized Brigade returned between June and December 2007; and the division's final deployment, under the oversight of the Multi-National Division, was made by the newly added 4th Mechanised Brigade between December 2007 and June 2008.

== Army 2020 ==
On 1 January 2005, the 19th Mechanised Brigade was converted into the 19th Light Brigade. It then moved from Catterick to Northern Ireland in 2008. The following year, the 4th Mechanised Brigade moved from Germany and joined the division. This was followed, during April 2007, with the addition of the 52nd Infantry Brigade. By the late 2000s, the division comprised the 1st Mechanised Brigade (based at Tidworth), the 12th Mechnised Brigade (Aldershot), the 19th Light Brigade, and the 52nd Infantry Brigade (Edinburgh). In 2013, the 19th Brigade was disbanded leaving the division with just four brigades.

The Strategic Defence and Security Review of 2010 outlined the Army 2020 plan. This project aimed to restructure the army from one optimized for the War in Afghanistan, to one that was more flexible and included the establishment of a "Reaction Force" and an "Adaptable Force". The latter would be based around the 1st (United Kingdom) Division, while the 3rd Division would serve as the basis for the Reaction Force. The division's new role required it to be held in a state of high readiness, ready to be deployed to undertake operations on short notice, and all its forces were concentrated around the Salisbury Plain Training Area. The restructured division then contained the 1st, 12th, and 20th Brigades. These were all renamed from "Mechanised" brigades to "Armoured Infantry" brigades, with each containing an armoured cavalry regiment for reconnaissance, an armoured regiment equipped with Challenger 2 main battle tanks, two armoured infantry battalions carried in Warriors, and one infantry battalion carried in Mastiff infantry mobility vehicles (this battalion being described as a 'heavy protected mobility' battalion). The division also included the 101st Logistic Brigade, and could be supported by the 16 Air Assault Brigade as part of the reaction force. By 2016, the division had a strength of around 16,000 personnel.

Further changes occurred following the 2015 Strategic Defence and Security Review, which resulted in Army 2020 Refine that was implemented in 2019. Army 2020 Refine saw the 1st Artillery Brigade, the 25th Engineer Group, and the 7th Air Defence Group all added to the division.

In 2024, the 7th Air Defence Group was resubordinated to HQ ARRC.

In 2025, it was reported that the division would be reorganised as a fully-tracked maneuver formation centred around Challenger 3 tanks and Ajax armoured fighting vehicles.

== Organisation ==
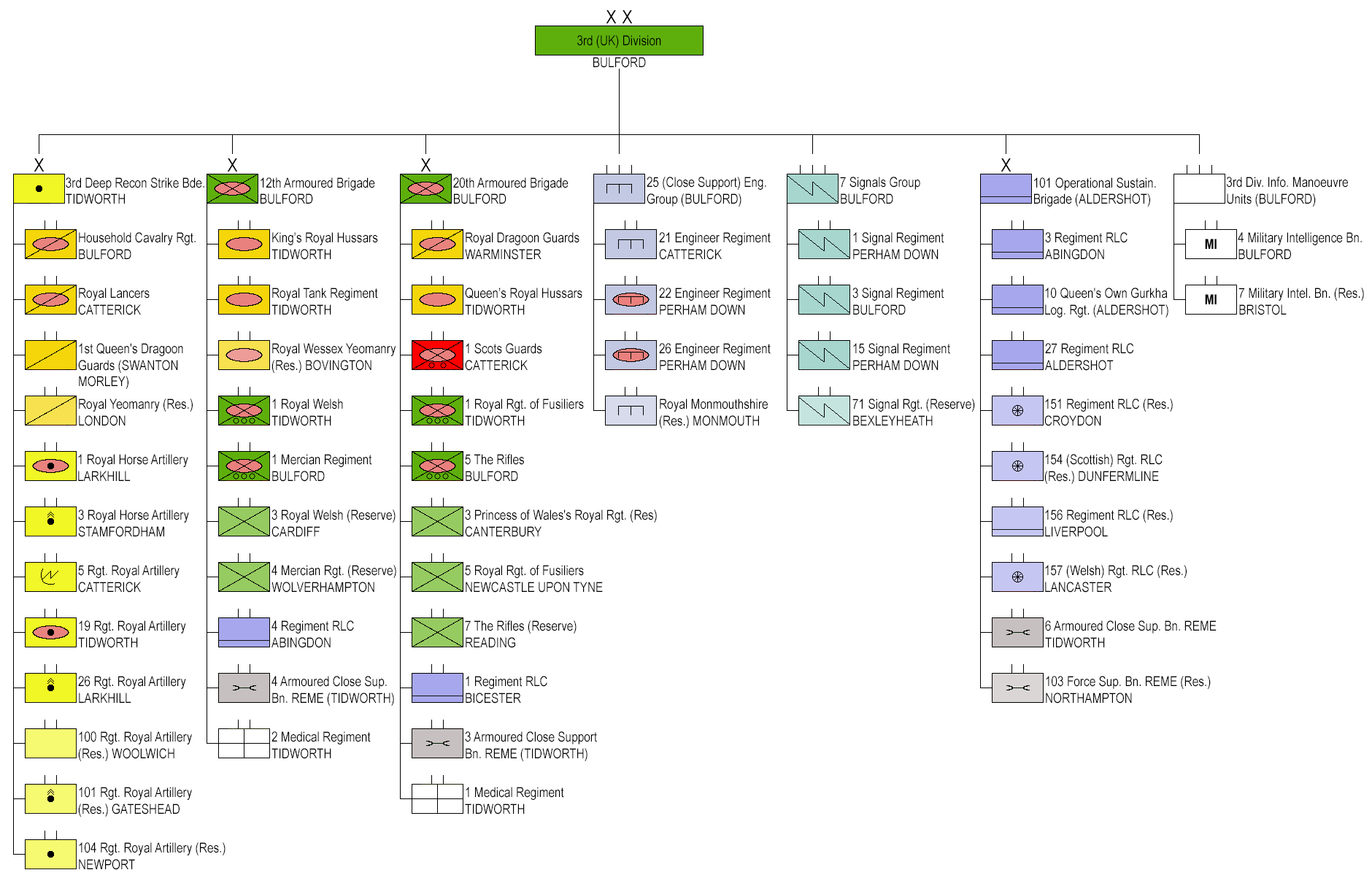
3rd (UK) Division organization as of January 2026 (click to enlarge)

- 3rd (UK) Division, in Bulford
  - 3rd Deep Reconnaissance Strike Brigade (Tidworth)
  - 12th Armoured Brigade (Bulford)
  - 20th Armoured Brigade (Bulford)
  - 101 Operational Sustainment Brigade (Aldershot)
  - 25 (Close Support) Engineer Group (Bulford)
  - 4th Military Intelligence Battalion, Intelligence Corps (Bulford)
  - 7th Military Intelligence Battalion, Intelligence Corps (Bristol)
  - 1st Signal Regiment, Royal Corps of Signals (Perham Down)
  - 3rd Signal Regiment, Royal Corps of Signals (Bulford)
  - 15th Signal Regiment, Royal Corps of Signals (Perham Down)
  - 71st Signal Regiment, Royal Corps of Signals (Bexley Heath)

== The Iron Division nickname ==
During the First World War, the division obtained the nickname "the ironsides" and "The Iron Division. Norman Scarfe, the divisional historian for the period 1943-1945, argued against a continuation of the nickname beyond the First World War. He wrote that while it was a complement to be associated with the term, it was a nickname "earned by quite different groups of units in quite different circumstances, not by the 3rd Division in its Assault form. 'Ironsides' is surely another not entirely justifiable reference to East Anglia, where Cromwell did his recruiting; and Iron, a symbol of strength and resolution of the 3rd Division in the Four Years' War, can also suggest inflexibility and cruelty, rust and robots. The distinction of being British [in comparison to the 3rd Canadian Division], on the other hand, is open to only one interpretation. It is the most suitable of all titles. There was only one 3rd British Division fighting in Europe, and from D-Day until the Germans were defeated the men of the division deserved the honour of their name." The separation of traditions was also suggested by Lieutenant-Colonel T. F. Furnell, secretary of the Association of the 3rd (Iron) Division, who in a reunion speech to Second World War 3rd Division veterans stated "You of the 3rd British Division have more than lived up to the tradition of the Iron Division." The Imperial War Museum highlighted that while the nickname was earned during the First World War, it continued on through the Second World War and indicated Major-General Bernard Montgomery (who took command in 1939) referred to the division as such. Per Patrick Delaforce, Montgomery told an officer "I knew it in the last war – it was known as the 'Iron Division' then and it is going to be known as the "Iron Division" in this war." The modern-day division still refers to itself as such.

== See also ==
- List of commanders of the British 3rd Division
- List of British divisions in World War I
- List of British divisions in World War II
- British Army Order of Battle (September 1939)
- Formation reconnaissance regiment
