= List of current Army Reserve units of the British Army =

Reserves of British Army

This page is a list of current Army Reserve units of the British Army.

== The Honourable Artillery Company ==
The Honourable Artillery Company is organized as follows.

- Regimental Headquarters, at Finsbury Barracks, City of London
  - Headquarters Squadron
    - Honourable Artillery Company Band
  - 1 Squadron
  - 2 Squadron
  - 3 Squadron
  - A (1st City of London) Battery – paired with 7 Parachute Regiment RHA

== Royal Armoured Corps ==
The Reserve regiments of the Royal Armoured Corps are known as the Yeomanry.

- The Royal Yeomanry (Light Reconnaissance) – Paired with 1st The Queen's Dragoon Guards
  - Regimental Headquarters, in South Wigston, Leicester (moved from Fulham)
  - Command and Support (Westminster Dragoons) Squadron, at Fulham House, Fulham, London
  - A (Sherwood Rangers Yeomanry) Squadron, in Carlton, Nottingham
  - B (Warwickshire and Worcestershire Yeomanry) Squadron, at Alamein House, Dudley – formerly B (Staffordshire, Warwick, and Worcs Yeo) Sqn
  - C (Kent and Sharpshooters Yeomanry) Squadron, at The Barracks, Croydon
    - 3 Troop, at Combermere Barracks, Windsor
  - D (Shropshire Yeomanry) Squadron, in Telford
    - Cardiff Troop, in Cardiff (formed in 2021)
  - E (Leicestershire and Derbyshire Yeomanry) Squadron, in South Wigston, Leicester
- Royal Wessex Yeomanry (Armoured Replacement) – Paired with Royal Tank Regiment and Queen's Royal Hussars
  - Regimental Headquarters, at Allenby Barracks, Bovington Camp
  - A (Queen's Own Dorset Yeomanry) Squadron, at Bovington Camp – regimental HQ squadron
  - B (Royal Wiltshire Yeomanry (Prince of Wales's Own)) Squadron, at Old Sarum House, Salisbury
  - C (Royal Gloucestershire Hussars) Squadron, in Cirencester
    - Cassino Troop, maintaining the Precision Gunnery Training Equipment Suite, at Venning Barracks, MoD Donnington
  - D (Royal Devon Yeomanry) Squadron, at Wyvern Barracks, Exeter
    - Barnstaple Troop, at Fortescue Lines, Barnstaple
  - Y (Royal Wiltshire Yeomanry (Prince of Wales's Own)) Squadron, in Swindon
- The Queen's Own Yeomanry (Light Reconnaissance) – Paired with regular The Light Dragoons
  - Regimental Headquarters in Newcastle upon Tyne
  - Command and Support (Northumberland Hussars) Squadron, Newcastle upon Tyne
  - A (Yorkshire Yeomanry) Squadron, York
  - B (Duke of Lancaster's Own Yeomanry) Squadron, Wigan
  - C (Cheshire Yeomanry) Squadron, Chester
- The Scottish and North Irish Yeomanry (Light Reconnaissance) – Paired with regular Royal Scots Dragoon Guards
  - Regimental Headquarters in Edinburgh
  - A (The Earl of Carrick's Own Ayrshire Yeomanry) Squadron, Ayr
  - B (The North Irish Horse) Squadron, Belfast
  - C (Fife and Forfar Yeomanry) Squadron, Cupar
  - E Command and Support (Lothians and Border Horse) Squadron, Edinburgh

== Royal Regiment of Artillery ==
The Royal Regiment of Artillery is organized as follows.

- 100 (Yeomanry) Regiment, Royal Artillery
  - Regimental Headquarters, at Royal Artillery Barracks, Woolwich Station
  - All Arms Staff Pool
  - 221 (Wessex) Battery, at Royal Artillery Barracks, Larkhill Garrison
  - 255 (Somerset Yeomanry) Battery, at Upper Bristol Road Army Reserve Centre, Bath
- 101 (Northumbrian) Regiment, Royal Artillery – Divisional MLRS paired with 26th Regiment Royal Artillery
  - Regimental Headquarters and Headquarters Troop, at Napier Armoury, Gateshead
  - 203 (Elswick) Battery, in Blyth
  - 204 (Tyneside Scottish) Battery, in Kingston Park, Newcastle upon Tyne
    - Hexham Troop, at Dare Wilson Barracks, Hexham
  - 205 (3rd Durham Volunteer Artillery) Battery, at Northfield Gardens, South Shields
    - Catterick Troop, at Marne Barracks, Catterick Garrison
  - 269 (West Riding) Battery, at Carlton Gate, Leeds
- 103 (Lancashire Artillery Volunteers) Regiment, Royal Artillery – Light gun regiment paired with 3rd Regiment Royal Horse Artillery and 4th Regiment Royal Artillery
  - Regimental Headquarters and Headquarters Troop, at Jubilee Barracks, Saint Helens
    - Lancashire Artillery Volunteers Band, at Nelson Street Army Reserve Centre, Bolton
    - Lancashire Artillery Pipes and Drums
  - 208 (3rd West Lancashire) Battery, at Brigadier Philip Toosy Barracks, Liverpool
    - Isle of Man Troop, at Lord Street Army Reserve Centre, Douglas, Isle of Man – formed in 2018
  - 209 (Manchester Artillery) Battery, at Belle Vue Street Army Reserve Centre, Manchester
  - 210 (Staffordshire) Battery, at Wolseley House, Wolverhampton
    - C (South Nottinghamshire Hussars, Royal Horse Artillery) Troop, at Hucknall Lane Army Reserve Centre, Bulwell – formed in 2018
  - 216 (Bolton Artillery) Battery, at Nelson Street Army Reserve Centre, Bolton
- 104 Regiment, Royal Artillery – Light gun regiment paired with 1st Regiment Royal Horse Artillery
  - Regimental Headquarters and Headquarters Troop, at Raglan Barracks, Newport
  - 211 (South Wales) Battery, in Abertillery
    - C (Glamorgan Yeomanry) Troop, in Cardiff
    - F (Brecknockshire and Monmouthshire) Troop
  - 214 (Worcestershire) Battery, at Dancox House, Worcester
  - 217 (City of Newport) Battery, at Raglan Barracks, Newport
  - 266 (Gloucestershire Volunteer Artillery) Battery, at Artillery Grounds, Bristol
- 105 Regiment, Royal Artillery – Light gun regiment paired with 19th Regiment Royal Artillery
  - Regimental Headquarters, at Artillery House, Redford Barracks, Edinburgh
  - 206 (Ulster) Battery, in Newtownards
    - B Troop, in Coleraine
  - 207 (City of Glasgow) Battery, in Glasgow
  - 212 (Highland) Battery, in Arbroath
    - F Troop, in Kirkcaldy
    - G Troop, at Fort Charlotte, Lerwick
  - 278 (Lowland) Battery "City of Edinburgh", in Livingston
    - I Troop, at Redford Barracks, Edinburgh
- 106 (Yeomanry) Regiment, Royal Artillery – Air defence regiment paired with 12th Regiment Royal Artillery and 16th Regiment Royal Artillery
  - Regimental Headquarters and Headquarters Troop, Grove Park
  - 265 (Home Counties) Battery, Grove Park – paired with 12 (Minden) Air Assault Battery in 16 Air Assault Brigade
  - 295 (Hampshire Yeomanry) Battery, Portsmouth
  - 457 (Hampshire Carabiniers Yeomanry) Battery, Southampton

== Corps of Royal Engineers ==
The Corps of Royal Engineers is organized as follows.

- 131 Commando Squadron, London/Plymouth/Bath
- 135 Geographic Squadron, Ewell
- 299 Parachute Squadron, in Kingston upon Hull – Supporting 23 Parachute Engineer Regiment
  - No. 1 Parachute Troop, in Kingston upon Hull
  - No. 2 Parachute Troop, in Wakefield
  - No. 2 Parachute Troop, in Pontefract
- 508 (Works) Specialist Team, Chilwell
- 510 (Air Infrastructure) Specialist Team, Chilwell
- 525 (Works) Specialist Team, Chilwell
- 530 (Materiel) Specialist Team, Chilwell (Hybrid)
- 534 (Airfields) Specialist Team, Chilwell
- Royal Monmouthshire Royal Engineers
  - Regimental Headquarters and Headquarters Troop, at Monmouth Castle
  - Jersey Field Squadron (Royal Militia of the Isle of Jersey), in Saint Helier, Jersey
    - Guernsey Troop, at Saint Peter Port, Guernsey
  - 100 (Militia) Field Squadron, at Chapman House, Cwmbran
    - 1 Troop, at Artillery Grounds, Bristol
    - 2 Troop, in Llandaff, Cardiff
  - 108 (Welsh) Field Squadron (Militia), at John Chard VC House, Swansea
  - 225 (City of Birmingham) Field Squadron (Militia), at Gundolph House, Oldbury
    - 1 Troop, at Baskeyfield House, Stoke-on-Trent
    - 2 Troop, in Cannock
- 65 Works Group
  - Group Headquarters and Support Echelon, Chilwell
  - 503 (Fuel Infrastructure) Specialist Team, Chilwell
  - 504 (Power Infrastructure) Specialist Team, Chilwell
  - 506 (Water Infrastructure) Specialist Team, Chilwell
  - 507 (Railway Infrastructure) Specialist Team, Chilwell
  - 509 (Port Infrastructure) Specialist Team, Chilwell
- 71 Engineer Regiment – Paired with 39 Engineer Regiment
  - Regimental Headquarters and Headquarters Troop, at Waterloo Lines, Leuchars Station
  - 103 (Tyne Electrical Engineers) Field Squadron, at Debdon Gardens, Heaton, Newcastle upon Tyne – formerly under 21 Engineer Regiment, but moved to 71 Engineer Regiment following Army 2020 Refine and designation changed from '1st Newcastle' to 'Tyne Electrical Engineers' subsequently
    - 2 Troop, in Sunderland
  - 102 (Clyde) Field Squadron (Air Support), at Anzio Lines, Paisley
    - 2 Troop, in Cumbernauld
  - 124 (Lowland) Field Squadron (Air Support), in Glasgow
    - 2 Troop, at Waterloo Lines, Leuchars Station
    - 10 (Orkney) Troop, in Kirkwall, Orkney
    - 236 (Logistic) Troop, at Kinloss Barracks, Kinloss
  - 591 Field Squadron, in Bangor
- 75 Engineer Regiment – Paired with 36 Engineer Regiment
  - Regimental Headquarters and Headquarters Troop, at Peninsula Barracks, Warrington
  - 106 (West Riding) Field Squadron, at Bailey Barracks, Sheffield – formerly part of 32 Engineer Regiment, but transferred out following Army 2020 Refine
    - 2 Troop, in Batley
  - 107 (Lancaster and Cheshire) Field Squadron, in Birkenhead
    - 2 Troop, at Peninsula Barracks, Warrington
  - 202 Field Squadron, in Manchester
- 101 (City of London) Engineer Regiment (Explosive Ordnance Disposal & Search)
  - Regimental Headquarters and Headquarters Troop, at Hudson House, Catford
  - 217 (London) Field Squadron (EOD&S), in Ilford
    - 3 Troop, in Southend-on-Sea
  - 221 Field Squadron (EOD&S), at Hudson House, Catford
    - 1 Troop, in Bexleyheath
  - 350 (Sherwood Foresters) Field Squadron (EOD&S), at Foresters House, Chilwell
    - 2 & 3 Troops, at Wallis Barracks, Chesterfield
  - 579 Field Squadron (EOD&S), in Royal Tunbridge Wells
    - 2 (Surrey Yeomanry) Troop, in Redhill
    - 3 Troop, in Rochester

== Royal Corps of Signals ==
The Royal Corps of Signals reserve component was severely reduced after the 2009 Review of Reserve Forces, losing many full regiments, with their respective squadrons mostly reduced to troops. Below is the list of units part of the corps down to platoon (troop) size.

- Joint Service Support Unit, at RAF Digby (Army Reserve elements)
- 63 (Special Air Service) Signal Squadron, at Stirling Lines, Hereford and a troop in Portsmouth
- Central Volunteer Headquarters, Royal Corps of Signals, at Basil Hill Barracks, Corsham
  - 254 (Specialist Group Information Services) Signal Squadron
  - Royal Corps of Signals Specialist Pool
  - Royal Corps of Signals Full Time Reserve Service
- 32nd Signal Regiment
  - Regimental Headquarters, in Glasgow
  - 2 (City of Dundee) Signal Squadron, in Dundee
    - 851 (Highland) Signal Troop, at Gordon Barracks, Aberdeen
  - 40 (North Irish Horse) Signal Squadron, in Belfast
    - 840 (Ulster) Signal Troop
  - 51 (Scottish) Signal Squadron, in Edinburgh
    - 852 (Lowland) Signal Troop, in East Kilbride
  - 52 Support Squadron, in Glasgow
- 37th Signal Regiment
  - Regimental Headquarters, in Redditch
  - 33 (Lancashire and Cheshire) Signal Squadron, in Liverpool
    - 842 (City of Manchester) Signal Troop, in Manchester
    - 880 (Cheshire Yeomanry (Earl of Chester's)) Signal Troop
    - 893 (East Lancashire) Signal Troop
  - 48 (City of Birmingham) Signal Squadron, in Birmingham
    - 896 (City of Coventry) Signal Troop, in Coventry
    - 898 Signal Troop
  - 64 (City of Sheffield) Signal Squadron, in Sheffield
    - 849 (City of Leeds) Signal Troop, in Leeds
    - 864 (City of Sheffield) Signal Troop
    - 887 (City of Nottingham) Signal Troop, in Nottingham
  - 54 (Queen's Own Warwickshire and Worcestershire Yeomanry) Support Squadron, in Redditch
    - 867 (Capability Development) Signal Troop
- 39th Signal Regiment (The Skinners)
  - Regimental Headquarters, in Bristol
  - 43 (Wessex and City & County of Bristol) Signal Squadron, in Bath
    - 857 (City and County of Bristol) Signal Troop, in Bristol
  - 53 (Wales and Western) Signal Squadron, in Cardiff
    - Western Signal Troop, in Gloucester
  - 94 (Berkshire Yeomanry) Signal Squadron, in Windsor
- 71st (City of London) Yeomanry Signal Regiment
  - Regimental Headquarters, in Bexleyheath
  - 31 (Middlesex Yeomanry and Princess Louises's Kensington) Signal Squadron, in Uxbridge
    - 847 (Middlesex Yeomanry) Signal Troop
    - 841 (Princess Louises's Kensington) Signal Troop, in Coulsdon
  - 36 (Essex Yeomanry) Signal Squadron, in Colchester
    - 836 (Eastern) Signal Troop
    - 854 (East Anglian) Signal Troop
    - 907 (Essex Yeomanry) Signal Troop, in Chelmsford
  - 68 (Inns of Court & City Yeomanry) Signal Squadron, in Whipps Cross
    - 847 (London) Signal Troop, in White City, London
  - 265 (Kent and County of London Yeomanry (Sharpshooters)) Support Squadron, in Bexleyheath

== Infantry ==
- London Guards
  - 1st Battalion, London Guards – Paired with the foot guards battalions under London District. (Note: The London Guards consists of four companies, each of which forms part of the foot guards regiment whose cap badge it has adopted. Each company serves as that regiment's Army Reserve unit.)
    - Battalion Headquarters, in Battersea
    - G (Messines) Company, Scots Guards, in Westminster
      - Mortar Platoon, at Hudson House, Bellingham
    - No 15 (Loos) Company, Irish Guards, at Connaught House, Camberwell – battalion HQ coy
    - No 17 Company, Coldstream Guards, in Hammersmith
    - Ypres Company, Grenadier Guards, in Kingston upon Thames
      - Rifle Platoon, in Southall
- The Royal Regiment of Scotland
  - 52nd Lowland, 6th Battalion, The Royal Regiment of Scotland – Paired with 2 SCOTS
    - Battalion Headquarters and Headquarters Company, Glasgow
    - A (Royal Scots Borderers) Company, at Hepburn House, Edinburgh
      - Lowland Band of the Royal Regiment of Scotland
      - Platoon, in Galashiels
      - Platoon, in Bathgate, Edinburgh
    - B (Royal Highland Fusiliers) Company, in Ayr
      - Platoon, in Dumfries
    - C (Royal Highland Fusiliers) Company, in Glasgow
      - Platoon, at Scottish Rifles House, Motherwell
  - 51st Highland, 7th Battalion, The Royal Regiment of Regiment – Paired with 3 SCOTS
    - Battalion Headquarters and Headquarters Company, at Queen's Barracks, Perth
      - Highland Band of the Royal Regiment of Scotland
    - A (Black Watch (Royal Highland Regiment)) Company, in Dundee
      - Platoon, at Gordon Barracks, Aberdeen
      - Lovat Scouts Platoon, in Kirkcaldy
    - C (Highlanders (Seaforth, Camerons, and Gordons)) Company, in Inverness
      - Platoon, in Stornoway, Isle of Lewis
      - Platoon, in Elgin
    - D (Argyll and Sutherland Highlanders (Princess Louise's)) Company, Dumbarton
      - Platoon, Stirling
- The Princess of Wales's Royal Regiment (Queen's and Royal Hampshires)
  - 3rd Battalion, The Princess of Wales's Royal Regiment – Paired with 1 PWRR
    - Battalion Headquarters and Headquarters Company, at Leros Barracks, Canterbury
      - Band of the Princess of Wales's Royal Regiment
    - A Company, at MoD Manston, Manston
      - 2 Platoon, at Rowcroft Barracks, Ashford
    - B (Royal Sussex) Company, at Quebec Barracks, Brighton
      - 4 Platoon, at Carter Barracks, Eastbourne
    - C (Royal West Kent) Company, in Rochester
  - 4th Battalion, The Princess of Wales's Royal Regiment – Paired with 1 R ANGLIAN
    - Battalion Headquarters and Headquarters Company, in Redhill
    - A (Queen's Royal Surreys) Company, in Farnham
    - B Company, in Edgware
      - Machine gun Platoon, in Hornsey, London
    - C Company, in Cosham, Portsmouth
      - 9 Platoon, in Southampton – formerly 9 (Isle of Wight) Platoon
    - D (Royal Sussex) Company, in Crawley
- The Duke of Lancaster's Regiment (King's, Lancashire and Border)
  - 4th Battalion, The Duke of Lancaster's Own Regiment – Paired with 1 LANCS
    - Battalion Headquarters and Headquarters Company, at Kimberley Barracks, Preston
    - A (King's Regiment) Company, in Liverpool
      - Band of the Duke of Lancaster's Regiment
    - B (Queen's Lancashire Regiment) Company, at Somme Barracks, Blackburn
      - Platoon, in Blackpool
    - C (King's Own Royal Border Regiment) Company, in Barrow-in-Furness
      - Platoon, in Workington
      - Platoon, at Carlisle Castle
    - D (Queen's Lancashire Regiment) Company, in Manchester
- The Royal Regiment of Fusiliers
  - 5th Battalion, The Royal Regiment of Fusiliers – Armoured Infantry paired with 1 RRF
    - Battalion Headquarters and Headquarters Company, at Anzio House, Newcastle upon Tyne
      - Band of the Royal Regiment of Fusiliers
    - A (Fusiliers) Company, in Birmingham
    - C (City of London Fusiliers) Company, at Fusilier House, Balham, London
    - X Company, at Anzio House, Newcastle upon Tyne
    - Z Company, at Anzio House, Newcastle upon Tyne
- The Royal Anglian Regiment
  - 3rd Battalion, The Royal Anglian Regiment – Paired with 2 R ANGLIAN
    - Battalion Headquarters, at Blenheim Camp, Bury Saint Edmunds
    - No. 1 (Norfolk and Suffolk) Company, in Norwich
      - Platoon, in Lowestoft
    - No. 2 (Leicestershire and Northamptonshire) Company, in Leicester
      - Platoon, in Corby
    - No. 3 (Essex and Hertfordshire) Company, in Chelmsford
      - Platoon, in Hitchin
    - No. 4 (Lincolnshire) Company, at Westward House, Grimsby
      - Platoon, at Sobraon Barracks, Lincoln
    - No. 5 (Suffolk and Cambridgeshire) Company, at Blenheim Camp, Bury Saint Edmunds – HQ Company
      - Band of the Royal Anglian Regiment, in Peterborough
      - Platoon, in Peterborough
- The Royal Yorkshire Regiment (14th/15th, 19th and 33rd/76th Foot)
  - 4th Battalion, The Yorkshire Regiment – Paired with 2 YORKS
    - Battalion Headquarters and Headquarters (Helmand) Company, at Worsley Barracks, York
    - A (Alma) Company, at Halifax Barracks, Kingston upon Hull
      - Platoon, at Wolfe Armoury, Beverley
    - B (Burma) Company, at Fontenay Barracks, Barnsley
      - Platoon, in Sheffield
    - C (Corunna) Company, in Huddersfield
      - Band of the Yorkshire Regiment
      - Platoon, at Harewood Barracks, Leeds
      - Platoon, at Belle Vue Barracks, Bradford
    - D (Quebec) Company, in Middlesbrough
      - Platoon, at Somme Barracks, Catterick Garrison
- The Mercian Regiment (Cheshire, Worcesters and Foresters, and Staffords)
  - 4th Battalion, The Mercian Regiment – Armoured Infantry paired with 1 MERCIAN
    - Battalion Headquarters and Headquarters Company, at Wolseley House, Birmingham
      - Rifle Platoon, in Dancox House, Worcester
      - Javelin Platoon, in Kidderminster
    - B Company, at Ubique Barracks, Widnes
      - Rifle Platoon, in Ellesmere Port
      - Mortar Platoon, in Stockport
    - C Company, at Nottingham
      - Assault Pioneer Platoon, in Mansfield
    - D (Staffords) Company, in Stoke-on-Trent
      - Machine Gun Platoon, in Burton upon Trent
- The Royal Welsh
  - 3rd Battalion, The Royal Welsh – Armoured Infantry paired with 1 R WELSH
    - Battalion Headquarters and Headquarters Company, at Maindy Barracks, Cardiff
      - Band and Corps of Drums of the Royal Welsh, at Raglan Barracks, Newport
    - B (Royal Regiment of Wales) Company, in Swansea
      - Platoon, in Aberystwyth
    - C (Royal Regiment of Wales) Company, in Pontypridd
      - Platoon, at Bethesda Street drill hall, Merthyr Tydfil – new
    - D (Royal Welch Fusiliers) Company, in Colwyn Bay
      - Platoon, in Caernarfon
- The Royal Irish Regiment (27th (Inniskilling), 83rd, 87th and Ulster Defence Regiment)
  - 2nd Battalion, The Royal Irish Regiment – Paired with 1 R IRISH
    - Battalion Headquarters and Headquarters Company, at Thiepval Barracks, Lisburn
      - Band of the Royal Irish Regiment, in Holywood
    - A (Royal Ulster Rifles) Company, in Belfast
    - B (Royal Ulster Rifles) Company, in Newtownabbey
      - Platoon, at Lowfield Camp, Ballymena
    - C (Royal Irish Fusiliers) Company, in Portadown
      - Platoon, in Enniskillen
- The Parachute Regiment
  - 4th Battalion, The Parachute Regiment
    - Battalion Headquarters and Headquarters Company, at Thornbury Barracks, Pudsey
    - A (Scottish Volunteers) Company, in Glasgow
      - Platoon, in Edinburgh
    - B Company, in White City, London
      - Platoon, at The Barracks, Croydon
      - Platoon, in Romford, London
    - C Company, at Thornbury Barracks, Pudsey
      - 7 Rifle Platoon, at Chapman House, Hebburn
      - Platoon, at Altcar Training Camp, Saint Helens
    - D Company, at Seabroke House, Rugby
      - Platoon, in Lenton, Nottingham
      - Platoon, at Raglan Barracks, Newport
- The Rifles
  - 6th Battalion, The Rifles – Paired with 1 RIFLES
    - Battalion Headquarters, at Wyvern Barracks, Exeter
    - Headquarters Company, at Wyvern Barracks, Exeter
      - Salamanca Band and Bugles of The Rifles
      - Platoon, at Fortescue Lines, Barnstaple
      - Platoon, in Paignton
    - A (Gloucestershire) Company, in Gloucester
      - 3 Platoon, at HMS Flying Fox, Bristol
      - Platoon, in Hereford
    - C (Devonshire and Dorset) Company, in Dorchester
      - Platoon, in Poole
    - D (Cornwall Light Infantry) Company, in Truro
      - Platoon, at Millbay Docks, Plymouth
  - 7th Battalion, The Rifles – Armoured Infantry paired with 5 RIFLES
    - Battalion Headquarters, at Iverna Gardens drill hall, Kensington
    - Headquarters Company, at Brock Barracks, Reading
      - Waterloo Band and Bugles of the Rifles, at Edward Brooks Barracks, Abingdon-on-Thames
    - A Company, at Edward Brooks Barracks, Abingdon-on-Thames
      - 2 Platoon, at Youens House, High Wycombe
      - Javelin Platoon, at Viney House, Aylesbury
    - B Company, in Swindon
      - 6 (Bulford) Platoon, at Ward Barracks, Bulford Camp
    - C Company, at Brock Barracks, Reading
    - G Company, in West Ham, London
      - Platoon, in Mile End, London
      - Platoon in Kensington, London (collocated with BHQ)
  - 8th Battalion, The Rifles – paired with 2 RIFLES
    - Battalion Headquarters, Bishop Auckland
    - Headquarters Company, in Bishop Auckland
      - Assault Pioneer Platoon, in Sunderland
    - D (Rifles) Company, in Gilesgate
      - 2 Platoon, in Sunderland
    - E (Rifles) Company, in Shrewsbury
      - 5 Platoon, in Sparkbrook, Birmingham
    - Y (Rifles) Company, in Pontefract
      - 8 Platoon, in Doncaster

== Special Air Service ==
The Special Air Service is organized as follows.

- 21st Special Air Service Regiment (Artists)
  - Regimental Headquarters and Headquarters Squadron, (Regent's Park)
  - A Squadron (Regent's Park)
  - C Squadron (Basingstoke/Cambridge)
  - E Squadron (Newport/Exeter)
- 23rd Special Air Service Regiment
  - Regimental Headquarters and Headquarters Squadron, Birmingham
  - B Squadron, York/Kingston upon Hull
  - D Squadron, Scotland
  - G Squadron, Newcastle upon Tyne/Liverpool

== Army Air Corps ==
The Army Air Corps is organized as follows.

- 6th Regiment Army Air Corps
  - Regimental Headquarters, at Middle Wallop Flying Station
  - Headquarters Squadron, at Wattisham Airfield, Ipswich
  - No. 675 (The Rifles) Squadron, in Taunton
    - Yeovil Flight, at Salvation Army Hall, Yeovil
  - No. 677 (Suffolk and Norfolk Yeomanry) Squadron, at Blenheim Camp, Bury Saint Edmunds
    - B Flight, in Norwich
    - C Flight, at Wattisham Airfield, Ipswich
  - No. 679 (The Duke of Connaught's) Squadron, at Duke of Connaught Barracks, Portsmouth
    - Middle Wallop Flight, at Middle Wallop, Stockbridge

== Royal Logistic Corps ==
The Royal Logistic Corps is organized as follows.

- 150th (Yorkshire) Transport Regiment – Paired with 6 Regiment RLC
  - Regimental Headquarters and 523 Headquarters Squadron, at Londesborough Barracks, Kingston upon Hull
    - Regimental Band of 150 Regiment RLC
  - 216 (Tyne Tees) Transport Squadron, at New Cliffords Fort, Tynemouth
  - 217 (Yorkshire) Transport Squadron, at Harewood Barracks, Leeds
  - 218 (East Riding) Transport Squadron, in Kingston upon Hull
  - 219 (West Riding) Transport Squadron, at Scarbrough Barracks, Doncaster
- 151st (Greater London) Transport Regiment – Paired with 10 Queen's Own Gurkha Logistic Regiment
  - Regimental Headquarters and 508 Headquarters Squadron, in Croydon
  - 124 Transport Squadron, in Warley
    - B Troop, in Maidstone
  - 210 Transport Squadron, at Princess Royal House, Sutton, London
  - 240 (Hertfordshire) Transport in Barnet, London
  - 562 Transport Squadron, in Southall
    - G Troop, at Gale Barracks, Aldershot Garrison
- 152nd (North Irish) Regiment RLC – Paired with 9 Logistic Regiment
  - Regimental Headquarters, at Palace Barracks, Holywood
  - 277 (Belfast) Headquarters Squadron, at Palace Barracks, Holywood
  - 211 (Londonderry) Tanker Squadron, in Derry
    - C (Coleraine) Troop, in Coleraine
  - 220 (Belfast) Tanker Squadron, at Palace Barracks, Holywood
  - 400 (Belfast) Petroleum Squadron, at Palace Barracks, Holywood
- 154th (Scottish) Regiment RLC – Paired with 27 Regiment RLC
  - Regimental Headquarters and 527 (Fife) Headquarters Squadron, at Bruce House, Dunfermline
  - 221 (Glasgow) Transport Squadron, in Glasgow
  - 230 (Edinburgh) Transport Squadron, in Edinburgh
  - 239 (Fife) Transport Squadron, at Bruce House, Dunfermline
  - 251 (Ayrshire) Transport Squadron, in Irvine
- 156th (North West) Supply Regiment RLC
  - Regimental Headquarters and 235 Headquarters Squadron, in Liverpool
  - 234 (Wirral) Supply Squadron, in Oxton
  - 236 (Manchester) Supply Squadron, in Salford, Manchester
  - 238 (Sefton) Supply Squadron, in Bootle
  - 381 (Lancaster) Supply Squadron, at Alexandra Barracks, Lancaster
- 157th (Welsh) Regiment RLC – Paired with 4 Regiment RLC and 10 Queen's Own Gurkha Logistic Regiment
  - Regimental Headquarters and 249 Headquarters Squadron, at Maindy Barracks, Cardiff
  - 223 (South Wales) Transport Squadron, at The Grange, Swansea
  - 224 (Pembroke Yeomanry) Transport Squadron, at Picton Barracks, Carmarthen
    - A Troop, in Haverfordwest
  - 398 (Flintshire and Denbighshire Yeomanry) Transport Squadron, in Queensferry
  - 580 (Royal Regiment of Wales) Transport Squadron, at Maindy Barracks, Cardiff
- 158th (Royal Anglian) Transport Regiment – Paired with 7 Regiment RLC
  - Regimental Headquarters and Headquarters Squadron, in Peterborough
  - 160 (Lincoln) Transport Squadron, at Sobraon Barracks, Lincoln
  - 201 (Bedford) Transport Squadron, in Bedford
    - Detached Troop, in Luton
  - 202 (Ipswich) Transport Squadron, in Ipswich
    - M Troop, in Colchester
  - 203 Transport Squadron, in Loughborough – 203 Sqn has no lineage with the Leicestershire and Derbyshire Yeomanry (its immediate predecessor) and therefore does not maintain its subtitle.
- 159th (West Midlands) Support Regiment RLC – Paired with 6 Regiment RLC
  - Regimental Headquarters and 243 Headquarters Squadron, in Coventry
  - 123 Supply Squadron, in Telford
  - 125 Supply Squadron, in Stoke-on-Trent
    - B Troop, in Burton upon Trent
  - 237 (Midlands) Supply Squadron, in West Bromwich
    - B Troop, Kings Heath, Birmingham
  - 294 (Grantham) Supply Squadron, at Prince William of Gloucester Barracks, Grantham
- 162nd Movements Control Regiment – paired with 29 Regiment RLC
  - Regimental Headquarters and 279 Headquarters Squadron, in Nottingham
  - 280 Movement Control Squadron, in Swindon
  - 281 Movement Control Squadron, in Nottingham
  - 282 Movement Control Squadron, at Hollis VC Armoury, Coulby Newham, Middlesbrough
  - 871 Postal and Courier Squadron, at Youens House, High Wycombe
  - 883 Postal and Courier Squadron, in Hartlepool
- 165th (Wessex) Port and Maritime Regiment – paired with 17 Port and Maritime Regiment RLC
  - Regimental Headquarters and 264 Headquarters Squadron, in Derriford
  - 142 (Queen's Own Oxfordshire Hussars) Vehicle Squadron, in Banbury
  - 232 Port Squadron, in Bodmin
  - 265 Port Squadron, in Derriford
  - 266 (Princess Beatrice's) Port Squadron, in Southampton
  - 710 (Royal Buckinghamshire Hussars) Operational Hygiene Squadron, at Viney House, Aylesbury
- 167th Catering Support Regiment, at Prince William of Gloucester Barracks, Grantham
  - Regimental Headquarters
  - 111 Catering Support Squadron
  - 112 Catering Support Squadron
  - 113 Catering Support Squadron
- 2nd Operational Support Group, at Prince William of Gloucester Barracks, Grantham
  - 500 Communications Troop
  - 487 Operational Support Unit
  - 499 Contract Management Unit
  - 498 Labour Support Unit
- 383 Commando Petroleum Troop, in Plymouth

== Royal Army Medical Service ==
The Royal Army Medical Service is organized as follows.

- Medical Operational Headquarters Support Group, at Queen Elizabeth Barracks, Strensall
- 16 Medical Regiment (Regular)
  - 144 (Parachute) Medical Squadron, in Hornsey, London
    - Glasgow Detachment, in Glasgow
    - Cardiff Detachment, in Cardiff
    - Nottingham Detachment, in Lenton, Nottingham
- 214 (North East) Multi-Role Medical Regiment
  - 201 Hospital Squadron, in Newcastle
  - 251 Medical Squadron, in Sunderland
  - 212 Hospital Squadron, in Sheffield
  - 250 Support Squadron, in Norton
- 202 (Midlands) Multi-Role Medical Regiment
  - Regimental Headquarters, in Birmingham
  - Comprises a regimental headquarters and four squadrons, located in Leicester, Nottingham and two in Birmingham.
- 203 (Welsh) Multi-Role Medical Regiment
  - Regimental Headquarters, in Llandaff, Cardiff
  - A Detachment, in Swansea
  - B Detachment, in Cwrt y Gollen
    - South Detachment, in Llandaff, Cardiff
  - C Detachment, in Bodelwyddan
    - East Detachment, in Wrexham
- 215 (Scottish) Multi-Role Medical Regiment
  - Regimental Headquarters, in Glasgow
  - Support Squadron – Glasgow, Hospital Squadron – Aberseen & Glasgow, Medical Squadron – Glenrothes, Sub units Edinburgh, Inverness & Dundee.
- 206 (North West) Multi-Role Medical Regiment
  - Regimental Headquarters, in Liverpool
  - Sub-units in Stockport, Bury, Stretford, Ellesmere Port, Blackpool, Lancaster
- 243 (Wessex) Multi-Role Medical Regiment
  - Regimental Headquarters, in Keynsham
  - A Detachment, in Keynsham
    - Detachment, in Gloucester
  - B Detachment, at Wyvern Barracks, Exeter
  - C Detachment, in Plymouth
    - Detachment, in Truro
  - D Detachment, in Portsmouth
- 210 (North Irish) Multi-Role Medical Regiment
  - Regimental Headquarters, in Belfast
- 254 (East of England) Multi-Role Medical Regiment
  - Regimental Headquarters, in Cambridge
  - 161 Medical Squadron, in Colchester
  - 162 Medical Squadron, in Hitchin
  - 163 Support Squadron, in Cambridge
- 256 (City of London and South East) Multi-Role Medical Regiment
  - Regimental Headquarters, in Walworth, London
  - A Detachment, in Walworth, London
  - B Detachment, in Kensington, London
  - C Detachment, in Kingston upon Thames, London
  - D Detachment, in Brighton
- 306 Hospital Support Regiment, at Queen Elizabeth Barracks, Strensall
- 335 Medical Evacuation Regiment, at Queen Elizabeth Barracks, Strensall

== Corps of Royal Electrical and Mechanical Engineers ==
The Corps of Royal Electrical and Mechanical Engineers is organized as follows.

- 101 Theatre Support Battalion
  - Battalion Headquarters, in Bristol
  - 127 Theatre Support Company, in Manchester
    - Detached Platoon, in Liverpool
  - 158 Theatre Support Company, in Bristol
    - 130 Detached Platoon, at Wyvern Barracks, Exeter
  - 159 Theatre Support Company, at Gordon House, Walsall
    - Detached Platoon, in Telford
    - Detached Platoon, in Swindon
  - 160 Theatre Support Company, in Bridgend
    - Detached Platoon, in Gloucester
- 102 Force Support Battalion
  - Battalion Headquarters, in Newton Aycliffe
  - 124 (Tyne Electrical Engineers) Force Support Company, in Newton Aycliffe
    - B Platoon, in Newcastle upon Tyne
  - 146 Force Support Company, at Budd VC Barracks, Scunthorpe
    - Vehicle Platoon, at McKay VC Barracks, Rotherham
    - 147 Detached Platoon, in Kingston upon Hull
  - 153 Force Support Company, in East Kilbride, Glasgow
    - B Platoon, in Grangemouth
  - 157 Force Support Company, in Holywood
    - Vehicle Platoon, at Thiepval Barracks, Lisburn
- 103 Force Support Battalion
  - Battalion Headquarters, in Northampton
  - 118 Force Support Company, in Northampton
    - 126 Detached Platoon, at Westfield House, Coventry
  - 128 Divisional Support Company, in Portsmouth
  - 133 (Kent) Recovery Company, at Rowcroft Barracks, Ashford
    - Detached Platoon, at The Barracks, Croydon
  - 148 Divisional Support Company, in Derby
    - Detached Platoon, in Nottingham
  - 169 Platoon, in Barnet, London

== Adjutant General's Corps ==
The Adjutant General's Corps is organized as follows.

- Central Volunteer Headquarters, Adjutant General's Corps, Educational and Training Services Branch Specialist Pool, at Sir John Moore Barracks, Winchester
- Central Volunteer Headquarters, Adjutant General's Corps, Staff and Personnel Support Specialist Pool, at Sir John Moore Barracks, Winchester
- Royal Military Police
  - 1st Regiment (Regular)
    - 116 Provost Company, in Cannock/Gorton
    - 243 Provost Company, in Livingston/Stockton on Tees
  - 3rd Regiment (Regular)
    - 253 (London) Provost Company, in Tulse Hill
- Military Provost Staff
  - Military Provost Staff Regiment (Regular), at the Berechurch Hall Camp, Colchester Garrison
    - Military Provost Staff Reserve Company, at Colchester Garrison

== Intelligence Corps ==
Following the Army 2020 Refine, the Intelligence Corps' reserve component was slightly expanded by formation of the 6th and 7th MI Btns, in addition to 6 new companies.

- Specialist Group Military Intelligence, Hermitage – Administrative control of 3 MI Btn
- 3 Military Intelligence Battalion – Paired with 1 MI Btn
  - Battalion Headquarters and Headquarters Company, London
  - 31 Military Intelligence Company, London
  - 32 Military Intelligence Company, Cambridge
  - 33 Military Intelligence Company, Hampstead
  - 34 Military Intelligence Company, Hampstead
  - 35 Military Intelligence Company, London
- 5 Military Intelligence Battalion – Paired with 1 MI Btn
  - Battalion Headquarters and Headquarters Company, Edinburgh
  - 51 Military Intelligence Company, Edinburgh/Glasgow
  - 52 Military Intelligence Company, Newcastle upon Tyne
  - 53 Military Intelligence Company, Leeds
  - 54 Military Intelligence Company, Bristol
  - 55 Military Intelligence Company, Nottingham
- 6 Military Intelligence Battalion – Paired with 2 MI Btn
  - Battalion Headquarters and Headquarters Company, Manchester
  - 61 Military Intelligence Company, Manchester
  - 62 Military Intelligence Company, Lisburn
  - 63 Military Intelligence Company, Stourbridge/Bletchley
- 7 Military Intelligence Battalion – Paired with 4 MI Btn
  - Battalion Headquarters and Headquarters Company, Bristol
  - 71 Military Intelligence Company, Bristol/Cardiff
  - 72 Military Intelligence Company, Southampton/Exeter
  - 73 Military Intelligence Company, Hermitage

== University Officer Training Corps ==
University Officer Training Corps (UOTC) are University Service Units that form part of the Army Reserve, and consist of 15 Units and 2 Officer Training Regiments, recruiting exclusively from University's. The UOTCs are in Group B of the Army Reserve, as such are not deployable or liable for "calling-out".

- North West Officers' Training Regiment
  - Regimental Headquarters, Manchester
  - Manchester and Salford UOTC, Manchester
  - Liverpool UOTC, Liverpool
    - Liverpool UOTC, Lancaster Detachment, Lancaster
- Yorkshire Officers' Training Regiment
  - Regimental Headquarters, Leeds
  - Leeds UOTC, Leeds
    - Leeds UOTC, York Detachment, York
  - Sheffield UOTC, Sheffield
- Wales UOTC
  - Headquarters, Cardiff
  - Wales UOTC, Cardiff Detachment, Cardiff
  - Wales UOTC, Aberystwyth Detachment, Aberystwyth
  - Wales UOTC, Bangor Detachment, Caernarfon
  - Wales, UOTC Swansea Detachment, Swansea
  - Wales UOTC, Wrexham Detachment, Wrexham
- Tayforth UOTC
  - Tayforth UOTC, A (St Andrews) Squadron, St Andrews
  - Tayforth UOTC, B (Dundee) Squadron, Dundee
  - Tayforth UOTC, C (Stirling) Company, Stirling
- Southampton UOTC
  - Southampton UOTC, Southampton
  - Southampton UOTC, Brighton Detachment, Brighton
- Cambridge UOTC
  - Cambridge UOTC, Cambridge
  - Cambridge UOTC, East Anglia Detachment, Norwich
- London UOTC
  - London UOTC, London
  - London UOTC, Canterbury Detachment, Canterbury
- Aberdeen UOTC, Aberdeen
- Queen's UOTC, Belfast
- Birmingham UOTC, Birmingham
- Oxford UOTC, Oxford
- Bristol UOTC, Bristol
- East Midlands UOTC, Nottingham
- Edinburgh UOTC, Edinburgh
- Exeter UOTC, Exeter
- Glasgow and Strathclyde UOTC, Glasgow
- Northumbrian UOTC, Newcastle

== See also ==
- Structure of the British Army
- Army 2020 Refine
- Army Reserve (United Kingdom)
