= Watchman (mascot) =

Military mascot of the now disbanded Staffordshire Regiment

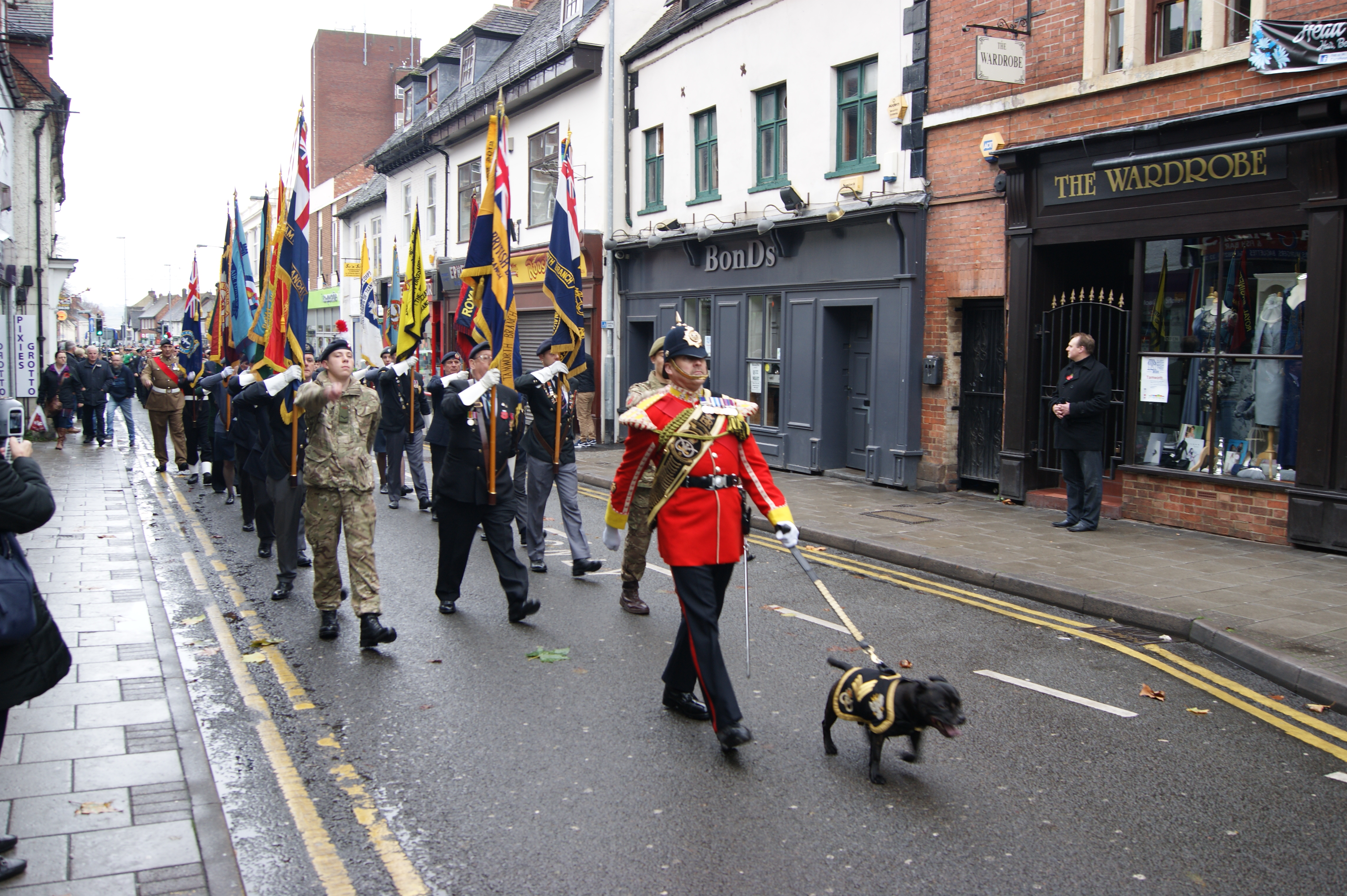
Watchman V leading Remembrance Day ceremony in Tamworth, Staffordshire (2015)

Watchman, a Staffordshire Bull Terrier, is a military mascot of the now disbanded Staffordshire Regiment. He continues his duties as part of the Staffordshire Regimental Association. The same name has been given to a succession of Staffordshire Bull Terriers – as of 2018, six.

== Background ==
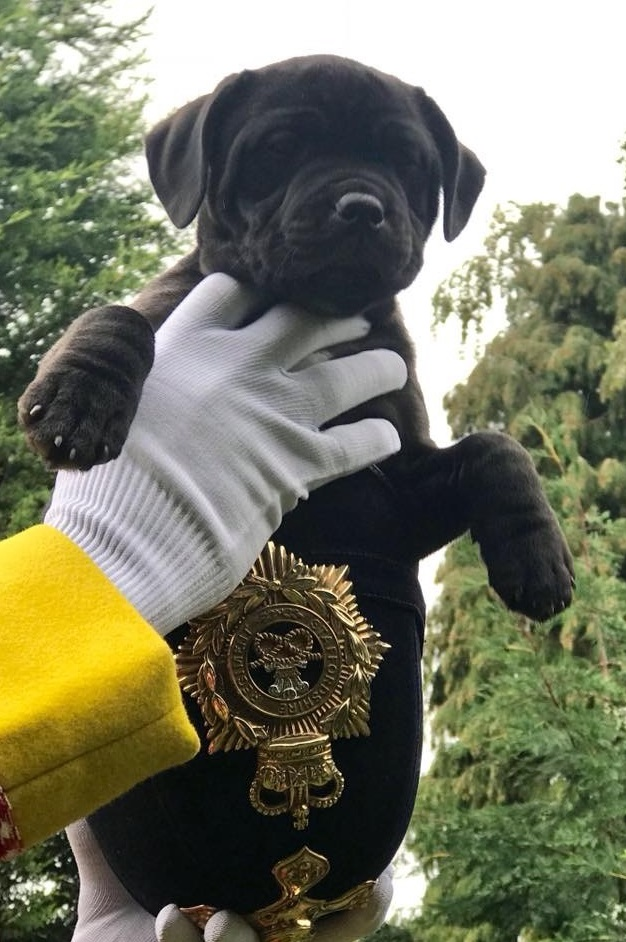
Watchman VI. A similar image is taken of each new Watchman.

Watchman is gifted by the people of Burton-on-Trent to the Staffordshire Regimental Association, previously the Staffordshire Regiment. Previously, dogs also paraded with the West Midlands Regiment and related reserve regiments. The mascots' family line comes from Cannock, in Staffordshire.

The Regiments of Staffordshire have had a Staffordshire Bull Terrier 'type' as their mascot since 1882. The Watchman name is a more recent addition to the tradition, started after the Second World War. There have been five Watchman since 1949, the current mascot is LCpl Watchman VI, who took up his duties on 5 March 2019.

Watchman has been a popular mascot of the Staffordshire Regiment and has attracted much public interest. The mascot holds the Freedom of many Staffordshire towns (or boroughs) including Tamworth and Newcastle-under-Lyme boroughs. Each successive mascot carries the name Watchman. When a mascot dies or a handler retires, another Staffordshire Bull Terrier puppy is chosen to replace him. When a Watchman passes away, they are buried with full military honours in St Edwards Square in Burton upon Trent, Staffordshire.

Since the Staffordshire Regiment was disbanded and merged into the Mercian Regiment in 2007, he started carrying out his duties as mascot to the Staffordshire Regimental Association and the Staffordshire Regiment Museum. To maintain the link with the Mercian Regiment Watchman would also join the 3rd Battalion The Mercian Regiment (STAFFORDS) at public events and parades.

Watchman is classified as a regimental pet and was not recognised by the Army or the Mercian Regiment. Since he is an unofficial mascot, his upkeep is paid for by the Staffordshire Regimental Association, not by the government or Mercian Regiment. Watchman attends events featuring the Staffordshire Regimental Association, where he has been invited by the parade organisers, or where he has been granted Freedom of the town or village. However, he also attends many public events, military ceremonies and regimental funerals in his own right.

== History ==
The tradition of the Regiments of Staffordshire having a Staffordshire Bull Terrier as a mascot started in the 19th century. In 1882 The South Staffordshire Regiment received orders to march with Lord Wolseley to the relief of General Gordon, under siege in Khartoum. The Regiment boarded trains in Cairo with their Staffordshire Bull Terrier, "Boxer". However, as the train began to move the startled Boxer leaped to the tracks and was last seen by the men lying dead or unconscious. The regiment reached Assiut where they waited several days for orders for the final phase of their march, at which point Boxer staggered into the camp looking very thin and exhausted. He collapsed at the men's feet, having walked over 200 miles through the desert along the rail tracks to get back to his regiment. It was then that the regiment adopted the tradition of a Bull Terrier as a mascot. After the Second World War, the tradition began of giving the mascot the name "Watchman".

=== Watchman I ===
The first Watchman was presented to the 6th Battalion the North Staffordshire Regiment in 1949. They received their new mascot for being the highest recruited infantry battalion in the Territorial Army. Watchman I was all white.

Watchman began his duties and accompanied the regiment to the Royal Tournament in Olympia on 25 May 1949. Watchman I showed little interest in the event until the band and drums struck up and began playing. Upon hearing this Watchman I raised his head and began to march to wide public applause.

Over the next ten years of service, Watchman I took part in every parade with the battalion. He was presented to Her Majesty The Queen during a royal visit to Burton-on-Trent on 28 March 1957.

Watchman I died in 1959 and was buried in King Edward Square Burton-on-Trent, the future burial ground of Watchman II, III and IV.

=== Watchman II ===
The popular public affection for Watchman I, along with the established tradition, interest and popular feeling of the people of Burton towards him resulted in Watchman II being presented to the Regiment in September 1960. Watchman II was a gift from the town of Burton upon Trent at a civic parade.

Watchman II marched at the head of the battalion for the next six years. He was presented to Her Majesty The Queen on the occasion of the Presentation of New Colours to the 6th North Stafford's and 5th South Stafford's, and a Guidon to the Staffordshire Yeomanry at Molineaux in the early 1960s.

Watchman II took part in the Honorary Colonels Parade held at St Martins Camp in 1966, which was to be his last parade.

In 1967 the County Territorial Army Regiments were reformed. This meant Watchman II went into retirement until his death in 1974, aged fourteen years old. He was buried alongside Watchman I in St Edwards Square, with a commemorative plaque placed onsite.

=== Watchman III ===
Following the death of Watchman II, the regimental family felt that the time honored tradition mascot should continue. After a search to find a dog of the correct pedigree the town of Burton upon Trent again presented the Regiment with a new mascot, Watchman III, in 1988. Watchman III went on to serve until his death 1998. He was buried alongside Watchman I and Watchman II in St Edwards Square, Burton upon Trent.

=== Watchman IV ===
Watchman IV was presented to the Staffordshire Regiment in August 1998. He was a gift from the Friends of the Staffordshire Regiment. Watchman IV paraded with the 1st Battalion of the Staffordshire Regiment and the West Midlands Regiment. His handler was Sgt Malcom Bower.

Watchman IV appeared at remembrance day parades in London and the Service of Remembrance outside Westminster Abbey. At this event he was introduced to HM The Queen. He participated in the Tercentenary Celebration in 2005 and Watchman IV was again introduced to HM The Queen at the Stafford's 800th anniversary celebrations in 2006.

Watchman IV attracted such attention when his handler took him for a walk through the streets of London. A coach full of tourists pulled up and leapt off the vehicle to photograph him.

Watchman IV was carried forward when the Battalion joined the Mercian Regiment on 1 September 2007 and became the mascot of the 3rd Battalion The Mercian Regiment (STAFFORDS). He retired on 4 October 2009 after 10 years of military service. He was replaced by a young Staffordshire Bull Terrier named Watchman V, in a ceremony at the Staffordshire Regiment Museum in Whittington, on 5 October 2010.

Watchman IV was buried with full military honours in St Edwards Square in Burton upon Trent on 5 December 2013. He rests along previous Watchman I, II and III.

=== Watchman V ===
Watchman V took over duties on 5 October 2009. He carried out his duties as part of the 3rd Battalion (STAFFORDS) of the Mercian Regiment, until it was withdrawn in 2013. He then took out duties as part of the Staffordshire Regimental Association. Watchman V's handler is Greg Hedges. Due to the widespread use of social media, he has become the biggest profile Watchman to date, amassing nearly 20,000 followers on Facebook.

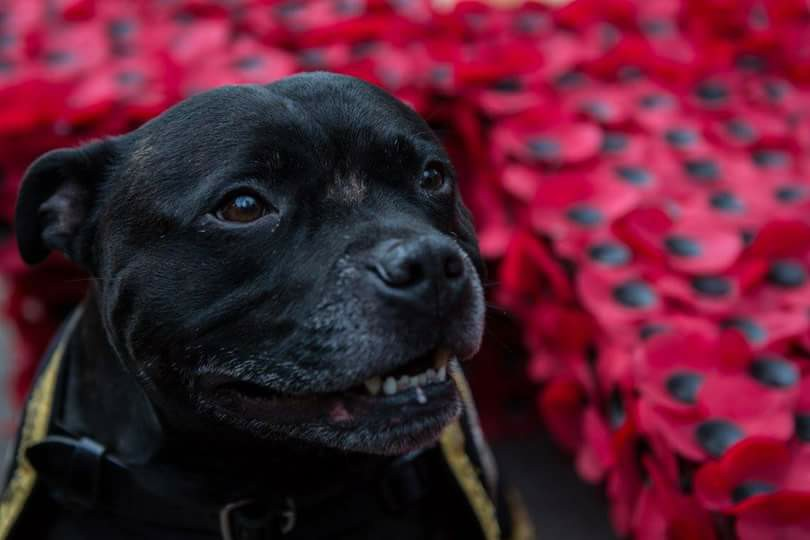
Sgt Watchman V at the Field of Remembrance, Westminster Abbey, Thursday 10 November 2016.

He attends regimental events, military parades, remembrance ceremonies and national events such as the Garden of Remembrance at Westminster Abbey. Watchman V has been presented to HRH Prince Harry at the Garden of Remembrance in Westminster Abbey. He has also been introduced several times to HRH Prince Philip at the Garden of Remembrance in Westminster Abbey. He proved to be a very popular mascot and was awarded Freedom of numerous villages and several towns in Staffordshire, most notably Tamworth Borough in 2014 and Newcastle-under-Lyme Borough in 2016. He also holds the Freedom of Uttoxeter, Heath Hayes and Wilmblebury, and Hednesford. As part of the Regimental Association he also holds freedom of many other places such as Cannock, and Hanley, in Stoke-on-Trent.

The granting of Freedom to Watchman and his handler by several major towns in Staffordshire was part of a campaign by Staffordshire politicians, led by Cllr Robert Pritchard of Tamworth Borough Council, to ensure the Watchman tradition continues, now the 3rd Battalion of the Mercian Regiment (STAFFORDS) had been withdrawn and the Staffordshire Regiment has been disbanded. Such was the pride and affection for Watchman, the Staffordshire civic community wanted to ensure he could continue to parade with the Mercian Regiment in their own towns, as he is not their official mascot.

In 2016 Watchman was entered into the "Westminster Dog of the Year" competition by Staffordshire MPs It was the first time a military mascot has been entered into the competition. The MPs organised a public campaign to help Watchman V win the public vote element of the competition. The final was held in Victoria Tower Gardens on Thursday 8 September. Sgt Watchman V won the public vote in the competition and was crowned the 2016 competitions "paw-blic" vote winner.

In October 2016 Watchman V's handler, Greg Hedges, was shortlisted for the Express & Star "Big Thank You" awards in the Ambassador of the year category. The winner, chosen by a public vote, was announced in February 2017. Watchman won his category.

At the Field of Remembrance ceremony held at Westminster Abbey on 10 November 2016, Watchman was introduced to HRH Prince Harry and HRH Prince Philip. Watchman and his handler also featured in the Royal British Legion's Festival of Remembrance event, broadcast on BBC1, broadcast on Saturday 12 November. This was on a section covering the experiences of soldiers from the Staffordshire Regiment in the 1st Gulf War. Watchman V held the rank of Colour Sergeant. He was promoted to sergeant as part of the 2015 St Georges Day celebration held in Tamworth Castle Grounds and Colour sergeant on 21 December 2017 at the Kings Head Pub in Lichfield, as part of the Ferozeshah day celebrations.

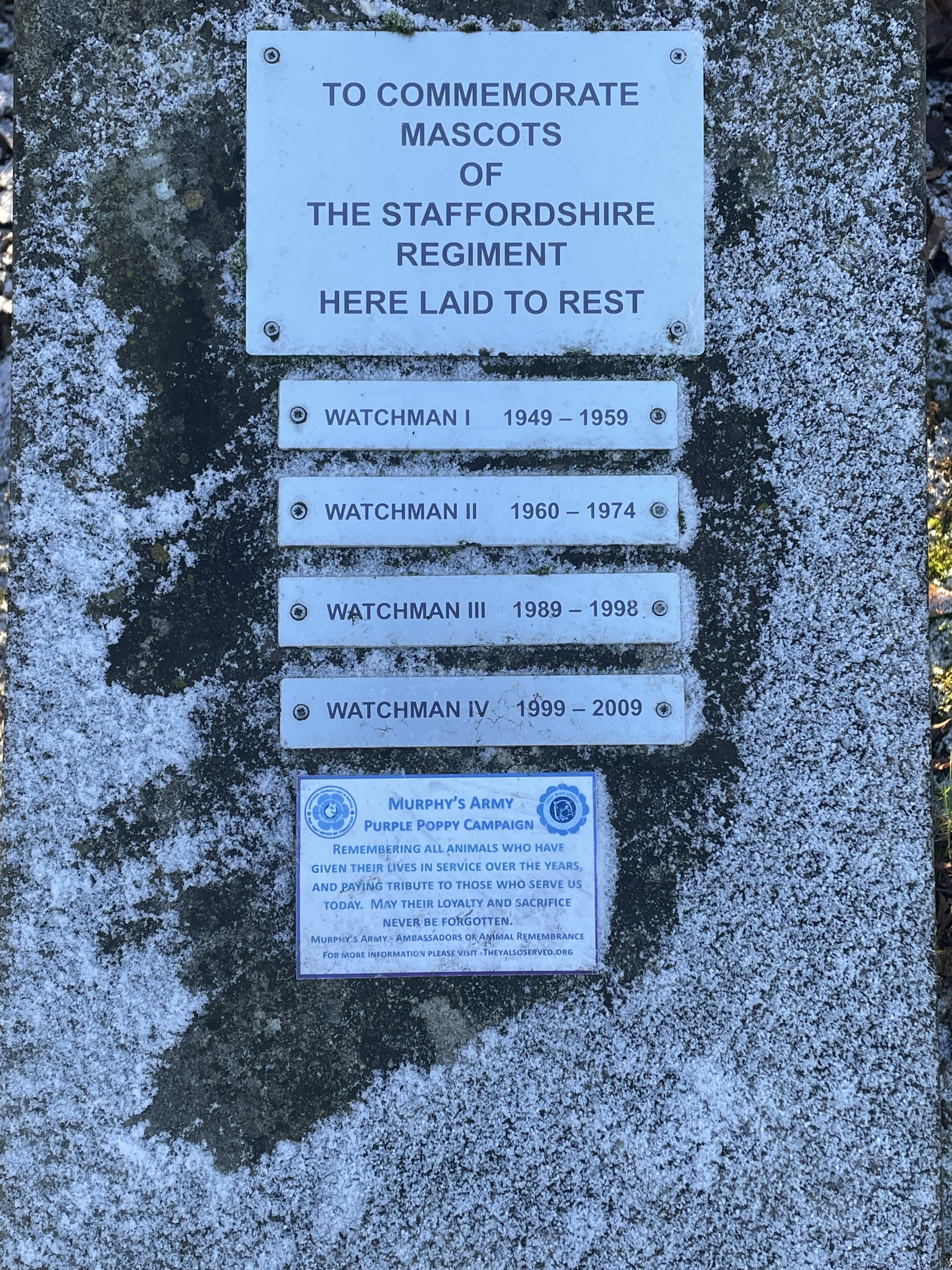

A project has been launched to build a life-size bronze statue as a tribute to the Watchman, their handlers and the Staffordshire Regimental family. Watchman also has a Facebook page, Twitter and website. Watchman V formally semi-retired on 5 March due to ill health and most of his role was taken over by Watchman VI. Watchman V lives with his handler and Watchman VI, he is frequently featured on his social media pages with Watchman VI and also attends some events and parades.

Watchman V was buried with full military honours in St Edwards Square in Burton upon Trent on 31 January 2022 Alongside Watchman I, II, III, IV.

=== Watchman VI ===
Watchman VI was presented to the regimental association in September 2018. He is a cousin of Watchman V and took over most duties from his predecessor on 5 March 2019. He was promoted to Lance Corporal on 5 March 2020 st Swynnerton Training Camp by the Lord Lieutenant of Staffordshire Ian Dudson and consort Jane Dudson.
