= 3rd (Volunteer) Battalion, Cheshire Regiment =

British Army Territorial Army battalion of the Cold War

3rd (Volunteer) Battalion, Cheshire Regiment B Company, 4 MERCIAN
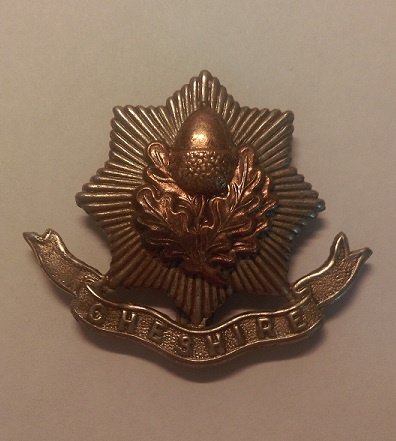
- Cap badge of the Cheshire Regiment
- Active: 1988 – Present
- Country: United Kingdom
- Branch: British Army
- Type: Infantry
- Size: Battalion
- Part of: 42nd (North West) Infantry Brigade (Cold War)
- Battalion HQ: Runcorn, Cheshire
- Nickname: Reporting name: 3 CHESHIRE

The 3rd (Volunteer) Battalion, Cheshire Regiment (3 CHESHIRE) was a part-time infantry battalion based in Cheshire, England and tasked with home defence during its tenure. The battalion was formed in the latter part of the Cold War, but later disbanded forming two companies in the new local Territorial Army (TA) regiment, the King's and Cheshire Regiment. Today, the battalion's lineage is continued in Mortar Platoon, B Company, 4th Battalion, Mercian Regiment.

== Formation ==
Following the 1983 Defence White Paper, the remaining 'Volunteer Regiments' formed in 1967 and 1971 – 1975, as a result of the reorganisation of the Territorial Army (TA), with the exception of the Yorkshire Volunteers and Wessex Regiment, were disbanded. The former regiments were split, with their companies distributing form new TA battalions being formed in the regular infantry regiments. Therefore, on 5 April 1988 the 3rd (Volunteer) Battalion, Cheshire Regiment was formed from two companies of the Mercian Volunteers, along with three new companies formed in 1986.

The new battalion's structure was as follows:

- Battalion Headquarters, in Runcorn
- Headquarters Company, in Runcorn (formed in 1986)
- A Company, in Stockport (by redesignation of A (Cheshire) Coy, 1 MERCIAN) — (successor to 7th Battalion, Cheshire Regiment)
- B Company, in Macclesfield (formed in 1986)
- C Company, in Ellesmere Port (by redesignation of C Coy, 2 MERCIAN) — (successor to 4th/7th (Territorial) Battalion, Cheshire Regiment)
- D Company, in Crewe with a platoon in Northwich (formed in 1986)
- E (Home Service Force) Company, in Runcorn

As part of the battalion's NATO commitment, in the event of mobilisation and war with the Warsaw Pact, the battalion would move to West Germany and became the communications defence unit for Commander Communications, BAOR.

== Reductions ==
In 1992, as part of the Options for Change reform announced following the Dissolution of the Soviet Union, the battalion was reduced to a three company order of battle, thereby bringing it in-line with the Regular's infantry battalions. Therefore, as part of the reductions, on 1 April 1993; B Company in Macclesfield was disbanded, while battalion headquarters and headquarters company were moved to Chester.

On 1 April 1995, as part of the minor Front Line First reform, the battalion was converted to a Fire Support Battalion and the new companies used battle honours for designations. Salerno Company was in Stockport by redesignation of A Coy, with the MILAN platoon in Macclesfield, while Gaza Company was in Crewe with its mortar platoon in Ellesmere Port and General Purpose Machine-Gun (Support Fire) (GPMG (SF)} platoon in Northwich by amalgamation of C and D Coys.

The battalion's new structure was as follows:

- Battalion Headquarters
- Salerno Company, in Stockport (formed by redesignation of A Coy)
  - Milan (AT) Platoon, in Macclesfield
- Gaza Company, in Crewe
  - Mortar Platoon, in Ellesmere Port (formed by amalgamation of C and D Coys)
  - GPMG (SF) Platoon, in Northwich

In 1998, the TA was again reduced, this time with an emphasis on the reduction of the infantry and expansion of the armoured (yeomanry) and royal Artillery (air defence elements). As part of this reorganisation, the infantry-heavy TA was significantly reduced, especially in the area of fire support. Another change was the formation of new Territorial Army Regiments. One of the new regiments was the King's and Cheshire Regiment, which became the successor to the TA in the following counties; Greater Manchester, Merseyside, and Cheshire.

Therefore, on 1 July 1999 the battalion was disbanded with HQ Company of the 5th/8th Battalion, The King's Regiment and Salerno Coy amalgamating to form B (Cheshire) Company in Warrington, while Salerno Coy was reduced to a platoon, as Mortar Platoon in Stockport. At the same time, Gaza Company was redesignated as D (Cheshire) Company based in Crewe, with its GPMG (SF) Platoon in Northwich.

== Further Lineage ==
On 1 April 2006 the King's and Cheshire Regiment was broken up, and B (Cheshire) Company became A (Cheshire) Company in the West Midlands Regiment at Peninsula Barracks, Warrington and Stockport, and D (Cheshire) Company became D (Cheshire) Company, in Crewe with the Mortar platoon in Stoke-on-Trent. On 24 August 2007, these companies transferred to the new 4th Battalion, Mercian Regiment, maintaining their location, and A Coy maintaining its subtitle '(Cheshire)'.

Under the Army 2020 programme, D (Cheshire) Coy was redesignated as D (Staffords) Coy and consolidated in Stoke-on-Trent, thereby ending the Cheshire lineage there. Under this programme, A (Cheshire) Coy was also disbanded and the Warrington, thereby ending the Cheshire lineage in the Mercian Regiment.

In 2015, a further supplement was provided to the Army 2020 programme entitled 'Army 2020 Refine', and the following occurred: new B Company was formed at Ubique Barracks, Widnes while new platoons were formed in Ellesmere Port and Stockport (Mortar Platoon). At the same time as the above changes, D (Staffords) Coy was consolidated in Staffordshire, while B Coy was consolidated in Cheshire, thereby re-linking the lineage. In addition, A Company, 4th Battalion, Duke of Lancaster's Regiment moved to Peninsula Barracks, Warrington restarting the northern lineage.
