= West Midlands Regiment =

West Midlands Regiment 4th Battalion, Mercian Regiment
- Active: 1999–present
- Allegiance: United Kingdom
- Branch: British Army
- Role: Line Infantry
- Size: One Battalion

The West Midlands Regiment was a short-lived British Territorial Army regiment from 1999 until it was re-designated as 4th Battalion, Mercian Regiment, in 2007.

== History ==
The regiment was formed in 1999 by the amalgamation of three territorial infantry battalions: 5th Battalion, Royal Regiment of Fusiliers; 5th Battalion, The Light Infantry; and 3rd Battalion, Staffordshire Regiment.

The regiment was composed of a headquarters company and five rifle companies, continuing to use the insignia of the regular regiments to which they were affiliated. Its initial structure was as follows:

- HQ Company, at Wolverhampton
- A (Fusilier) Company, at Sheldon and Coventry
  (from HQ and B Companies, 5th Battalion, Royal Regiment of Fusiliers)
- B (Worcestershire and Sherwood Foresters Regiment) Company, at Kidderminster and Worcester
  (from A Company, 5th Battalion, The Light Infantry)
- C (Staffords) Company, at Burton upon Trent
  (from C Company, 3rd Battalion, Staffordshire Regiment)
- D (Staffords) Company, at Stoke-on-Trent
  (from B Company, 3rd Battalion, Staffordshire Regiment)
- E (Light Infantry) Company, at Shrewsbury and Hereford
  (from HQ and C Companies, 5th Battalion, Light Infantry)

=== Structure prior to re-designation ===
Not long prior to re-designation of a battalion of the Mercian Regiment, the regiment absorbed the companies from other regiments that were within the new regiment's recruiting area, in order to ease the re-designation process. After this, its structure was as follows:

- HQ Company, at Wolverhampton
- A (Cheshire) Company, at Warrington and Stockport
  (from B (Cheshire) Regiment, King's and Cheshire Regiment)
- B Company, at Crewe and Stoke-on-Trent
  (from D (Cheshire) Company, King's and Cheshire Regiment)
- C (Worcestershire and Sherwood Foresters Regiment) Company, at Mansfield
  (from C (Stafford) Company, West Midlands Regiment; and D (Nottinghamshire and Derbyshire (Worcestershire and Sherwood Foresters Regiment)) Company, East of England Regiment)
- D (Staffordshire) Company, at Wolverhampton, Kidderminster, and Burton upon Trent
  (from D (Stafford) Company; and Platoon of B (Worcestershire and Sherwood Foresters Regiment) Company)
- F (Fusilier) Company, at Birmingham
  (from A (Fusilier) Company)
- L Company (Light Infantry), at Shrewsbury
  (from E (Light Infantry) Company, less Hereford Platoon to B (Shropshire Yeomanry) Squadron, Royal Mercian and Lancastrian Yeomanry)

== 4th Battalion, Mercian Regiment ==
On 1 September 2007, the regiment was re-designated as the 4th Battalion of the Mercian Regiment. It now serves as the reserve infantry battalion for Cheshire, Staffordshire, Worcestershire, West Midlands, Derbyshire, and Nottinghamshire.

=== Current structure ===
Its current structure is as follows:

- Headquarters Company, at Wolseley House, Wolverhampton
  - Rifle Platoon, at Dancox House, Worcester
  - Javelin Platoon, at Kidderminster
  - Band of the Mercian Regiment
- B Company, at Ubique Barracks, Widnes
  - Rifle Platoon, in Ellesmere Port
  - Mortar Platoon, in Stockport
- C Company, at Nottingham
  - Assault Pioneer Platoon, at Mansfield
- D (Staffords) Company, at Stoke-on-Trent
  - Machine Gun Platoon, at Burton upon Trent
