= King's and Cheshire Regiment =

- Active: 1999–2006
- Allegiance: United Kingdom
- Branch: British Army
- Role: Line Infantry
- Size: One battalion

The King's and Cheshire Regiment was a regiment of the British Territorial Army, with headquarters in Warrington, Cheshire.

== History ==
The regiment was formed in 1999 by the amalgamation of the 5th/8th (Volunteer) Battalion of the King's Regiment and the 3rd (Volunteer) Battalion, Cheshire Regiment.

The regiment was composed of four companies, continuing to wear the badges of the regular regiments to which they were affiliated:

- A (King's) Company (including the Liverpool Scottish Platoon), Liverpool - (King's)
- B (Cheshire) Company, Warrington - (Cheshire)
- C (King's) Company, Manchester - (King's)
- D (Cheshire) Company, Crewe - (Cheshire)

The first Commanding Officer was Lt Col David Richardson MBE and the first Regimental Sergeant Major was WO1(RSM) Ian Foster, both having previously been with 5/8th (Volunteer) Battalion The King's Regiment.

In July 2006 the King's Regiment companies were amalgamated with the Lancastrian and Cumbrian Volunteers to form the 4th Battalion (Volunteers), Duke of Lancaster's Regiment, and the Cheshire companies amalgamating with the West Midlands Regiment to form the 4th Battalion (Volunteers), Mercian Regiment.
