= Lancastrian and Cumbrian Volunteers =

Lancastrian and Cumbrian Volunteers 4th Battalion, Duke of Lancaster's Regiment
- Active: 1999 – present
- Allegiance: United Kingdom
- Branch: British Army
- Role: Line Infantry
- Size: One Battalion

Insignia
- Tactical Recognition Flash (1999–2006)

The Lancastrian and Cumbrian Volunteers was a Territorial Army unit of the British Army.

It was formed on 1 July 1999 following the Strategic Defence Review by the amalgamation of the 4th (Volunteer) Battalion, Queen's Lancashire Regiment and the 4th (Volunteer) Battalion, King's Own Royal Border Regiment. On 1 July 2006, the regiment was re-designated as the 4th Battalion, Duke of Lancaster's Regiment (King's, Lancashire and Border).

== History ==
=== Initial structure ===
This initial structure of the regiment, upon creation, was as follows:

- Lancastrian and Cumbrian Volunteers Regimental Headquarters, at Kimberley Barracks, Preston
  - HQ (Quebec) Company, at Kimberley Barracks, Preston
    (from HQ Company, 4th Battalion, Queen's Lancashire Regiment)
  - A (Tobruk) (King's Own Royal Border Regiment) Company, at Barrow-in-Furness and Lancaster
    (from HQ and C Companies, 4th Battalion, King's Own Royal Border Regiment)
  - B (Somme) (Queen's Lancashire Regiment) Company, at Preston and Blackpool
    (from HQ and B Companies, 4th Battalion, Queen's Lancashire Regiment)
  - C (Sicily) (King's Own Royal Border Regiment) Company, at Workington and Carlisle
    (from A and D Company, 4th Battalion, King's Own Royal Border Regiment)
  - D (Waterloo) (Queen's Lancashire Regiment) Company, at Blackburn and Bury
    (from A and C Companies, 4th Battalion, Queen's Lancashire Regiment)

=== Prior to re-designation ===
Three months prior to re-designation as a battalion of the Duke of Lancaster's Regiment, the King's Regiment companies of the King's and Cheshire Regiment were integrated into the structure of the regiment, in order to ease the process of re-designation.

- HQ Company, at Kimberley Barracks, Preston
- A (King's Regiment) Company, at Liverpool
  (from A (King's) Company, King's and Cheshire Regiment)
- B (Queen's Lancashire Regiment) Company, at Blackburn and Blackpool
  (from B and D Companies)
- C (King's Own Royal Border Regiment) Company, at Workington, Carlisle, and Barrow-in-Furness
  (from A and C Companies)
- D (King's Regiment) Company, at Ardwick Green Barracks, Manchester
  (from C (King's) Company, King's and Cheshire Regiment)

== 4th Battalion, Duke of Lancaster's Regiment ==
In July 2006, as part of Delivering Security in a Changing World, the regiment was transferred to the Duke of Lancaster's Regiment, and designated as the 4th Battalion. It now acts as the reserve infantry battalion for Merseyside, Lancashire, Greater Manchester, and Cumbria, with sub-units dispersed throughout all four counties.

=== Current Structure ===
The current battalion structure is as follows:

- Battalion Headquarters, at Kimberley Barracks, Preston
- Headquarters Company, at Kimberley Barracks, Preston
- A (Ladysmith) Company, in Liverpool
  - The Band of the Duke of Lancaster’s Regiment, also based in Liverpool
  - 3 Platoon, at Peninsula Barracks, Warrington
- B (Somme) Company, at Somme Barracks, Blackburn
  - 5 Platoon, at Kimberley Barracks, Preston
  - Rifle Platoon, at Alexandra Barracks, Lancaster
  - Mortar Platoon, in Blackpool
- C (Kohima) Company, in Workington
  - 8 Platoon, in Carlisle Castle, Carlisle
  - Assault Pioneer Platoon (Corps of Drums), in Barrow-in-Furness
    - Detachment, at Alexandra Barracks, Lancaster
- D (Inkerman) Company, in Manchester
  - Machine Gun Platoon (Fusiliers), at Castle Armoury, Bury
