= Staffordshire Regiment Museum =

The Staffordshire Regiment Museum
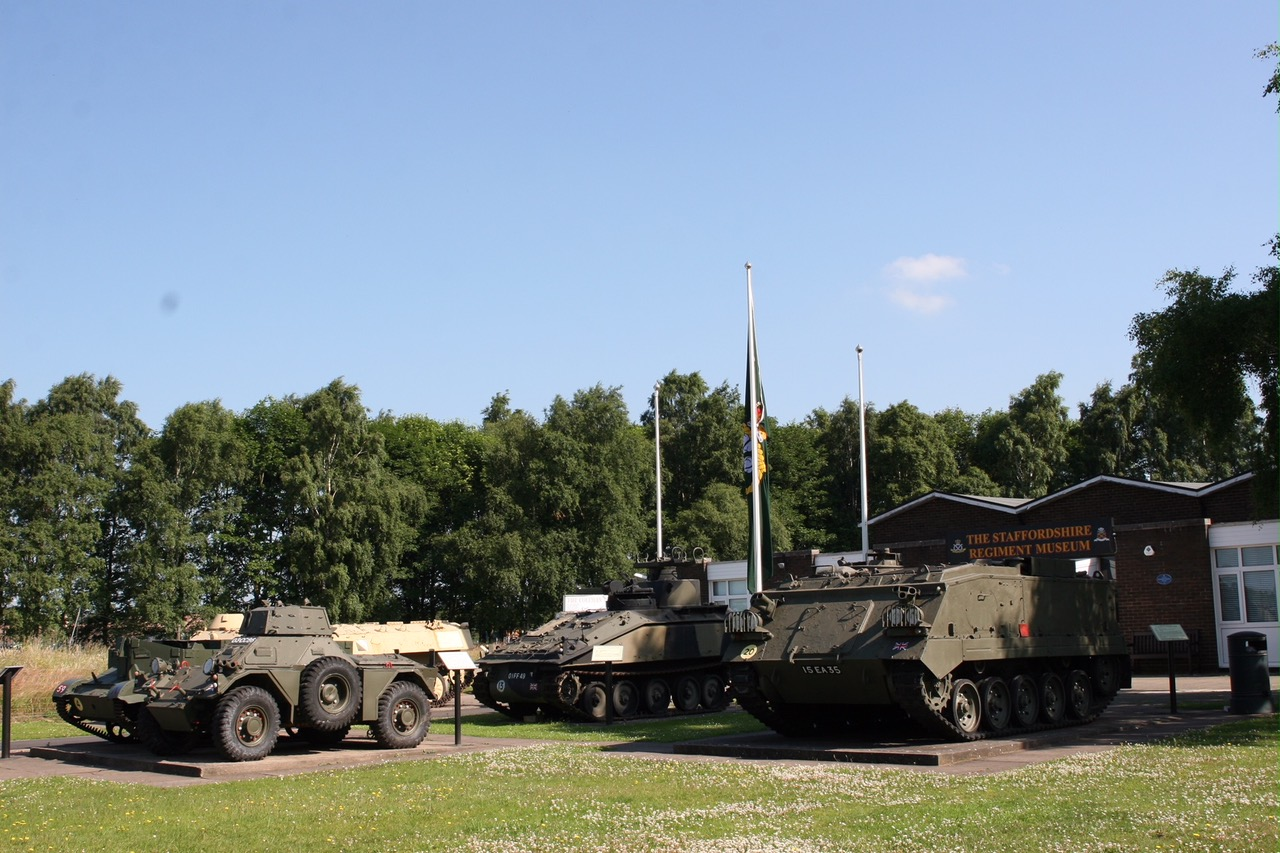
- Armoured vehicle display at the museum

- Shown in Staffordshire
- Established: 1969
- Location: Whittington Barracks, Whittington, Staffordshire
- Coordinates: 52.6596°N 1.7778°W
- Website: www.staffordshireregimentmuseum.com

The Staffordshire Regiment Museum is a military museum in Staffordshire, England, preserving the history of the Staffordshire Regiment (The Prince of Wales's), its antecedent regiments and its successor regiment, the Mercian Regiment, from 1705 to the present. The Staffordshire Regiment was an Infantry regiment of the British Army, formed in 1959 by the amalgamation of the South Staffordshire Regiment and the North Staffordshire Regiment.

The museum is adjacent to Whittington Barracks, the former home of The Staffordshire Regiment's antecedent regiments since 1881, and the current base for the Regimental Headquarters of The Mercian Regiment and the Defence Medical Services. It is located in Whittington, Staffordshire on the A51 Lichfield-Tamworth Road, 3 miles from Lichfield and 4 miles from Tamworth. The museum is 6 miles from the National Memorial Arboretum in Alrewas, Staffordshire.

== History ==
The museum was established on its present buildings in 1969, incorporating the formerly separate museums of The North Staffordshire Regiment and The South Staffordshire Regiment, both of which were founded in the 1930s.

== Exhibits ==
There are exhibits from the 38th Regiment of Foot, 64th Regiment of Foot, 80th Regiment of Foot and the 98th Regiment of Foot, their successors – the North Staffordshire Regiment and the South Staffordshire Regiment – The Staffordshire Regiment and the regiment of today (The Mercian Regiment); and also from the militia, volunteers and Territorial Army.

The main indoor exhibition is in chronological sequence with a wide selection of uniforms, weapons and associated items from campaigns in India, Burma, the Crimea, Persia, South Africa, Egypt and the Sudan, as well as from the First and Second World Wars. More recent material covers the Regiment's involvement in Northern Ireland, Cyprus, Kosovo, the Gulf Wars (Operation GRANBY and Op TELIC) and Afghanistan (Op HERRICK). The oldest item is a Grenadier Company Officer's cap of the 38th (1st Staffordshire) Regiment of Foot dating from around 1760. The medals display includes those of eight of the fourteen members of the Regiment awarded the Victoria Cross and medals from all campaigns in which the Regiment has taken part. The collection includes around 11,000 items.

The Coltman Trench, a First World War replica trench at the museum

A major exhibit is an outdoor replica of a First World War British Army defensive trench system. It is named after Lance Corporal William Harold Coltman, who was awarded a Victoria Cross whilst serving with the North Staffordshire Regiment as a stretcher-bearer. The trench is 100m long and 2m wide, it includes dug-outs and other features which are named after the other Victoria Cross holders from the Regiment in World War I.

The museum also has a number of outdoor exhibits relating to the Second World War. These include the Smart Street Shelter, which was opened in 2017. This is a recreation of a 1940s air raid shelter. The shelter is equipped with sound effects to provide an immersive experience of what it was like to experience "The Blitz".

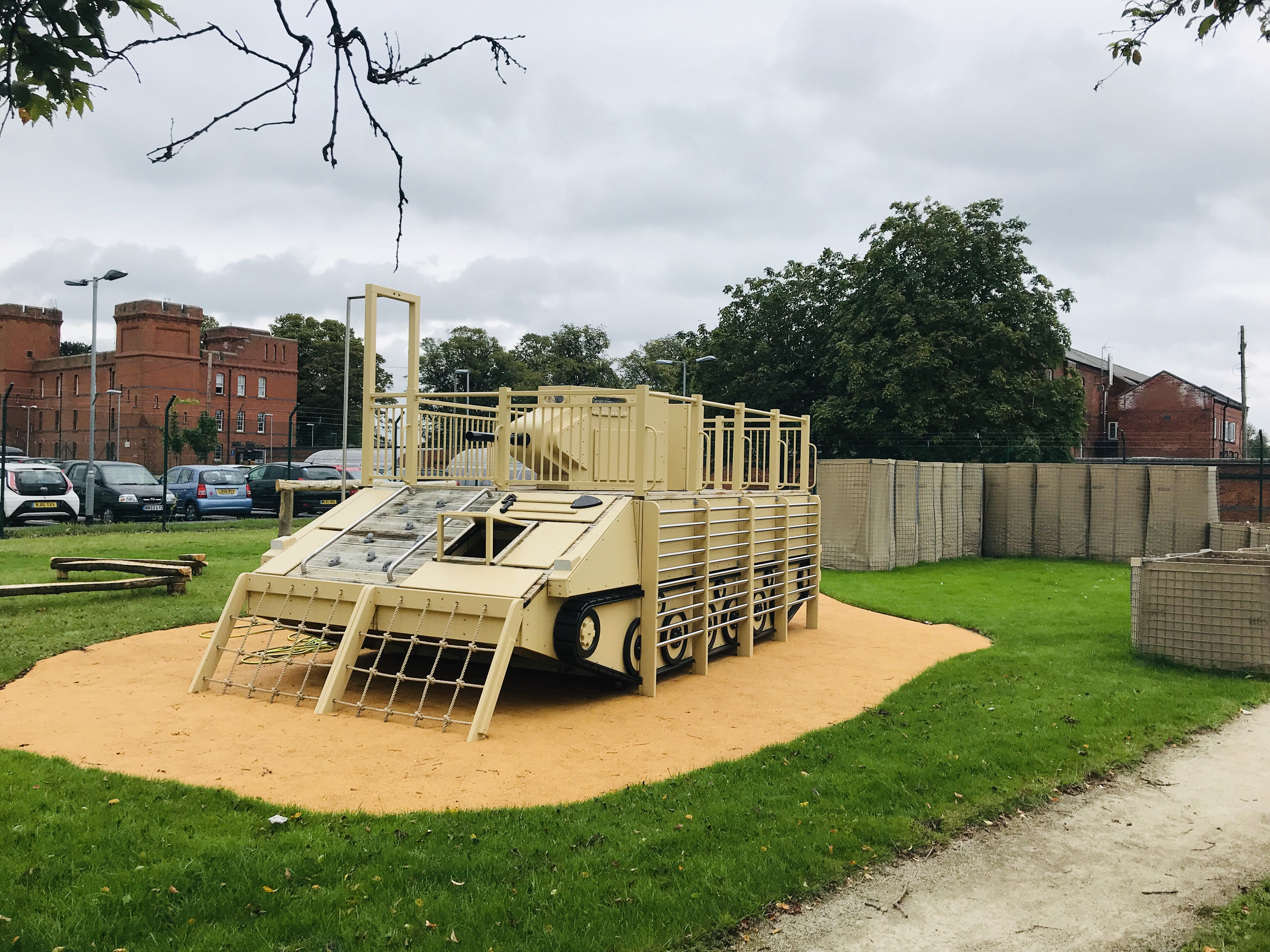
Camp Fisher, a Warrior Infantry Fighting Vehicle styled playground

The museum's other outdoor exhibits include weapons such as the ConBAT recoilless rifle and armoured fighting vehicles used or captured by the Regiment, including the FV432 Mk1, FV103 Spartan, Iraqi MT-LB, Universal Carrier (Bren Gun) T16 and Ferret armoured car.

The museum grounds also have a remembrance garden containing the original memorial to the Staffordshire Regiment from the National Memorial Arboretum. After the memorial at the National Memorial Arboretum was replaced by a new memorial, built by Staffordshire Regiment veterans, the original memorial was relocated to the museum as part of the same project. The garden was officially opened by Prince Richard, Duke of Gloucester, on 7 April 2016.

In 2019, the museum opened a military-style adventure playground. Named Camp Fisher, the centrepiece of the playground is a life-size Warrior tracked armoured vehicle play feature, set within a mock-Forward Operating Base based on the recent Afghanistan war. It is dedicated to WO2 Ian Fisher who was killed on operations in Afghanistan whilst serving with the 3rd Battalion the Mercian Regiment in 2013.

The museum is owned and managed by the Staffordshire Regiment Museum Trust which is a registered charity in England and Wales (Charity No: 1096944).

== Gallery ==
The Staffordshire Regiment's cap-badge

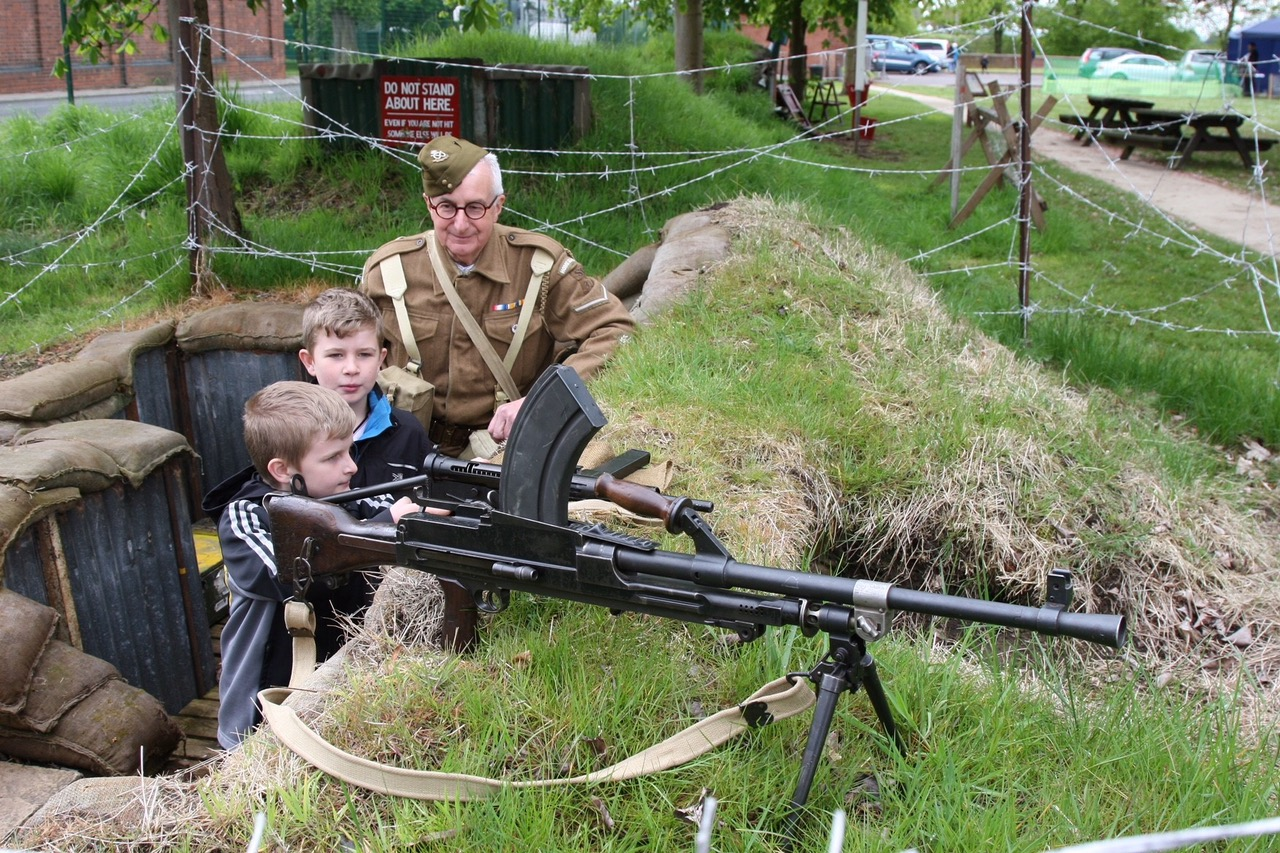
Display of weapons by a Second World War reenactor during an open day

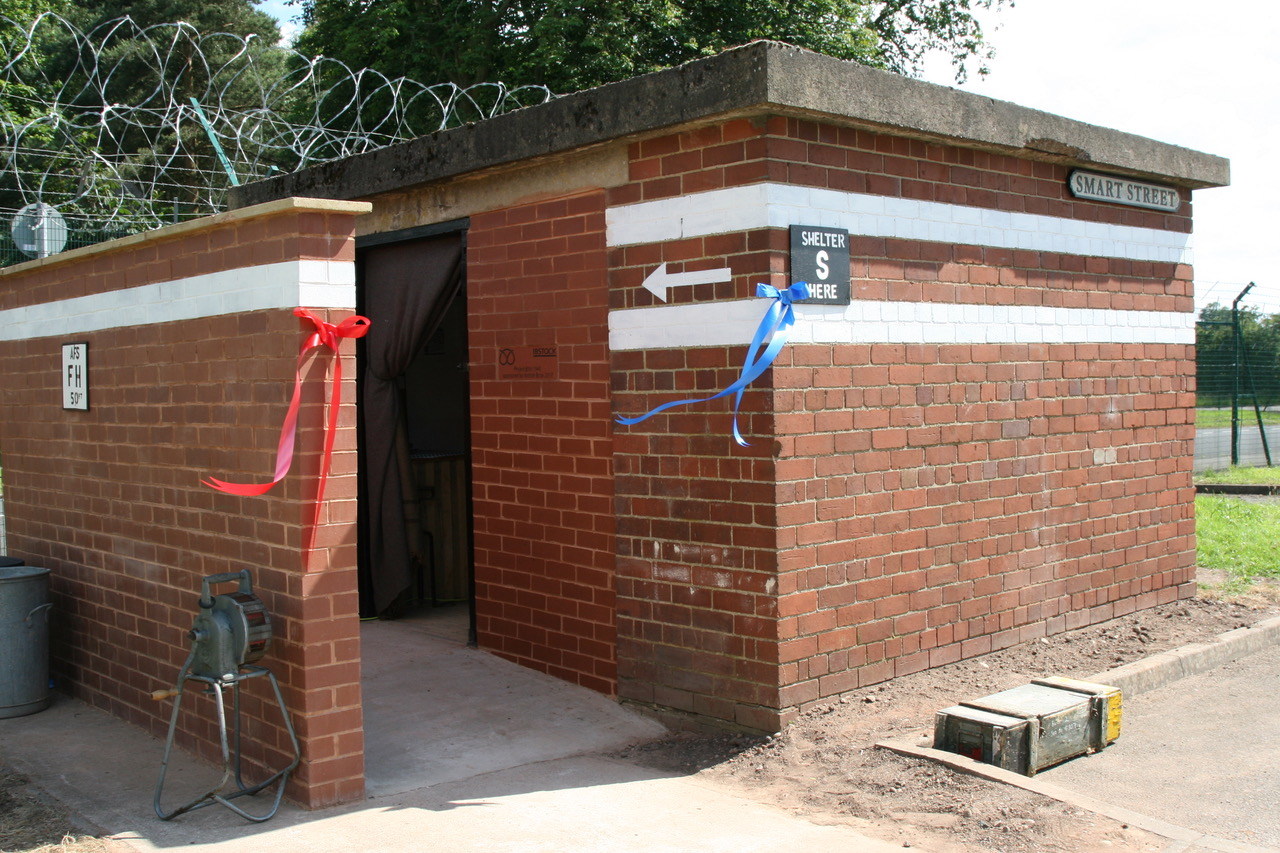
The Smart Street Shelter, a replica Second World War air-raid shelter

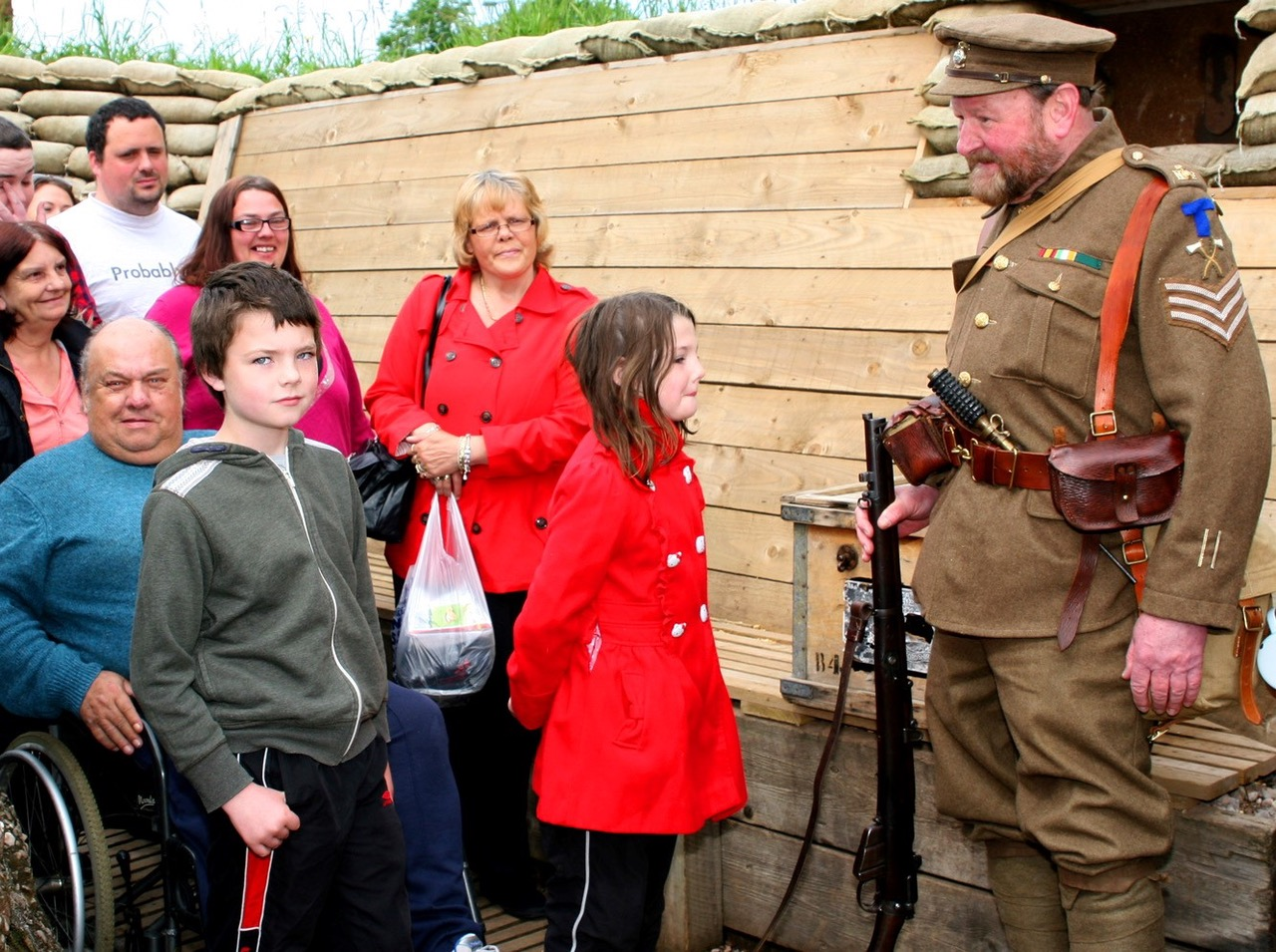
Public tour of the Coltman Trench

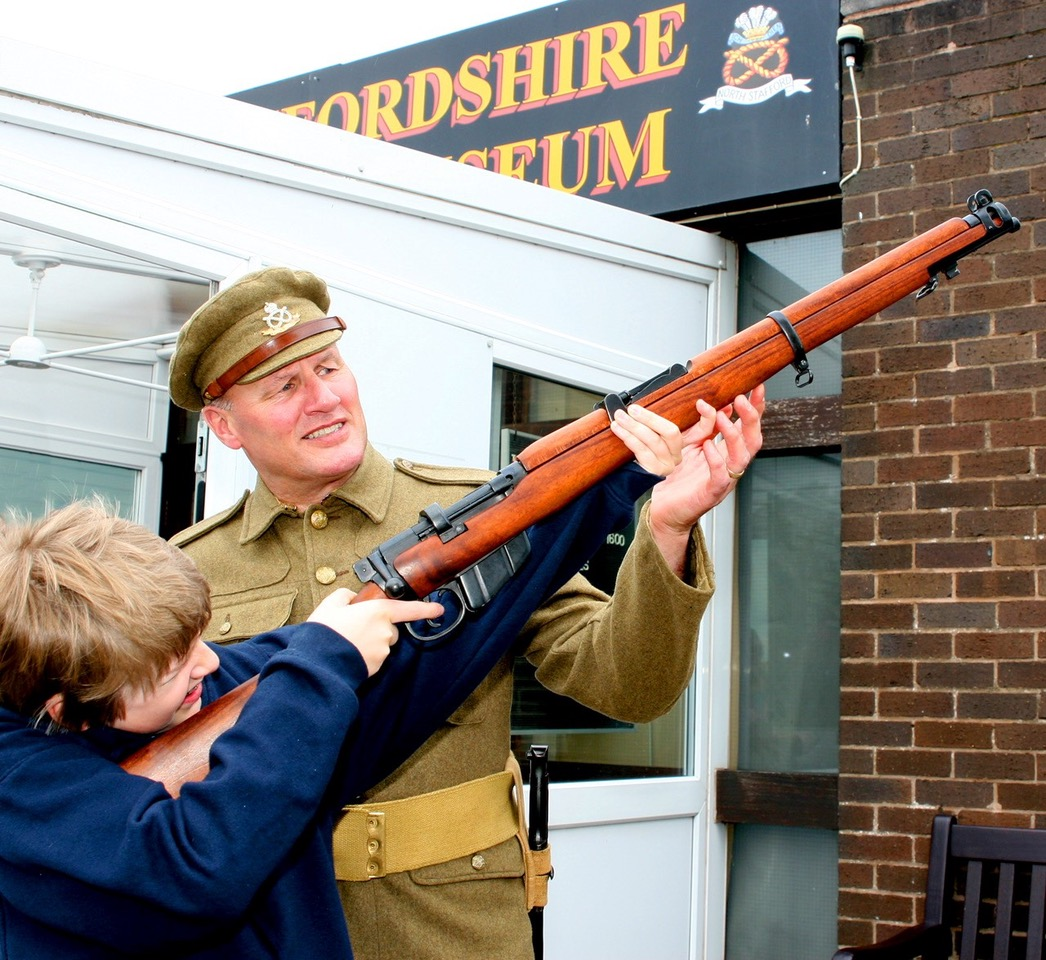
A First World War schools lesson

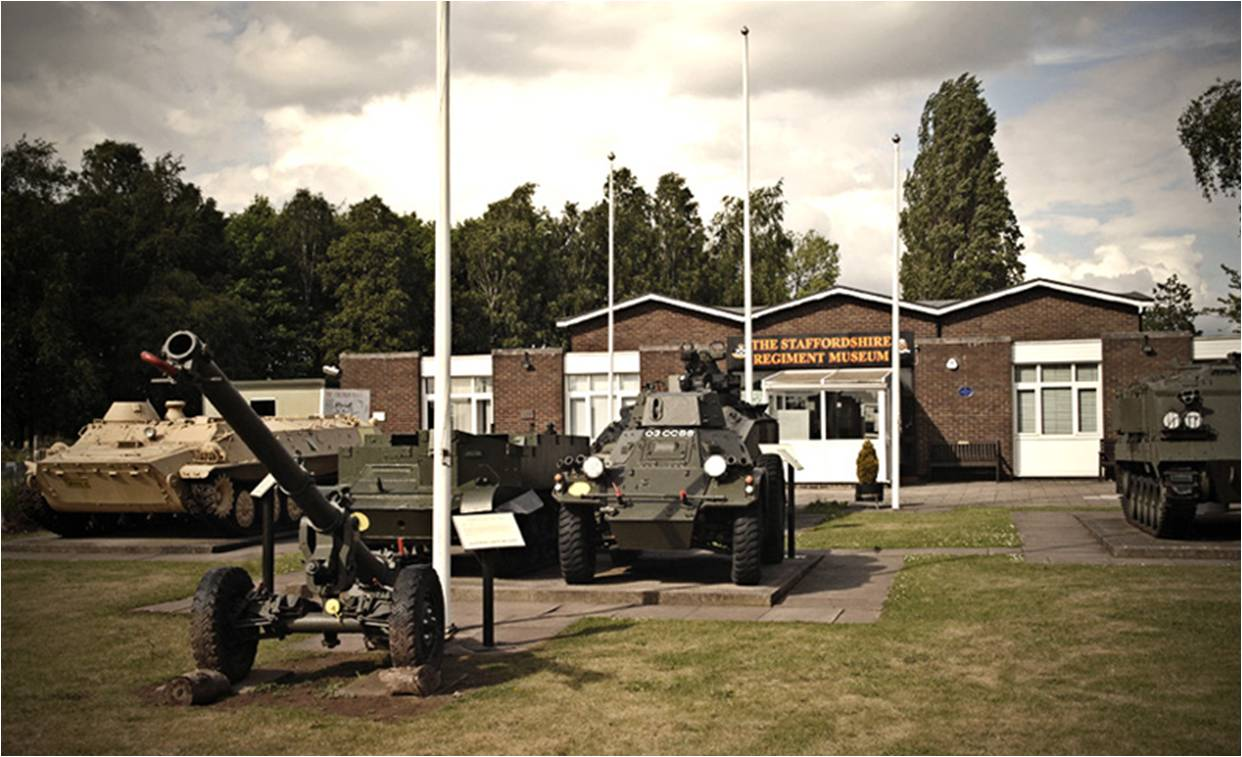
Staffordshire Regiment Museum - Exterior

== Other activities ==
The museum has an active on-site events programme, which includes historical re-enactment displays. Regular events are World War I Night in the Trenches and Carols in the Trenches. It operates an active Educational Programme which provides for curriculum-based visits to serve multi-subject Key Stage 1, 2 and 3 of the National Curriculum (England, Wales and Northern Ireland) using World War I, World War II, and Victorian era resources. An Outreach Programme exists which delivers lectures on the Regiment's history at off-site locations.

The archives (which are available for reference and detailed research) include a wide range of books and documents relating to the Regiment and a variety of source material. There is an extensive photographic collection. The majority of the museum curatorial and educational programme staff are provided by volunteers. The museum is also supported by a dedicated branch of the Friends of The Staffordshire Regiment. In 2013, the museum was awarded the Queen's Award for Voluntary Service for its educational work with school and youth groups.
