= Kimberley Barracks =

English military installation

- Preston, Lancashire
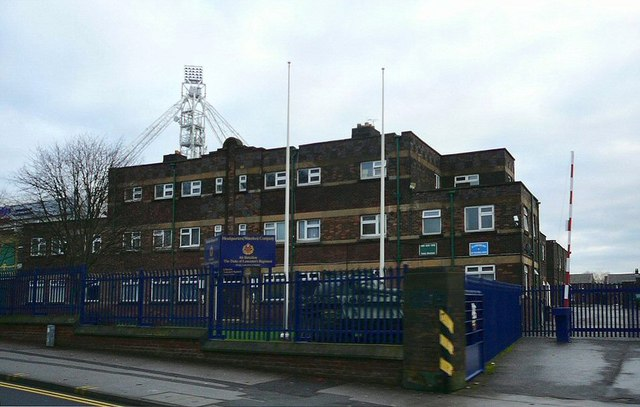
- HQ Company sign outside of Kimberley Barracks

Site information
- Type: Barracks
- Owner: Ministry of Defence
- Operator: British Army

Location
- Location within Preston
- Coordinates: 53°46′17″N 02°41′16.3″W

Garrison information
- Occupants: 4th Battalion, Duke of Lancaster's Regiment

Kimberley Barracks is a military installation on Deepdale Road in Preston in Lancashire, England PR1 6PR.

== Naming ==
The name of the barracks is based on the battle honour won by the Loyal Regiment (North Lancashire) when it was besieged by Boer forces during the Siege of Kimberley. The regiment was able to hold the town for four months and one day until the siege was lifted. The regiment was posthumously awarded the battle honour 'Defence of Kimberley'. From December 1925 the regiment maintained a formal alliance with the Kimberley Regiment, which has continued into the Duke of Lancaster's Regiment.

== History ==
The barracks were established during the Second World War and were initially used to accommodate the 5th County of Lancaster (Preston County) Battalion, Home Guard. (Note: The site is shown as open land in the 1938 ordnance survey map.)

After the reformation of the Territorial Army (TA) in 1947, the role of Kimberley Barracks expanded. Three Royal Artillery units were based here, including:

- Headquarters, 93rd (Anti-Aircraft) Army Group, Royal Artillery
  - 597th (Loyals) Light Anti-Aircraft Regiment, Royal Artillery

From 1967, a Troop from 202 Training Squadron, Royal Engineers (73 Engineer Regiment) was based at the location. This troop was disbanded in 1999 following the reorganisation of 73 Engineer Regiment.

Following the formation of the 4th (Volunteer) Battalion, Queen's Lancashire Regiment on 1 April 1975, Battalion Headquarters and Headquarters Company were based at the barracks. After the battalion's disbandment and subsequent absorption into the Lancastrian and Cumbrian Volunteers in 1999, the new regiment established its Regimental Headquarters and Headquarters (Quebec) Company at the location.

In 2004 the British Army launched an investigation over the release of a photo showing an 'Iraqi prisoner' being urinated on by Queen's Lancashire Regiment soldiers, apparently done on the premises. By 2007, D (Waterloo) (Queen's Lancashire) Company, Lancashire and Cumbrian Volunteers had its company headquarters and 2 Rifle Platoons at the barracks. In 2007, the Lancastrian and Cumbrian Volunteers became 4th (Volunteer) Battalion, Duke of Lancaster's Regiment. The Battalion HQs and HQ Company continue to be the only units based at the location to this day.

== Current units ==
Today only a small garrison of troops are located at the barracks, consisting of the following.

British Army

- Battalion Headquarters, 4th Battalion, Duke of Lancaster's Regiment (Army Reserve)
- Headquarters Company, 4th Battalion, Duke of Lancaster's Regiment (Army Reserve)
- 5 Platoon, B (Somme) Company, 4th Battalion, Duke of Lancaster's Regiment (Army Reserve)

Community Cadet Forces

- Preston Detachment, Lancashire Army Cadet Force
- 341 (City of Preston) Squadron, Cumbria and Lancashire Wing, Air Training Corps

== See also ==
- Fulwood Barracks (located just north of the barracks)
