= Southampton UOTC =

Southampton University Officer Training Corps
- Active: 1902 – Present
- Allegiance: United Kingdom
- Branch: British Army
- Type: Training
- Role: Army Officer Training
- Size: 3 Companies
- Part of: Sandhurst Group
- Locations: 32 Carlton Place, Southampton
- Mottos: Strenuis Ardua Cedunt "the heights yield to endeavour"

Commanders
- Commanding Officer: Lt Col S Ash

Insignia
- Abbreviation: SUOTC

Southampton University Officer Training Corps is a British Army reserve unit of the University Officers' Training Corps, based in the south of England.

It is formed of three sub-units: A Company for its first-year Officer Cadets, B Company for its second-year Officer Cadets, and the Leadership Development Wing. It recruits predominantly from the University of Southampton, University of Portsmouth, Bournemouth University, Solent University and the University of Winchester.

== History ==
In November 1902 twenty students from Hartley University College raised a company, sanctioned by the War Office, which formed part of the 2nd Volunteer Battalion, The Hampshire Regiment. The Company conducted Foot Drills at the College Assembly Hall and weapon training at the Carlton Place drill hall.

Following the Haldane Reforms, and the formation of the Territorial Force in 1908, the Company retained its identity as part of the 5th Battalion, The Hampshire Regiment. Upon the outbreak of the First World War, members of the company were commissioned into the 5th Battalion, and other units. The names of those that fell in action are named on the University War Memorial.

After the war, with the amalgamation of the 5th and 7th Battalions, a College Platoon was formed in 1929. On 1 October 1937, the relationship with the Hampshire Regiment discontinued, with the formation of the University College Southampton Senior OTC. Following the outbreak of the Second World War, OTCs were replaced with Senior Training Corps, member of which were part of the Home Guard. From 1948, the name was changed to the University Training Corps, with Cadets being enlisted into the Territorial Army. However, numbers fell and the University Training Corps was placed in suspended animation in April 1951.

In 1978, the University Military Education Committee asked the Ministry of Defence to consider reforming the University Training Corps, and on 1 October 1979 SUOTC was re-established in Blighmont Barracks, before returning to its original home at 32 Carlton Place in 1981.

== Uniform ==
The capbadge worn by SUOTC is taken from the heraldic arms of the University of Southampton. SUOTC have worn the arms as their capbadge since becoming an OTC in 1937.

== See also ==
- University Royal Naval Unit Solent, the Royal Navy counterpart in Portsmouth
- Southampton University Air Squadron, the Royal Air Force counterpart in Boscombe Down
