= Ubique Barracks, Widnes =

British military installation in Cheshire

Ubique Barracks
- Widnes, Cheshire

Site information
- Type: Barracks
- Owner: Ministry of Defence
- Operator: British Army

Location
- Location within Cheshire
- Coordinates: 53°22′27″N 02°43′25.8″W

Site history
- In use: 1985–Present

Garrison information
- Garrison: 4th Battalion, Mercian Regiment

Ubique Barracks, Widnes is a military installation of the British Ministry of Defence occupied by the British Army located in Widnes, Cheshire WA8 6TH, England.

== History ==
Following the reorganisation of the Territorial and Army Volunteer Reserve, a Light Air Defence Troop was formed at the (then) Territorial Army Centre, Widnes part of the also newly formed 213 (South Lancashire Artillery) Light Air Defence Battery. In 1986, following the formation of the Home Service Force (a home defence roled infantry force), a new detachment formed at the barracks part of A (Home Service Force) Battery. At this time the centre was expanded to the modern barracks.

As part of the Options for Change reform announced after the Dissolution of the Soviet Union, the Home Service Force Battery was disbanded, and the LAD troop based in Widnes reduced to the battery LAD, where it remained until 2001.

In 2001, an internal reorganisation of 103rd (Lancashire Artillery Volunteers) Regiment Royal Artillery saw the regimental Light Aid Detachment (LAD), Royal Electrical and Mechanical Engineers disperse and join each battery individually, leaving the barracks vacant.

In 2007 following the Future Army Structure programme whereas B (Cheshire) Company, 4th Battalion Mercian Regiment was based. This company was later to be disbanded by 2018, but under the Army 2020 Refine programme, the company remained at the location.

On 19 April 2018, a 'suspicious package' was notified to the Cheshire Constabulary, but this was later found to just be a false alarm.

Ubique Barracks forms part of Cheshire Garrison, a regional garrison overseeing all units based within the county of Cheshire.

== Current garrison ==
The current garrison of the barracks includes the following:

British Army

- B Company, 4th Battalion, Mercian Regiment

Community Cadet Forces

- Widnes Detachment, Cheshire Army Cadet Force
- Widnes Sea Cadets
- 310 (Widnes) Squadron, Air Training Corps
