= Staffordshire Regiment =

Staffordshire Regiment (The Prince of Wales's)
- Cap badge
- Active: 1959–2007
- Disbanded: 2007
- Country: United Kingdom
- Branch: British Army
- Type: Infantry
- Role: Armoured Infantry
- Size: One Battalion
- Part of: Prince of Wales's Division
- Nickname: The Staffords
- Colors: Black & Gold
- March: Quick – The Staffordshire Regiment; Slow – God Bless the Prince of Wales
- Mascots: Staffordshire Bull Terrier, each successive mascot called Watchman
- Anniversaries: Anzio (22 January), Ypres (31 July), Arnhem (17 September), Ferozeshah (21 December)

Commanders
- Colonel in Chief: Prince Andrew, Duke of York
- Colonel of the Regiment: Brigadier James Kenneth Tanner OBE

Insignia
- Tactical Recognition Flash
- Arm Badge: Glider; From South Staffordshire Regiment

The Staffordshire Regiment (Prince of Wales's) (or simply "Staffords" for short) was an infantry regiment of the British Army, part of the Prince of Wales's Division. The regiment was formed in 1959 by the amalgamation of the South Staffordshire Regiment and the North Staffordshire Regiment (Prince of Wales's), and in 2007 was amalgamated with the Cheshire Regiment and the Worcestershire and Sherwood Foresters Regiment to become the 3rd Battalion, Mercian Regiment.

In 2014, the 3rd Battalion, Mercian Regiment was merged with the 1st and 2nd battalions, to create the 1st and 2nd battalions, Mercian Regiment (Cheshires, Worcesters and Sherwood Foresters, and Staffords).

The mascot of the Staffordshire Regiment was a Staffordshire Bull Terrier; each successive mascot took the name Watchman. The current serving mascot is known as Private Watchman VI and he carries out his duties as part of the Staffordshire Regimental Association.

== History ==
=== Formation ===
The regiment was formed on 31 January 1959 by the amalgamation of the South Staffordshire Regiment and North Staffordshire Regiment (Prince of Wales's).

In November 1960 the regiment undertook a six-month exercise in Kenya, followed by a year in Colchester and then a return to Kenya for a further two years. On the tour the regiment had to deal with a mutiny by the Ugandan Army. Returning home, the regiment was the last unit of the British Army to serve in East Africa.

A home tour in Dover followed in 1964. Then came a two-year posting to Berlin in 1968 followed by a tour in Sharjah in the Trucial States where the regiment again recorded a 'last unit' distinction being the last unit to serve in Sharjah.

=== Northern Ireland ===
The regiment undertook a tour in Northern Ireland during the Troubles in 1972 before moving to Quebec Barracks in Osnabrück in 1973. Further tours in Northern Ireland were undertaken in 1974 and 1976. The regiment moved to Hyderabad Barracks in Colchester Garrison later in 1976 before undertaking another tour in Northern Ireland in 1979.

The regiment moved to Gibraltar in 1981 and to Roman Barracks at Colchester in 1983 before undertaking another tour in Northern Ireland in 1984. It then moved to Fallingbostel in 1986.

=== Gulf War ===
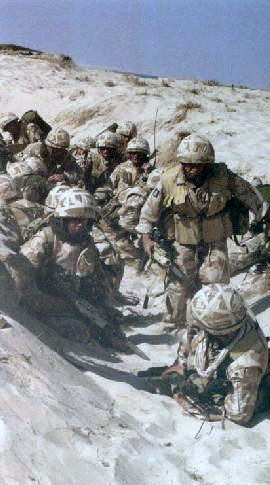
Troops from C Company, 1st Battalion, engaged in a live firing exercise during Operation Granby, 6 January 1991.

In October 1990 The Staffordshire Regiment was deployed to Saudi Arabia as part of 7th Armoured Brigade (referred to as the 'Desert Rats'). The deployment was in response to the dictator Saddam Hussein's invasion of the sovereign territory of Kuwait, claiming it to rightfully belong to Iraq.

The regiment moved to Dale Barracks in Chester in 1991, to Abercorn Barracks in Ballykinler in 1994 and Clive Barracks in Shropshire in 1996. From their base in Shropshire, the 1st Battalion deployed to Hong Kong in 1996, shortly before it was handed back to China, and also to Northern Ireland for short periods and a six-month roulement tour to Belfast in 1997.

=== Iraq War ===
The regiment moved to Mooltan Barracks in Tidworth Camp in 2000. Following a deployment to Kosovo in 2002 and a first deployment to Iraq on Operation Telic 6 in 2005. The regiment also undertook a second deployment to Iraq during Operation Telic 9 in 2006 where they led the raid on the Al Jamiat police station.

=== Amalgamation ===
As part of the reorganisation of the infantry announced in 2004, it was announced that the Staffordshire Regiment would merge with the Cheshire Regiment and the Worcestershire and Sherwood Foresters Regiment into a new four-battalion regiment to be called the Mercian Regiment. On 1 September 2007 the Staffordshire Regiment became the 3rd Battalion, Mercian Regiment.

== Structure ==
The Staffordshire Regiment was organised into the following sub-organisations and units:

- Regimental Headquarters, Staffordshire Regiment, at Whittington Barracks, Lichfield
- 1st Battalion (Regular)
- Band of the Staffordshire Regiment (Prince of Wales's), disbanded in 1994 to form Clive Band of the Prince of Wales's Division
- TAVR
  - 5th Battalion, South Staffordshire Regiment (disbanded in 1967)
  - 5th Battalion, North Staffordshire Regiment (amalgamated with 6th Bn in 1961)
  - 6th Battalion, North Staffordshire Regiment (amalgamated with 5th Bn in 1961)
  - 5th/6th Battalion, North Staffordshire Regiment (formed in 1961, disbanded in 1967)
  - 5th/6th (Territorial) Battalion, Staffordshire Regiment (formed in 1967, reduced to cadre in 1969, disbanded in 1975)
- TA
  - 3rd (Volunteer) Battalion, Staffordshire Regiment (formed in 1988, disbanded in 1999)

== Regimental museum ==
The Staffordshire Regiment Museum is based at Whittington Barracks near Lichfield.

== Battle honours ==
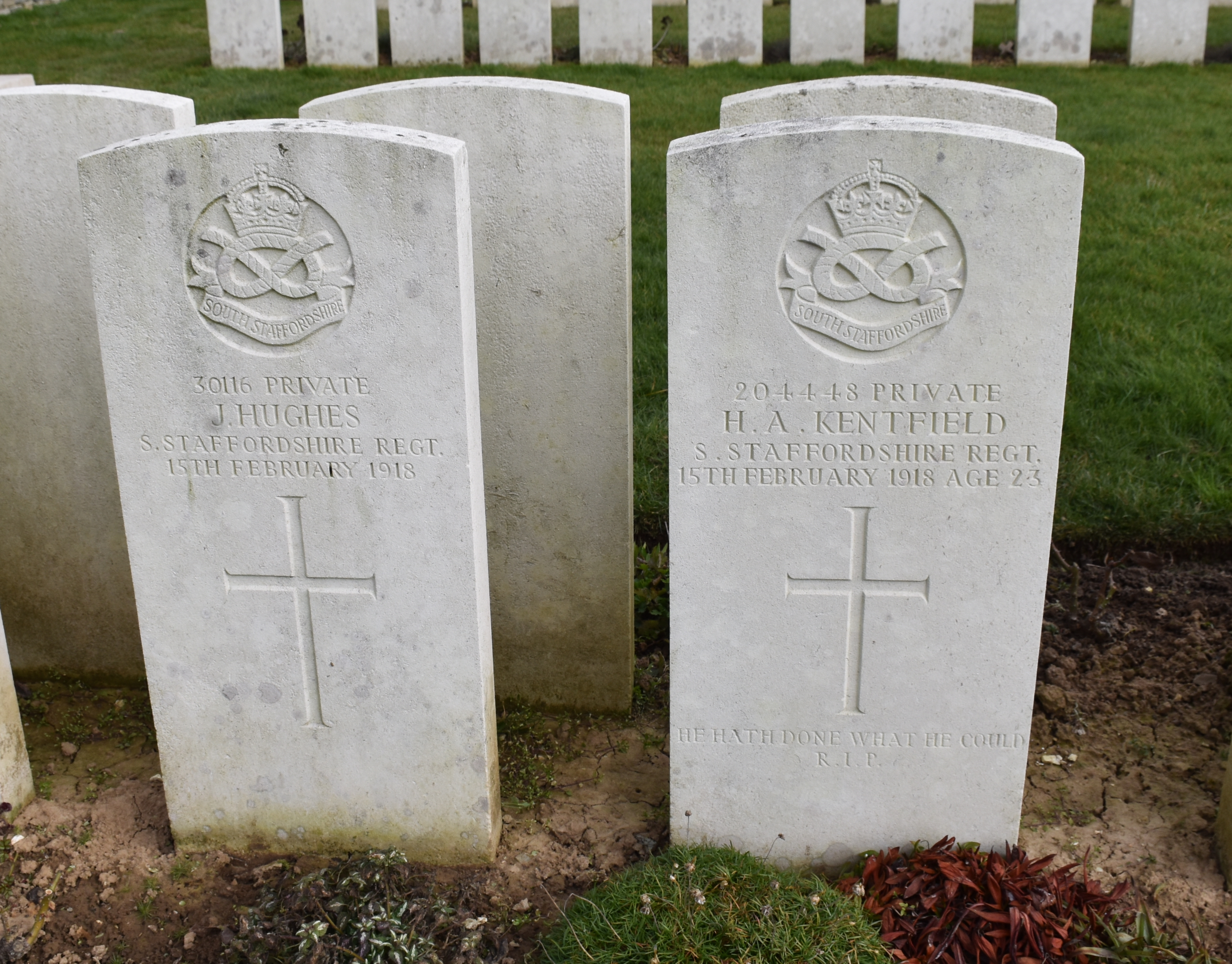
Graves of two soldiers of the South Staffordshire Regiment, killed 1918, in the Mory Abbey Military Cemetery, Pas-de-Calais, France

The regiment's battle honours are as follows:

- Pre-World War I: Guadeloupe 1759, Martinique 1794, Hafir, South Africa 1878-79, Egypt 1882, Kirbekan, Nile 1884–85, South Africa 1900–02
- World War I:
  - France and Flanders: Battle of Mons, Retreat from Mons, Marne 1914, Aisne 1914–18, Armentières 1914, Ypres 1914-17, Langemarck 1914, Gheluvelt, Nonne Bosschen, Neuve Chapelle, Aubers, Festubert 1915 Loos, Somme 1916-18, Albert 1916-18, Bazentin, Delville Wood, Battle of Pozières, Battle of Guillemont, Flers-Courcelette, Morval, Thiepval, Ancre Heights, Ancre 1916, Bapaume 1917-18, Arras 1917, Scarpe 1917, Arleux, Bullecourt, Battle of Hill 70, 1917-18, Battle of Ypres 1917-18, Battle of Pilckem, Langemarck 1917, Battle of Menin Road, Battle of Polygon Wood, Battle of Broodseinde, Poelcapelle, Passchendaele, Cambrai 1917-18, St. Quentin, Bapaume 1918, Rosières, Avre, Lys, Bailleul, Kemmel, Scherpenberg, Drocourt-Quéant, Hindenburg Line, Havrincourt, Canal du Nord, St. Quentin Canal, Beaurevoir, Kortrijk, Selle, Valenciennes, Sambre, France and Flanders 1914-18
  - Gallipoli: Suvla, Landing at Suvla, Scimitar Hill, Sari Bair, Gallipoli 1915–16
  - Mesopotamia: Egypt 1916, Tigris 1916, Kut al Amara 1917, Baghdad, Mesopotamia 1916–18
  - Italy: Piave, Vittorio Veneto 1918
  - North West Frontier India: Baku, Persia 1918, North West Frontier India 1915
- Inter-War: Afghanistan 1919
- World War II:
  - North West Europe: Dyle, Defence of the Scheldt, Battle of the Ypres-Comines Canal, Caen, Battle of Orne, Noyers, Mont Picton, Brieux Bridgehead, Falaise, Arnhem 1944, North-West Europe 1940 -1944
  - North Africa: Battle of Sidi Barrani, Djebel Kesskiss, Medjez Plain, Gueriat el Atch Ridge, Gab Gab Gap, North Africa 1943
  - Italy: Landing in Sicily, Sicily 1943, Battle of Anzio, Carroceto, Rome, Advance to Tiber, Gothic Line, Battle of Marradi, Italy 1943 and Italy 1944–45,
  - Burma: Chindits 1944, Burma 1943–44
- Post-World War II: Gulf 1991, Wadi al Batin

== Regimental Colonels ==
Colonels of the Regiment were:

- 1959–1961: Col. (Hon. Maj-Gen.) Alec Wilfred Lee, CB, MC (previously Colonel of the South Staffordshire Regiment)
- 1961–1966: Brig. Gerald Ernest Thubron, DSO, OBE
- 1966–1971: Brig. John Conway Commings, CBE
- 1971–1977: Brig. Robert Louis Hargroves, CBE
- 1977–1985: Col. Jeremy Charles Angelo Swynnerton, OBE
- 1985–1990: Lt-Gen. Sir Derek Boorman, KCB
- 1990–1995: Maj-Gen. Ian Lennox Freer, CB, CBE
- 1995–2002: Col. Timothy Richard Cottis, MBE
- 2002–2005: Brig. Simon James Knapper, CBE, MC
- 2005–2007: Col. James Kenneth Tanner, OBE
- 2007 Regiment amalgamated into the Mercian Regiment

== Alliances ==
- Canada – 4^{e} Bataillon, Royal 22^{e} Régiment (Châteauguay)
- Australia – The Royal Victoria Regiment
- Antigua and Barbuda – The Antigua and Barbuda Defence Force
- Jamaica – The Jamaica Regiment
- Pakistan – 7th Battalion, The Baloch Regiment
