= Mercian Regiment =

Infantry regiment of the British Army

Mercian Regiment (Cheshire, Worcesters and Foresters, and Staffords)
- Cap badge of the regiment
- Active: 1 September 2007 – present
- Country: United Kingdom
- Branch: British Army
- Type: Line Infantry
- Role: 1st Battalion – Armoured Infantry; 4th Battalion – Army Reserve – Armoured Infantry
- Size: Two battalions 1,155 personnel 1st Battalion – 732; 4th Battalion – 423
- Part of: Queen's Division
- Garrison/HQ: RHQ - Lichfield; 1st Battalion - Bulford; 4th Battalion - Wolverhampton
- Nickname: The Heart of England's Infantry
- Motto: "Stand Firm Strike Hard"
- March: Wha Wadna Fecht for Charlie/Under the Double Eagle (Quick); Stand Firm and Strike Hard (Slow)
- Mascot: Ram (Private Derby XXXIV)
- Engagements: Operation Telic; Operation Herrick

Commanders
- Colonel-in-Chief: William, Prince of Wales
- Colonel of the Regiment: Lieutenant General Sir Ian Cave

Insignia
- Tactical Recognition Flash
- Arm Badge: Stafford Knot and Glider; From Staffordshire Regiment
- Abbreviation: MERCIAN MERC

The Mercian Regiment (Cheshire, Worcesters and Foresters, and Staffords) is an infantry regiment of the British Army, which is recruited from five of the counties that formed the ancient kingdom of Mercia. Known as 'The Heart of England's Infantry', it was formed on 1 September 2007 by the amalgamation of three existing regiments. The Regiment has had fifteen operational deployments since its formation.

== History ==
The regiment's formation was announced on 16 December 2004 by the then Secretary of Defence Geoff Hoon and General Sir Mike Jackson as part of the restructuring of the British Army Infantry - it consisted of three regular battalions, plus a territorial battalion, and was created through the merger of three single battalion regiments.

The antecedent regiments were: The Cheshire Regiment, The Worcestershire and Sherwood Foresters Regiment and the Staffordshire Regiment. The reserve West Midlands Regiment, with elements of the King's and Cheshire Regiment and the East of England Regiment formed the 4th Battalion, Mercian Regiment.

The regiment originally had three regular army battalions and one Army Reserve battalion, though the 3rd Battalion was disbanded, as part of the restructuring of the British Army, in July 2014. It had been part of the 7th Armoured Brigade based in Bad Fallingbostel, Germany. The regiment further restructured in September 2022 when the 2nd Battalion merged with the 1st Battalion. This happened as a result of the Integrated Review.

The regiment was deployed to Afghanistan (Herrick 6, Herrick 10, Herrick 12, Herrick 14, Herrick 15, Herrick 17 and Herrick 19) and to Iraq (Telic 11).

In 2017, the regiment moved to the King's Division.

== Structure ==
=== Regimental Headquarters ===
The regimental headquarters is situated at DMS Whittington in Lichfield, with outstations in Chester and Nottingham.

=== 1st Battalion ===
The 1st Battalion has deployed on five operational tours since its formation in 2007, one to Iraq, two to Afghanistan, one to Ukraine, and one to Estonia. It is an armoured infantry battalion, part of the 12th Armoured Brigade Combat Team based at Bulford Camp, England.

=== 4th Battalion ===
The 4th Battalion is the regiment's Army Reserve Armoured Infantry battalion. The battalion, whose HQ is based in Wolverhampton and Kidderminster, England, has 2 rifle companies, a support company and a HQ company.

== Regimental distinctions ==
The regiment's cap badge is a double-headed Mercian Eagle with Saxon crown. This has been chosen because it forms a link to the regiment's recruiting area, which encompass a number of divergent counties that do not have modern traditional links, only under the ancient Kingdom of Mercia (unlike the other new regiments from Scotland, Wales and Yorkshire). It was originally intended to use the old Mercian Brigade badge worn by the Cheshire Regiment, Staffordshire Regiment, Worcestershire Regiment and Sherwood Foresters from 1958 to 1968, rather than create an amalgamated badge that would require elements from all of the antecedents. In 2005, this badge was rejected by the Army Dress Committee on the grounds that it had been the badge of a territorial unit, The Mercian Volunteers, which was junior to the amalgamating regiments. Accordingly, a slightly modified design featuring two colours of metal was adopted.

In 2012, following the announcement that the 3rd Battalion (ex-Staffordshire Regiment) was to be disbanded, a proposal was submitted to the Army to have the name of the Mercian Regiment changed to reflect its entire lineage and maintain the Staffords name. In July 2014, this proposal was approved, and the regiment was renamed as The Mercian Regiment (Cheshire, Worcesters and Foresters, and Staffords).

=== Mascot ===
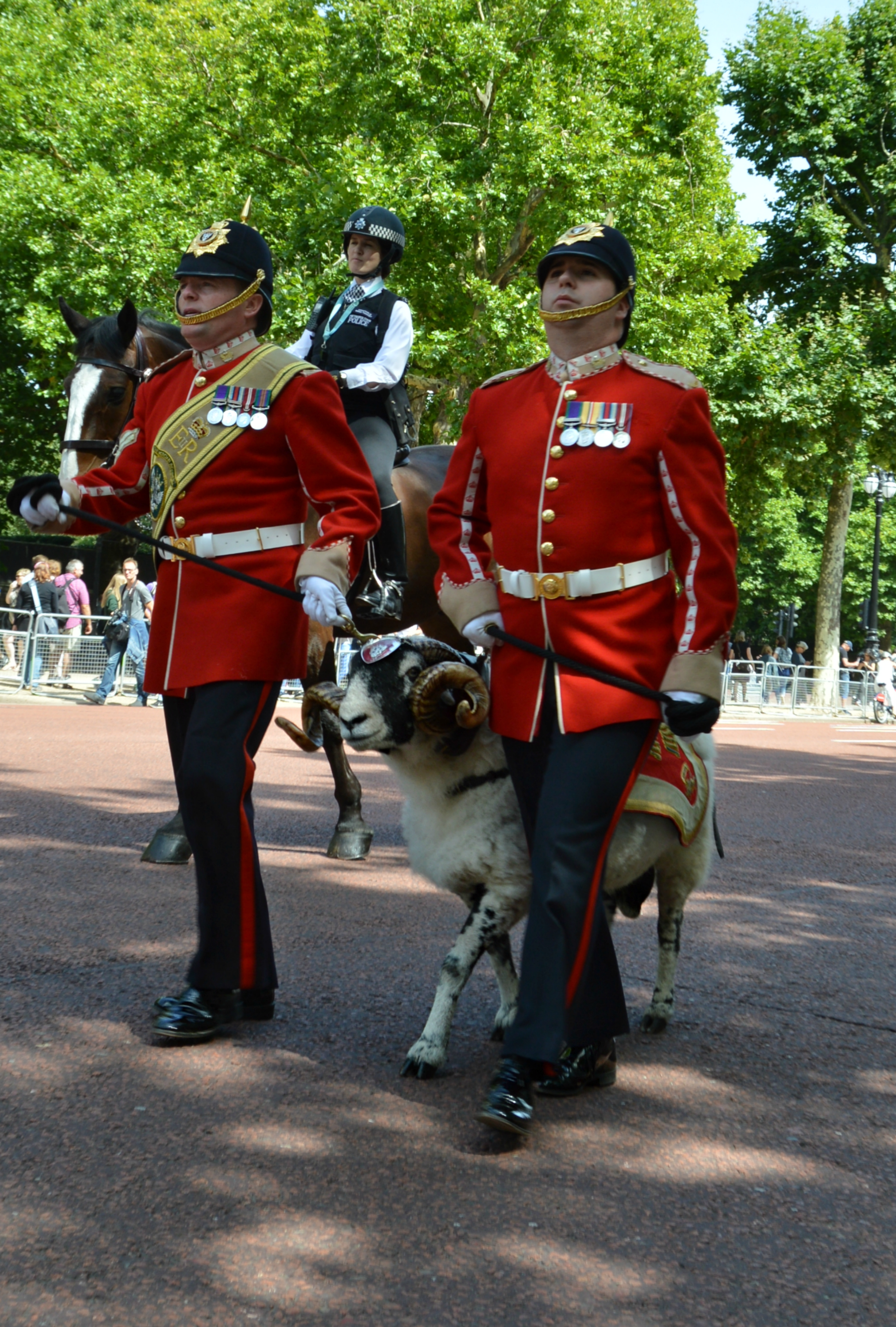
Private Derby XXX, a Swaledale ram and mascot for the Mercian Regiment

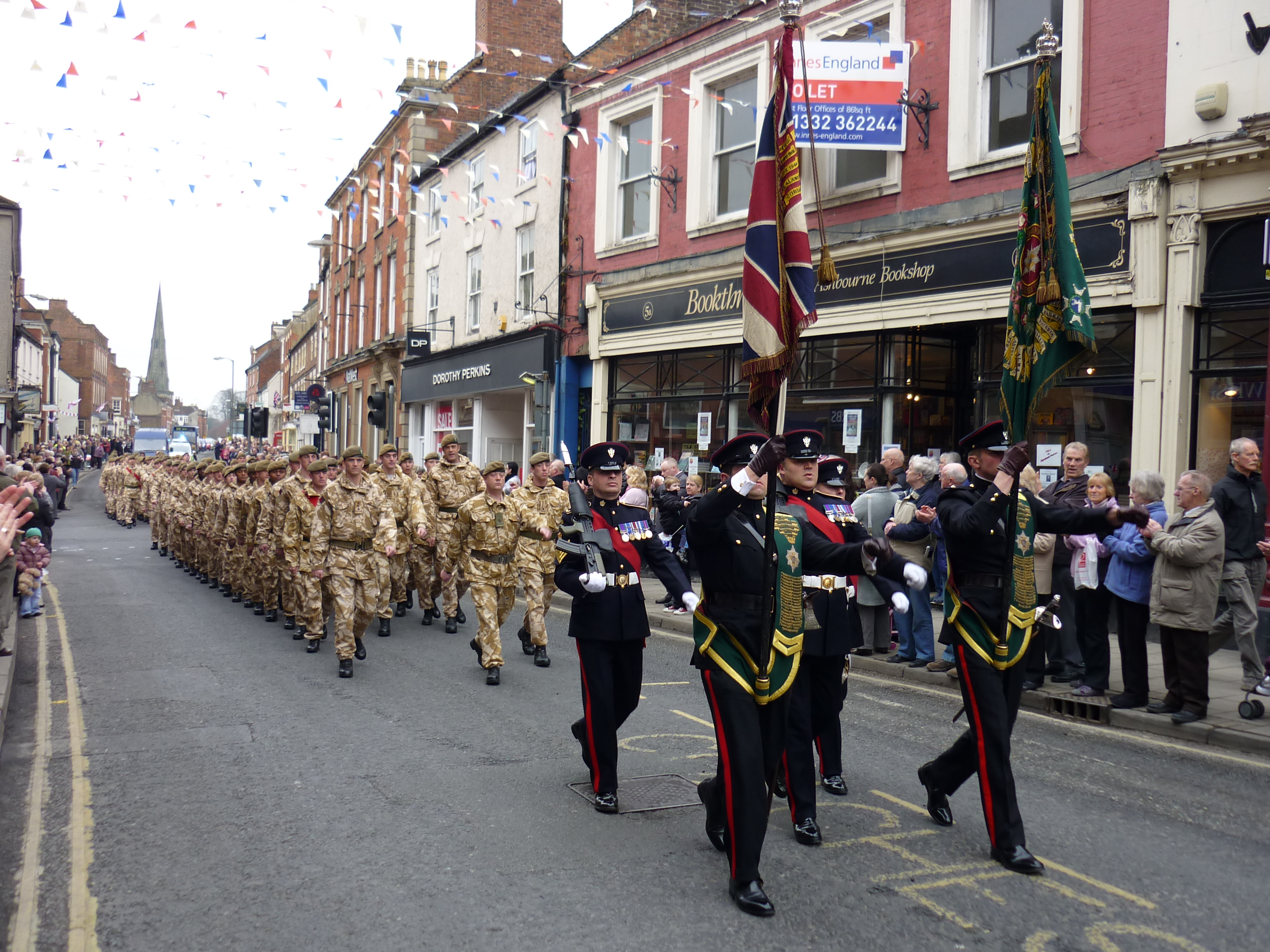
Mercian Regiment in Ashbourne, Derbyshire on 18 March 2010

"Derby", a Swaledale ram, is the regimental mascot, a tradition inherited from the Worcestershire and Sherwood Foresters Regiment. The 30th iteration of the Mascot was known as Lance Corporal Derby XXX, before he died on 27 November 2015. His successor, known as Private Derby XXXI, was announced on 20 February 2016 but he died on 1 September 2017.

In December 2017, Private Derby XXXII was presented to the Regiment by the Duke and Duchess of Devonshire at Chatsworth House. Private Derby was received by Brigadier Williams, OBE, Colonel of the Regiment.

Private Derby led the Tamworth Carnival in 2019. According to his handlers, this was the longest March Private Derby has done to date.

In July 2024, Derby XXXII was promoted to the rank of Corporal for the first time in the history of his lineage. The promotion took place following the annual pilgrimage to the regimental memorial at Crich on 7 July 2024.

On 31 July 2024, the Regiment announced "Corporal Derby XXXII, the Ram Major, had retired from his duties" and would be retiring to the Chatsworth Estate. Derby XXXIII was announced as his replacement.

The regiment also maintains loose links through its Regimental Headquarters with the former mascot of the Staffordshire Regiment, Watchman, who now carries out his duties as part of the Staffordshire Regiment Association.

=== Dress ===
Various "Golden Threads", representing the traditions of predecessor units, are incorporated in the Mercian Regiment's uniform:

- Arm badge: a gold wire Stafford knot and glider badge with a backing of "Brown Holland" material on a black felt patch from the Staffordshire Regiment
- Collar badge: oak leaves and acorn from the Cheshire Regiment combined with the motto Firm from the Worcestershire Regiment
- Facing colour: buff, from the Cheshire Regiment. To be worn on full dress uniform, mess dress and as piping on No.1 dress shoulder straps.
- Sword frog on the Sam Browne Belt comes from the Worcestershire Regiment
- Officer's rank badges will be coloured bronze/gun metal, from the North Staffordshire Regiment
- Warrant officers' and NCO's rank badges: Black backing from Staffordshire Regiment.
- Cap badge backing: A square Lincoln green cloth backing worn behind the cap badge on the beret, from the Sherwood Foresters
- Lanyards: Originally, each battalion wore a distinctively coloured lanyard on No.2 dress: red cerise for the 1st battalion, Lincoln green for the 2nd, black for the 3rd and Mercian blue for the 4th. A regimental pattern with twists of cerise, buff and green was worn by those who were extra-regimentally employed: this multi-coloured lanyard is now worn by all in the regiment.
- Tactical Recognition Flashes: The regiment's TRF is a 3 vertical striped diamond with cerise on the left, buff in the middle and Lincoln green on the right. Each Battalion also has their own, the 1st and 2nd Battalions use their antecedent regiment's flashes, buff and cerise for the 1st and cerise and Lincoln green for the 2nd. The 3rd battalion has a black diamond with the Stafford knot and the 4th Battalion has a blue diamond with the Mercian Eagle on it.
- Regimental Side Hat: black with buff inner crease and green piping and peak. The cap badge is in silver and gold wire embroidery.
- Pullover: Buff, worn by officers and WOs, from the Cheshire Regiment.
- Stable Belt: Buff, from the Cheshire Regiment, with a bronze locket bearing the cap badge in brass.

=== Band ===
The Band of the Mercian Regiment is the regimental military band of the Mercian Regiment. Based in Wolverhampton, the Band is composed of volunteer musicians that include many from civilian careers. The band undertakes a variety of performances, international, national, and local parades/festivals and concerts. In recent years, the band has visited countries such as Cyprus, participated in events like the Buxton Military Tattoo and in 2014, became the first and only reserve band based outside of London to performs during the changing of the Queen's Guard at both Buckingham Palace and St James's Palace. It also has taken part in the Household Division's Beating Retreat on Horse Guards Parade. One of its more notable directors was Captain Anthony Hodgetts, who after rising through the ranks of British Army Bands, served twelve years as Director of Music of the Royal Army of Oman.

On 1 June 2019, the Mercian Regiment Band led the Tamworth carnival though the town. According to the musicians, this was the longest march the band had done to date.

On 10 October 2019, Mercian Band Bugler Msn Wykes performed the Last Post and Rouse at the National Memorial Arboretum. He then performed the Last Post and Rouse at the War memorial in St Editha's Church Tamworth, Tamworth being the historical capital of Mercia.

== Regimental museums ==
The Mercian Regiment supports four museums that hold collections of the Mercian Regiment and its antecedent regiments:

- The Museum of the Mercian Regiment (WFR Collection) in Nottingham.
- The Staffordshire Regiment Museum in Whittington, Staffordshire.
- The Cheshire Military Museum in Chester.
- The Mercian Regiment Museum (Worcester) in Worcester.

== Regimental colonels ==
- 2007–2008: Maj Gen. C. G. S. Hughes
- 2008–2013: Brig. Andrew Sharpe
- 2013–2018: Brig. Andrew P. Williams
- 2018–present: Lieutenant General Ian Cave

== Lineage ==
1880	1881 Childers Reforms	1921 Name changes	1957 Defence White Paper	1966 Defence White Paper	1990 Options for Change	2003 Delivering Security in a Changing World
22nd (Cheshire) Regiment of Foot	The Cheshire Regiment					The Mercian Regiment
29th (Worcestershire) Regiment of Foot	The Worcestershire Regiment			The Worcestershire and Sherwood Foresters Regiment		The Mercian Regiment
36th (Herefordshire) Regiment of Foot	The Worcestershire Regiment			The Worcestershire and Sherwood Foresters Regiment		The Mercian Regiment
45th (Nottinghamshire) (Sherwood Foresters) Regiment of Foot	The Sherwood Foresters (Derbyshire Regiment) renamed in 1902: The Sherwood Foresters (Nottinghamshire and Derbyshire Regiment)			The Worcestershire and Sherwood Foresters Regiment		The Mercian Regiment
95th (Derbyshire) Regiment of Foot	The Sherwood Foresters (Derbyshire Regiment) renamed in 1902: The Sherwood Foresters (Nottinghamshire and Derbyshire Regiment)			The Worcestershire and Sherwood Foresters Regiment		The Mercian Regiment
38th (1st Staffordshire) Regiment of Foot	The South Staffordshire Regiment		The Staffordshire Regiment (Prince of Wales's)			The Mercian Regiment
80th (Staffordshire Volunteers) Regiment of Foot	The South Staffordshire Regiment		The Staffordshire Regiment (Prince of Wales's)			The Mercian Regiment
64th (2nd Staffordshire) Regiment of Foot	The Prince of Wales's (North Staffordshire Regiment)	The North Staffordshire Regiment (Prince of Wales's)	The Staffordshire Regiment (Prince of Wales's)			The Mercian Regiment
98th (Prince of Wales's) Regiment of Foot	The Prince of Wales's (North Staffordshire Regiment)	The North Staffordshire Regiment (Prince of Wales's)	The Staffordshire Regiment (Prince of Wales's)			The Mercian Regiment

== Alliances ==
All of the previous alliances of the three individual regiments were carried over into the Mercian Regiment.

- Antigua and Barbuda - Antigua and Barbuda Defence Force. Allied regiment.
- Australia - 8/7th The Royal Victoria Regiment. Allied regiment.
- Canada – 4th Battalion, Royal 22^{e} Régiment. Allied regiment.
- Canada - The Grey and Simcoe Foresters. Allied regiment.
- Canada - The Cape Breton Highlanders. Allied regiment.
- Jamaica - The Jamaica Regiment. Allied regiment.
- Pakistan - 13th Battalion, The Punjab Regiment. Allied regiment.
- Pakistan - 7th Battalion, The Baloch Regiment. Allied regiment.
- India - 5th Battalion (Napiers), Rajputana Rifles. Affiliated regiment.
- India - 14th Prince of Wales's Own Scinde Horse Affiliated regiment.
- India - Madras Engineer Group. Affiliated regiment.
- United Kingdom - N Battery (The Eagle Troop). Affiliated regiment.
- Royal Navy - HMS Albion. Other affiliation.
- England - The Worshipful Company of Bowyers. Other affiliation.
- France - Régiment de marche du Tchad. Bond of friendship.

== Freedoms ==
The regiment has received the Freedom of several locations throughout its history; these include:

- (England) 1 September 2007: Dudley Metropolitan Borough.
- (England) 1 September 2007: Lichfield.
- (England) 1 September 2007: Stafford.
- (England) 1 September 2007: Stockport. Originally granted to the Cheshire Regiment on 16 October 1969.
- (England) 1 September 2007: Wolverhampton.
- (England) 1 September 2007: Worcester. Originally granted to the Worcestershire Regiment on 15 April 1950.
- (England) 12 September 2007: Derby.
- (England) 14 September 2007: Tamworth.
- (England) 4 October 2007: Erewash. Originally granted to the Worcestershire Regiment in 1951, then to the Worcestershire and Sherwood Foresters Regiment in 1970.
- (England) 15 October 2007: Nottingham. Originally granted to the Sherwood Foresters Regiment on 22 October 1945, then to the Worcestershire and Sherwood Foresters Regiment on 28 February 1970.
- (England) 12 December 2007: Chesterfield. Originally granted to the Sherwood Foresters Regiment in 1946, then to the Worcestershire and Sherwood Foresters Regiment in 1970.
- (England) 18 December 2007: High Peak.
- (England) 18 December 2007: Mansfield.
- (England) 20 February 2008: Newark.
- (England) 12 March 2008: Bassetlaw.
- (England) 12 March 2008: Kidderminster. Originally granted to the Worcestershire Regiment in 1952, then to the Worcestershire and Sherwood Foresters Regiment in 1989.
- (England) 14 March 2008: Dudley.
- (England) 26 March 2008: Chester.
- (England) 4 September 2008: Macclesfield.
- (England) 5 November 2008: Crewe and Nantwich.
- (England) 2008: Ellesmere Port & Neston.
- (England) 16 February 2009: Newcastle-under-Lyme.
- (England) 17 February 2009: Walsall.
- (England) 18 February 2009: Sandwell.
- (England) 19 February 2009: Burton-on-Trent.
- (England) 21 February 2009: Stoke-on-Trent.
- (England) 25 March 2009: Congleton.
- (England) 18 May 2009: Redditch.
- (England) 26 November 2009: Derbyshire Dales.
- (England) 2009: Wirral. Originally granted to the Cheshire Regiment in 1996.
- (England) 26 January 2010: Amber Valley.
- (England) 22 September 2010: Gedling.
- (England) 14 October 2010: Cheshire East.
- (England) 20 October 2010: Reading.
- (England) 11 November 2010: South Derbyshire.
- (England) 2010: Southwell.
- (England) 20 January 2011: Bromsgrove.
- (England) 29 March 2011: Wychavon.
- (England) 7 November 2012: Cannock Chase.
- (England) 21 May 2013: Tameside.
- (England) 2014: Sandbach.
- (England) 17 February 2015: Crewe.
- (England) Unknown: Halton Originally granted to the Cheshire Regiment on 13 July 1989.

== Order of precedence ==
Preceded by Royal Yorkshire Regiment	Infantry Order of Precedence	Succeeded by Royal Welsh
