= Coat of arms of Greater Manchester =

- Armiger: Greater Manchester County Council
- Adopted: 1974
- Shield: Gules, ten Towers three two three two, all within a Bordure embattled Or
- Motto: Ever Vigilant

The coat of arms of Greater Manchester was granted to Greater Manchester County Council upon its formation in 1974 by the College of Arms. The county council was the top-tier local authority for Greater Manchester between 1974 and 1986, when the council was abolished and its arms fell into disuse.

== Description ==
The blazon of the arms is described as follows:

- Shield: The shield bears ten turrets in gold, representing the ten districts of the county, on a red ground.
- Supporters: The shield is supported on each side by a lion rampant in gold. Each lion bears on its shoulder a badge in red, the lion on the right of the shield bearing a badge with a French horn, representing music and culture, and the lion on the left of the shield bearing a badge with an open book, representing learning and academic life of the county.
- Crest: The helm is surmounted by a demi-lion carrying a banner bearing ten small turrets in gold on a red ground.
- Motto: "Ever Vigilant".

== Today ==
Logo of the Greater Manchester Combined Authority

Although the coat of arms is no longer in use by authorities, variant segments of the arms are still used today, such as the badge of the Greater Manchester Fire and Rescue Service whose arms bear a defaced version of the shield without the gold crenellations trim, and the crest which is also used by the Greater Manchester Army Cadet Force, a demi-lion carrying the banner. A banner based on the shield from these arms was also sometimes used as the flag to represent the area.

The current Greater Manchester Combined Authority does not use the symbols of the former Greater Manchester Council, instead using a wordmark consisting of its initials and full title.

== See also ==
- Flag of Greater Manchester
