= University Officers' Training Corps =

British military unit

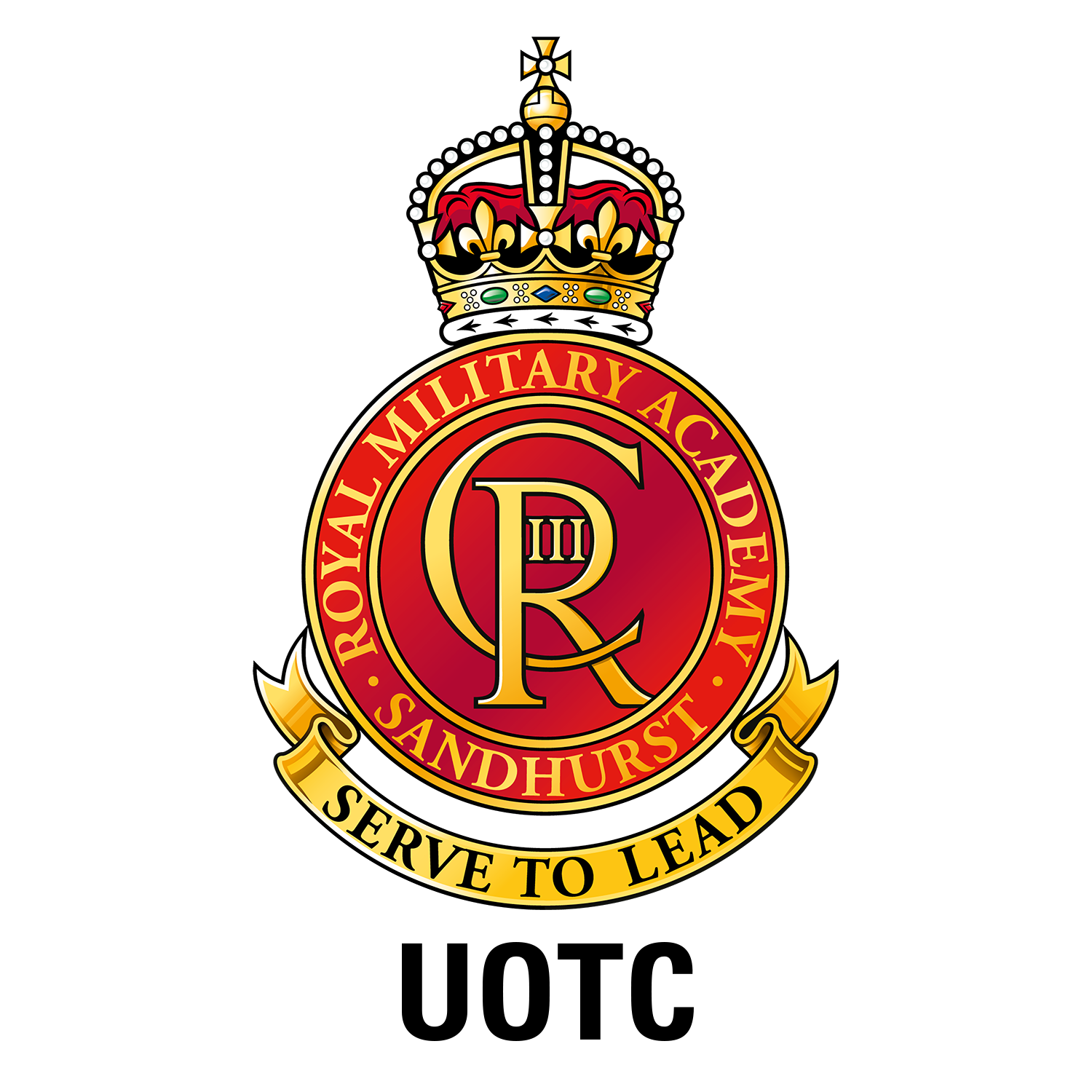
- Active: 1908–present
- Country: United Kingdom
- Branch: British Army
- Type: Training establishment University Service Units
- Role: Officer Training
- Size: 19 Units
- Part of: Sandhurst Group
- Website: Official website

Insignia
- Abbreviation: UOTC, OTC
- Also known as: Officers' Training Corps

The University Officers' Training Corps (UOTC), also known as the Officers' Training Corps (OTC), are British Army reserve units under the command of the Royal Military Academy Sandhurst, (Note: as part of Sandhurst Group) which recruit exclusively from universities and focus on leadership training and development. Their role is to provide university students with the opportunity to undertake modules of Reserve officer training designed to fit around their degree studies, while developing leadership abilities, skills, and experience that may be useful in either a future military or civilian career. While serving in the UOTC, officer cadets undertake the Reserve Officer Training Modules (Alpha and Bravo).

University students serving with the UOTC are members of the Army Reserve, and are attested and paid when on duty. They are classed as Group B (non-deployable) while serving in the UOTC. Students hold the rank of officer cadet. Students have no obligation to pursue further military service after leaving university and may resign from the UOTC at any time. UOTCs are staffed by officers and non-commissioned officers from both the Regular Army and the wider Army Reserve.

Each UOTC unit is effectively an independent regiment of the Army Reserve. Since 2011, six UOTCs have been grouped into joint units: Tayforth UOTC and Aberdeen UOTC form the Aberdeen and Tayforth Officers' Training Regiment; Leeds UOTC and Sheffield UOTC form the Yorkshire Officers' Training Regiment; and Liverpool UOTC and Manchester and Salford UOTC form the North West Officers' Training Regiment. Each unit retains its own cap badge, stable belt, customs, and traditions.

UOTCs also organise non-military outdoor pursuits such as hill walking and mountaineering, in addition to fielding sports teams that compete against other UOTCs and Army units. Officer cadets may also have opportunities to represent the Army in sport.

== History ==
=== General history of the units ===
The emergence of the Officers' Training Corps as a distinct organisation began in 1906, when the Secretary of State for War, Lord Haldane, appointed a committee to examine the shortage of officers in the Militia, the Volunteer Force, the Yeomanry, and the Reserve of Officers. The committee recommended the creation of an Officers' Training Corps consisting of two divisions: a junior division in public schools and a senior division in universities. In October 1908, under Army Order 160 of July 1908 and as part of the Haldane Reforms of the reserve forces, the contingents were formally established as the Officers' Training Corps and incorporated into the newly created Territorial Force under the Territorial and Reserve Forces Act 1907.

During the First World War, the OTCs became important officer-producing units, with approximately 20,577 officers and 12,290 other ranks recruited from the OTCs between August 1914 and March 1915. The Munich Crisis led to a significant increase in recruitment to military units, including the OTCs, as many volunteered for military service in the lead-up to the Second World War. At the outbreak of the Second World War, the UOTCs became Senior Training Units (STCs), and their members automatically joined the Home Guard. In 1948 they became University Training Units (UTCs).

In 1948, the senior OTC divisions became part of the Territorial Army (now the Army Reserve), and women were admitted for the first time through the formation of Women's Royal Army Corps sub-units. Women are now fully integrated throughout the organisation. The junior divisions, by then renamed the Junior Training Corps, became the Army sections of the Combined Cadet Force. The units reverted to the title University Officers' Training Corps (UOTCs) in 1955.

There are currently fourteen UOTCs and three Officer Training Regiments (OTRs) across the United Kingdom, each serving universities and Army Reserve units within a distinct geographic region. Larger regions may contain several detachments. Each UOTC functions as an independent regiment, with its own cap badge, stable belt, and customs and traditions. Members hold the rank of officer cadet (OCdt) and are members of the Army Reserve, paid when on duty. They are not classed as trained ranks and do not hold commissions; consequently, they cannot be mobilised for active service and remain classified as Group B reservists during their time in the UOTC. As untrained strength, their remuneration does not attract X Factor and is not pensionable. Officer cadets may hold appointments such as Junior Under Officer (JUO), Company Under Officer (CUO), or Senior Under Officer (SUO). They may also apply to the Army Officer Selection Board (AOSB), which, if passed, allows them to undertake the Army Reserve Commissioning Course with the aim of commissioning as a second lieutenant.

== Selection and training ==
Each UOTC follows a similar recruitment process, beginning with prospective candidates identifying the unit affiliated with their university and making contact either through the Army website or at university freshers' fairs. UOTCs also conduct interviews and selection events to reduce the number of applicants. Candidates must also complete a British Army medical assessment and meet the Army's minimum fitness standards.

The training structure for officer cadets is broadly as follows:

=== Year one: Basic training (MOD Alpha) ===
Officer cadets undertake the Reserve Officer Training Module Alpha. This includes instruction in basic military skills such as drill, map reading, camouflage, first aid, weapons handling, small-unit tactics, radio procedure, and fieldcraft.

=== Year two: Leadership training (MOD Bravo) ===
Having learned how to operate as part of an effective military team, officer cadets in the second year complete Reserve Officer Training Module Bravo. This phase focuses on leadership and command, including planning attacks, issuing orders, conducting debriefs, and ensuring the welfare of subordinates.

=== Year three: Leadership in action ===
Senior officer cadets may hold appointments within their UOTC, such as Junior Under Officer or Senior Under Officer, and are responsible for mentoring junior officer cadets completing MOD Alpha and MOD Bravo. Some officer cadets choose to attend the Army Officer Selection Board in pursuit of a commission in either the Regular Army or Army Reserve. Those pursuing a reserve commission may complete the remaining required training at Sandhurst through a series of short courses. Candidates for a Regular Army commission must complete the full 42-week commissioning course at Sandhurst.

There is no obligation for UOTC officer cadets to attend the AOSB, undertake the Reserve Commissioning Course, or complete the Regular Commissioning Course, and many do not continue military training after university.

== Additional courses and opportunities ==
Officer cadets in the UOTC may participate in a wide range of activities both within the UOTC and across the wider Army Reserve. These include exercises such as Exercise Cambrian Patrol and courses run by the Royal Army Physical Training Corps, including qualification as an Army Reserve physical training instructor (PTI).

== Adventurous training and social aspects ==
Like other Army Reserve units, UOTCs may participate in the British Army's Adventurous Training (AT) programme, which includes activities such as skiing, rock climbing, mountain biking, and hiking.

UOTCs also maintain an active social programme, including regimental dinners, formal events, and informal social activities.

== Inter-UOTC competitions ==
The British Army organises several competitions throughout the academic year in which OTCs and the four Defence Technical Undergraduate Scheme (DTUS) squadrons compete against one another. One such competition is the King's Challenge Cup, a sports tournament.

== Command and control ==
The senior officer responsible for the UOTC is the Deputy Commandant RMAS (UOTC), an appointment held by a colonel (OF-5).

== UOTC units ==
	Recruits From	External Website
Aberdeen and Tayforth Officers' Training Regiment (Aberdeen UOTC combined with Tayforth UOTC)	University of Aberdeen, Robert Gordon University, Aberdeen College, St. Andrews University, Dundee University, Abertay University, Stirling University	Aberdeen UOTC Tayforth UOTC
Birmingham UOTC	University of Birmingham, Birmingham City University, University College Birmingham, Warwick, Aston, Coventry, Wolverhampton, Worcester, Keele, Staffordshire University and Harper Adams	Birmingham UOTC
Cambridge UOTC	Cambridge University, University of East Anglia, Anglia Ruskin University, University of Hertfordshire and University of Essex	Cambridge UOTC
East Midlands UOTC	Nottingham University, Nottingham Trent University, Northampton University, Leicester University, Derby University, De Montfort University, Loughborough University, University of Lincoln	East Midlands UOTC
Edinburgh UOTC	University of Edinburgh, Heriot-Watt University, Edinburgh Napier University, Queen Margaret University and the Scottish Agricultural College	Edinburgh UOTC
Glasgow and Strathclyde UOTC	University of Glasgow, Strathclyde University, Glasgow Caledonian University, University of the West of Scotland, Royal Conservatoire of Scotland, Glasgow School of Art	Glasgow and Strathclyde UOTC
London UOTC	University of the Arts, Birkbeck University of London, Brunel University, University of Bedfordshire, Canterbury Christ Church University, City University of London, University of East London, Goldsmiths University of London, University of Greenwich, University of Hertfordshire, Imperial College London, University of Kent, King's College London, Kingston University, London Business School, London Metropolitan University, London School of Economics, Northeastern University London, Middlesex University, Queen Mary University of London, Regent's University London, University of Roehampton, Royal Holloway University of London, Royal Veterinary College, School of Oriental & Asian Studies, London South Bank University, St George's University of London, St Mary's University, University of Surrey, University of Westminster, University of West London, University College London	London UOTC
Northumbrian UOTC	Universities of Newcastle, Northumbria, Durham, Teesside and Sunderland	Northumbrian UOTC
North West Officers' Training Regiment (Liverpool and Lancaster UOTC combined with Manchester and Salford UOTC)	University of Manchester, Manchester Metropolitan University, University of Salford, University of Bolton, University of Liverpool, Lancaster University, Liverpool John Moores University, Hope College, University of Central Lancashire, Edge Hill University, St. Martins College, Chester College	Liverpool and Lancaster UOTC Manchester and Salford UOTC
Oxford UOTC	Buckinghamshire New University, Oxford University, Oxford Brookes University, Reading University, Royal Agricultural University. University of Buckingham, University of Gloucestershire	Oxford UOTC
Queen's UOTC	Queen's University Belfast and the University of Ulster	Queen's UOTC
Southampton UOTC	University of Winchester, Solent University, Bournemouth University, Southampton University, Portsmouth University, University of Brighton, University of Sussex	Southampton UOTC
South West Officers' Training Regiment (Bristol UOTC combined with Exeter UOTC)	University of Bristol, University of Bath, University of the West of England, Bath Spa University, University of Exeter, University of Plymouth, Plymouth Marjon University, Falmouth University	Bristol UOTC Exeter UOTC
Wales UOTC	Cardiff University, University of South Wales, Cardiff Metropolitan University, Aberystwyth, Bangor, Swansea, University of Glamorgan, Wrexham, Chester, Royal Welsh College of Music & Drama	Wales UOTC
Yorkshire Officers' Training Regiment (Leeds UOTC combined with Sheffield UOTC)	University of Sheffield, Sheffield Hallam University, Leeds Universities, Bradford University, Huddersfield University, University of York, York St John University and Hull University	Leeds UOTC Sheffield UOTC

=== Aberdeen ===
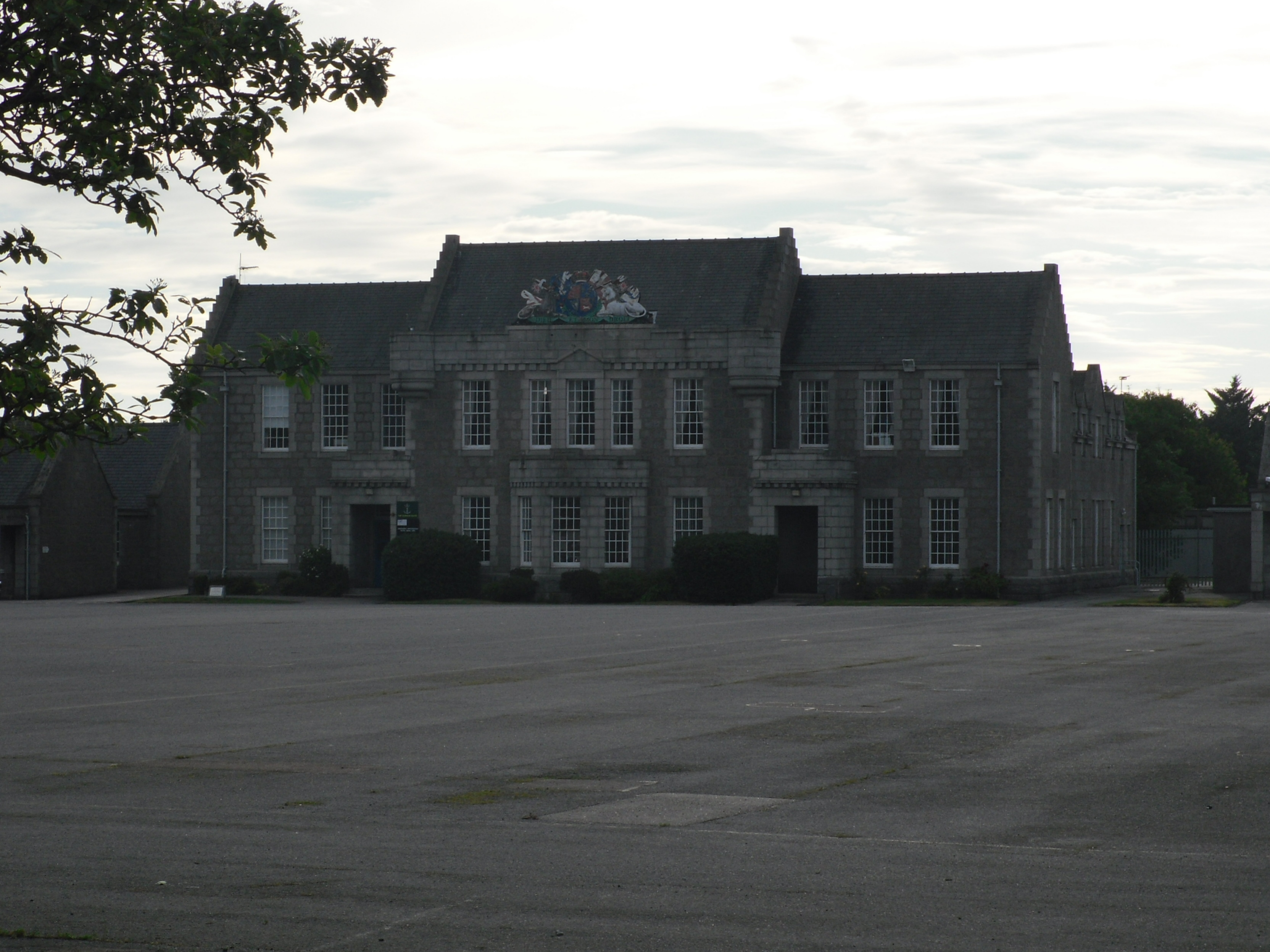
Gordon Barracks, home of Aberdeen UOTC

The first military unit formed by the University of Aberdeen was a battery of the 1st Aberdeen Volunteer Royal Artillery, raised in December 1885. The battery was officered by members of the university staff and commanded by Captain William Stirling, then professor of physiology. In March 1895, the University Battery was absorbed by the 1st Heavy Battery. In November 1897, an Aberdeen University detachment of the 1st Volunteer Battalion, Gordon Highlanders, was recruited, and in 1898 the detachment became University Company ("U" Company). In 1912, the Aberdeen University contingent of the Officers' Training Corps was formally raised in response to the recommendations of the committee formed by Lord Haldane under the chairmanship of the then principal Sir George Adam Smith. The War Office authorised the formation of a medical unit and appointed as Commanding Officer Major G A Williamson MA MD DPH.

"U" Company had by this time become part of the 4th Battalion, Gordon Highlanders, and at the outbreak of the First World War was mobilised and sent to France, the only university contingent to go. The story of "U" Company as a fighting unit is told by Alexander Rule in his book Students Under Arms.

In February 1924, the War Office authorised the establishment of an infantry unit and the right to wear the Gordon tartan. The infantry unit was commanded initially by Major John Boyd Orr DSO MC (later John Boyd Orr, 1st Baron Boyd-Orr). The pipe band was instituted in 1924 and became one of the most popular features of the unit. In 1929, the Scots Guards provided the senior warrant officer of the permanent staff and established a Household Division link. In 1935, it was decided that the cap badge, which up to then had been the university crest, should be replaced by the boar's head, the family crest of the founder of the university, with the motto "Non Confundar" ('I shall not be troubled').

During the Second World War, the unit expanded as all students of military age who had been granted deferment were required to enroll as part of a National Service obligation. At its peak, the unit was some 491 strong with four infantry companies, two medical companies and a signals section. Throughout the war, the unit in conjunction with the university ran special technical courses for Royal Artillery cadets, of which a total of 427 attended. In February 1943, the unit provided the backbone of the 9th City of Aberdeen (University Home Guard) Battalion, in addition to its normal role.

In October 1948, Medical, Royal Electrical and Mechanical Engineers, Intelligence, Royal Engineers, Royal Signals and infantry sub-units were formed. As a result of various re-organisations over the years, only the last three sub-units survive today. In 1951, women were allowed to join the UOTC and a Women's Royal Army Corps sub-unit was formed; this has now been absorbed into the existing three sub-units. The unit is now based at Gordon Barracks in Bridge of Don.

=== Birmingham ===
In 1900 the University of Birmingham raised a company, sanctioned by the War Office, which was known as U Company of the 1st Volunteer Battalion, Royal Warwickshire Regiment. Captain W. E. Bennett, one of the staff of the university, was given the command. The company held its first parade in May 1900, and the occasion was celebrated by the presentation of the Inter-Section Challenge Cup by the chancellor of the university, Joseph Chamberlain. In 1900 the Volunteers, of which U Company was part, were 1,406 strong.

In 1908, the Birmingham University contingent of the Officers' Training Corps was formally raised in response to the recommendations of the committee formed by Lord Haldane. Field Marshal William Slim, 1st Viscount Slim was a member of the Birmingham UOTC from 1912 to 1914. Birmingham UOTC is based at Montgomery House in Sparkbrook.

=== Cambridge ===
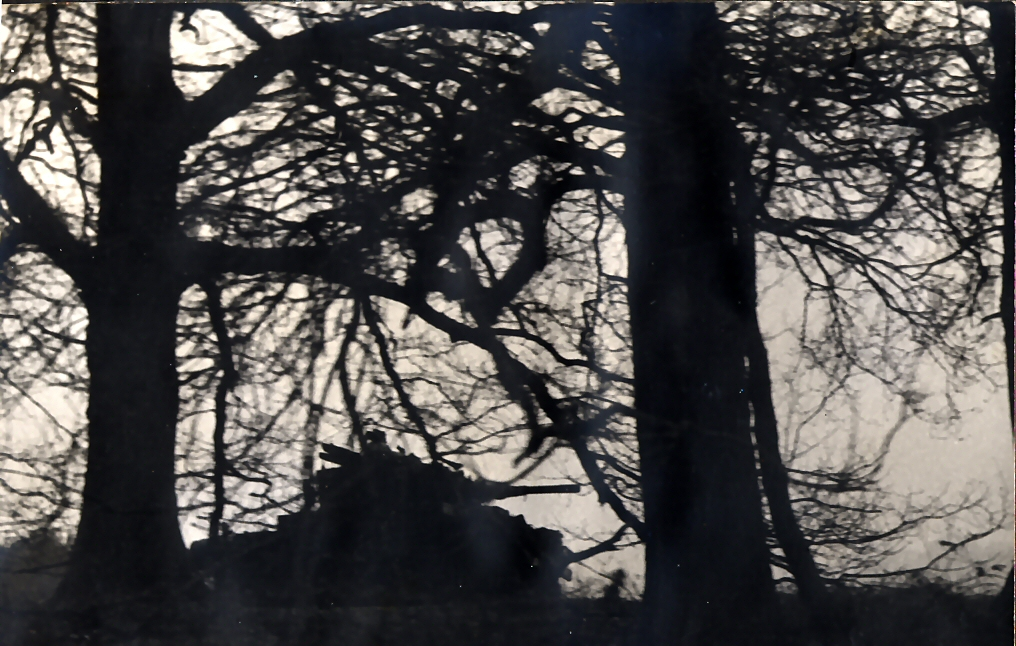
An Alvis Saladin armoured car of the Cambridge UOTC on exercise in 1974

Cambridge UOTC claims descent from a unit raised in 1803, when, with Britain under threat of French invasion, undergraduates from the University of Cambridge formed a corps of Volunteers to help defend British shores. Thereafter, the Cambridge University Rifle Volunteers (CURV) was formally raised in 1860. During British involvement in the Second Boer War in 1899 there was a public focus on volunteering for the forces serving in South Africa. In response to this, a detachment was sent to South Africa.

Attached to the Suffolk Regiment, the CURV men reported for duty on 20 January 1900 in Bury St Edmunds. On 11 February, they sailed from Southampton on the SS Doune Castle, arriving in Cape Town on 7 March. Initially the Cambridge Volunteers worked as guards on the railway lines around Cape Town, but then marched with the Suffolk Regiment as part of General Bryan Mahon's column to attack a Boer position in Barberton in September 1900. With a large welcome home awaiting them, including a service in Great St Mary's Church, the volunteers were back in Cambridge on 6 May 1901. All the Volunteers were made Honorary Freemen of the Borough of Cambridge and on 21 December 1904, three years later, CURV was granted the battle honour "South Africa 1900-01". Cambridge is the only UOTC to have earned a battle honour.

In 1908, Cambridge University contingent of the Officers' Training Corps was formally raised in response to the recommendations of the committee formed by Lord Haldane and consisted of a battalion of infantry, a squadron of cavalry, a battery of artillery and medical and engineering units. During the First World War, Cambridge UOTC supplied 3,000 officers to the British Army between August 1914 and March 1915: this was more than any other UOTC. During the Second World War, Cambridge UOTC raised the 8th (Cambridge University) Cambridgeshire Battalion of the Cambridgeshire Regiment. Cambridge UOTC is based at the Army Reserve Centre in Coldham's Lane, Cambridge.

=== East Midlands ===
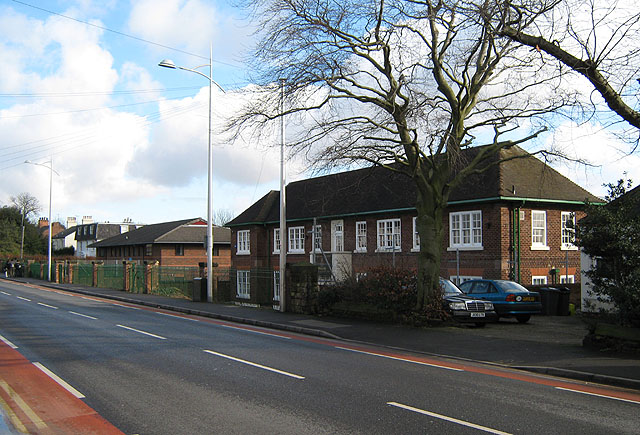
Army Reserve Centre, Broadgate, home of the East Midlands UOTC

The University College Nottingham Officers' Training Corps was first formed on 27 April 1909 when 27 students from University College Nottingham petitioned the university's Senate Council to form a contingent of the Officers' Training Corps. Their petition was accepted by the War Office and later that same year, the unit was formed.

The names of those who died in both World Wars are recorded on a plaque in the University of Nottingham's Trent Building. The name of the unit was changed in 1966 to the "East Midlands Universities Officers' Training Corps" in a move that allowed volunteers from all higher education institutions in the East Midlands to join.

East Midlands UOTC's cap badge is that of the Sherwood Foresters, with replaced wording. As part of the unit's historic affiliations with the Sherwood Foresters (since amalgamated into the Worcestershire and Sherwood Foresters Regiment and, later, into 2nd Battalion, Mercian Regiment before it was disbanded in 2022), East Midlands Universities OTC's stable belt is horizontally green, maroon and green again, charged with a thin central horizontal silver strip for differentiation known as the 'silver stripe of learning.' East Midlands UOTC is based at the Army Reserve Centre, Broadgate in Beeston.

=== Edinburgh ===
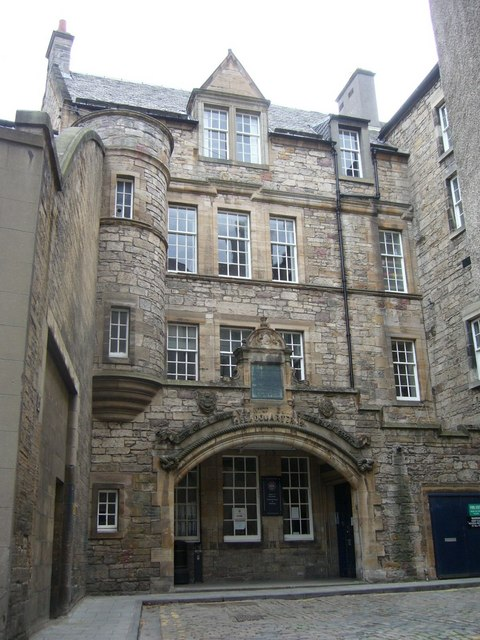
Forrest Road Drill Hall, home of Edinburgh UOTC from 1957 to 1993

Edinburgh UOTC has its origins in No. 4 Company of the 1st City of Edinburgh Rifle Volunteer Corps (from 1865 the 1st Queen's Edinburgh Rifle Volunteer Brigade), which was raised on 31 August 1859. Some 90 volunteers from the University of Edinburgh joined the company. In 1908, the Edinburgh University contingent of the Officers' Training Corps was formally raised in response to the recommendations of the committee formed by Lord Haldane (the Haldane Reforms). Haldane was Rector of the University of Edinburgh at the time. 'A' Company of 3rd Battalion, Queen's Edinburgh Rifles, Royal Scots, (the old No 4 Company) and Left Half of 1st Heavy Battery, 1st Edinburgh (City) Royal Garrison Artillery (also populated by members of the university) transferred to the new contingent. Some 2,250 students from the university were commissioned during the First World War.

The unit moved to the former Queen's Edinburgh Rifles' Forrest Hill drill hall in 1957: it became the "Edinburgh and Heriot-Watt Universities OTC" in 1966 and the "City of Edinburgh Universities OTC" in 1993. It moved to Duke of Edinburgh House in Colinton Road, Edinburgh in 1993.

=== Glasgow and Strathclyde ===
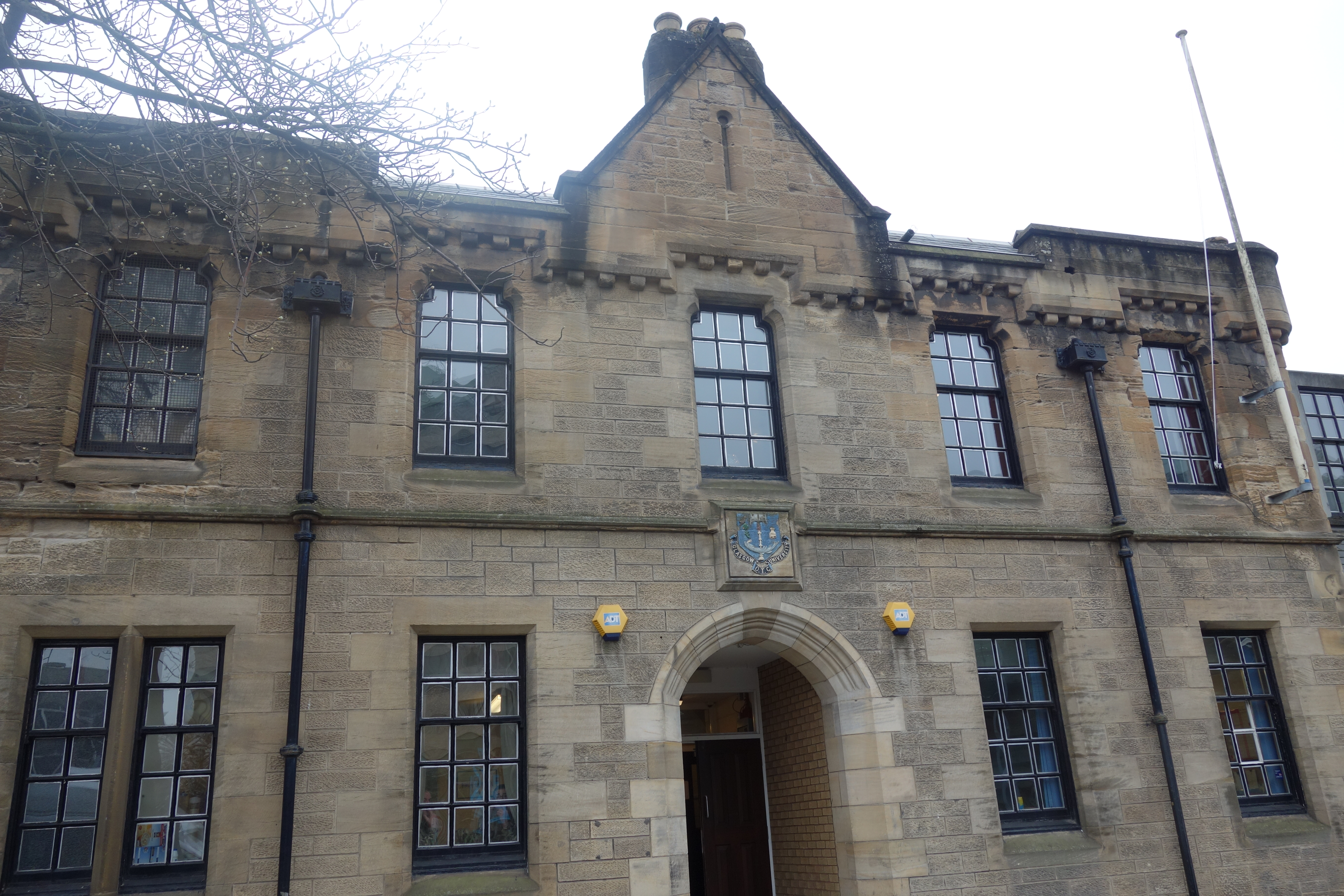
The Drill Hall at University Place, home of Glasgow UOTC

The origins of the University of Glasgow's links with the military can be traced back to the Jacobite risings of 1715 and 1745, when companies of Militia were raised to defend the pro-Hanoverian University and the City of Glasgow against the absolutist Highland Jacobites. In 1880s, Glasgow professors such as William John Macquorn Rankine and students formed two infantry companies as part of the local 1st Lanarkshire (Glasgow 1st Western) Rifle Volunteers. This unit later became the 5th Battalion of the Cameronians (Scottish Rifles), based at West Princes Street drill hall in the Woodlands area of Glasgow.

In 1908, the Glasgow University contingent of the Officers' Training Corps was formally raised in response to the recommendations of the committee formed by Lord Haldane and consisted of three infantry companies and an engineering company. The new unit was located in its own drill hall at University Place on the Glasgow University campus.

During the First World War, UOTC members were amongst the first to volunteer, and Glasgow UOTC trained many potential officers for Kitchener's New Armies. By the summer of 1916, some 2,800 officers had been raised by the university.

In the Second World War, conscription was introduced immediately, and every student was regarded as a potential officer. The UOTC's role was to train officers from those University students conscripted into the Army and to provide basic training for those who remained behind as a Home Guard unit. At its height the Corps rose to 1,500 members. Glasgow UOTC remains based at the drill hall in University Place.

=== London ===
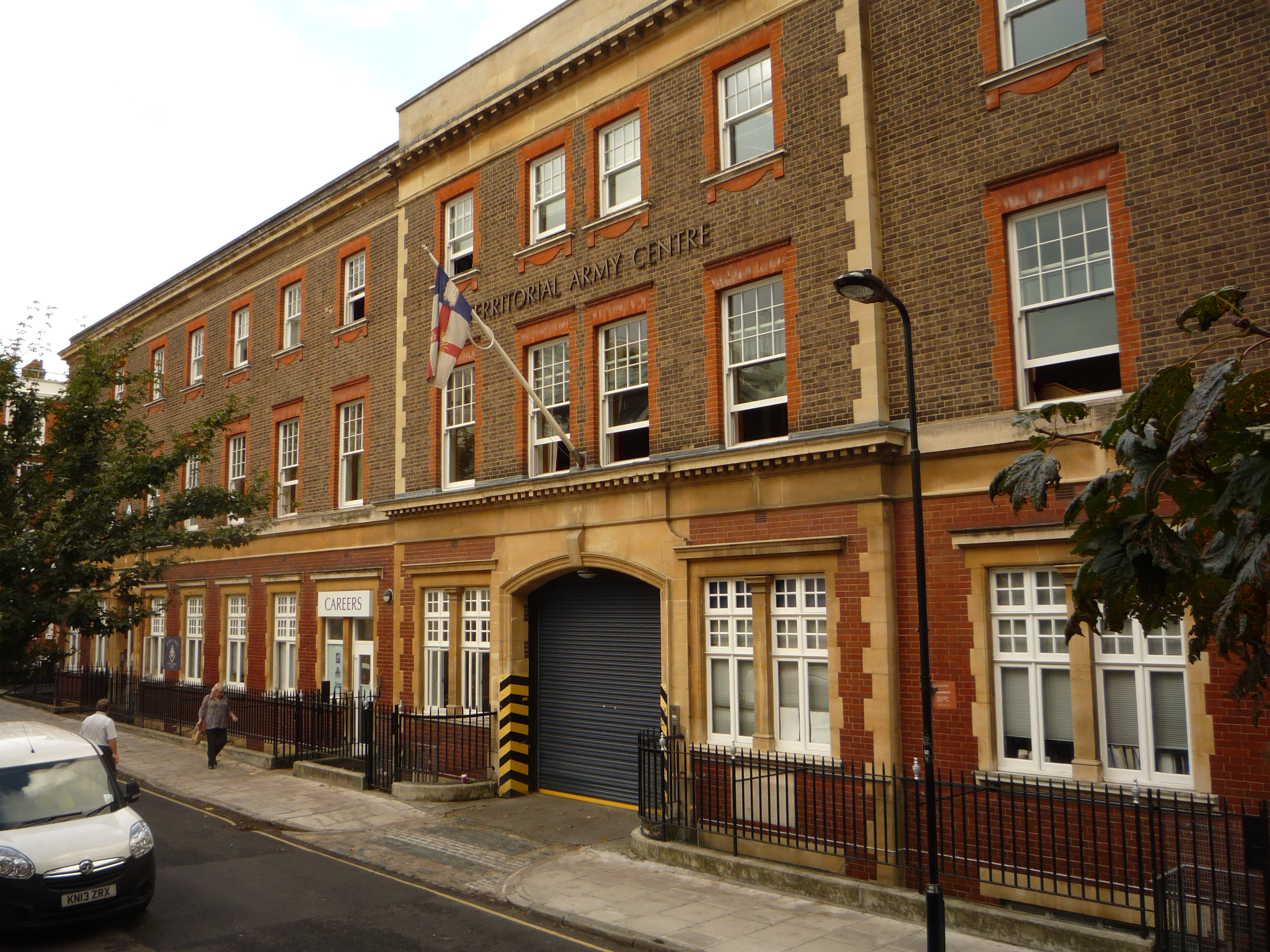
Yeomanry House in Handel Street, home of London UOTC

In 1909, the London University contingent of the Officers' Training Corps was formally raised in response to the recommendations of the committee formed by Lord Haldane. By autumn 1914 the University of London had enrolled 950 students in the UOTC. During the First World War, University of London OTC supplied 500 officers to the British Army between August 1914 and March 1915 alone. Some 665 officers, trained by the ULOTC, died during the whole of the First World War and some 245 officers, trained by the ULOTC, died in the Second World War. The University of London OTC is the largest UOTC with about 400 officer cadets. It has been based at Yeomanry House in Handel Street, London since 1992. In 2011, Canterbury Company was founded to recruit officer Cadets from the Kent area.

=== Northumbrian ===
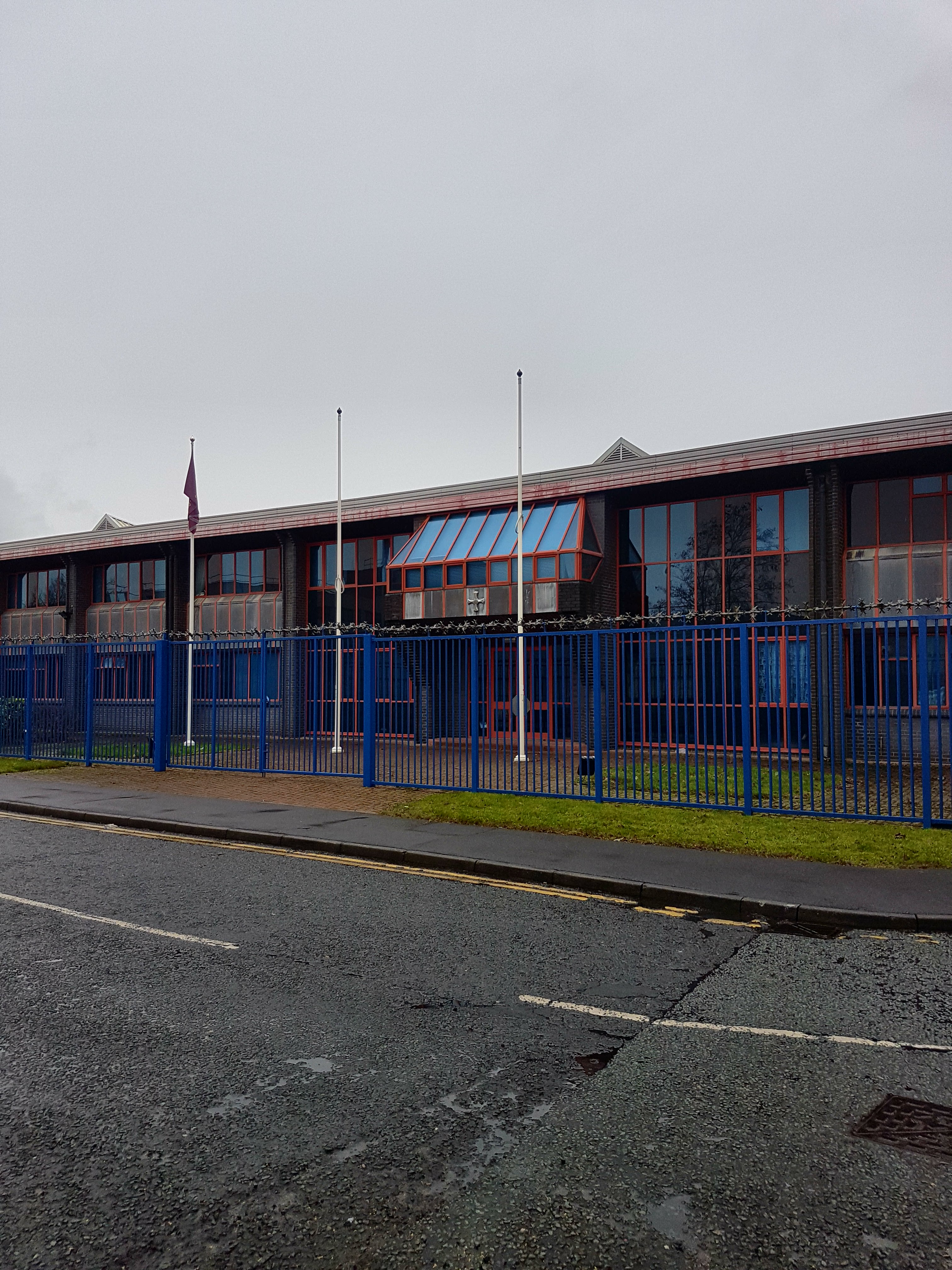
St. Cuthbert's Keep at Holland Drive, home of Northumbrian UOTC

Durham University formed the "K" Company of the 3rd Battalion, Northumberland Fusiliers in 1908. With the formation of the Officers' Training Corps later in that year, this was transferred to the OTC. The UOTC sent a detachment to London to act as part of the Guard of honour at the coronation of King George V in June 1911. Some 2,464 members of Durham University (including Armstrong College and the College of Medicine in Newcastle, both now part of Newcastle University) served in the First World War, with 325 being killed, along with 525 members of Bede College (then an associated college rather than part of the university), of whom 91 were killed. In a serious accident in April 1955, four officer cadets from the UOTC were killed when they were hit by a de Havilland Chipmunk at Otterburn.

Following the creation of Newcastle University (formerly King's College, Durham University) in 1963, the unit became the "Northumbrian Universities Officers Training Corps": it was initially based at the Yeomanry Drill Hall in Northumberland Road in Newcastle, but moved to St George's Army Reserve Centre in Sandyford Road, Jesmond in 1975 and then moved again to St. Cuthbert's Keep at Holland Drive in Fenham in the 1990s.

=== North West Officers' Training Regiment ===
==== Liverpool and Lancaster ====
The Liverpool University contingent of the Officers' Training Corps was formed in 1919 to provide military training for the students of the University of Liverpool. It occupied its own drill hall from 1928 and was re-organised on a faculty basis at the start of the Second World War but was re-unified again in 1955. At the turn of the century it was based at 128 Mount Pleasant in Liverpool but is now based at Crawford Hall in Allerton. Since September 2011 it has formed part of the North West Officers' Training Regiment.

==== Manchester and Salford ====
In 1898 the University of Manchester raised a company, sanctioned by the War Office, which was known as N Company of the 2nd Volunteer Battalion, Manchester Regiment. In 1908 N Company became the Manchester University contingent of the Officers' Training Corps. Some 314 members of Manchester University died in the First World War and another 200 members of the university died in the Second World War. The unit was based at a Drill Hall in Stretford Road, but since 1994, has been based at University Barracks in Boundary Lane, Manchester 15. Since September 2011 it has formed part of the North West Officers' Training Regiment.

=== Oxford ===
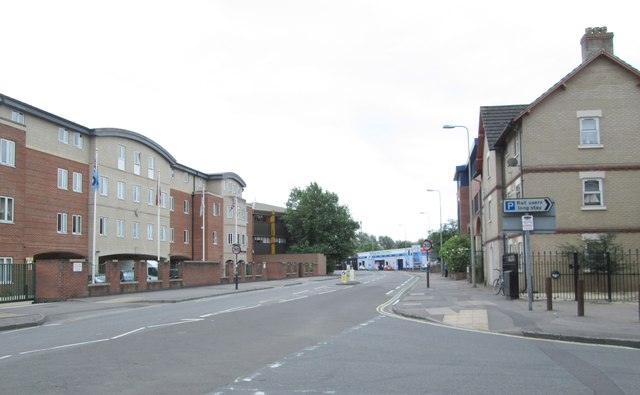
Falklands House, home of the Oxford UOTC (on the left)

Oxford UOTC claims descent from the bodyguard to Charles I that students of the University of Oxford formed in 1642, during the English Civil War. But the immediate origin of the present body is the 1st Oxfordshire (Oxford University) Rifle Volunteer Corps, formed in 1859 and established (together with many other volunteer corps across the country) in response to the threat of war with France. From 1881, the OURVC served as one of several volunteer battalions of the Oxfordshire Light Infantry and in 1887 it became known as the 1st (Oxford University) Volunteer Battalion or the Oxford University Volunteers (OUV).

In 1908, the Oxford University contingent of the Officers' Training Corps was formally raised in response to the recommendations of the committee formed by Lord Haldane. From 1912 to 1918, the Oxford OTC was commanded by John Stenning, a fellow of Wadham College, Oxford. In September 1914, at the start of the First World War the university processed some 2,000 applications for commissions in the British Army and another 3,000 subsequently passed through its School of Instruction. The OTC was based at Yeomanry House in Manor Road from 1929, but moved to Harcourt House in Marston Road from 1994 and moved again to purpose-built facilities at Falklands House in Oxpens Road in 1998.

=== Queen's University Belfast (Queen's) ===
In October 1908, the Queen's University contingent of the Officers' Training Corps was formally raised in response to the recommendations of the committee formed by Lord Haldane. Parades were held in the old gymnasium which occupied the site of the former Drill Hall located south of the Queen's University Belfast Students' Union. A Drill Hall was subsequently built at the cost of £4,000 and officially opened on 20 November 1912 by Brigadier General Count Gleichen, who deputised for the Commander-in-Chief of the Forces in Ireland.

During the First World War, training was increased for UOTC members being commissioned into newly formed battalions. By the end of the war almost 1,200 commissions had been obtained by cadets who had passed through the ranks of the contingent. In 1930 the Corps' title was changed to the "Queen's University, Belfast Contingent of the Officers' Training Corps". A Reception Unit and a Joint Recruiting Board were set up in the Drill Hall to deal with applications for commissions during the Second World War. Queen's UOTC is based at Tyrone House in Malone Road, Belfast.

=== Southampton ===
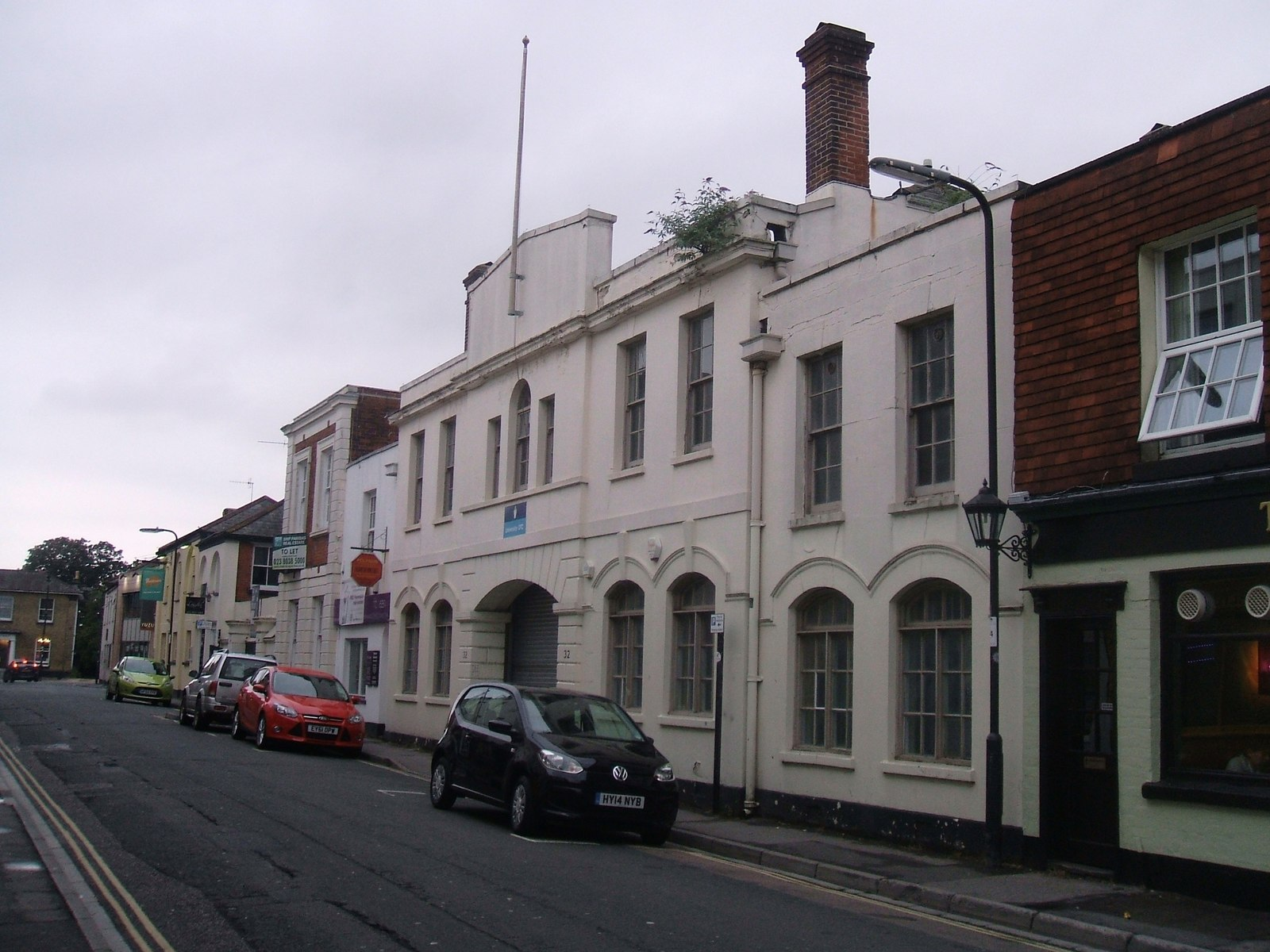
Carlton Place, Southampton, home of Southampton UOTC

In November 1902 twenty students from Hartley University College raised a company, sanctioned by the War Office, which formed part of the 2nd Volunteer Battalion of the Hampshire Regiment. Members of the company were commissioned into the 5th Battalion of the Hampshire Regiment in 1914 and served on the Western Front during the First World War.

A separate UOTC was formed in Southampton in November 1937, and the relationship with the Hampshire Regiment discontinued. However, after supplying significant numbers officers to the British Army during the Second World War, recruitment fell and the UOTC was placed in suspended animation in April 1951. The UOTC was reformed in October 1979 and moved to its present premises at Carlton Place in Southampton in 1981.

=== South West Officers' Training Regiment ===
==== Bristol ====
In 1910, the Bristol University contingent of the Officers' Training Corps was formally raised in response to the recommendations of the committee formed by Lord Haldane. Some 1,000 men joined the Bristol UTC during the course of the First World War and, of these, some 105 were killed in action during that war. In 1925 it provided the Guard of honour for the visit of King George V and Queen Mary to Bristol to open buildings for the University of Bristol. It undertook its training collectively with other universities until 1928 when it arranged its own annual camp. During the Second World War twenty-one cadets volunteered for immediate service. Bristol UOTC is based at the Artillery Grounds in Whiteladies Road, Bristol.

==== Exeter ====
A UOTC was formed in Exeter in the late 1930s, but after supplying officers to the British Army during the Second World War, recruitment fell and the UOTC was placed in suspended animation in November 1947. The UOTC was formed on 1 April 1980 to provide military training for the students of the University of Exeter. Initially based at Higher Barracks, Exeter, the UOTC moved to Wyvern Barracks in February 1988, when Major-General Sir John Acland, its first honorary colonel, opened the Acland Building.

=== Tayforth ===
The origins of the University of St Andrews' links with the military can be traced back to the Jacobite risings of 1715 and 1745, when companies of Militia were raised to defend the pro-Hanoverian University and the City of St Andrews against the absolutist Highland Jacobites. In 1859 a committee was formed in St Andrews to form a volunteer corps of both rifle and artillery. This was carried in a town meeting on 5 December 1859 and was carried unanimously and 3rd (St Andrews) Fife Artillery Volunteers was formed. In November 1908, the St Andrews University contingent of the Officers' Training Corps was formally raised in response to the recommendations of the committee formed by Lord Haldane.

Following the formation of Dundee University from University College Dundee, a part of the University of St Andrews in 1967, the unit became the St Andrews and Dundee UOTC. With the Addition of Stirling University the UOTC was renamed Tayforth UOTC, as St Andrews, Dundee and Stirling Universities OTC was considered a bit of a mouthful. The name Tayforth was chosen as Dundee is situated on the River Tay and Stirling on the River Forth. The concern at the time was that St Andrews, as the senior university might not agree with this name, however as the River Tay and the River Forth are the boundaries of the Kingdom of Fife, within which St Andrews is located, it was approved by the MEC.

In May 1976, the Old Wyvernians formed as a regimental association for the former officer cadets of St Andrews UOTC. The inaugural meeting of the Tayforth Regimental Association was held on 16 June 1984, and was the first of its kind. Whilst other UOTCs followed the example, the Tayforth Regimental Association is the oldest of its kind. Tayforth UOTC is based at Park Wynd in Dundee.

=== Wales ===
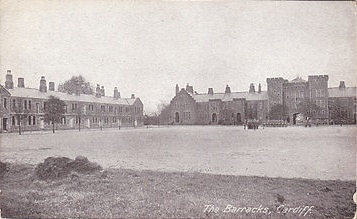
Maindy Barracks, home of Wales UOTC

In 1900 University College, Wales in Aberystwyth raised a company, sanctioned by the War Office, which was known as E Company of the 5th Volunteer Battalion, South Wales Borderers. In 1908, the University College, Wales contingent of the Officers' Training Corps was formally raised in response to the recommendations of the committee formed by Lord Haldane. In 1910, the University College of North Wales contingent followed and, in 1913, the University College of South Wales and Monmouthshire contingent was also raised. The UOTCs of Aberystwyth and Bangor supplied officers to the British Army during the Second World War, but after the war recruitment fell and the UOTCs were suspended in October 1952 and March 1948 respectively.

Meanwhile, the University College of South Wales and Monmouthshire OTC had also supplied officers to the British Army during the Second World War but subsequently developed to become "Cardiff UOTC" and, in October 1990, it became "Wales UOTC". Wales UOTC is based at Maindy Barracks in Cardiff.

=== Yorkshire Officers' Training Regiment ===
==== Leeds ====
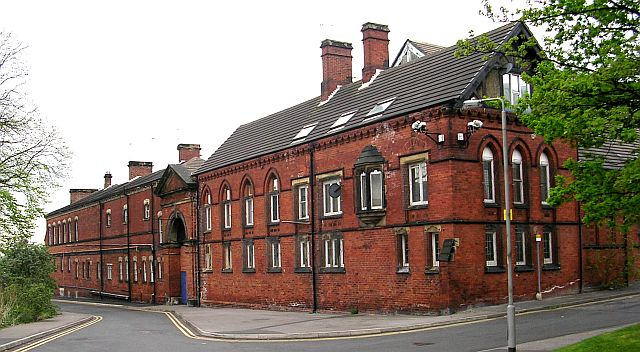
Carlton Barracks, home of Leeds UOTC

In January 1909, the Leeds University contingent of the Officers' Training Corps was formally raised in response to the recommendations of the committee formed by Lord Haldane. The contingent was initially based at Woodhouse Lodge. During the First World War some 1,596 officers were recruited from Leeds University: of these some 328 were killed. The contingent received an inspection by King George V on 27 September 1915. Captain David Hirsch, a former member of the contingent, was posthumously awarded the Victoria Cross for his actions on the Western Front during the First World War.

Leeds UOTC is based at Carlton Barracks in Leeds. Since September 2011 it has formed part of the Yorkshire Officers' Training Regiment.

==== Sheffield ====
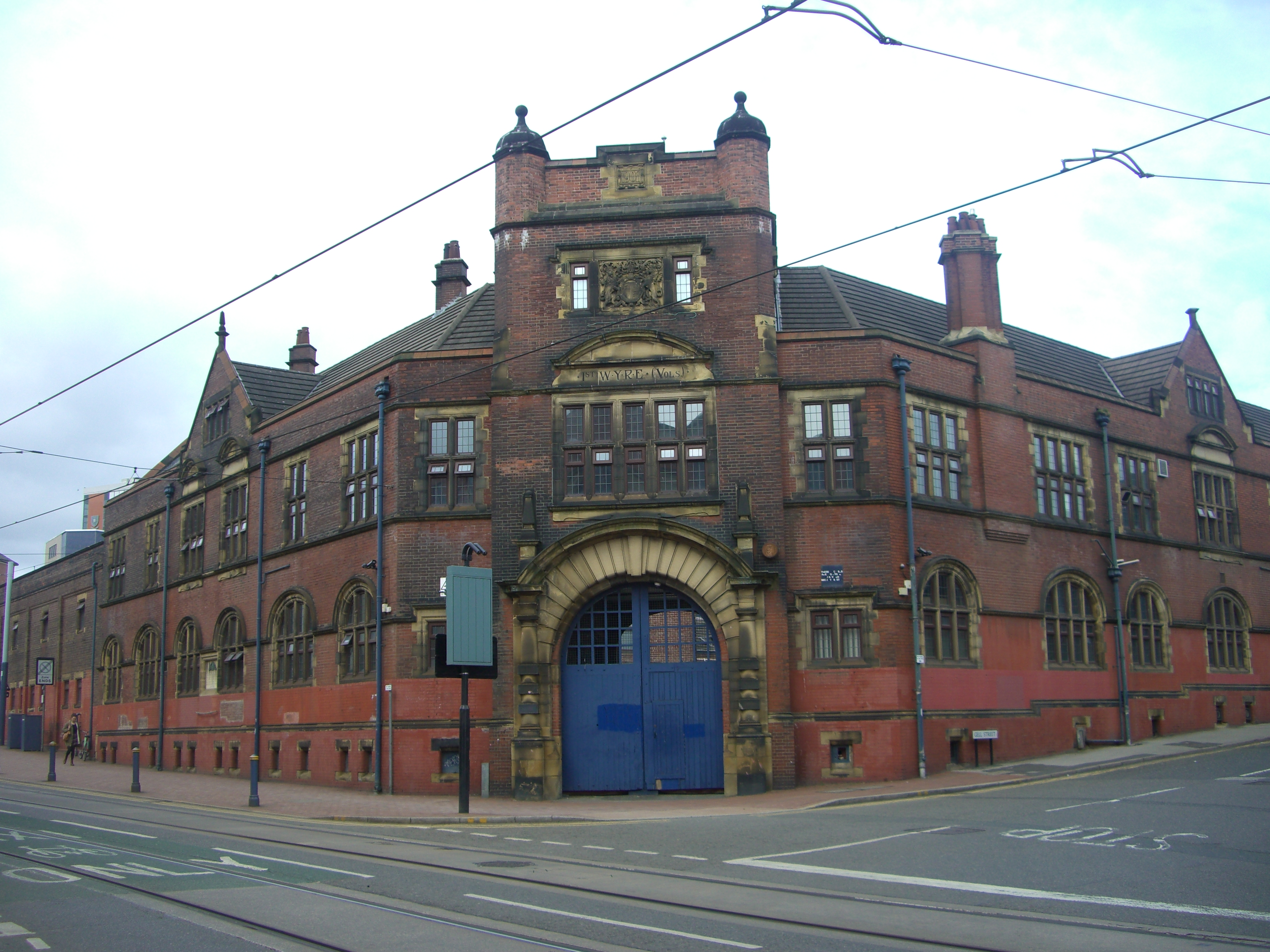
Somme Barracks, home of Sheffield UOTC

In 1900 staff from the University of Sheffield raised a company, sanctioned by the War Office, which was known as G Company of the West Yorkshire Royal Engineers. In 1911, the Sheffield University contingent of the Officers' Training Corps was formally raised in response to the recommendations of the committee formed by Lord Haldane. Lieutenant William Allen, a former member of the contingent, was awarded the Victoria Cross for his actions on the Western Front during the First World War.

From 1969 the UOTC began recruiting students from Sheffield Hallam University as well as Sheffield University. Sheffield UOTC is based at Somme Barracks in Sheffield. Since September 2011 it has formed part of the Yorkshire Officers' Training Regiment.

== Bans ==
In January 1972, at the height of the Troubles, a meeting of 1,500 students at the University of Manchester banned the OTC from carrying out activities anywhere on the university campus.

In March 2008, a motion was passed during the University College London Union's annual general meeting to ban armed forces groups and societies such as the University Royal Naval Unit (URNU), Officers' Training Corps (OTC) and University Air Squadron (UAS) from operating within UCLU locations and events. Through a subsequent motion passed through the Union Council, the decisions made at the annual general meeting were ratified; however, the ban was subsequently overturned by a large majority in following year's AGM of 27 February 2009.

In April 2008 the University of Manchester tabled a proposal to ban military recruitment which also received press attention: however, this proposal ultimately failed.

== See also ==
- University Royal Naval Unit (URNU) - organisational counterpart in the Royal Navy
- University Air Squadron (UAS) - organisational counterpart in the Royal Air Force
- Defence Technical Undergraduate Scheme
- University Regiments (Australia) - The Australian Army Equivalent
- Army Reserve Officers' Training Corps, the United States equivalent
- University Service Units - Ministry of Defence Classification of these Units
- Royal Military Academy Sandhurst - The British Army officer training establishment.
- Army Reserve - The reserve forces of the British Army

== Sources ==
- Allen, Joan (2005). Rutherford's Ladder: The Making of Northumbria University, 1871-1996. Northumbria University Press. ISBN 978-1904794097.
- Beckett, Ian; Bowman, Timothy; Connelly, Mark (2017). The British Army and the First World War. Cambridge University Press. ISBN 978-1-107-00577-8.
- Eltringham, G.J., Nottingham University Officers' Training Corps 1909-1964. Privately published. 1964.
- Errington, Colonel F.H.L., Inns of Court Officers Training Corps During the Great War. Naval and Military Press. New edition of 1920 edition. 2001.
- Hankins, Harold C.A., A History of the Manchester and Salford Universities Officers Training Corps 1898-2002. DP & G Military Publishers. 2002.
- Maj-Gen J.M. Grierson, Records of the Scottish Volunteer Force 1859–1908, Edinburgh:Blackwood, 1909.
- Johnston, Herbert John, The Queen's University (Belfast) Contingent of the Officers Training Corps: Sixty years of the O.T.C.: diamond jubilee 1908-1968. Queen's University OTC. 1968.
- Norman Litchfield & Ray Westlake, The Volunteer Artillery 1859–1908 (Their Lineage, Uniforms and Badges), Nottingham: Sherwood Press, 1982, ISBN 0-9508205-0-4.
- Spiers, Edward. University Officers' Training Corps and the First World War (PDF). Council of Military Education Committees of the United Kingdom.
- Strachan, Hew, History of the Cambridge University Officers Training Corps. Midas Books. 1976. ISBN 978-0-85936-059-3.
- University of London. University of London Officers Training Corps, Roll of War Service 1914-1919. Privately published. 2010. ISBN 978-1-177-07206-9.
- Westlake, Ray, Tracing the Rifle Volunteers, Barnsley: Pen and Sword, 2010, ISBN 978-1-84884-211-3.
- Willoughby, Roger Talbot . Military History of the University of Dublin and its Officers' Training Corps 1910-22. Medal Society of Ireland. 1989. ISBN 978-0-9513869-0-3.
