= Flag of Greater Manchester =

Banner of former Greater Manchester Metropolitan County Council

The flag of Greater Manchester was a symbol of the former Greater Manchester County Council, which administered Greater Manchester, England, between 1974 and 1986. Although the flag's usage has dwindled since 1986, it can still occasionally be seen flying outside key buildings in the city, particularly during special occasions. It was seen flying outside Manchester Piccadilly station in 2014 and at the entrance to the Beetham Tower on Deansgate.

== Greater Manchester County Council ==
Greater Manchester Metropolitan County Council
- Proportion: 3:5
- Adopted: 1974
- Relinquished: 1986
- Design: Gules, ten Towers three two three two, all within a Bordure embattled Or

The flag associated with the former Greater Manchester County Council served as the authority's official banner between 1974 and 1986. It has never been registered with the Flag Institute, which does not record flags for administrative counties other than the historic counties.

The flag was adopted by the county council in 1974 and derives from the shield and crest on the coat of arms of Greater Manchester. Variants of the design are used by several organisations associated with the area, including the former Greater Manchester County Council, the Greater Manchester Fire and Rescue Service, and the Greater Manchester Army Cadet Force.

=== Description ===
The flag is composed of ten golden castles (arranged in rows of 3–2–3–2) on a red background, bordered by a golden band in the style of a castle battlement. The blazon is: "Gules, ten Towers three two three two, all within a Bordure embattled Or".

The ten golden castles represent both the urban landscape of Greater Manchester and its division into ten metropolitan boroughs: Bolton, Bury, Manchester, Oldham, Rochdale, Salford, Stockport, Tameside, Trafford, and Wigan. The red field symbolises manpower and the region's red-brick architectural heritage, both legacies of Greater Manchester's industrial past. The embattled border represents the unity and shared future of the region, as well as and its bold, vigilant and forward-looking character.

=== Usage ===
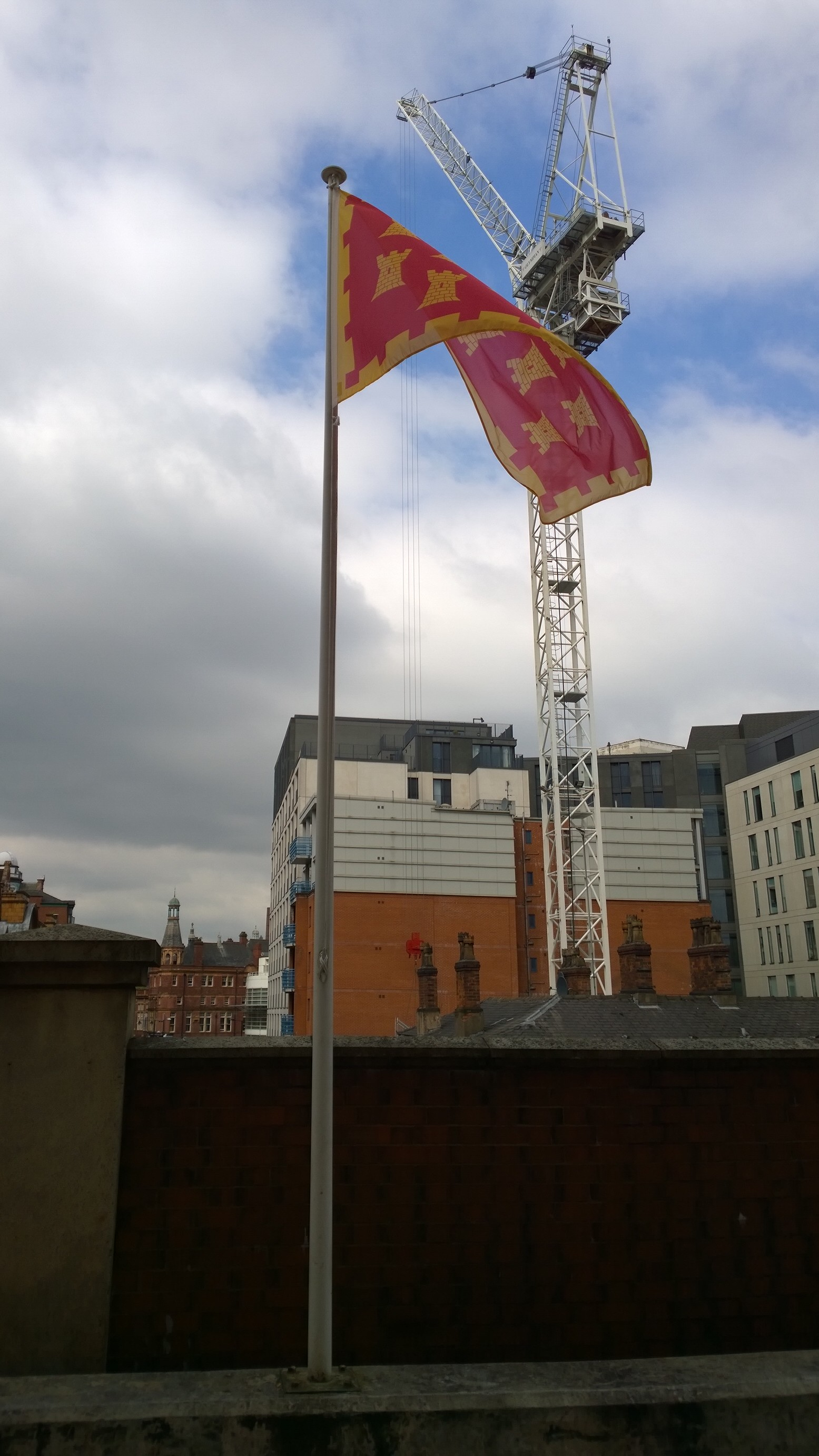
GMMCC flag flying at Manchester Piccadilly railway station

The flag has been reported to have been flown in front of the National Rail offices at Manchester Piccadilly railway station and in front of Rochdale Town Hall.

== Greater Manchester Combined Authority ==
Logo of the Greater Manchester Combined Authority

The current Greater Manchester Combined Authority does not use the symbols of the former Greater Manchester Council, instead using a wordmark consisting of its initials and full title.

== See also ==
- Coat of arms of Greater Manchester
