= Headquarters North (United Kingdom) =

Regional command based in North of England

- Active: 2024—Present
- Country: United Kingdom
- Branch: British Army
- Type: Regional Point of Command
- Part of: Regional Command
- Garrison/HQ: Bourlon Barracks, Catterick Garrison

Headquarters North is the British Army's Regional Point of Command (RPoC) for North West England, North East England and Yorkshire and the Humber. The command administers the reserve units based in its area and also provides the military support HQ for the police and civilian population in the area.

== History ==
On 1 August 2024, Headquarters North East merged with Headquarters North West to form Headquarters North.

== Structure ==
=== Headquarters North ===
- Headquarters North, at Bourlon Barracks, Catterick Garrison
  - Headquarters North Cadet Training Team
  - Cheshire and Isle of Man Army Cadet Force, at Fox Barracks, Chester
  - Cleveland Army Cadet Force, in Middlesbrough
  - Cumbria Army Cadet Force, at Carlisle Castle
  - Durham Army Cadet Force, in Chester-le-Street
  - Greater Manchester Army Cadet Force, in Bury
  - Humberside and South Yorkshire Army Cadet Force, at Driffield Camp, Driffield
  - Lancashire Army Cadet Force, at Fulwood Barracks, Preston
  - Merseyside Army Cadet Force, at Altcar Training Camp, Hightown
  - Northumbria Army Cadet Force, at Fox Barracks, Cramlington
  - Yorkshire (North and West) Army Cadet Force, at Queen Elizabeth Barracks, Strensall
