= Alan Clive Roberts =

British biologist (1934–2021)

Alan Roberts
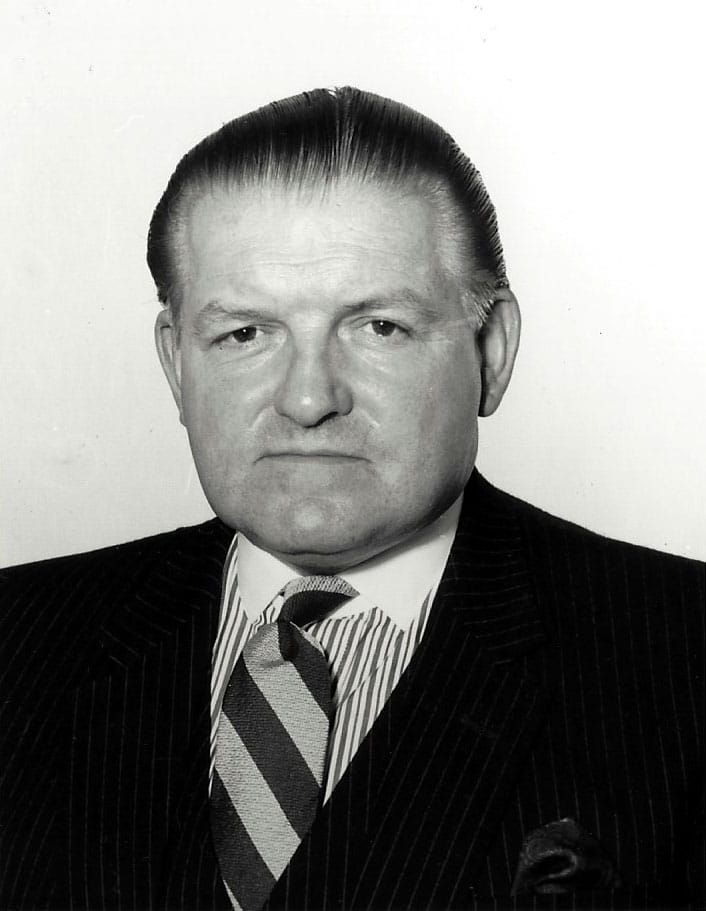
- Born: 28 April 1934; Exeter, England
- Died: 1 December 2021 (aged 87)
- Education: Manchester Metropolitan University; Bradford University
- Spouse: Margaret Mary Shaw
- Children: Martin John Roberts, Adrian Christopher Roberts
- Awards: OBE, Territorial Decoration, Prince Philip Medal
- Scientific career
- Fields: Materials science, biology, bio-engineering, reconstructive surgery
- Workplaces: Manchester Metropolitan University Bradford University

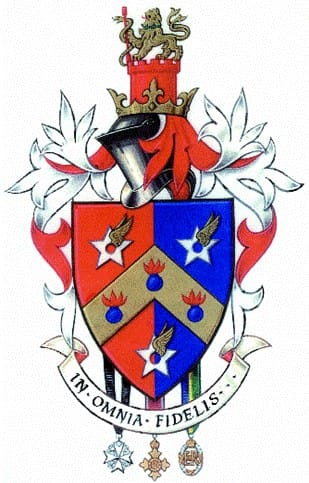
In Omina Fidellis (Faithful in all Things). Coat of arms of Alan Clive Roberts

Alan Clive Roberts OBE KStJ TD (28 April 1934 – 1 December 2021) was a British materials scientist, consultant and engineer who specialised in biomaterials, clinical prosthetics and implants in reconstructive surgery. He specialised in the research, development and the use of tissue adhesives in wound management. He is known by some as the "father of tissue adhesive".

He was awarded the Prince Philip Medal for research in the field of implantation materials in 1970, the MBE in 1982, and the OBE for contributions to science and technology in 2002.

He was director of the Centre for Clinical Prosthetics at the Bradford Teaching Hospitals NHS Trust and Professor of Biomaterials in Surgery at the Academic Surgical Unit of the University of Hull. He was also a consultant clinical scientist at Nuffield Hospital in Leeds, and the head of the Clinical Prosthetics Department at St Luke's Hospital, Bradford. Roberts was former joint director of the Institute of Health Research and was chairman of the National Research Ethics Service from 2006 to 2011. He was Pro-Chancellor and Chairman of the Court and Council at the University of Leeds from 1983 to 2000.

Roberts was a fellow of the Royal Society of Medicine and was its vice-president from 2007 to 2009 and the founder of the Technology in Medicine section of the Society. He was also an honorary treasurer of the society. He was awarded the Honorary Fellowship at the Royal Society of Medicine, its highest honour, in 2010.

Roberts also served with the British Army as part of the Territorial Army, in the Royal Artillery. During his service he served in command positions including being the Commanding Officer of the Leeds University Officer Training Corps. He also served as Chairman of the Council of United Kingdom Military Education Committees.

== Early life and education ==
Born in Exeter in 1934, Roberts was a son of Major William Roberts MBE and Cathleen Roberts. He attended Askam House School and Gregg School in Newcastle upon Tyne and then at what is now Manchester Metropolitan University and at the University of Bradford.

== Medical research ==
Roberts was a scientific officer of the Newcastle Royal Infirmary and completed his research degree (MPhil) in medical materiel. Roberts developed "Silskin" from research in 1992 which was the first universal prosthetic skin with global use in clinical prosthetics.

Roberts' research in 2006 produced a prosthetic adhesive to effectively overcome the difficulty of attaching materials, prostheses and devices to the body with particular reference to colostomy and facial prostheses. He has published numerous scientific papers and books on his subject.

He was a fellow of the Royal Society of Biology, a chartered biologist, a fellow of the Linnean Society of London (FLS) and a fellow at the City and Guilds of London Institute. He was a Companion of Honour at the Institution of Mechanical Engineers. He was a member of the international advisory board at the University of Malaysia Medical School and a former examiner to the University of Sheffield, School of Clinical Dentistry. He was an examiner at the University of Malta medical school in 2004.

Roberts was awarded honorary doctoral degrees from the University of Leeds in 2000, the University of London in 2005, the University of Bradford in 2007, and Brunel University in 2007.

== Military service and affiliation ==
Following national service in the British Army, Roberts joined the Territorial Army in the Royal Artillery. As a reservist, he commanded the Leeds University Officer Training Corps as a Lieutenant Colonel, from 1972 to 1979 before becoming a Colonel and deputy commander to the General Officer Commanding North East Military District.

He was an honorary colonel commandant of the Royal Artillery, as well as honorary colonel of 269(WR) Battery 101 (N) Regiment Royal Artillery and former honorary colonel of a number of reserve units. He was also an honorary aide-de-camp to Elizabeth II from 1980-1984. In 1999 he was appointed Regimental Colonel of Leeds University Officers Training Corps, having previously severed as Honorary Colonel from 1990-1990, and Commanding Officer prior to that.

He was chairman of the Council of United Kingdom Military Education Committees, he served as chair from 1990-1996. In 1997 he became Chairman of Military Education Committee of the University of Leeds and served until 2013.

Roberts served as County President South & West Yorkshire Royal British Legion. He was a county president of SSAFA West Yorkshire and was president of the Royal British Legion Leeds Group. He was also a trustee of SSAFA, The Carmichael Walker Trust and of West Riding Artillery Trust. Roberts was Chairman of the Army Benevolent Fund of West Yorkshire from 1972 to 1975.

== Other service and later life ==
He was a Deputy Lord Lieutenant for the County of West Yorkshire.

Roberts was a trustee of Yorkshire Sculpture Park, Action for Rehabilitation from Neurological Injury (ARNI), Maritime Heritage Foundation (2010). He was president of Leeds District NSPCC, was county president at British Red Cross for West Yorkshire 1986-02. and was Gentleman Usher of Imperial Society of Knights Bachelor.

In 2002, Roberts was awarded the Badge of the Order of Mercy by the League of Mercy Foundation. This is a self-styled order created in 1999 to imitate the League of Mercy that was dissolved in 1947; it is not an official award.

He died on 1 December 2021, at the age of 87.
