= Somme Barracks =

Somme Barracks could refer to:

- Somme Barracks, Sheffield in Sheffield, England
- Somme Barracks, Blackburn in Blackburn, England
- Somme Barracks, Shepparton in Shepparton, Australia
- Somme Barracks, Catterick Garrison
