= Order of Mercy =

Order of Mercy may refer to:

- Order of the Blessed Virgin Mary of Mercy, a Catholic religious order
- Order of the League of Mercy, a British charitable foundation
