= Headquarters North West (United Kingdom) =

Regional command based in North West England

- Active: 2017—2024
- Country: United Kingdom
- Branch: British Army
- Type: Regional Point of Command
- Part of: Regional Command
- Garrison/HQ: Fulwood Barracks

Headquarters North West was a regional point of command based in North West England. The command administered the reserve units based in its area and also provided the military support HQ for the police and civilian population in the area.

== History ==
Under the Army 2020 Refine reorganisation, 42nd Infantry Brigade and Headquarters North West dropped its operational commitments and was reduced to a Colonel's command, becoming Headquarters North West.

On 1 August 2024, the unit merged with Headquarters North East to form Headquarters North.

== Structure ==
- Headquarters North West, at Fulwood Barracks, Preston
  - North West Officer Training Regiment (Army Reserve), at Fulwood Barracks, Preston
    - Liverpool University Officer' Training Corps (Army Reserve), in Liverpool
    - Manchester and Salford University Officers' Training Corps (Army Reserve), at University Barracks, Manchester
  - Headquarters North West Cadet Training Team, at Fulwood Barracks, Preston
    - Cheshire Army Cadet Force, at Fox Barracks, Chester
    - Cumbria Army Cadet Force, at Carlisle Castle
    - Greater Manchester Army Cadet Force, in Bury
    - Isle of Man Army Cadet Force, in Douglas
    - Lancashire Army Cadet Force, at Fulwood Barracks, Preston
    - Merseyside Army Cadet Force, at Altcar Training Camp, Hightown
