= League of Mercy =

British foundation established in 1899

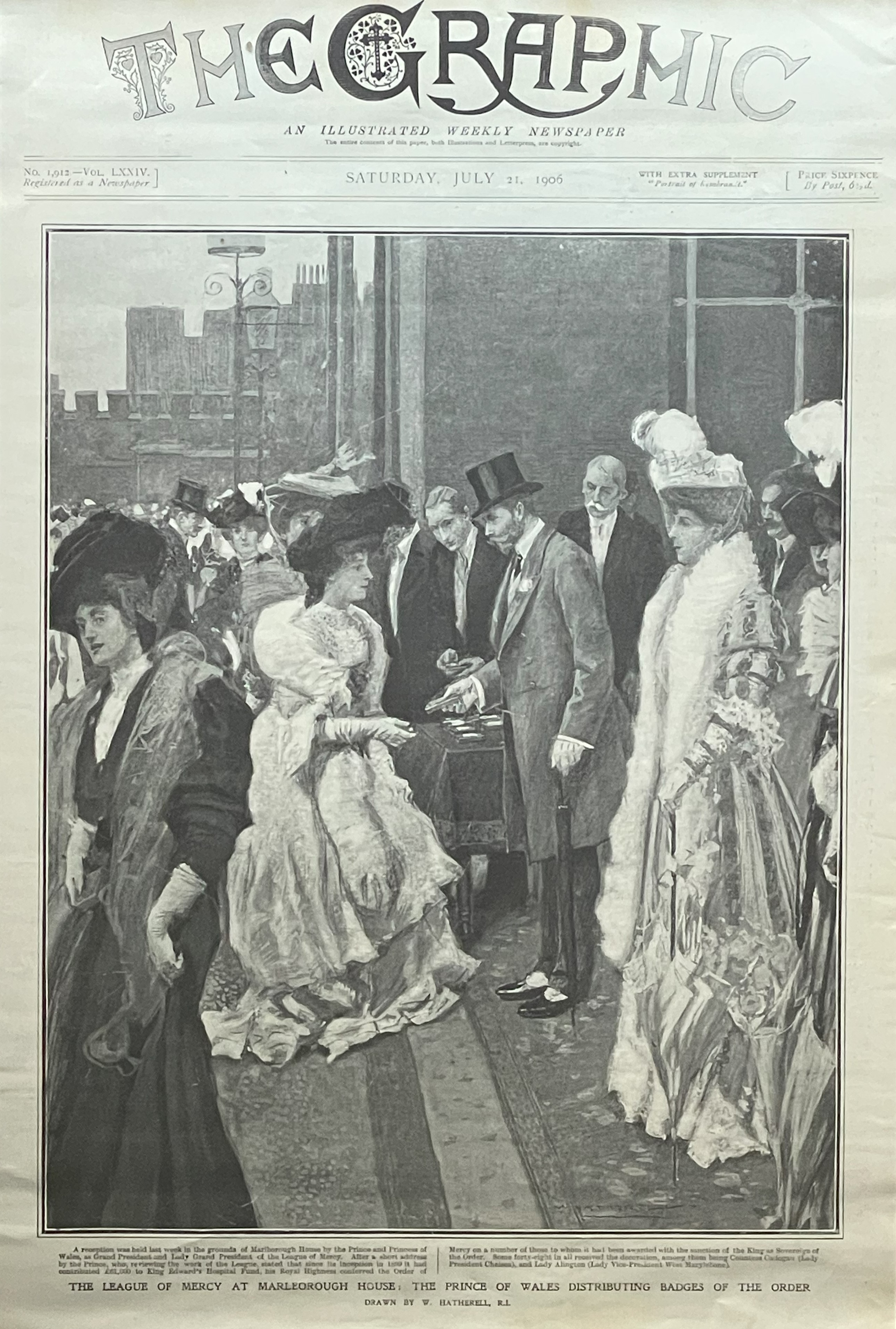
- Investiture of the League of Mercy at Marlborough House by the Prince and Princess of Wales, as Grand President and Lady Grand President of the League of Mercy

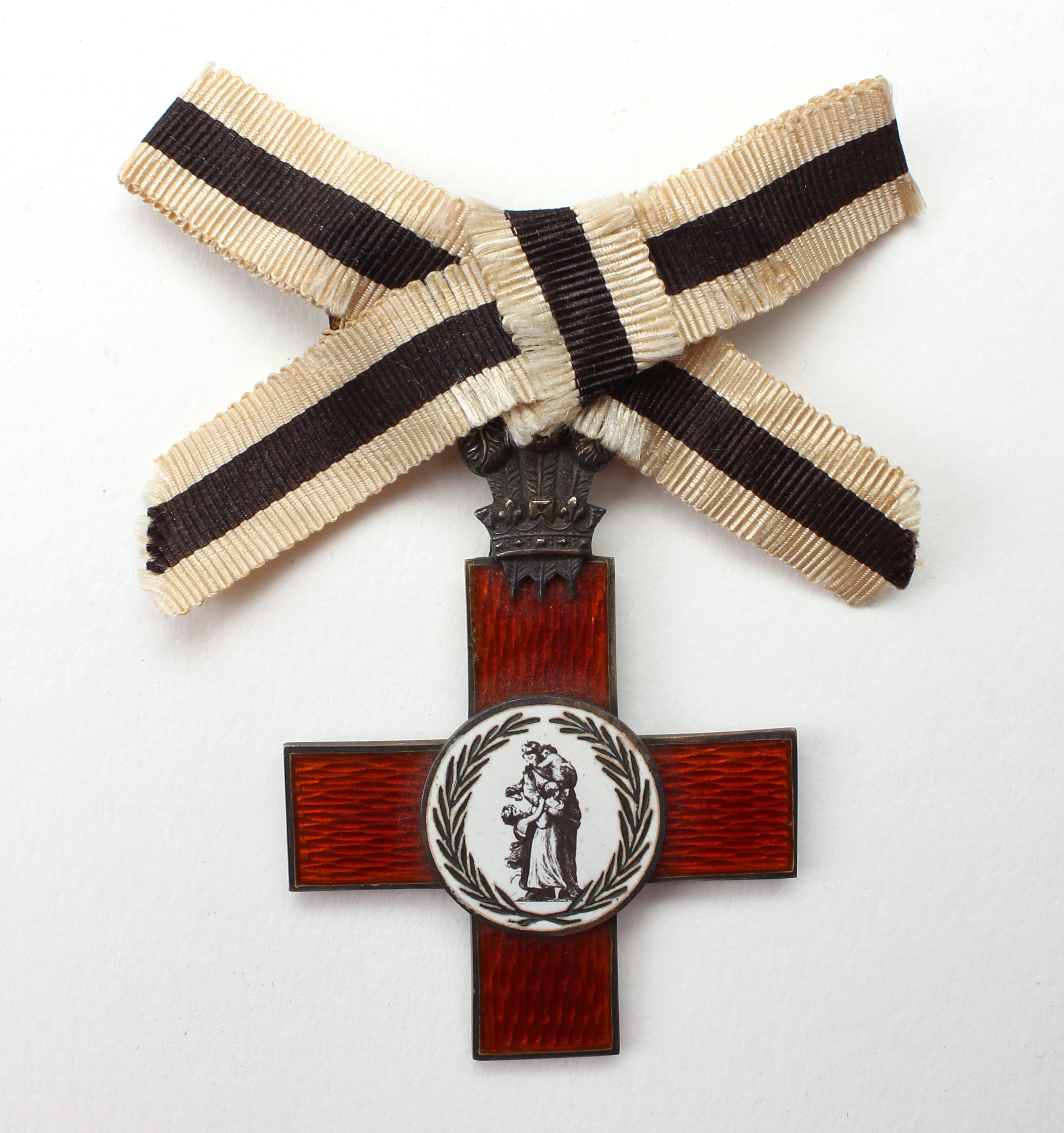
- Badge of the Order of the League of Mercy, version awarded 1899-1946. The bow was for ladies' awards.
- Formation: 30 March 1899; 127 years ago
- Founder: Edward, Prince of Wales
- Founded at: London
- Dissolved: 1947
- Legal status: Charity
- Purpose: To supply funds, recruit and reward volunteers for hospitals
- Headquarters: London
- First President: Edward, Prince of Wales
- Last President: Prince Henry, Duke of Gloucester
- Key people: Lady Grand Presidents: Mary of Teck Mary, Princess Royal and Countess of Harewood

The League of Mercy was a British foundation established in 1899 by Royal Charter of Queen Victoria. The goal of the organisation was to recruit a large number of volunteers to aid the sick and suffering at charity hospitals. It was disbanded at the establishment of the National Health Service in 1947, with its royal charter subsequently surrendered.

In its lifetime it collected a total of £850,000, £600,000 for London Hospitals and £250,000 for rural 'cottage hospitals' with subscriptions being as little as a shilling (12p) a year for servants and tradespeople.

In 1999, the League of Mercy Foundation was established as a charity to recognise and reward volunteers.

== History ==
In 1898, Sir Everard Hambro chaired a committee established to consider several submitted plans and proposals on devising a badly needed organisation.

On 1 March 1899, the Edward, Prince of Wales chaired a meeting at Marlborough House to establish a fundraising body to support voluntary hospitals and announce subsequent directives. Sixty-five districts were established based on Parliamentary constituency divisions, each with a president (grandee) who coordinated the collection of donations through middle class volunteers. Many notable contemporaries were in attendance at the meeting, including the Duke of Westminster, the Marquess of Lorne, the Marquess of Camden, Earl Carrington, Earl of Clarendon, Earl of Dartmouth, Sir W. Hart Dyke, Sir Whittaker Ellis, Sir Arthur Hayter, Sir Fitzroy D. Maclean, Weetman Pearson and Edmund Boulnois.

The Prince stated:

The purpose for which the League of Mercy has been established is to promote the welfare and to further the objects of the Prince of Wales's Hospital Fund for London, and in every way, but especially by encouraging personal service on the part of large numbers of persons to further the interests and to promote the adequate maintenance of hospitals and other institutions for the relief of sickness and suffering, and especially those institutions which are supported by voluntary contributions.

— Edward, Prince of Wales, The Times, 2 March 1899

After being active for nearly half a century, the League ceased its work in 1947 on the creation of the National Health Service, its Royal Charter subsequently surrendered.

=== Presidents ===
The presidents of the original League were:

- Edward, Prince of Wales
- George, Prince of Wales
- Edward, Prince of Wales
- Prince Henry, Duke of Gloucester

== Badge of the Order of Mercy ==
The original badge of the order, awarded from 1899, was a red enamelled silver gilt cross surmounted by the plumes of the Prince of Wales and with a central roundel bearing the crest of the League, the Joshua Reynolds image of ‘Charity’. The reverse is plain, save for the inscription “League of Mercy 1898” on the central roundel. It was awarded for at least five years distinguished and unpaid personal service to the League in support of charity hospitals, or in the relief of suffering, poverty or distress. A bar for a second award was introduced in 1917. The Order ceased to be awarded after 1946, and the League itself closed in 1947.

Membership and an accompanying certificate were given to volunteers who signed up to recruit donations from 20 people per year.

In the United Kingdom, the pre-1947 Badge comes after the Service Medal of the Order of St John and before the Voluntary Medical Service Medal in the order precedence.

== League of Mercy Foundation ==
The League of Mercy Foundation
- Seal of The League of Mercy Foundation, the figure of 'Charity' by Joshua Reynolds.

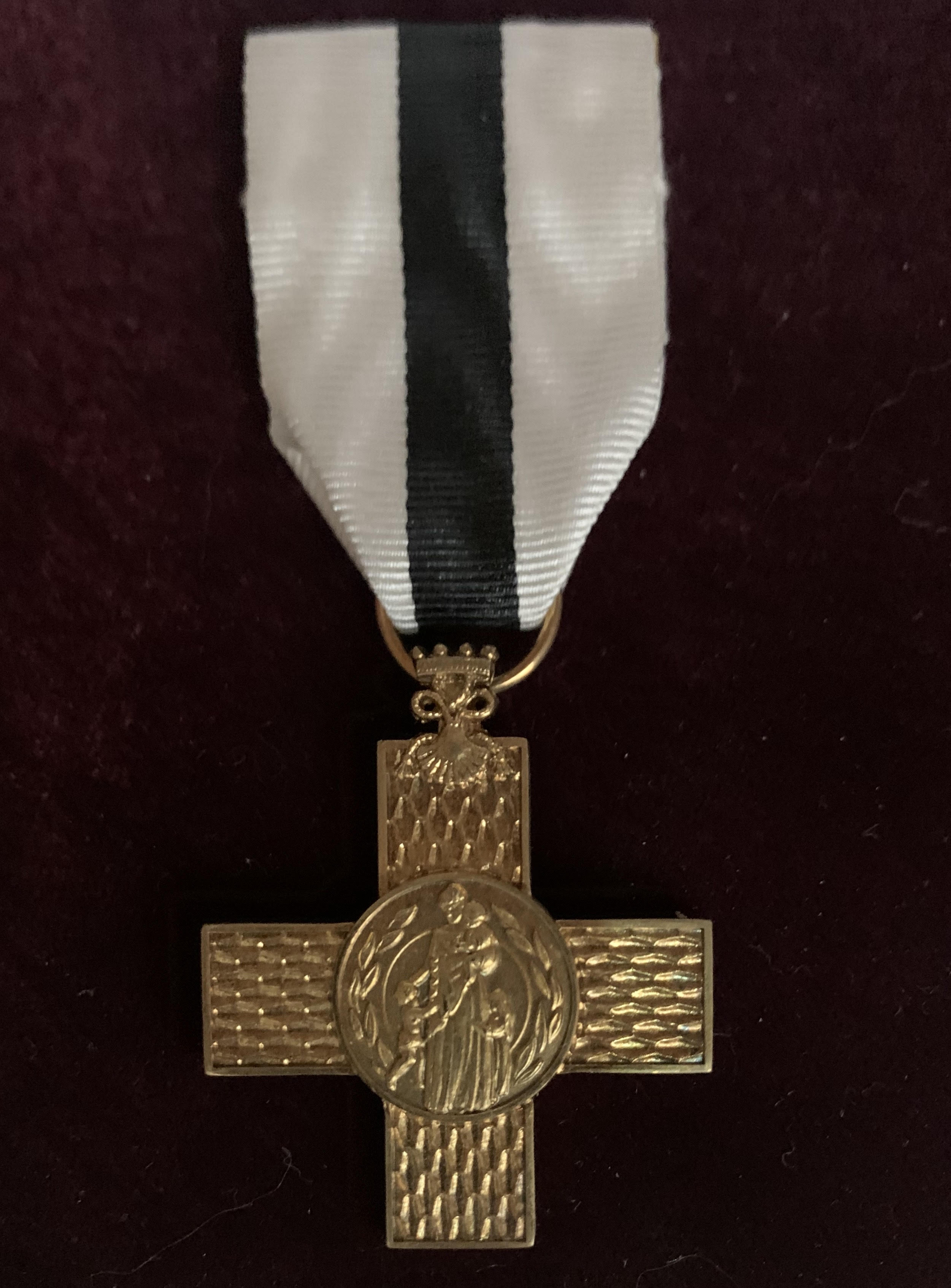
- Predecessor: League of Mercy
- Formation: 30 March 1999; 27 years ago
- Legal status: Charity
- Purpose: To reward distinguished voluntary service in health and social care.
- Headquarters: Surrey
- President: The Lord Lingfield
- Website: www.leagueofmercy.co.uk

The League of Mercy Foundation was established as a charity on 30 March 1999, exactly 100 years after the founding of the original League. Its role is to recognise and encourage outstanding voluntary work in the care of the sick, injured or disabled, young people who are at risk, the homeless, the elderly or the dying. Volunteers’ nominations may be made only by charitable organisations in these fields. Other than having the same name and ethos, there is no formal connection between the original League of Mercy and the Foundation.

=== Awards ===
==== Order of Mercy medal ====
The Foundation re-established the Order of Mercy with a similar medal design, but in silver gilt and without enamel or the Prince of Wales's plumes. The reverse follows the earlier version, but now shows the year “1999”. The Foundation established an annual award ceremony at the Mansion House in the City of London, at which approximately 25 people with at least ten years of volunteering receive the award "as a reward for personal services gratuitously rendered in connection with the purposes for which the League was established."

===== Recipients =====
Recipients for the 1999 Order of Mercy are nominated by charitable organisations only and comprise predominately long-serving community volunteers in the UK. Recipients include Betty Boothroyd, Baroness Boothroyd, Dame Norma Major, and Ian McColl, Baron McColl of Dulwich. Recipients of the Companion of the Order include Peter Galloway, and heads of former ruling houses including Prince David Bagrationi of Georgia, and Prince Carlo, Duke of Castro of Bourbon-Two Sicilies, which, in return, have bestowed dynastic orders upon the then League's president, Lord Lingfield.

Professor Alan Clive Roberts a former pro-chancellor of Leeds University was appointed a Companion of the Order of Mercy in 2002, having previously received an honorary doctorate from Brunel University, whose pro-chancellor was Lord Lingfield. Professor Roberts also served as gentleman usher of the Imperial Society of Knights Bachelor, whose Knight Principal is Lord Lingfield.

Other recipients include Hon. Thomas Balchin, Lord Lingfield's son, for his work for the Action for Rehabilitation and Neurological Injury (ARNI) charity, who also serves as secretary to the Trustees of the League of Mercy, and Anthony Bailey.

==== Distinguished Community Service Medal for Cadets ====
In 2021, the League of Mercy established its Distinguished Community Service Medal for Army Cadets, later extending it to cadets of the other services. Cadet Sergeant Jordan Latcham of the Durham Army Cadet Force was the first recipient of this Medal.

=== Legitimacy ===
The League of Mercy Foundation claims to be the legitimate successor of the original League, however lacks official approval from the monarch. In the United Kingdom, where legitimacy of any particular order is determined by the monarch – some societies have permission from the monarch to award medals, but these are to be worn on the right side of the chest. No UK citizen may accept and wear an award without the sovereign's permission. Moreover, the government is explicit that permission for foreign awards conferred by private societies or institutions will not be granted. The 1999 Badge of the Foundation, not being a Sovereign or State award, is not part of the official Order of Wear of the United Kingdom. This only applies to those awards made prior to June 1947 when the League's royal charter was surrendered.
