= North West Officers' Training Regiment =

North West Officers’ Training Regiment
- Active: Combined 2011 – present
- Allegiance: United Kingdom
- Branch: British Army
- Type: Training
- Role: Officers’ Training Regiment
- Part of: Army Individual Training Command; Army Reserves (Group B)
- Garrison/HQ: University Barracks, Boundary lane, Manchester, M15 6DH

Commanders
- Current commander: Lt Col Graham Rainey

North West Officers' Training Regiment (NWOTR) is a British Army Reserve regiment of the Officers’ Training Corps in North West, England.

The NWOTR is part of the Army Reserve and comprises the two Officers' Training Corps units of Liverpool and Lancaster UOTC & Manchester and Salford UOTC, in order to cater for the Wider North West of England Area. It has about 300 students from across northwest cities. Two officer cadets from the regiment took part in an international military skills competition at the Heroic Military Academy in Mexico in 2017.

It recruits from the following universities:

North West Officers' Training Regiment
Liverpool and Lancaster UOTC	Manchester and Salford UOTC
University of Liverpool	University of Manchester
Liverpool John Moores University	Manchester Metropolitan University
Liverpool Hope University	University of Salford
Edge Hill University	
Lancaster University	
University of Cumbria	
