= William Barnsley Allen =

British medical officer and recipient of the Victoria Cross (1892-1933)

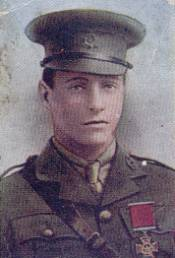
- William Barnsley Allen as portrayed on a Gallaher cigarette card
- Born: 2 June 1892; Sheffield, West Riding of Yorkshire, England
- Died: 27 August 1933 (aged 41); Bracklesham, Sussex, England
- Military career
- Allegiance: United Kingdom
- Branch: British Army
- Service years: 1914–1923
- Rank: Major
- Units: Royal Army Medical Corps
- Conflicts: First World War: Western Front; Battle of the Somme (WIA); Hundred Days Offensive (WIA)
- Awards: Victoria Cross; Companion of the Distinguished Service Order; Military Cross & Bar; Mentioned in Despatches

William Barnsley Allen (8 June 1892 – 27 August 1933) was a British Army medical officer who was decorated for gallantry four times during the First World War, including an award of the Victoria Cross, the highest award for gallantry in the face of the enemy that can be awarded to British and Commonwealth forces.

== Early life ==
Allen attended St Cuthbert's College, now Worksop College, then studied medicine at Sheffield University in the West Riding of Yorkshire. He graduated MB and ChB in 1914 and joined the Royal Army Medical Corps a few days after the United Kingdom declared war on Germany. He was commissioned as a lieutenant, and attached to the 3rd West Riding Field Ambulance.

== First World War ==
In September 1916 Allen, by then promoted to captain, was awarded the Military Cross for actions on unspecified dates:

For conspicuous gallantry and devotion to duty. He was telephoned for when an artilleryman was severely wounded, and came in at once over ground which was being heavily shelled at the time. On another occasion he did similar fine work under heavy shell fire.

On 3 September 1916 Allen was attached to the 246th (West Riding) Brigade, Royal Field Artillery, near Mesnil, France, when the following event took place for which he was awarded the Victoria Cross "for most conspicuous bravery and devotion to duty":

When gun detachments were unloading H.E. ammunition from wagons which had just come up, the enemy suddenly began to shell the battery position. The first shell fell on one of the limbers, exploded the ammunition and caused several casualties.

Captain Allen saw the occurrence and at once, with utter disregard of danger, ran straight across the open, under heavy shell fire, commenced dressing the wounded, and undoubtedly by his promptness saved many of them from bleeding to death.

He was himself hit four times during the first hour by pieces of shells, one of which fractured two of his ribs, but he never even mentioned this at the time, and coolly went on with his work till the last man was dressed and safely removed.

He then went over to another battery and tended a wounded officer. It was only when this was done that he returned to his dug-out and reported his own injury.

In 1917 Allen was awarded a Bar to his Military Cross:

For conspicuous gallantry and devotion to duty. During an intense bombardment of a town with high explosive and gas shells, he left the Advance Dressing Station to search for wounded men. Hearing that there were some in a remote part of the town, he proceeded there, collected them, and supervised their removal to the Dressing Station. On his return, hearing that a party under another Officer had not come in, he was on the point of starting out again to look, for them when they appeared. Although seriously gassed, he continued to perform his duties with the greatest devotion and gallantry, until eventually evacuated to the Casualty Clearing Station.

For actions in October 1918 Allen (by then acting major) was appointed a Companion of the Distinguished Service Order:

For conspicuous gallantry and devotion to duty during the fighting west of Saulzoir for the Selle River line between 11 and 14 October 1918. He showed a very high degree of fearless initiative in organising the collection of wounded from ground under continuous hostile shell fire, and by his inspiring example, untiring energy and contempt of danger, he was able to move large numbers of helpless wounded from positions of danger before he was himself gassed.

He also received a mention in despatches at the end of the war.

Allen died of an accidental drug overdose in 1933.

== Legacy ==
His Victoria Cross is displayed at the Army Medical Services Museum in Mytchett, Surrey.

Allen was a member of Sheffield University Officers Training Corps while he was studying medicine. Just off the main mess in the Somme Barracks, home of Sheffield UOTC, there is an ante-room named the "Allen VC Room" which proudly displays on the wall a framed photograph of William, along with the citation as well as a copy of his VC and several of his other medals.

On 3 September 2016, 100 years after he received the Victoria Cross, a commemorative plaque was unveiled in his memory at the Sheffield War Memorial in Barkers' Pool.

== Sources ==
- Gliddon, Gerald (2011) [1991]. Somme 1916. VCs of the First World War. The History Press. ISBN 978-0-7524-6303-2.
- Willian Barnsley Allen Biography
- ALLEN, Major William Barnsley, Who Was Who, A & C Black, 1920–2008; online edn, Oxford University Press, Dec 2007, retrieved 19 November 2012
- Whitworth, Alan (2012). Yorkshire VCs. Pen and Sword Books. ISBN 978-1-84884-778-1.
