= Carlton Barracks =

Military installation in West Yorkshire, England

- Carlton Gate, Woodhouse, Leeds
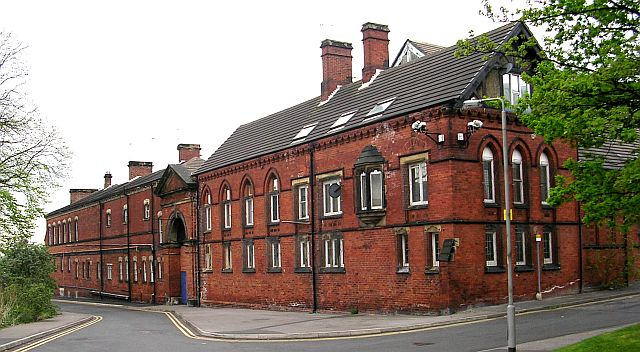
- Carlton Barracks

Site information
- Type: Barracks
- Owner: Ministry of Defence
- Operator: British Army

Location
- Location within West Yorkshire
- Coordinates: 53.80594°N 1.54594°W

Site history
- Built: 1865
- Built for: War Office
- In use: 1865–present

HMS Ceres
- Carlton Barracks, Leeds

Site information
- Type: Stone frigate
- Owner: Ministry of Defence
- Operator: Royal Navy

Site history
- In use: 2005–2015 (as Ceres Division); 2015–present (as HMS Ceres)

Carlton Barracks is a British Army installation in Leeds, West Yorkshire, England. HMS Ceres, a Royal Naval Reserve unit is based within the barracks.

== History ==
=== British Army ===
The barracks were opened as a base for the 4th Battalion of the West Yorkshire Militia in 1865. In 1887 the barracks were bought, with corps funds, to accommodate the 3rd Battalion the Prince of Wales (West Yorkshire) Regiment (The Rifles). In 1908, the 3rd battalion became the 7th and 8th battalions; these new battalions were also based at Carlton Barracks.

At the start of the First World War so many men reported to Carlton Barracks in response to the call to arms that the War Office decided to form two second line battalions (2/7th and 2/8th, the original battalions becoming 1/7th and 1/8th).

After the Second World War the headquarters of 45th (Leeds Rifles) Royal Tank Regiment (TA) was established at the barracks as was the headquarters of 269 Field Regiment Royal Artillery. The former regiment evolved to become the 7th (Leeds Rifles) battalion of the West Yorkshire Regiment, based at Carlton Barracks, and the latter regiment evolved to become a battery now known as 269 (West Riding) Battery Royal Artillery which is still based at the barracks.

=== Royal Navy ===
The former HMS Ceres was a Royal Naval Reserve (RNR) unit in Yeadon, West Yorkshire which was decommissioned in 1995 in the wake of the Options for Change restructuring programme.

In 1999 the decision was made to re-establish a Royal Naval Reserve presence in West Yorkshire and a satellite unit named Calder Division was opened in Batley to train communications ratings, although the temporary nature of the accommodation and limited equipment led to recruitment and retention difficulties. An alternative building, Carr Lodge, was found within Carlton Barracks, Leeds and underwent refurbishment providing modern facilities.

The unit was renamed Ceres Division and was officially opened by Rear Admiral K. John Borley, Flag Officer Training and Recruitment, on 14 May 2005 with a guard paraded by its then-parent unit, HMS Sherwood, and music provided by the Band of HM Royal Marines, Scotland.

A plan to refurbish and extend Carr Lodge was approved with work completed in 2015 on a new two-storey training wing with state-of-the-art classrooms, enlarged changing rooms and an accommodation block with permanent bed spaces. Previous works had added a storage facility and a galley.

==== HMS Ceres ====
On a visit to the unit on 21 May 2015 the Head of the Maritime Reserves, Commodore Andrew Jameson, announced that Ceres Division would be commissioned, becoming the sixth HMS Ceres on 1 September 2015. The unit was formally commissioned on 6 February 2016 by The Princess Royal who dedicated the new facilities. A Royal Guard paraded with the RNR Queen's Colour of the Royal Navy and music was provided by the Band of HM Royal Marines, Plymouth.

==== Affiliations ====
The unit was affiliated to HMS Ark Royal before she was decommissioned in March 2011 and remains affiliated to the Royal Navy Historic Flight, which flies Fairey Swordfish Mk.I W5856, City Of Leeds.

== Units ==
=== Carlton Barracks ===
British Army units based at the barracks include:

- 53 MI Company, 5 Military Intelligence Battalion
- 269 (West Riding) Battery, 101st Regiment Royal Artillery
- 849 Troop, 64 Signal Squadron, 37 Signal Regiment
- B Squadron, 23 Special Air Service (R)
- Yorkshire Officers' Training Regiment (HQ)
  - Leeds UOTC, Yorkshire Officers' Training Regiment

=== HMS Ceres ===
HMS Ceres is home to the following HM Naval Service units:

- HMS Ceres, Royal Naval Reserve
  - Yorkshire Universities Royal Navy Unit
  - Leeds Detachment of the Royal Marines Reserve Merseyside
