= Cleveland Army Cadet Force =

Cadet force county of the United Kingdom

- Active: October 1974 – present
- Country: United Kingdom
- Branch: British Army: Army Cadet Force
- Type: Registered Volunteer Youth Organisation
- Role: To provide pre-training and experience of life in the British Army
- Size: County (Note: In the Army Cadet Force, a 'County' is equivalent to an army battalion)
- Part of: Headquarters North East
- Headquarters: Middlesbrough
- Website: Cleveland ACF

Insignia
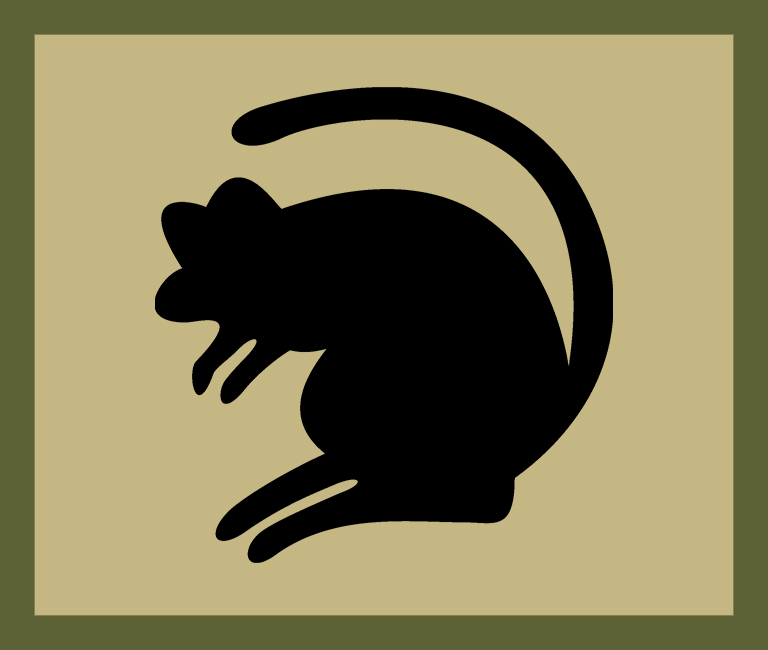
- Headquarters North East Badge

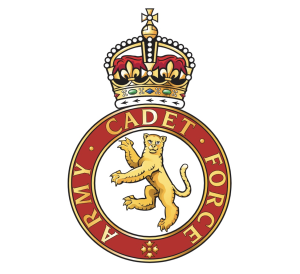
- Army Cadet Force Badge

The Cleveland Army Cadet Force (Cleveland ACF) is the county cadet force for Cleveland that operates as part of the Army Cadet Force. Although the county of Cleveland was disestablished in 1996, the unit still maintains the name and recruits from its former area, which is now part of the North Riding of Yorkshire and Durham.

== History ==
=== Background ===
In 1863, along with the formation of the Volunteer Force, the first government sanctioned cadet groups were allowed to be formed. These groups would mostly be formed in connection with existing volunteer companies and battalions. Following the Territorial and Reserve Forces Act 1907 which organised the former Volunteer Force into a coherent organisation, known as the Territorial Force (TF), the cadets were expanded. Each company consisted of no less than 30 cadets, and four of these companies formed a "Cadet Battalion", the predecessors to the modern "Cadet County".

Unlike their modern successors, the first cadet battalions were administered by their local County Territorial Force Associations, and rarely ever came under an "army command". However, following changes to the organisation of the Cadets, in 1923 all cadet forces were taken under complete control of the County Associations.

=== County ===
Following the Local Government Act 1974, the non-metropolitan county of Cleveland was formed from the Stockton Rural District (Hartlepool) of Durham and the unitary authority area of Redcar and Cleveland of the North Riding of Yorkshire.

The first mention of the 'Cleveland Army Cadet Force' appears in a supplement to the London Gazette dated 22 October 1974 with the first appointment of an officer.

Under the Army 2020 programme, the 4th Mechanised Brigade was merged with 15th (North East) Brigade to form the new 4th Infantry Brigade and Headquarters North East on 1 April 2014. Following these changes, the county left the control of the 15th (North East) Brigade and joined 4th Infantry Brigade as part of Headquarters North East.

As of December 2021, each Army Cadet Force county reports to their local brigade deputy commander, or in the case of independent regional headquarters the commander. However, for administrative duties each cadet county reports to Commander Cadets, who is a senior 1* Brigadier part of Headquarters, Regional Command.

== Organisation ==
Each Army Cadet Force 'county' is in-fact a battalion, and each 'detachment' equivalent to that of a platoon. The Cleveland ACF is currently divided into three companies, with multiple detachments spread throughout the Cleveland area:

- Cleveland Army Cadet Force County Headquarters, at the Coulby Newham Army Reserve Centre, Middlesbrough
- Cleveland Army Cadet Force County Training Team, at the Coulby Newham Army Reserve Centre, Middlesbrough

Detachment	Affiliation	Location	County	Postal Code
A Company
A Company Headquarters	Note: encompassing area from Norton-on-Tees to Hartlepool	Norton Army Reserve Centre, Norton-on-Tees, Stockton-on-Tees	Cleveland	TS20 2QW
Billingham Detachment	The Rifles	Beamish Road, Billingham	Cleveland	TS23 3DY
Hardwick Detachment		Ketton Road, Hardwick, Stockton-on-Tees	Cleveland	TS19 8BU
Hartburn Detachment		Harrowgate Lane, Stockton-on-Tees	Cleveland	TS19 8TF
No. 1 Hartlepool Detachment	Corps of Royal Engineers	Easington Road, Hartlepool	Teesside	TS24 8JY
No. 2 Hartlepool Detachment	The Rifles	Easington Road, Hartlepool	Teesside	TS24 8JY
High Tunstall Detachment	The Rifles	Elwick Road, Hartlepool	Cleveland	TS26 0LQ
No. 1 Norton Detachment	Royal Military Police (Adjutant General's Corps)	Norton Road, Stockton-on-Tees	Cleveland	TS20 2QW
No. 2 Norton Detachment	Corps of Royal Engineers	Norton Road, Stockton-on-Tees	Cleveland	TS20 2QW
Yarm Detachment	Yorkshire Regiment	Kirklevington, Yarm	Cleveland	TS15 9LW
B Company
B Company Headquarters	Note: encompassing the Middlesbrough area	Coulby Newham Army Reserve Centre, Coulby Newham, Middlesbrough	Cleveland	TS8 0TQ
Saint Peter's School Detachment	Royal Corps of Signals	Normanby Road, Middlesbrough	Cleveland	TS6 6SP
Brambles Farm Detachment	Yorkshire Regiment	Sotherby Road, Brambles Farm, Middlesbrough	Cleveland	TS3 8BT
Burlam Road Detachment	Royal Logistic Corps	Burlam Road, Middlesbrough	Cleveland	TS5 5AF
Coulby Newham Detachment	Yorkshire Regiment	Ridgeway Road, Coulby Newham, Middlesbrough	Cleveland	TS8 0TQ
Ingleby Barwick Detachment	Corps of Royal Engineers	Haresfield Way, Ingleby Barwick, Stockton-on-Tees	Cleveland	TS17 5BL
Thornaby Detachment	Yorkshire Regiment	Martinet Road, Thonaby-on-Tees, Stockton-on-Tees	Cleveland	TS17 0AS
Trinity Detachment	Royal Army Medical Corps	Lacy Road, Middlesbrough	Cleveland	TS4 3JW
C Company
B Company Headquarters	Note: encompassing the area from Redcar across to Loftus and Guisborough	Loftus Army Reserve Centre, West Road, Loftus	Cleveland	TS13 4RW
Freebrough Academy Detachment	Yorkshire Regiment	Linden Road, Brotton, Saltburn-by-the-Sea	Teesside	TS12 2SJ
Guisborough Town Detachment	Yorkshire Regiment	Park Lane, Guisborough	Cleveland	TS14 6EU
Loftus Detachment	Yorkshire Regiment	Loftus Army Reserve Centre, West Road, Loftus	Cleveland	TS13 4RW
Normanby Detachment	Yorkshire Regiment	Woodcock Close, Banksfield Road, Normanby	Cleveland	TS3 0TT
Redcar Detachment	Yorkshire Regiment	Wheatlands, Redcar Lane, Redcar	Cleveland	TS10 2PA
Redcar Academy Detachment	Yorkshire Regiment	Redcar Community College, Kirkleatham Lane, Redcar	Cleveland	TS10 4AB
Saltburn Detachment	Yorkshire Regiment	Caravan Centre, Saltburn-by-the-Sea	Cleveland	TS12 1DE

== Notable Events ==
In July 2018, more than 70 personnel from the Cleveland ACF went to Northern Ireland for a chance to win the Duke of Edinburgh's Award, but eight had to be evacuated after being isolated and exposed to the elements. The army later issued a formal apology and stated 'we failed cadets left stranded on mountains'.

== ACF Mission ==
The Army Cadet Force is a national, voluntary, uniformed youth organisation. It is sponsored by the British Army but not part of it and neither the cadets nor the adult volunteer leaders are subject to military call-up. They offer a broad range of challenging adventurous and educational activities, some of them on a military theme. Their aim is to inspire young people to achieve success in life and develop in them the qualities of a good citizen.

The ACF can be compared to their counterparts in the Junior Reserve Officers' Training Corps (USA), Hong Kong Adventure Corps, and Canadian Army Cadets, amongst others.

== Role & Affiliations ==
The Cleveland Army Cadet Force has over 650 cadets and adult volunteers in detachments all across Cleveland.

Prior to 2006, the county was affiliated with the North Yorkshire Regiment (Green Howards). From 2006, following the formation of that regiment, the county was affiliated with the Yorkshire Regiment, except for 4 detachments which are affiliated with the Royal Engineers, The Rifles, and Royal Military Police.

== Honorary Colonels ==
Honorary Colonels of the county have included:

- – 17 May 2007: Colonel A. W. Illingworth TD
- 17 May 2007 – 1 July 2010: Colonel A. Wilson OBE DL
- 1 July 2010 – before 1 July 2017 (vacant till then): Mr. Alasdair MacConachie OBE DL
- 1 July 2017 – 1 July 2020: Mr. Richard Kilty
- 1 July 2020 – September 2025: Colonel V. B. Jassal TD DL
- 15 September 2025 – present: Mr. Grant Glendinning

== See also ==
- List of Army Cadet Force units
- Combined Cadet Force
