= Somme Barracks, Sheffield =

Barracks in South Yorkshire, England

Somme Barracks
- Sheffield
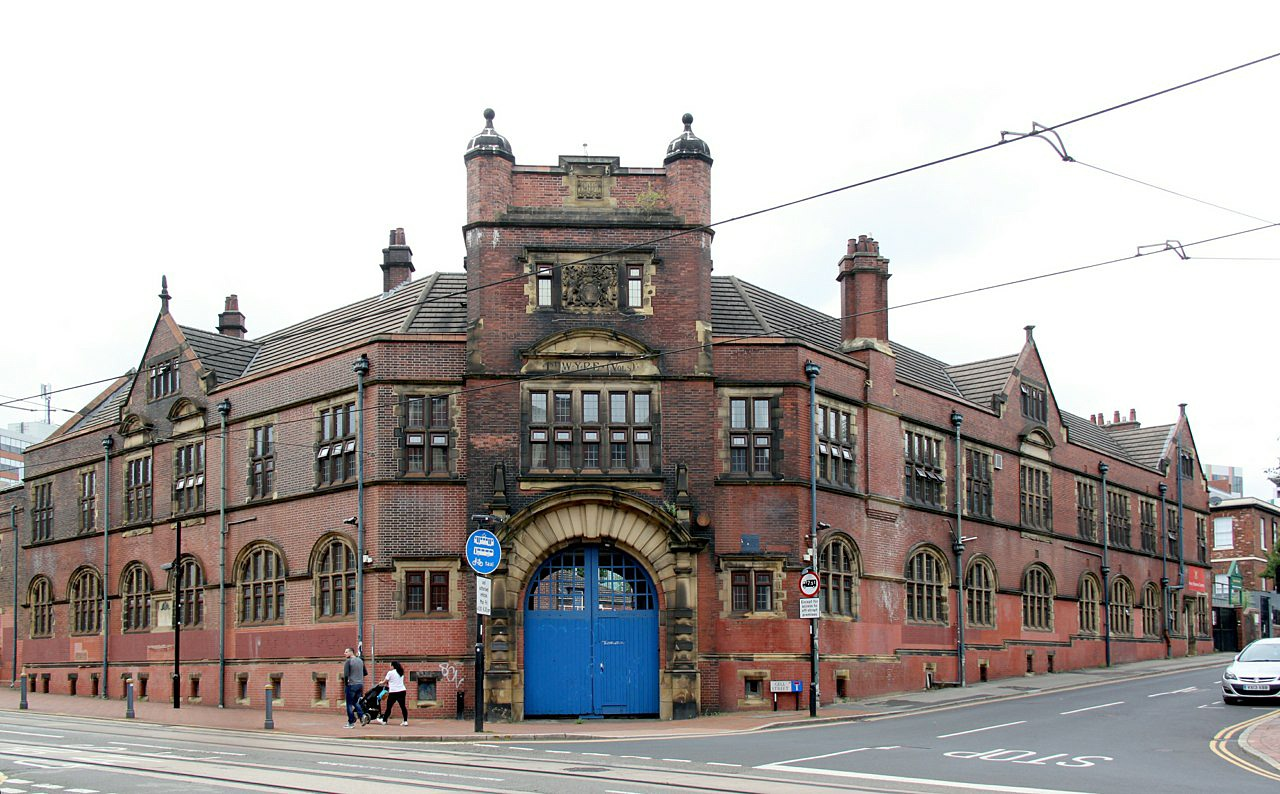
- Somme Barracks

Site information
- Type: Barracks
- Owner: Ministry of Defence
- Operator: British Army

Location
- Location within South Yorkshire
- Coordinates: 53°22′49″N 01°29′01″W

Site history
- Built: 1907
- Built for: War Office
- In use: 1907-Present

Garrison information
- Occupants: Sheffield Officer Training Corps (1911–2011); Yorkshire Officers' Training Regiment (Since 2011)

Somme Barracks, Sheffield is a military establishment on Glossop Road in Sheffield, England. The building is owned by the Ministry of Defence and serves as the base of the University of Sheffield Officers' Training Corps, which has been a part of the Yorkshire Officers' Training Regiment since 2011. It is a Grade II listed building.

== History ==
The present building was opened in 1907. A military presence had existed on the site since 1882 when the 1st West York Royal Engineer Volunteers moved from their previous headquarters at John Street in the suburb of Highfield into a large house with adjoining piece of land at the corner of Glossop Road and Gell Street. The house was used to accommodate the officers and NCOs while a drill hall was built on the spare land. The new headquarters were soon found to be too small and a decision was taken to build larger premises on the same site. On 11 July 1906 an appeal was launched by the Corps Commander Lieutenant Colonel Edward Tozer to help finance the new building.

The new building was designed by the Corps Quartermaster Alfred Ernest Turnell who was a practising architect and surveyor with offices at Foster's Buildings in High Street. The land was purchased for £3,000 while the building itself cost £6,500. A temporary headquarters was set up in nearby Victoria Street while the new building was being constructed. The new facility provided offices for the Commanding Officer and Adjutant, a large armoury, an armoury Sergeant's workshop, a surgery, an orderly room, a lecture room, a canteen and waiting rooms on the ground floor. The first floor housed the officers' quarters and mess, the NCOs quarters and mess, a dressing room and a billiards room. The quartermaster's stores were in the roof space, with the band room and stores in the basement.

The barracks were opened on 7 December 1907 by Laurence Oliphant Commander-in-Chief of Northern Command. The West York Royal Engineer Volunteers' ownership of the new building was brief, as the Territorial and Reserve Forces Act 1907 had been passed by Parliament earlier in the year and came into effect on 1 April 1908. Under the new act all volunteer forces would become part of the new Territorial Army and their drill halls would be taken over by the War Office. The War Office paid only a fraction of the true value of the building when they took it over in 1908. In 1910 a covered Riding School was constructed there, again financed by the men of the corps.

During World War I the Engineers were formed into the 1st West Riding Divisional Royal Engineers (T), commanded by Lieutenant Colonel Sir Albert E. Bingham, and saw action at the Battle of the Somme in 1916. The headquarters on Glossop Road became known as Somme Barracks in remembrance of this. The drill hall at the barracks has been used for various exhibitions over the years and also hosted regular professional wrestling matches at one time. Up to the early 1990s the barracks were the headquarters of the 106 (West Riding) Field Squadron Royal Engineers (Volunteers) and the University of Sheffield Officers' Training Corps. The Field Squadron moved out and relocated to the newly built Bailey Barracks at Greenhill in Sheffield in 1994 leaving the University Officers' Training Corps as the only unit at Somme Barracks.

== Architecture ==
Turnell built the barracks in the Renaissance style, with the main materials being red brick with ashlar stone dressing. The building is L-shaped, with the two-storey wings running along Glossop Road and Gell Street. The main entrance on the corner of the two streets features a large gatehouse with a five-light window above with frieze featuring the Royal Cypher and the inscription 1st WYRE (VOLS). Most of the windows are stone-crossed mullions. The Glossop Road frontage features a plaque as a War Memorial which remembers men of the corps killed in World War One. Inside the barracks is an ante room of the Officers' Mess known as the "Allen VC Room"; this commemorates William Barnsley Allen winner of the Victoria Cross, who was from Sheffield and attended the University of Sheffield.

== Current unit ==
Only one unit is based at the location:

- Sheffield UOTC, Yorkshire Officers' Training Regiment (Note: As an independent unit, University Officer's Training Corps, from 1911–2011) (2011–present)
