= Durham Army Cadet Force =

Cadet force county of the United Kingdom

- County Badge
- Active: before May 1982–present
- Country: United Kingdom
- Branch: British Army: Army Cadet Force
- Type: Registered Volunteer Youth Organisation
- Role: To provide pre-training and experience of life in the British Army
- Size: County (Note: In the Army Cadet Force, a 'County' is equivalent to an army battalion)
- Part of: Headquarters North
- County HQ: Chester-le-Street
- Website: Durham Army Cadets

Insignia
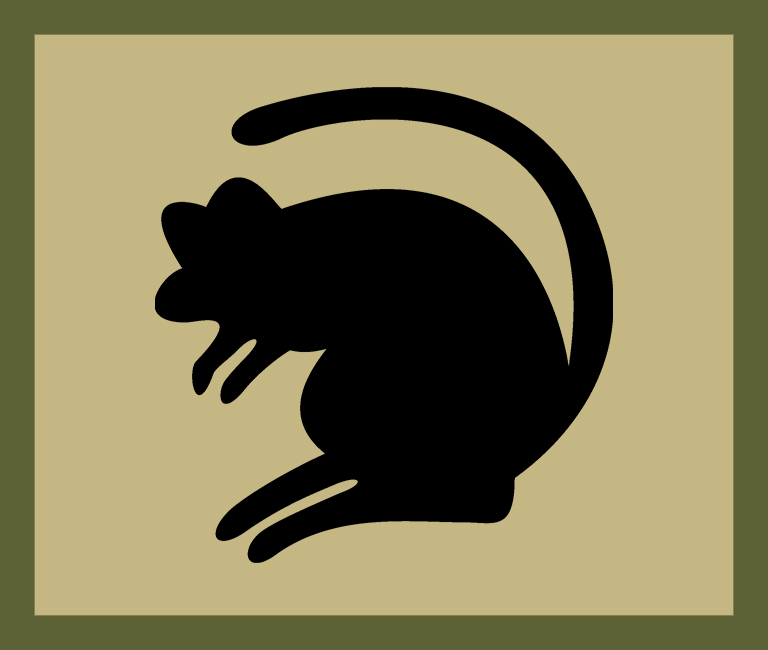
- Headquarters North East Badge

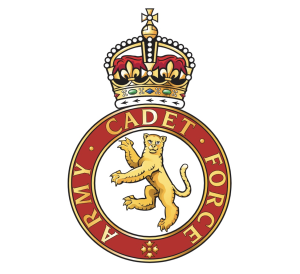
- Army Cadet Force Badge

The Durham Army Cadet Force (Durham ACF) is the county cadet force for Durham, which operates as part of the Army Cadet Force. Since 2014, the county has been part of Headquarters North and comprises approximately 850 cadets and 200 adult volunteers in 41 detachments and four companies, including a band and bugle corps.

== Background ==
In 1863, along with the formation of the Volunteer Force, the first government sanctioned cadet groups were allowed to be formed. These groups would mostly be formed in connection with existing volunteer companies and battalions. Following the Territorial and Reserve Forces Act 1907 which organised the former Volunteer Force into a coherent organisation, known as the Territorial Force (TF), the cadets were expanded. Each company consisted of no less than 30 cadets, and four of these companies formed a "Cadet Battalion", the predecessors to the modern "Cadet County".

Unlike their modern successors, the first cadet battalions were administered by their local County Territorial Force Associations, and rarely ever came under an "army command". However, following changes to the organisation of the Cadets, in 1923 all cadet forces were taken under complete control of the County Associations.

Following the reorganisation of the cadets and Territorial Force in 1908, the following cadet battalions were formed in Durham (almost all affiliated with the Durham Light Infantry):

- 1st County of Durham Cadet Battalion
- Church Lads Brigade
  - 2nd County of Durham Cadet Battalion
  - 3rd County of Durham Cadet Battalion
  - 4th County of Durham Cadet Battalion
  - 5th County of Durham Cadet Battalion
  - 7th County of Durham Cadet Battalion

The first official mention of the 'Durham Army Cadet Force' appears in 25 May 1982 edition of the London Gazette though the county is referred to as the 'Durham and South Tyne Army Cadet Force'.

== Organisation ==
Each Army Cadet Force 'county' is in-fact a battalion, and each 'detachment' equivalent to that of a platoon.

- County Headquarters, Durham Army Cadet Force, at Chester le Street Army Reserve Centre, Chester le Street DH3 3SR
- County Cadet Training Team, Durham Army Cadet Force, at
- Borneo Band and Bugles of the Durham Army Cadet Force, at Picktree Lane, Chester-le-Street DH3 3SR

Detachment	Affiliation	Location	Postal Code
A Company
A Company Headquarters			
Alamein Detachment		34 Dexter Way, Gateshead	NE10 9JJ
Inkerman Detachment		34 Dexter Way, Gateshead	NE10 9JJ
Blaydon Detachment		Blaydon Bank, Blaydon-on-Tyne	NE21 4AU
Felling Detachment		34 Dexter Way, Gateshead	NE10 9JJ
Gateshead Detachment		Elmgrove Terrace, Gateshead	NE8 4HX
Hebburn Detachment		Victoria Road West, Hebburn	NE31 1BX
Jarrow Detachment		Beech Street, Jarrow	NE32 5LD
Seaburn (Martin Leake) Detachment		Dykelands Road, Seaburn	SR6 8DP
Northfield Gardens Detachment		Northfield Gardens, South Shields	NE34 6HH
B Company
B Company Headquarters			
Alanbrooke Detachment		Sunderland Road Army Reserve Centre, Horden	SR8 4NL
Annfield Plain Detachment		Church Street Cadet Centre, Chatchgate, Stanley	DH9 8HE
Barnard Castle Detachment		Stainton Camp, Barnard Castle	DH!2 8UJ
Birtley Detachment		Birtley Land Cadet Centre, Birtley	DH2 LP
Boldon Detachment		New Road, Boldon Colliery	NE35 9DZ
Chester-le-Street Detachment		Picktree Lane Army Reserve Centre, Chester-le-Street	DH3 3SR
Frenchmans Fort Detachment		Londonderry Hall, Dean Road, Westoe	NE33 4EF
Horden Detachment		Sunderland Road Army Reserve Centre, Horden	SR8 4NL
Joseph Swan Academy Detachment		Joseph Swan Academy, Saltwell Road South, Gateshead	NE9 6LE
Redhouse Detachment		Rutherglen Road, Red House Estate, Sunderland	SR5 5LN
Shiney Road Detachment		Herrington Burn YMCA, Herrington Burn, Houghton-le-Spring	DH4 4JW
Shotton Hall Detachment		Shotton Hall Army Reserve Centre, Sunderland Road, Horden	SR8 4NL
Stanley Detachment		Stanley Cadet Centre, High Street, Stanley	DH9 0PW
Sunderland South Detachment		Sunderland South Cadet Centre, Railway Row, Sunderland	SR1 3HE
Sulgrave detachment		Washington Cadet Centre, Sulgrave Centre, Washington	NE37 3BJ
C Company
C Company Headquarters		Gilesgate Army Reserve Centre, Durham	DH1 1JR
Durham Detachment		Gilesgate Armoury, Durham	DH1 1JR
Houghton le Spring Detachment		96 Newbottle Street, Houghton le Spring	DH4 4AJ
Ryhope Detachment		Ryhope	DH4 4AJ
Seaham Detachment		Tempest Place, Seaham	SR7 7BY
Ushaw Moor Detachment		Station Road, Ushaw Moor	RH7 7PY
D Company
D Company Headquarters			
Bishop Auckland Detachment	Rifles Regiment	Saint Andrews Road, Bishop Auckland	DL14 6RX
Churchill Detachment	Royal Corps of Signals	Neasham Road, Darlington	DL1 4DF
Hummersknott Detachment	Royal Artillery	Edinburgh Drive, Darlington	DL3 8AR
Newton Aycliffe Detachment	Royal Electrical and Mechanical Engineers	Greenwell Road, Newton Aycliffe	DL5 4EW
Spennymoor Detachment	Rifles Regiment	Villiers Street, Spennymoor	DL16 6AL
Willington Detachment	Royal Army Medical Corps	Willington	DL15 0QF
CTC Stainton Detachment	Royal Dragoon Guards		

== ACF Mission ==
The Army Cadet Force is a national, voluntary, uniformed youth organisation. It is sponsored by the British Army but not part of it and neither the cadets nor the adult volunteer leaders are subject to military call-up. They offer a broad range of challenging adventurous and educational activities, some of them on a military theme. Their aim is to inspire young people to achieve success in life and develop in them the qualities of a good citizen.

The ACF can be compared to their counterparts in the Junior Reserve Officers' Training Corps (USA), Hong Kong Adventure Corps, and Canadian Army Cadets, amongst others.

== See also ==
- List of Army Cadet Force units
- Combined Cadet Force
