= Yorkshire Officers' Training Regiment =

- Active: Sheffield UOTC 1911 – 2011; Leeds UOTC 1909 – 2011; Combined 2011 – present
- Allegiance: United Kingdom
- Branch: British Army
- Type: Training
- Role: Officer Training
- Part of: Army Individual Training Command; Army Reserves (Group B)
- Garrison/HQ: Carlton Barracks, Carlton Gate, Woodhouse, Leeds LS7 1HE

Yorkshire Officers’ Training Regiment (YOTR) is a British Army Reserve regiment of the Officers' Training Corps based in Yorkshire, Northern England.

YOTR is part of the Army Reserve and is one of the largest regiments of the Officers' Training Corps in the UK, it was created in September 2011 when the Leeds University Officers' Training Corps combined with Sheffield University Officers' Training Corps in order to cater to all university students in Yorkshire:

Its units recruit prospective officers from:

Yorkshire Officers' Training Regiment
Leeds UOTC	Leeds UOTC (York Det.)	Sheffield UOTC
University of Leeds	University of York	University of Sheffield
Leeds Beckett University	York St John University	Sheffield Hallam University
Leeds Trinity University	University of Hull	
Bradford University		
University of Huddersfield		

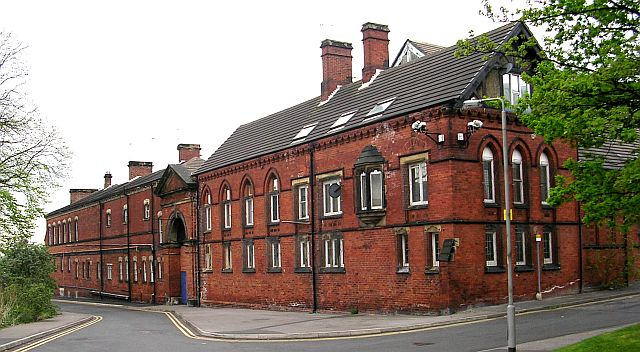
Carlton Barracks is the headquarters of the Yorkshire Officers’ Training Regiment (YOTR)
