= Greater Manchester Army Cadet Force =

Cadet force county of the United Kingdom

Coordinates: 53.6395°N 2.3591°W

- Active: before November 1974–present
- Country: United Kingdom
- Branch: British Army: Army Cadet Force
- Type: Registered Volunteer Youth Organisation
- Role: To provide pre-training and experience of life in the British Army
- Size: County
- Part of: Headquarters North
- County HQ: Manchester
- Website: Greater Manchester ACF

Insignia
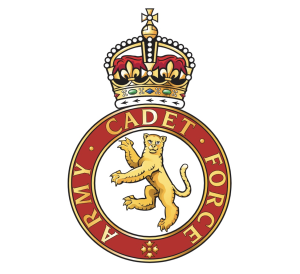
- Army Cadet Force Badge

The Greater Manchester Army Cadet Force (GMACF) is the county cadet force for Greater Manchester, which forms part of the wider Army Cadet Force, a youth organisation in the United Kingdom that offers learning and experiences around a military training theme. It is home to between 1400-1750 cadets and 200-230 adult volunteers in 45-47 detachments.

== History ==
In 1863, along with the formation of the Volunteer Force, the first government sanctioned cadet groups were allowed to be formed. These groups would mostly be formed in connection with existing volunteer companies and battalions. Following the Territorial and Reserve Forces Act 1907 which organised the former Volunteer Force into a coherent organisation, known as the Territorial Force (TF), the cadets were expanded. Each company consisted of no less than 30 cadets, and four of these companies formed a "Cadet Battalion", the predecessors to the modern "Cadet County".

Unlike their modern successors, the first cadet battalions were administered by their local County Territorial Force Associations, and rarely ever came under an "army command". However, following changes to the organisation of the Cadets, in 1923 all cadet forces were taken under complete control of the County Associations.

The first mention of the modern Greater Manchester Army Cadet Force appears in the 19th November 1974 edition of the London Gazette.

== Organisation ==
The organisation of the Greater Manchester Army Cadet Force is as follows in 2021:

Detachment	Location	Area	Postcode	Company	Affiliated Regiment
Radcliffe ACF	Knowles Street,	Radcliffe	M26 4DR	1 Minden	FUSILIERS
Crumpsall ACF	2A Middleton Road,	Crumpsall	M8 5DS	1 Minden	FUSILIERS
Belle Vue ACF	Belle Vue St	Belle Vue	M12 5PW		RA
Levenshulme ACF	Osbourne Road	Levenshulme	M19 2DT	3 Somme	LANCS
Rusholme ACF	Norman Road	Rusholme	M14 5LH	3 Somme	R SIGNALS
Rochdale ACF	Norman Road	Rochdale	OL11 4HS	1 Minden	FUSILIERS
Heywood ACF	Bamford Road,	Heywood	OL10 4TF	1 Minden	FUSILIERS
Middleton ACF	Ashton Lane	Wince Brook	M24 1BN	1 Minden	FUSILIERS
Bury ACF	Castle Street,	Bury	BL9 0LB	1 Minden	FUSILIERS
GMACF Corps of Drums	Castle Street,	Bury	BL9 0LB	All	All
Ramsbottom ACF	Spenleach Lane	Hawkshaw	BL8 4JJ	1 Minden	FUSILIERS
Oldham ACF	Rifle Street	Oldham	OL1 3DN	2 Kohima	RTR
Stalybridge ACF	Off 107 Wakefield Rod	Stalybridge	SK15 1AD	2 Kohima	MERCIAN
Manchester Academy	Moss Lane East	Manchester	M14 4PX	1 Minden	AGC (SPS)
Hyde ACF	29 Commercial Street	Hyde	SK14 2JD	3 Somme	MERCIAN
Royton ACF	Hillside Avenue	Royton	OL2 6RE	2 Kohima	REME
Stockport ACF	Greek St	Stockport	SK3 8AB	3 Somme	MERCIAN
Cheadle Hulme ACF	Oak St	Cheadle Hulme	SK8 5DR	3 Somme	MERCIAN
Bredbury ACF	Goyt Valley Rd	Bredbury	SK6 2JU	3 Somme	MERCIAN
Reddish ACF	Reddish Rd	Reddish	SK5 7JG	3 Somme	MERCIAN
Sale ACF	Walton Rd	Sale	M33 4DR	4 Korea	MERCIAN
Flixton ACF	Pennybridge Ln	Flixton	M41 5DX	4 Korea	RLC
Streford ACF Ruthen Lane	Kings Road (207 Field Hospital)	Stretford	M16 0LU	4 Korea	FUSILIERS
Salford ACF	Haldane Rd	Salford	M50 2TR	4 Korea	RLC
Clifton ACF	Manchester Rd	Clifton	M27 6TA	4 Korea	REME
Collyhurst ACF	Manchester Communication Academy	Harpurhey	M40 8NT	1 Minden	FUSILIERS
Tyldesley ACF	Factory St	Tyldesley	M29 2GQ	5 Anzio	KRH
Wigan GREN GDS	Canal Street	Wigan	WN6 7NQ	5 Anzio	GREN GDS
Wigan QOY	Canal Street	Wigan	WN6 7NQ	5 Anzio	QOY
Hindley ACF	Lord Street	Hindley	WN2 3EW	5 Anzio	KRH
Leigh ACF	Leigh Rd	Leigh	WN7 1QY	5 Anzio	KRH
Failsworth ACF	Oldham Rd	Failsworth	M35 0BH	2 Kohima	RE
Bolton LANCS	Nelson St	Bolton	BL3 2AH	5 Anzio	LANCS
Bolton RA	Nelson St	Bolton	BL3 2AH	5 Anzio	RA
Eccles ACF	Hampden Grove	Patricroft	M30 0QU	4 Korea	RLC
Chadderton ACF	Newman RC College	Oldham	OL9 9QY	4 Korea	RAMC
GMACF County HQ	Spenleach Lane	Hawkshaw	BL8 4JJ	All	All
Broughton ACF	Gordon St	Broughton	M7 1RZ		GREN GDS

== ACF Mission ==
The Army Cadet Force is a national, voluntary, uniformed youth organisation. It is sponsored by the British Army but not part of it and neither the cadets nor the adult volunteer leaders are subject to military call-up. They offer a broad range of challenging adventurous and educational activities, some of them on a military theme. Their aim is to inspire young people to achieve success in life and develop in them the qualities of a good citizen.

The ACF can be compared to their counterparts in the Junior Reserve Officers' Training Corps (USA), Hong Kong Adventure Corps, and Canadian Army Cadets, amongst others.

== See also ==
- List of Army Cadet Force units
- Combined Cadet Force
