= 176th (2/1st Staffordshire) Brigade =

2/1st Staffordshire Brigade 176th (2/1st Staffordshire) Brigade 176th Infantry Brigade
- Active: 1914–1919; 1939–1944
- Country: United Kingdom
- Branch: Territorial Army
- Type: Infantry
- Size: Brigade
- Engagements: First World War Battle of Passchendaele Battle of Cambrai (1917) German spring offensive Second World War Battle of Normandy Operation Charnwood Second Battle of the Odon

The 176th (2/1st Staffordshire) Brigade was an infantry brigade of the British Army that saw active service in the First World War on the Western Front and disbanded in 1919. The brigade was raised again, now known as 176th Infantry Brigade, shortly prior to the Second World War and fought in the Normandy Campaign before being disbanded in August 1944. In both world wars the brigade was assigned to a 59th Division: the 59th (2nd North Midland) Division during the first, and the 59th (Staffordshire) Infantry Division in the second.

== First World War ==
On 31 August 1914, 27 days after the British declaration of war on Germany, the War Office authorised the formation of 2nd Line units for all Territorial Force (TF) units that were being sent overseas. As a result, the 2/1st Staffordshire Brigade came into existence, as a duplicate of the 1/1st Staffordshire Brigade, which was part of the North Midland Division, and was assigned to the 2nd North Midland Division. The brigade (and division) was formed mainly from those men in the Territorial Force who, when asked at the outbreak of war, did not volunteer for service overseas (as soldiers who joined the TF were not obligated to serve overseas). Like the 1st Line formation, the brigade was composed of two battalions of the South Staffordshire Regiment and two of the North Staffordshire Regiment. To distinguish the 2nd Line from the 1st Line, they adopted the '2/' prefix (so a 2nd Line battalion would become 2/5th North Staffs, for example, and a 1st Line 1/5th North Staffs). The original intention of the 2nd Line units was to act in a home service role and to supply drafts of replacements overseas to the 1st Line units.

In July 1915 the division was numbered as the 59th (2nd North Midland) Division and the brigades were also numbered, so the 2/1st Staffordshire Brigade became 176th (2/1st Staffordshire) Brigade.

In April 1916 the 59th Division was sent to Dublin in Ireland to quell the Easter Rising where the brigade suffered its first casualties of the war, from the Irish Volunteers. In the same year the Military Service Act 1916 came into being, stating that all soldiers in the Territorial Force were now liable to serve overseas, if they were medically fit.

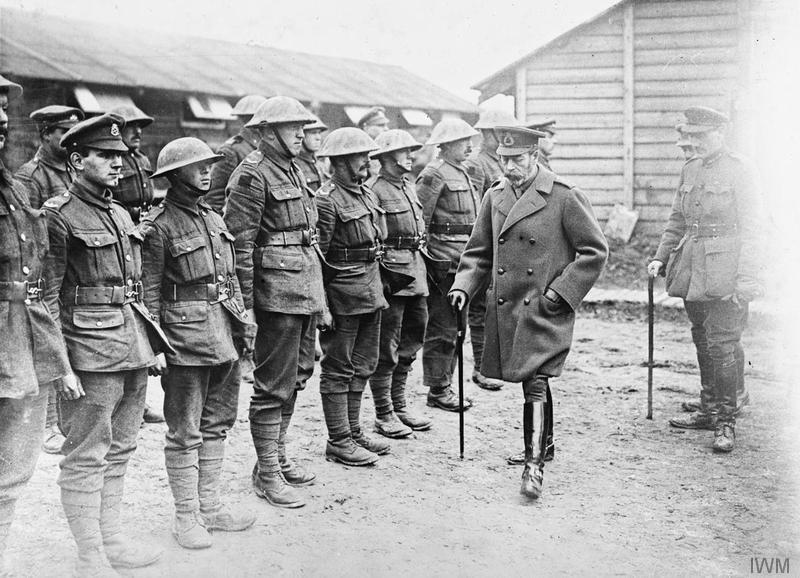
King George V inspecting the remnants of the 2/6th Battalion, North Staffordshire Regiment; Gauchin, 30 March 1918.

The brigade was sent to France in early 1917, with the rest of the 59th Division, to serve in the trenches of the Western Front. The brigade fought in the Third Battle of Ypres, the Battle of Cambrai, both in 1917, sustaining heavy casualties. The brigade, with the rest of the division, was devastated in Operation Michael, the opening phase of the German spring offensive launched by the German Army, in March 1918 and had to be completely reformed, with the original battalions being reduced to cadres and transferred to other divisions and replaced by Provisional Garrison Guard battalions from the United Kingdom.

During the fighting at Cambrai in November 1917, Lance Corporal John Thomas of the 2/5th Battalion, North Staffordshire Regiment was awarded the Victoria Cross.

=== Order of battle ===
- 2/5th Battalion, South Staffordshire Regiment (disbanded 31 January 1918)
- 2/6th Battalion, South Staffordshire Regiment (reduced to cadre 9 May 1918, left 30 May 1918)
- 2/5th Battalion, North Staffordshire Regiment (disbanded 30 January 1918, left 2 June 1918)
- 2/6th Battalion, North Staffordshire Regiment (reduced to cadre 9 May 1918, left 7 June 1918)
- 174th Machine Gun Company, Machine Gun Corps (from 6 March 1917, moved to 59th Battalion, Machine Gun Corps 7–8 March 1918)
- 176th Trench Mortar Battery (formed 20 January 1917, disbanded 8 May 1918, reformed 11 July 1918)
- 6th/7th Battalion, Royal Scots Fusiliers (from 7–10 May 1918, left 18 June 1918)
- 1st Provisional Garrison Guard Battalion (became 17th Garrison Battalion, Worcestershire Regiment 25 May 1918, left 18 June 1918)
- 2nd Provisional Garrison Guard Battalion (joined 13 May 1918, left 22 May 1918)
- 3rd Provisional Garrison Guard Battalion (joined 13 May 1918, left 22 May 1918)
- 4th Provisional Garrison Guard Battalion (became 23rd Garrison Battalion, Lancashire Fusiliers 25 May 1918, left 18 June 1918)
- 4th Garrison Guard Battalion, Royal Welsh Fusiliers (joined 16 May 1918, became 26th Battalion 16 July 1918)
- 25th Garrison Guard Battalion, King's (Liverpool Regiment) (joined 16 June 1918, became 25th Battalion 16 July 1918)
- 5th Provisional Garrison Guard Battalion, Royal Sussex Regiment (joined 13 May 1918, became 17th Garrison Guard Battalion 25 May, then 17th Battalion 16 July 1918)

In late 1917 until early 1918 there was a shortage of manpower in the British Expeditionary Force (BEF) on the Western Front, divisions were reduced from twelve to nine infantry battalions, and brigades therefore reduced from four to three. As a result, in late January 1918, the 1/5th North Staffords was transferred from 137th (1/1st Staffordshire) Brigade of 46th (North Midland) Division where they amalgamated with the 2/5th Battalion and were renamed the 5th Battalion. At the same time the 1/5th South Staffs was disbanded, most of the men going to other South Staffs battalions.

== Second World War ==
The brigade was disbanded after the war along with the rest of the Territorial Force, which was reformed as the Territorial Army in the 1920s but neither the brigade or division were reformed, being formed as a 2nd Line for hostilities-only.

Throughout the spring and summer of 1939 the Territorial Army was doubled in size as the threat of war with Germany was becoming increasingly likely. As a result, the brigade number was reactivated by the redesignation of the 166th Infantry Brigade on 4 September 1939, the day after Britain and France declared war on Germany, thus beginning the Second World War. The 176th Infantry Brigade, composed of two battalions of the North Staffs and one of the South Staffs, was assigned to the 59th (Staffordshire) Motor Division, which was created as a 2nd Line duplicate of the 55th (West Lancashire) Motor Division. The division was originally organised as a motorised infantry division of only two brigades, the other being the 177th Infantry Brigade, which was formed as a 2nd Line duplicate of 176th Brigade. Unlike most Territorial divisions, which were split into an exact 2nd Line 'mirror' duplicate of their parent formation, the 59th, along with two other 2nd Line divisions (the 18th and the 45th), was instead split on a geographical basis, all the units from Staffordshire being assigned to the 59th Division and all units from Liverpool and Lancashire being assigned to the 55th. This came with a considerable downside, however, as it meant that while some units of both divisions could be considered to be trained (the 1st Line units), the other units (the 2nd Line units) were not and as there were 1st and 2nd Line units in both divisions they were both considered untrained.

About a month after the British Expeditionary Force (BEF) was evacuated from Dunkirk in May–June 1940, the 59th (Staffordshire) Motor Division was reorganised from a motorised division (two brigades) into a standard infantry division (three brigades), due to a perceived failure of the motorised divisions in the Battle of France. It received the 197th Infantry Brigade from the now disbanded 66th Infantry Division. Together with most of the rest of the British Army after the events of France and Dunkirk, the division moved to North-East England where they came under command of X Corps and alternated between coastal defence and home service duties and training to repel a German invasion.

In June 1942, the brigade, with the rest of the 59th Division, was sent to Northern Ireland where they were to remain until March 1943, and came under command of British Troops Northern Ireland. Soon after arrival, they took part in numerous large-scale exercises with American troops of the U.S. Army stationed there, including the U.S. 1st Armored and U.S. 34th Infantry divisions, both of which were later to serve with distinction fighting on the Italian Front. Later in the year, in October, the 176th Brigade was reorganised slightly, with the 7th Battalion, North Staffordshire Regiment being exchanged for the 7th Battalion, Royal Norfolk Regiment, which had previously served with 220th Brigade. The 7th Royal Norfolks was a 2nd Line Territorial unit created in 1939 around the same time as 176th Brigade and had seen service in France in 1940 with the 51st (Highland) Infantry Division and had escaped with a mere 30 men, including a single officer.

After training for many years throughout the United Kingdom and nine months spent in Northern Ireland the brigade landed in France, together with the rest of the 59th Division, in late June 1944 as part of Operation Overlord and became part of the British Second Army. The brigade fought in the severe attritional battles to capture Caen, in particular during Operation Charnwood and the Second Battle of the Odon, also known as Operation Pomegranate. In early August, during the crossing of the River Orne in which the 176th Infantry Brigade, supported by Churchill tanks of 107 RAC of 34 Tank Brigade, played a major role (and earned praise from the GOC Major-General Lewis Lyne), Captain David Auldjo Jamieson, son of Sir Archibald Jamieson, of the 7th Battalion, Royal Norfolk Regiment was awarded the Victoria Cross for his extreme bravery, leadership and calmness under fire and despite being wounded. His would be the first and only VC awarded to the brigade and the division throughout the war. He survived his injuries and remained in the Army after the war where he later achieved the rank of major. During the crossing, the brigade suffered heavy casualties, with 7th Royal Norfolks sustaining 42 killed, 111 wounded and 73 missing, for a total of 226 casualties, 6th North Staffords had 76 casualties and 7th South Staffords lost its CO, Lieutenant Colonel J.G. Bullock, killed in action.

At this stage of the Second World War, however, the British Army (and, in general, the whole of the United Kingdom) was suffering from a severe shortage of manpower, specifically in the infantry where the majority of combat casualties fell. By August 1944, the Army fighting in France had absorbed nearly all the available infantrymen still available in the United Kingdom. Consequently, aside from transferring large numbers of RAF, RAF Regiment, Navy and Artillery personnel to be retrained as infantrymen (which to do so would take many months), the only way the Army could find sufficient replacements (aside from the aforementioned method) for battle casualties was by breaking up units in the field in order to bring other field units up to strength. As a result, the 59th (Staffordshire) Division, considered the most 'junior' infantry division of the British Second Army, was chosen by General Bernard Montgomery, 21st Army Group Commander, for disbandment. The brigade and division were both, therefore, broken up in late August and the battalions broken up and sent to other British divisions in order to bring them up to strength.

=== Order of battle ===
176th Infantry Brigade was constituted as follows during the war:

- 7th Battalion, South Staffordshire Regiment
- 6th Battalion, North Staffordshire Regiment
- 7th Battalion, North Staffordshire Regiment (until 14 October 1942)
- 176th Infantry Brigade Anti-Tank Company (formed 13 July, disbanded 31 December 1940)
- 7th Battalion, Royal Norfolk Regiment(from 14 October 1942)

=== Commanders ===
The following officers commanded 176th Infantry Brigade during the war:

- Brigadier J.L. Short (until 23 April 1942)
- Brigadier M.A. Carthew-Yorstoun (from 23 April 1942 until 31 December 1943)
- Brigadier R.W.H. Fryer (from 31 December 1943)

== Victoria Cross recipients ==
- Lance Corporal John Thomas, 2/5th Battalion, North Staffordshire Regiment, First World War
- Captain David Auldjo Jamieson, 7th Battalion, Royal Norfolk Regiment, Second World War

== Bibliography ==
- French, David (2001) [2000]. Raising Churchill's Army: The British Army and the War Against Germany 1919–1945. Oxford: Oxford University Press. ISBN 978-0-19-924630-4.
- Joslen, H. F. (2003) [1960]. Orders of Battle: Second World War, 1939–1945. Uckfield, East Sussex: Naval and Military Press. ISBN 978-1-84342-474-1.
- Buckley, J. (2013). Monty's Men: The British Army and the Liberation of Europe (2014 ed.). London: Yale University Press. ISBN 978-0-300-20534-3.
- Hart, S. A. (2007) [2000]. Colossal Cracks: Montgomery's 21st Army Group in Northwest Europe, 1944–45. Mechanicsburg PA: Stackpole Books. ISBN 0-8117-3383-1.
- Perry, Frederick William (1988). The Commonwealth Armies: Manpower and Organisation in Two World Wars. War, Armed Forces and Society. Manchester: Manchester University Press. ISBN 978-0-7190-2595-2.
