= College Road =

College Road may refer to:

- A2212 road, in London, England
- College Road, Hong Kong, Kowloon City, Hong Kong
- College Road drill hall, a former military installation at College Road (formerly Victoria Road) in Hanley, Stoke-on-Trent, Staffordshire
- College Road (film), a 2022 Indian Tamil-language drama film
- College Road Trip, a 2008 American family comedy film
- North Carolina Highway 132, known as College Road in Wilmington, North Carolina
