= The Old Barracks, Newcastle-under-Lyme =

Barracks in Newcastle-under-Lyme, Staffordshire, England

The Old Barracks
- Newcastle-under-Lyme
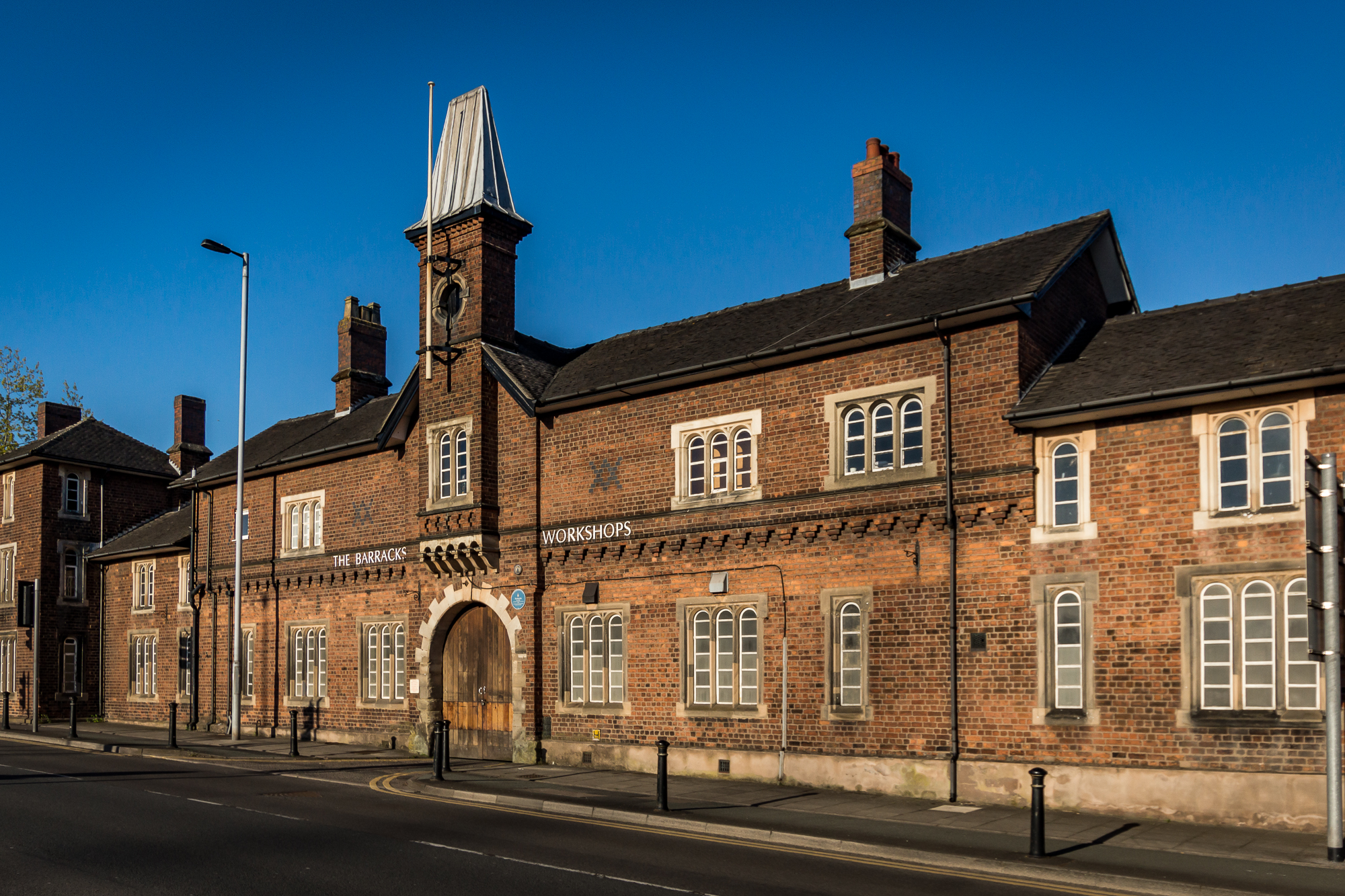
- The Old Barracks

Site information
- Type: Barracks

Location
- Location within Staffordshire
- Coordinates: 53.0099°N 2.2240°W

Site history
- Built: 1855
- Built for: War Office
- In use: 1855-1950s

Listed Building – Grade II
- Designated: 27 September 1972
- Reference no.: 1291465

The Old Barracks is a former military installation in Barrack Road, Newcastle-under-Lyme, England. It is a Grade II listed building.

== History ==
The building was designed in the Italianate style as a barracks for the North Staffordshire Militia and completed in 1855. It was initially used by G Company of the 2nd Staffordshire Rifle Volunteer Corps which evolved to become The King's Own (3rd Staffordshire) Rifles Militia before being renamed the 4th (Militia) Battalion in 1881. The building was acquired by Major W. H. Dalton, of the Staffordshire Rangers, and placed in trust for military use in 1882. The unit evolved to become G Company of the 5th Battalion of the North Staffordshire Regiment in 1908. The building continued to be used by Territorial Army units until after the Second World War; since the 1950s the building has been used by Remploy as workshops for disabled people.
