= 83rd Searchlight Regiment, Royal Artillery =

83rd Searchlight Regiment, RA
- Royal Artillery cap badge
- Active: 23 January 1941 – 10 December 1944
- Country: United Kingdom
- Branch: British Army
- Type: Searchlight Regiment
- Role: Air Defence
- Size: 3–4 Batteries
- Part of: Anti-Aircraft Command
- Engagements: The Blitz; Baby Blitz; Operation Diver

83rd Searchlight Regiment (83rd S/L Rgt) was an air defence unit of Britain's Royal Artillery during World War II. It protected the United Kingdom as part of Anti-Aircraft Command from the Blitz of 1940 until the V-1 flying bomb offensive in 1944.

== Origin ==
The regiment was created as part of the rapid expansion of anti-aircraft (AA) defences during The Blitz. It was formed at Yeovil (probably by 220th S/L Training Regiment) on 23 January 1941 with three batteries, 513, 514 and 515. After training, the new regiment joined 1st AA Brigade. This was a Regular Army formation that had served in the Battle of France and then been evacuated from Dunkirk. Back in the UK, the headquarters was redeployed to 11th AA Division of AA Command to cover the industrial area round the industrial areas round Crewe and across Staffordshire.

== The Blitz ==
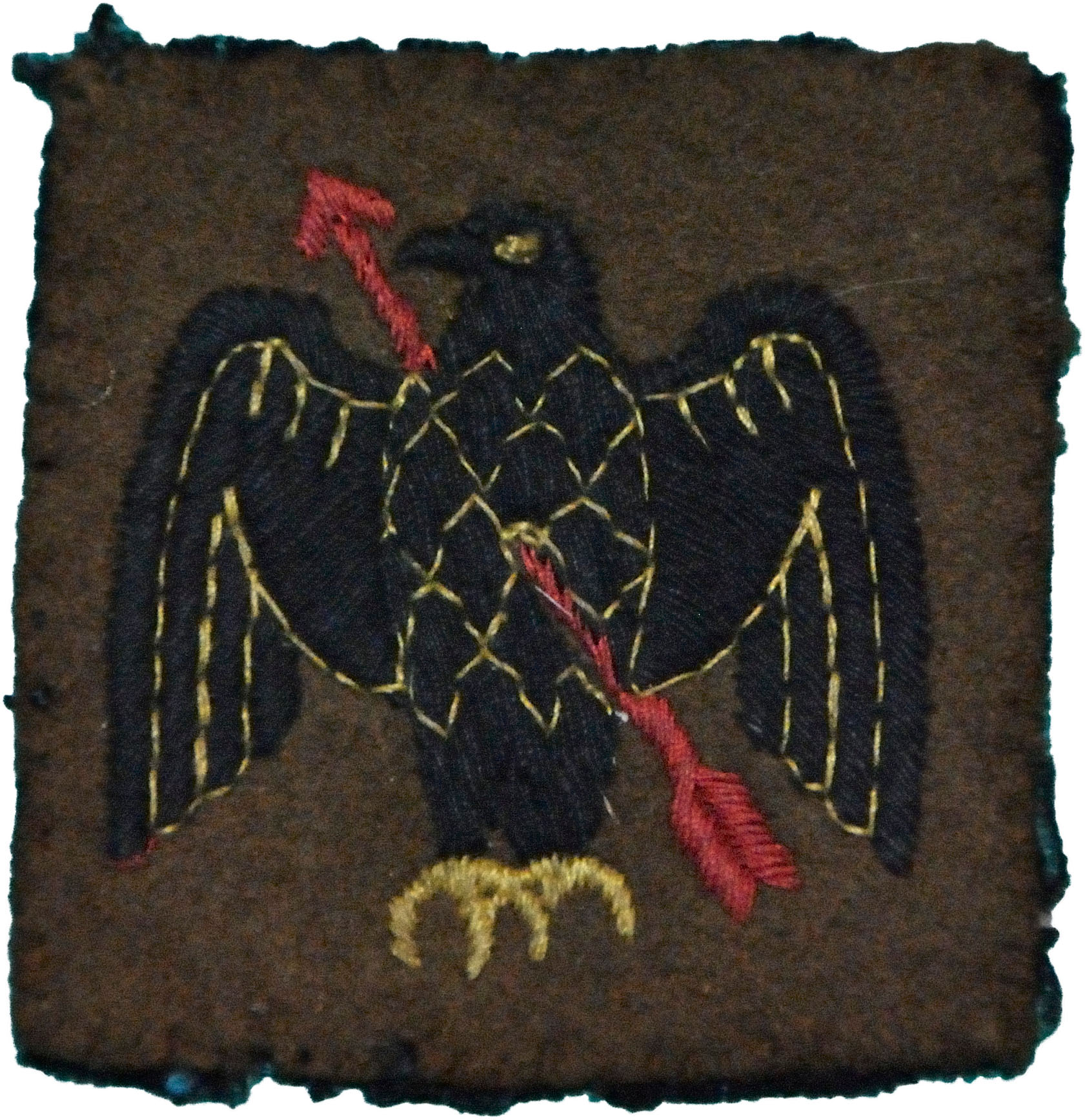
Formation sign of 11th AA Division.

By the time 83rd S/L Rgt joined, The Blitz was in full swing, with frequent night air raids on the industrial cities. The role of the S/L units was to track and illuminate raiders for the Heavy AA (HAA) guns of the Gun Defence Areas (GDAs) and for the few available Royal Air Force Night fighters. In November 1940 AA Command had adopted a system of clustering three S/Ls together to improve illumination, but this meant that the clusters had to be spaced 10,400 yards (9,500 m) apart. This layout was an attempt to improve the chances of picking up enemy bombers and keeping them illuminated for engagement by AA guns or night fighters. Eventually, one light in each cluster was to be equipped with Searchlight Control radar (SLC) and act as 'master light', but the radar equipment was still in short supply. In April and May 1941, Merseyside and the North Midlands were particularly badly bombed (the Liverpool Blitz).

Although operating within AA Command during the Blitz, 1st AA Bde HQ remained part of the War Office Reserve, available for service in the field. By the end of the Blitz in mid-May 1941 it had handed over its responsibilities and units, including 83rd SL Rgt, to a new 68th AA Bde and left AA Command. (Later in the year 1st AA Bde HQ went to the Middle East. Shortly after 83rd S/L Rgt joined 68th AA Bde it had 350 S/L Bty attached to it from 38th (The King's Regiment) S/L Rgt, which had returned from the Orkney and Shetland Defence Force (OSDEF). It rejoined its parent unit a few weeks later when that also arrived and joined 68th AA Bde later in June. During the summer 68th S/L Rgt itself transferred to 54th AA Bde in the West Midlands.

== Mid-War ==
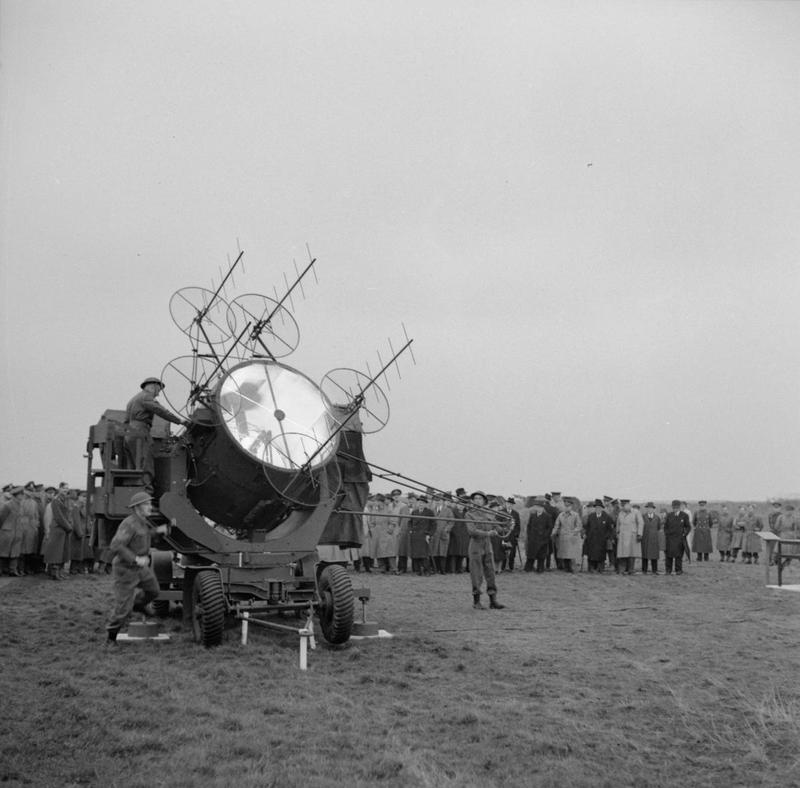
150 cm Searchlight fitted with No. 2 Mk VI SLC radar

By October 1941 the availability of SLC was sufficient to allow AA Command's S/L sites to be 'declustered' into single-light sites spaced at 10,400 yards (9,500 m) intervals in 'Indicator Belts' in the approaches to the GDAs, and 'Killer Belts' at 6,000 yards (5,500 m) spacing to cooperate with the RAF's night-fighters.

The regiment continued in 54th AA Bde during the winter of 1941–42 and into the next year. On 23 January 1942 365 S/L Bty transferred to the regiment from 41st (5th North Staffordshire Regiment) S/L Rgt in Leicestershire.

A reorganisation of AA Command in October 1942 saw the AA divisions disbanded and replaced by a smaller number of AA Groups more closely aligned with the groups of RAF Fighter Command. Thus 11th AA Division merged with 4th AA Division into 4 AA Group based at Preston and cooperating with No. 9 Group RAF.

Though other units came and went, 80th S/L Rgt remained with 54th AA Bde until September 1943, when it transferred to 27th (Home Counties) AA Bde in South East England under 2 AA Group. Between 21 January and 14 March 1944 the Luftwaffe carried out 11 night raids on London in the so-called 'Baby Blitz'. As they crossed South East England these raids were met by intense AA fire and RAF night fighters, which scored an impressive number of 'kills' in conjunction with radar-controlled S/Ls.

With the lower threat of attack by the weakened Luftwaffe, AA Command was now being forced to release manpower for the planned invasion of Normandy (Operation Overlord). All Home Defence S/L regiments were reduced from February 1944, and 83rd S/L Rgt lost 515 S/L Bty, which began to disband on 2 April, the process being completed by 30 April.

== Operation Diver ==
90 cm 'Projector Anti-Aircraft', displayed at Fort Nelson, Hampshire

AA Command had been given the responsibility for protecting the 'Overlord' embarkation ports, while at the same time intelligence indicated that the Germans could start launching V-1 flying bombs against London at any time. AA Command began reorganising the AA defences of the South Coast, including thickening up the S/L belts as part of Operation Diver against the V1s. 27th Anti-Aircraft Bde was responsible for 2 AA Group's S/L defences across Southern England.

The beginning of the V-1 campaign against London came on 13 June, a week after Overlord was launched on D Day, and Operation Diver was put into immediate effect. The S/L positions had been established at 3,000 yards (2,700 m) intervals to cooperate with RAF night fighters, and each position also had a Bofors 40 mm light AA gun. After a poor start the guns and fighters began to gain a measure of control over the flying bombs, and by the end of the first phase of the operation, when 21st Army Group overran the launch sites in Northern France in September, 1800 night fighter interceptions had been achieved, of which 142 were due to S/L illumination. In the autumn the focus switched to East Anglia when the Luftwaffe began air-launching V-1s over the North Sea. This led to another major reorganisation, and in October 83rd S/L Rgt transferred to 56th AA Bde commanding all the S/L units in 1 AA Group, which now controlled the 'Diver Box' covering the approaches to London from the east.

== Disbandment ==
By the end of 1944 AA Command was being forced to release manpower to 21st Army Group fighting in North West Europe and a number of AA regiments were disbanded or merged. On 10 December 1944 Regimental Headquarters of 83rd S/L Rgt with 365, 513 and 514 S/L Btys was ordered to disband, the process being completed by 11 May 1945 at Ipswich.

On 1 April 1947 the remaining wartime personnel of 51st (Devon) LAA Rgt were redesignated as 83 Light Anti-Aircraft/Searchlight Rgt when the rest of the regiment reformed in the Territorial Army. However the new 83rd was disbanded the following year.
