= Staffordshire Rangers =

Staffordshire Rangers 5th Battalion, North Staffordshire Regiment 41st Searchlight Regiment, Royal Artillery
- Active: 30 September 1859
- Country: United Kingdom
- Branch: Territorial Army
- Role: Infantry; Air Defence
- Garrison/HQ: Stoke-on-Trent
- Nickname: The Potters
- Engagements: WWI: Loos; Somme; Bucquoy; Lens; 3rd Ypres; Cambrai; German spring offensive WWII: Blitz; North West Europe

The Staffordshire Rangers was a volunteer unit of the British Army from the 'Potteries' area around Stoke-on-Trent. It fought on the Western Front in World War I as the 5th Battalion of the North Staffordshire Regiment. In World War II, it served as a Royal Artillery searchlight regiment in Home Defence and was the first complete searchlight unit to land in North-Western Europe after the D-Day landings of 6 June 1944. Its successors continue to serve in the Army Reserve (previously the Territorial Army) as part of the Mercian Regiment.

== Origins ==
As a result of an invasion scare in 1859, Rifle Volunteer Corps (RVCs) began to be organised throughout Great Britain. The 2nd Staffordshire RVC was raised in Longton, near Stoke-on-Trent, on 30 September 1859, and was quickly followed by others. By May 1860, there were enough company-sized RVCs in the Stoke area to be formed into the 1st Staffordshire Administrative Battalion. Brevet Major Coote Manningham Buller, a half-pay officer who had served with the Rifle Brigade during the Crimean War, was appointed lieutenant-colonel to command the battalion. On 1 June 1880, the administrative battalion was consolidated as the new 2nd Staffordshire RVC, with The Staffordshire Rangers permitted as an official title:

- HQ at Stoke-on-Trent
- A Company at Longton (original 2nd Staffs RVC formed 30 September 1859)
- B Company at Hanley (3rd Staffs RVC formed 27 September 1859)
- C Company at Burslem (6th Staffs RVC formed 28 December 1859)
- D Company at Tunstall (9th Staffs RVC formed 4 January 1860)
- E Company at Stoke-on-Trent (10th Staffs RVC formed 19 January 1860), with an affiliated Cadet Corps from 1875 to 1884.
- F Company at Kidsgrove (13th Staffs RVC formed 26 February 1860)
- G and H Companies at Newcastle-under-Lyme (16th Staffs RVC formed at the Old Barracks at Newcastle-under-Lyme on 24 February 1860)
- J Company at Leek (28th Staffs RVC formed 26 April 1860)
- K Company at Hanley (36th Staffs RVC formed 18 June 1860)
- L Company at Stone (40th Staffs RVC formed 1 December 1860)
- M Company was formed later at Trentham

== Localisation and mobilisation ==
Under the scheme of 'localisation' introduced by the Cardwell Reforms, Regular infantry battalions became linked in pairs assigned to particular counties or localities, and the county Militia and Volunteers were affiliated to them. The populous county of Staffordshire was divided into two under this scheme, and from 1873 the 1st Admin Bn was attached to 'Sub-District No 19', headquartered in Lichfield and associated with the 38th (1st Staffordshire) Regiment of Foot and 80th (Staffordshire Volunteers) Regiment of Foot.

The 1881 Childers Reforms took Cardwell's scheme a stage further, with the linked battalions converting into single two-battalion regiments. However, while the 38th and 80th became the South Staffordshire Regiment (the 'South Staffs'), the Staffordshire Rangers were instead affiliated to the Prince of Wales's (North Staffordshire) Regiment (the 'North Staffs'), formed from the 64th (2nd Staffordshire) Regiment of Foot and 98th (Prince of Wales's) Regiment of Foot. It was formally designated as the 1st Volunteer Battalion of the North Staffordshire Regiment in 1883. Previously, its uniform had been red with blue facings, but in 1886 it adopted the white facings of the North Staffs.

Under Childers, the Volunteers were assigned a place in the scheme of national defence, and the Staffordshire RVCs were expected to join the Portsmouth garrison in case of war. The Stanhope Memorandum of December 1888 proposed a more comprehensive Mobilisation Scheme for Volunteer units, which would assemble in their own brigades at key points in case of war. In peacetime, these brigades provided a structure for collective training. Under this scheme, the Volunteer Battalions of the 'North Staffs' and 'South Staffs' formed the Staffordshire Volunteer Infantry Brigade, whose place of assembly in case of war was at Wolverhampton.

== Territorial Force ==
On the formation of the Territorial Force in 1908, the 1st Volunteer Battalion became the 5th Battalion of the North Staffs, and the Staffordshire Brigade was assigned to the North Midland Division. There were minor changes to the battalion's organisation:

- A Company at Portland Road, Longton
- B Company (former B & K) at the Drill Hall, Shelton (one of the battalion's main recruiting areas)
- C Company at Newcastle Street, Burslem
- D Company at The Armoury, Bath Street, Tunstall
- E Company at the Drill Hall, Hill Street, Stoke
- F Company (former L) at The Armoury, Town Hall, High Street, Stone
- G Company (former G & H) at The Barracks, Barracks Street, Newcastle-under-Lyme
- H Company (former M) at Trent Vale, Trentham

At the same time, the men of J Company at Leek mainly transferred to a newly formed 2nd North Midland Brigade, Royal Field Artillery.

== World War I ==
=== Mobilisation ===
On the outbreak of war in August 1914, the battalion mobilised at Hanley and soon afterwards was invited to volunteer for foreign service. This was accepted by the majority of the men, and the North Midland Division moved to Luton and later to Bishop's Stortford to train for deployment overseas. On 1 November, a 2nd-Line TF battalion designated the 2/5th was formed at Hanley from the Home Service men and new recruits, the original battalion becoming the 1/5th. The North Midland Division began landing in France in late February 1915 and by 8 March had completed its concentration – the first complete TF formation to arrive on the Western Front. It was numbered the 46th (North Midland) Division in May, when the Staffordshire Brigade was numbered 137th (Staffordshire) Brigade.

=== 1/5th Battalion ===
==== Hohenzollern Redoubt ====
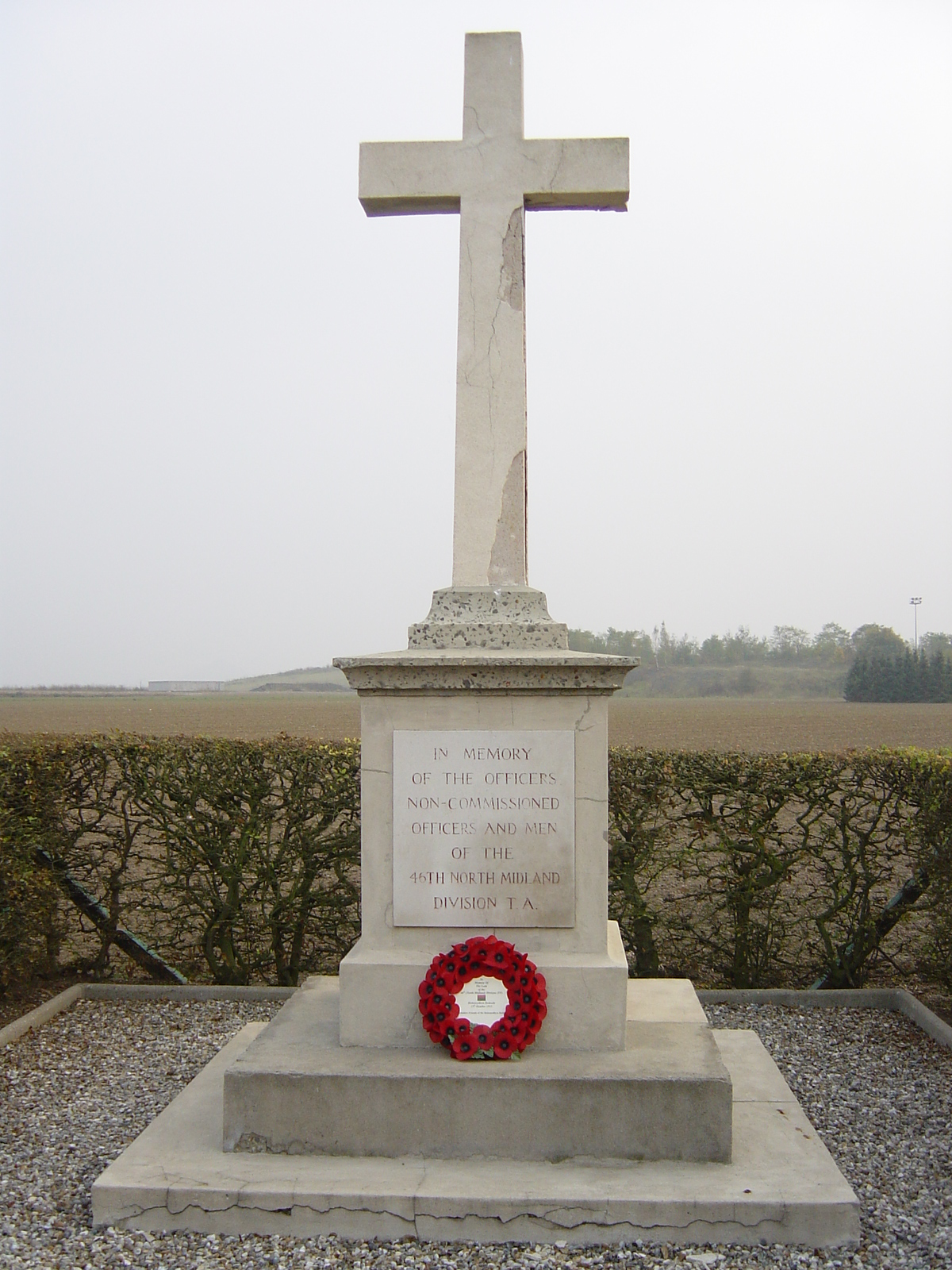
46th Division memorial at Vermelles, starting point for the division's attack on 13 October 1915

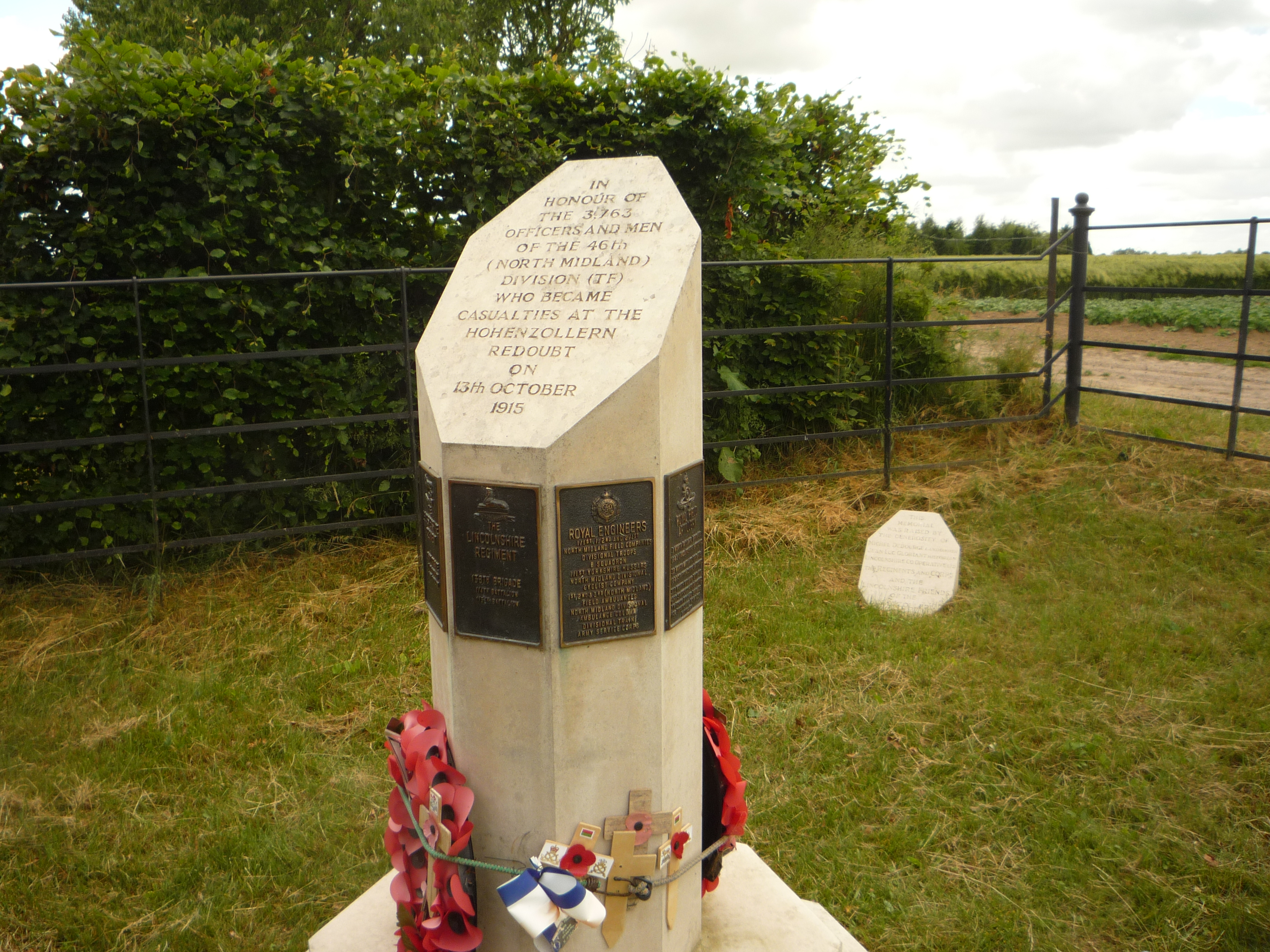
46th (North Midland) Division's memorial at Cité de Madagascar, site of the Hohenzollern Redoubt.

The battalion was not involved in the 46th Division's first action (the German flamethrower attack at Hooge in the Ypres Salient on 30–31 July 1915), but was in the forefront of the attack on the Hohenzollern Redoubt in October that year. This was an attempt to restart the failed Battle of Loos, and the division was moved down from Ypres on 1 October for the purpose. The Germans recaptured the Hohenzollern trench system on 3 October, and the new attack was aimed at this point, the actual objective for 1/5th being 'Big Willie' trench followed by 'The Dump' behind the Hohenzollern trenches. It went in at 14.00 on 13 October behind a gas cloud, two companies of 1/5th North Staffs led, the other two being in the second line, followed by bombing parties to clear enemy dugouts. The men of 1/5th Bn are recorded as shouting 'Forward the Potters' and 'Up the Potters' when they attacked. Things did not go according to plan: the British bombardment had been ineffective while the German artillery brought down a barrage on the division's jumping-off trenches. Charging towards 'Big Willie' trench on the flank of the Hohenzollern, the 1/5th North Staffs came under enfilade fire and lost 20 officers and 485 other ranks in the first few minutes of the attack, the highest casualty rate of any battalion in the 46th Division. The killed included the commanding officer, Lt-Col John Knight, who had been a Volunteer since 1883. Only a handful of the battalion got as far as Big Willie, and there they held on desperately against prompt German counter-attacks. The British attack was quickly called off.

In December 1915, the division was ordered to Egypt, and 137th Brigade arrived there by 13 January. A week later, the move was countermanded and the troops re-embarked for France, concentrating near Amiens by mid-February. The only result of this move was an outbreak of infectious disease (Paratyphoid fever and Diphtheria) that weakened units and men for months to come.

==== Gommecourt ====
The 46th Division went back into the line in the Vimy sector, suffering a steady trickle of casualties over the coming months. In May, however, it moved south to take part in the forthcoming offensive on the Somme. The division was ordered to assault the north side of the Gommecourt Salient on 1 July 1916. The operation, in conjunction with the 56th (1/1st London) Division attacking from the south, aimed at cutting off the salient, but was in fact a diversion for the main attack a few miles south that opened the Battle of the Somme. During the preparations for this attack, the 1/5th North Staffs dug practice trenches behind the line for the division to rehearse.

This time, 1/5th North Staffs and 1/5th South Staffs were supporting the attack of 137th Brigade, with bombing parties accompanying the 2nd, 3rd and 4th waves, while the rest of the battalions in the 5th–8th waves were to set off from the Support Line and further back, carrying heavy loads of trench equipment for consolidating the anticipated captures. But the attack was another disaster, the first wave being cut down almost on the start line. The jumping-off and communication trenches were completely inadequate, and the following waves were badly delayed, completely mixed up, and suffering casualties from German shellfire. The brigadier tried to organise a second attack by 1/5th North Staffs and 1/5th South Staffs, but the 1/5th North Staffs now had only 200 men present, and their commanding officer was wounded. After several delays they were told to 'sit tight' and abandon an attack that the Official History says 'would have been a mere waste of life'. Even though they had not been in the leading waves, the 1/5th North Staffs lost 219 officers and men out of a strength of about 600. The battalion's commander, Lt-Col W. Burnett, died of his wounds later, and Major A.E.F. Fawcus of the Manchester Regiment was appointed CO in his place.

==== Bucquoy ====
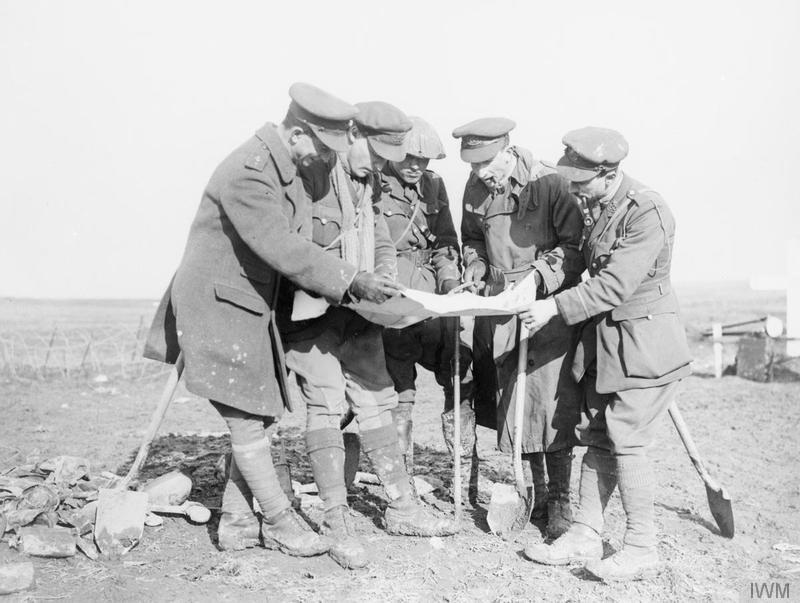
Officers of the 5th Battalion, North Staffordshire Regiment, Bucquoy, March 1917. The battalion took part in the unsuccessful attack of 14 March on Bucquoy, which was evacuated by the Germans on 18 March.

Early 1917 saw the 46th Division still holding the line in the same area. However, at the beginning of March, patrols found that the Germans were beginning to retreat from the Gommecourt defences. The division followed up slowly and cautiously, but on the night of 14 March an attack on Bucquoy Graben (trench) by the 1/5th North Staffs and 1/6th South Staffs led to heavy casualties. The rushed attack had been ordered by V Corps headquarters despite the protests of the divisional commander. The battalions had been on the training grounds practising for the attack when it was brought forward. Although 'the assault was gallantly pressed' (Official History), it was a complete failure. Among the dead from 1/5th North Staffs was Capt Arthur Felix Wedgwood of the famous pottery family.

The Germans eventually retreated as far as their new Hindenburg Line defences well beyond the Somme battlefields, but 46th Division was withdrawn from the pursuit on 17 March. It spent some time clearing the battlefield of 1 July 1916 and burying the dead who had been lying in No Man's Land for almost 10 months. The men buried in these small battlefield cemeteries were later re-interred in Gommecourt Wood New Cemetery.

==== Lens ====
After rest and training, 46th Division returned to the line in the mining sector around Lens in April. Late in May, the division began small-scale operations against Hill 65. On 8 June, 138th Brigade attacked, with 137th Brigade providing a diversion using dummies representing an advancing battalion. On 14 June, two companies of 1/5th North Staffs raided 'Narwal' and 'Contact' trenches, occupying the position for 40 minutes before withdrawing with prisoners, having caused considerable casualties.

46th Division was now ordered to capture Lens itself, beginning on 28 June. 1/5th North Staffs was in Brigade Reserve for the attack, which gained its objectives with few casualties. Another divisional attack on 1 July aimed at capturing more houses and trenches. 1/5th North Staffs led 137th Brigade's attack on 'Aconite' trench, in two waves behind a creeping barrage beginning at 02.47. By 07.00 the two right companies held Aconite, but the two left companies were held up in severe house-to-house fighting. A second push at 08.00 cleared the cellars round the church and caused heavy casualties to the defenders. But in the afternoon a German counter-attack drove the battalion back to its start line.

After Lens, the division was withdrawn into reserve, and did not engage in major operations again during 1917. On 29–30 January 1918, the 1/5th North Staffs was broken up to provide replacements to other North Staffs battalions, some going to the 1/6th Battalion in 137th Brigade, some to the 2/5th (see below) and 2/6th battalions serving in the 59th Division, and some to the 'New Army' 9th (Service) Battalion, which was serving as Pioneers in 37th Division.

=== 2/5th Battalion ===
The 2nd-Line battalion was formed on 1 November 1914 at Hanley from men who had not volunteered for overseas service, together with the many new recruits under training. Initially, it was intended to provide drafts for the 1/5th Battalion in France, but this role was later taken over by the 3/5th Battalion. Mirroring its 1st-Line parent, the battalion formed part of 2nd Staffordshire Brigade in 2nd North Midland Division; these were later numbered 176th (2/1st Staffordshire) Brigade and 59th (2nd North Midland) Division respectively. Training was carried out at Luton and later St Albans.

In April 1916, the battalion was sent to Dublin to help quell disturbances following the Easter Rising – the troops of the 59th Division were the first TF units to serve in Ireland. After the suppression of the trouble, the division moved to Curragh Camp and resumed training. It returned to England in January 1917 and began final battle training at Fovant, where there was a large purpose-built camp on the edge of the Salisbury Plain training area, before embarking for France on 17 February.

==== 3rd Ypres ====
The 59th Division took part in following the German Retreat to Hindenburg Line in March and April, but it was not until September that it was engaged in its first full-scale action, the phase of the 3rd Ypres Offensive known as the Battle of the Menin Road Ridge. This was a carefully prepared assault with massive artillery preparation, and most of the objectives were taken easily. The next phase, the Battle of Polygon Wood (26 September), was equally successful, with 176th Brigade advancing steadily behind its barrage onto the final objectives.

==== Bourlon Wood ====
59th Division was next moved south to join in the Battle of Cambrai. The division entered the recently captured line between Cantaing and Bourlon Wood on 28 November. Fierce German counter-attacks began on 30 November. Two infantry assaults were made against 176th Brigade, the second striking 2/5th North Staffs near Fontaine between 11.00 and 12.00. Both attacks were easily broken up under British artillery fire. Lance-Corporal John Thomas of the 2/5th saw this counter-attack being prepared, and on his own initiative he and a comrade went out to reconnoitre the buildings at the western end of Fontaine. His comrade was hit almost immediately, but Thomas stayed out for three hours, shot several German snipers, and gathered valuable information. He was awarded the Victoria Cross for his gallantry. That night, the rest of 176th Brigade in Bourlon Wood were subjected to a violent bombardment of high explosive and gas shells, but the division was not directly attacked the following morning. By 4 December the decision had been made to withdraw from the Bourlon Salient, and 59th Division held covering positions while this was carried out. By 7 December, the British were back on the line that they would hold for the coming winter.

At the end of January 1918, the battalion absorbed a draft of men from the 1/5th Battalion, which was being broken up (see above). Henceforth, the 2/5th became simply the 5th Battalion.

==== German Offensive ====
When the German spring offensive opened on 21 March 1918 (the Battle of St Quentin), 59th Division was holding the line of the Bullecourt Salient, with the 5th North Staffs in the thinly held 'Forward Zone', covering Bullecourt itself. This was where the heaviest German attack fell, following a hurricane bombardment and covered by morning mist. The battalion repulsed the first attack on its front, but shortly afterwards was driven from its defences and forced back through the village. At 12.15, supported by heavy artillery firing from the rear, it was still clinging to the southern edge of Bullecourt, but its reserve line was being rolled up from the flank, and soon the remnants of the battalion were forced back to a communication trench west of Bullecourt. Both here and in the defences further to the north west a few survivors fought on for some hours. A small party, which eventually succeeded in withdrawing, reported that it had fallen back from post to post, beating off many attacks, and that an officer was last seen at 16.00 still firing a Lewis gun, though with one hand smashed. Almost the whole battalion had been killed or captured, including the CO, Lt-Col H. Johnson (wounded and captured). Only one front-line officer of 176th Brigade made it back, and the survivors were collected that night two miles back, to hold a trench there.

What remained of 59th Division fought rearguard actions during the British Army's 'Great Retreat'. It was sent north to recuperate, but there the survivors were caught up in the second phase of the German spring offensive, the Battles of Bailleul (14–15 April) and Kemmel Ridge (17–18 April) forming part of the larger Battles of the Lys.

In May 1918, the shattered 59th Division was temporarily disbanded and its battalions reduced to training cadres, the surplus men being drafted to other units. On 9 May, the 5th North Staffs joined 49th Brigade of 16th (Irish) Division. When that division returned to the United Kingdom to be rebuilt, the 5th Bn was transferred first to 103rd (Tyneside Irish) Brigade in 34th Division on 17 June, then to 117th Brigade of 39th Division on 27 June and finally to 116th Brigade in 39th Division. All these formations were training cadres, the 39th Division being engaged in training US Army troops. On 6 November 1918, the battalion was demobilised and the remaining men drafted to other units.

=== 3/5th Battalion ===
A reserve battalion, designated the 3/5th, was formed in May 1915 at Catterick, moving to Grantham in October 1915. In April 1916, it was redesignated the 5th Reserve Battalion, North Staffs, and in September absorbed the 6th Reserve Battalion (formerly the 3/6th Bn from Burton-upon-Trent) and joined the North Midland Reserve Brigade. It moved to Lincoln in March 1917 and to the coast at Mablethorpe in July. It remained in the United Kingdom as a training unit in the North Midland Reserve Brigade of the TF until the end of the war.

== Interwar years ==
On 7 February 1920, the 5th North Staffs was reformed in the TF (reconstituted as the Territorial Army in 1921). Once again, it was in 137 (Staffordshire) Bde in 46th (North Midland) Division.

In December 1936, the 46th (North Midland) Division was disbanded and its headquarters was reconstituted as 2nd Anti-Aircraft Division to control the increasing number of anti-aircraft (AA) units being created in the Midlands and North of England. At the same time, several of its infantry battalions were converted into searchlight battalions of the Royal Engineers (RE). The 5th North Staffs was one of these, becoming 41st (5th North Staffordshire Regiment) Anti-Aircraft Battalion, RE (TA) with HQ and 362–364 AA Companies at Winton Terrace, Stoke, and 365 AA Company at the Drill Hall, Newcastle-under-Lyme. It formed part of 33rd (Western) Anti-Aircraft Group in 2 AA Division.

== World War II ==
=== Mobilisation ===
As tensions rose at the time of the Munich Crisis, the TA's AA units were mobilised on 23 September 1938, with units manning their emergency positions within 24 hours, even though many did not yet have their full complement of men or equipment. The emergency lasted three weeks, and they were stood down on 13 October. Afterwards, Britain's AA defences were further strengthened. 4th AA Division was formed in 1938 and 33 AA Brigade was transferred to it, while all TA AA formations were brought under a newly created Anti-Aircraft Command in February 1939. In June, a partial mobilisation of TA units was begun in a process known as 'couverture', whereby each AA unit did a month's tour of duty in rotation to man selected AA and searchlight positions. On 24 August, ahead of the declaration of war, AA Command was fully mobilised at its war stations.

On the outbreak of war, a new 54th AA Brigade was forming in 4 AA Division, and 41 AA Battalion was to join it, but the orders to mobilise on 22 August 1939 were actually issued to the battalion by 34th (South Midland) AA Brigade.

=== The Phoney War ===
90 cm Projector Anti-Aircraft, displayed at Fort Nelson, Portsmouth

41st AA Battalion spent the autumn of 1939 drawing searchlight equipment from stores, moving to its war stations, and digging in its AA Light machine gun (LMG) positions. Battalion HQ moved from Stoke to Hewell Grange, near Redditch. By November, 362 and 363 Companies were operating in the Birmingham Gun Zone (GZ), 364 in the Derby and Nottingham GZ, while 365 Company was guarding vital points around Ironbridge, but then orders came for the whole battalion to move to the Derby and Nottingham GZ to provide illumination for 68th (North Midland) AA Regiment, Royal Artillery. At the same time, Battalion HQ moved to Spondon Hall, Derby.

=== The Blitz ===
On 1 August 1940, the AA battalions of the RE were transferred to the Royal Artillery (RA), with the unit becoming 41st (5th North Staffordshire Regiment) Searchlight Regiment, RA (often abbreviated as '41 (5 NSR) S/L Rgt') and the companies were designated as batteries. By now, the unit had reverted to 2 AA Division, forming part of 32nd (Midland) Anti-Aircraft Brigade responsible for defending the East Midlands of England. In May, Battalion HQ had moved to Wilford House, near Nottingham; now it moved again to Oakham with 365 Bty, while 363 Bty moved to the Sheffield GZ.

In early 1941, 41 S/L Rgt sent a cadre of experienced men to 235 S/L Training Rgt at Troon where they formed 541st S/L Bty with recruits mainly from Glasgow. This battery then formed part of 89th S/L Rgt, which was later converted into 133rdLight AA Rgt, and fought in the North West Europe campaign.

The quiet period of the Phoney War was followed by an intense period of enemy air activity that culminated in the Blitz of 1940–41. The Heavy Anti-Aircraft (HAA) guns of the Derby AA Barrage fired for the first time on 19 August. In November, one of 363 Bty's LMG teams shot down a Dornier Do 17 bomber at Borton-in-the-Wolds, while in February 1941, 365's Bty HQ was strafed by a Heinkel He 111. In 1941, the searchlight layout over the Midlands was reorganised, so that any hostile raid approaching the Gun Defended Areas (GDA) around the towns must cross more than one searchlight belt, and then within the GDAs the concentration of lights was increased.

May 1941 saw RHQ moving to Melton Mowbray, returning to Oakham in January 1942. In that month, 365 Bty was transferred to 83 S/L Regiment, RA Searchlight Control (SLC) Radar, known as 'Elsie', was introduced from 1941 and was in widespread use by 1942. In July 1942, the Luftwaffe transferred its attention from 'Baedeker Blitz' targets to industrial cities in Northern England. On the nights of 27/28 and 29/30 July, there were heavy raids and 41 Rgt's searchlights were engaged in illuminating targets for the AA guns. Sergeant L. Cox shot down a Junkers Ju 88 with his site's LMG.

=== Home Defence ===
In October 1942, AA Command reorganised its structure, replacing the AA Divisions with AA Groups coinciding with RAF Fighter Command's Groups. 41 Searchlight Regiment came under 5 AA Group, which reorganised its defences in January 1943. 41 S/L Regiment was ordered to take over searchlight sites defending the Humber Estuary, 362 Bty going to Pollington, 364 Bty going to Scunthorpe, while 363 Bty and Regimental HQ moved to the Militia Camp at Thorne, near Doncaster. On the night of 9 March 1943, a Dornier 217 picked up by the searchlights engaged two of the regiment's sites at Yokefleet with bombs, incendiaries and flares. In August 1943, 362 Bty moved from Pollington to North Cave. By now, Luftwaffe bombing raids were rare, and the regiment concentrated on 'Bullseye' exercises to practise cooperation with Night fighter aircraft.

By 1944, 41 S/L Rgt had come under the orders of 31st (North Midland) Anti-Aircraft Brigade, which was earmarked for Operation Overlord, the invasion of German-occupied France. The regiments re-equipped their AA LMG sections with twin Browning machine guns. In February, RHQ and 363 Bty moved from Thorne to The Croft at Selby and Skipwith Hall respectively. Meanwhile, 'Bullseye' exercises continued with No. 264 Squadron RAF.

=== Normandy ===
On 15 April 1944, the regiment received orders to mobilise for overseas service, which was completed by 19 May. On 7 June (the day after D-Day), it was ordered to move to a concentration area in Sussex, where it practised laying out mobile searchlight sites and waterproofed its equipment ready for landing in Normandy. It embarked at Southampton Docks on 8 August and by 11 August was deployed to defend the vital US Army supply port of Cherbourg.

41 (5 NSR) was the first full searchlight regiment to land in Normandy during Overlord, joining some independent batteries that had landed earlier, and until the autumn was the only such unit operating in 21st Army Group. Air defence of the crowded bridgehead was vital, and by day the Allies had almost total air superiority, but night raids were common. Communications between sites and operation rooms proved to be a headache, even though the regiment had been loaned the Royal Corps of Signals (RCS) line section of 42 S/L Regt (which was waiting to deploy to Normandy) and had the assistance of 153 and 154 Line Sections RCS.

=== Low Countries ===
In September, the sudden Allied breakout from the Normandy bridgehead left the regiment behind, and it moved up behind the troops, coming under the command of 51 AA Defence HQ, and deploying in troop 'clumps' along the Rivers Seine and Somme, although there was no German air activity. On 22 October, the regiment was transferred to the command of 101 AA Brigade and moved to the Brussels area to be employed in the 'Anti-Diver' role against V-1 flying bombs heading towards Antwerp. 362 Battery had three men killed by one of these V-1 attacks.

Meanwhile, some 41 S/L Regiment personnel were attached 31 AA Brigade HQ for trials using 'Elsie' to track enemy mortar fire. On 18 November, a premature explosion while firing a captured German 81 mm mortar killed five men (including three from 41 S/L) and wounded four men of 41 S/L. Lieutenant Gilbert Rabbetts of 41 S/L 'acted with great gallantry, rapidly removing wounded to hospital, though himself badly wounded' and was later awarded the MBE.

In late November, the regiment moved north of Antwerp under 105th Anti-Aircraft Brigade, leaving two Troops of 362 Bty deployed round Dunkirk to illuminate aircraft and shipping trying to supply the Germans besieged in the town. The regiment took up positions along the long vulnerable line of the River Scheldt for the winter, adopting an 'extended canopy' layout, introducing new Mk VIII centimetric radar SLC and cooperating with Light Anti-Aircraft (LAA) batteries. There were frequent German raids in late December (during the Battle of the Bulge), and on 1 January 1945 a low-level daylight raid by about 40 Messerschmitt Bf 109 and Focke-Wulf Fw 190 single-engined fighter-bombers across the Scheldt was engaged by 20 of 41 S/L's sites with Bren gun and small arms fire: the regiment was credited with two 'kills'. Another heavy mid-level raid on 23 January resulted in more 'kills' shared with the LAA batteries.

By February 1945, the regiment was reporting no hostile activity, but it was frequently called upon to illuminate and identify friendly aircraft infringing the defence zone. It was also fitting out a Landing Craft Tank ('Barge AA No 1') with searchlights for duty on the Scheldt, and deploying new 20 mm Polsten cannon to the S/L detachments. Otherwise, training was started for the regiment to take over garrison duty in Germany at the war's end.

=== Germany ===
In April, the regiment moved up first to the River Waal at Nijmegen and then to the Rhine, which had been crossed by 21st Army Group. Part of the duty was to provide illumination for engineers building bridges and also to prevent boat attacks on the bridges. On the night of 7/8 April, D Troop of 362 Bty provided 'artificial moonlight' for a raid by the 1st Czechoslovak Armoured Brigade against Dunkirk, and on 25 April the Troop shelled the Germans with its new Polsten guns.

Immediately after VE Day (8 May 1945), the regiment handed in its S/L equipment and began occupation duties in Germany – apart from a detachment sent to provide illumination for a British Army Exhibition in Paris. The regiment took over responsibility for the districts of Hildesheim, Marienberg and Peine in Lower Saxony, dealing with thousands of displaced persons ('DP's) and released prisoners of war. As demobilisation began, the regiment was kept up to strength for these duties into 1946 by absorbing cadres from other disbanded S/L and LAA regiments. The regiment was placed in suspended animation on 1 March 1946.

=== Commanding Officers ===
The following officers commanded 41 (5NSR) S/L Rgt during World War II:

- Lt-Col J.O. Doyle, OBE, TD, appointed 2 May 1936
- Lt-Col Marcus Jelley, OBE, from 9 June 1940 to VE Day

== Postwar ==
On 1 January 1947, the regiment was reformed in the Territorial Army as 576 (5th Bn, The North Staffordshire Regiment) Searchlight Regiment RA (TA). It formed part of 74 AA Brigade at Stoke. In 1949, it was redesignated as a (Mixed) Light Anti-Aircraft/Searchlight Regiment (the 'mixed' referring to the fact that members of the Women's Royal Army Corps were integrated into the regiment). On 10 March 1955, AA Command was disbanded and the number of air defence units reduced: 576 LAA/SL Regiment was amalgamated with 349 (Lancashire Yeomanry) LAA and 493 HAA Regiments as 441 LAA/SL Regiment in 2nd Army Group Royal Artillery (AA).

- P (5th North Staffords) Battery
- Q (Wirral) Battery – from 493 HAA
- R (5th North Staffords) Battery

The regiment later dropped the searchlight part of its designation. On 1 May 1961, P and R Batteries reverted to the infantry role and were amalgamated with 6th Bn North Staffs to form 5th/6th Bn, while a Troop of Q Battery joined 7th Bn Cheshire Regiment.

In 1967, the 5/6th North Staffs and 7th Cheshire were both merged into the Mercian Volunteers, the 5/6th Bn becoming C (Staffordshire) Company. When the Mercian Volunteers were disbanded in 1988, C Company was transferred to 3rd (Volunteer) Battalion Staffordshire Regiment(The Prince of Wales's). This battalion in turn was disbanded in 1999, with C Company becoming C (Stafford) Company of the West Midlands Regiment. In 2007, the West Midlands Regiment was merged into Mercian Regiment, with the Staffordshire lineage being continued by 3rd Battalion.

== Honorary Colonel ==
The following officers served as Honorary Colonel of the regiment:

- Lt-Col Coote Manningham Buller, first commanding officer of the 1st Administrative Bn Staffs RVC, appointed 7 April 1865, until 1873.
- Lt-Col Joseph Knight, VD, former second-in-command of the 1st VB North Staffs, appointed 1888, until 1900.
- Col Sir William Warrington Dobson, VD, TD, of Seighford Hall, chairman of Parkers Burslem Brewery, joined the 1st VB North Staffs in 1880 and rose to be its commanding officer 1900–08. He chaired the organising committee for the Staffordshire Territorial Association, and was appointed Hon Col of the new 5th North Staffs on 26 May 1908, remaining Hon Col of the 41st S/L Rgt until his death in 1941.

== Prominent Members ==
- Clement Francis Wedgwood of the Wedgwood pottery firm was the original lieutenant of the 36th Staffs RVC at Hanley.
- His son, Arthur Felix Wedgwood, was a captain in the 5th North Staffs, killed in action at Bucquoy on 14 March 1917.
- Arthur's nephew and Clement's grandson, Sir John Wedgwood, 2nd Baronet, was commissioned into the 41st (5th North Staffs) AA Bn in 1938 and served on the staff during World War II. (There were two other Wedgwoods among the officers of 41 S/L Rgt on the eve of World War II.)
- Basil Thomas Fitzherbert, of Norbury and Swynnerton in Staffordshire (1836–1919) was commissioned as lieutenant of the 38th Staffs RVC on 17 September 1860, but became captain of the 40th Staffs RVC on 1 December the same year. He was the father of Francis Fitzherbert-Stafford, 12th Baron Stafford.
- L/Cpl John Thomas, VC winner.

== Memorials ==
- There is a World War I memorial to 32 members of F (former L) Company 1/5th North Staffs at Granville Square in Stone
- A World War I memorial plaque was erected at Newcastle-under-Lyme School to former pupils who served in the 5th North Staffs.
- A memorial to the 59th (North Midland) Division and its units was erected in St Mary's Church, Stafford, after World War I.
- A grove of trees at the National Memorial Arboretum, Staffordshire, is dedicated to all the Staffordshire Regiments.
- The battalion's first CO, Lt-Col Coote Manningham Buller (and several of his military relatives) is commemorated on a plaque at All Saints Church, Dilhorne, Staffordshire.

== Online sources ==
- British Army units from 1945 on
- British Military History
- Buxton War Memorials
- Commonwealth War Graves Commission
- Imperial War Museum War Memorials Archive
- Orders of Battle at Patriot Files
- Land Forces of Britain, the Empire and Commonwealth – Regiments.org (archive site)
- Royal Artillery 1939–1945
- Graham Watson, The Territorial Army 1947
