= Arthur Edward Flynn Fawcus =

British Military Cross recipient (1886–1936)

Lieutenant-Colonel Arthur Edward Flynn Fawcus DSO MC TD
- Born: 19 October 1886; Keswick, Cumbria, England
- Died: 10 August 1936 (aged 49); Pagham, West Sussex, England
- Military career
- Allegiance: United Kingdom
- Branch: British Army
- Rank: Lieutenant-Colonel
- Commands: 1/5th North Staffordshire Regiment; 1/5th Sherwood Foresters
- Conflicts: World War I Gallipoli Campaign
- Awards: Chevalier, Légion d'honneur Distinguished Service Order; Military Cross; Territorial Decoration; Mentioned in Despatches (4)

Lieutenant-Colonel Arthur Edward Flynn Fawcus DSO MC TD (19 October 1886 – 10 August 1936), was awarded the Military Cross for leading a night attack at Cape Helles in August 1915 at the beginning of the Gallipoli Campaign, awarded the Croix de Chevalier of the Légion d'honneur for his bombing work in the Gallipoli Campaign, awarded the DSO for his Command of a Battalion of the 1/5th North Staffordshire Regiment toward the end of World War I and was afterwards Commander of the 1/5th Sherwood Foresters.

== Life ==
Fawcus was born on 19 October 1886 in Keswick, the second son of W.P.J. Fawcus. He was educated at Bedford Modern School.

Fawcus was on active service with the Marakwet Patrol in British East Africa in 1911 and mentioned in despatches. At the outbreak of World War I he was on active service the next day with the King's African Rifles in German East Africa where he served until February 1915 before being sent to Egypt with the 7th Manchester Regiment.

In May 1915, Fawcus was in Gallipoli with the 7th Manchesters and the 1/6th Lancashire Fusiliers where he was awarded the Military Cross for leading a night attack at Cape Helles in August 1915. He was made a Chevalier of the Legion of Honour for his bombing work during the Gallipoli Campaign.

From January to July 1916, Fawcus was in Egypt with the 7th, 8th and 9th Manchesters and then served in France until 1918. As Commander of a battalion of the 1/5th North Staffordshire Regiment he was awarded the Distinguished Service Order in June 1918 and he later commanded the 1/5th Sherwood Foresters for eighteen months. During World War I he was mentioned in despatches three times.

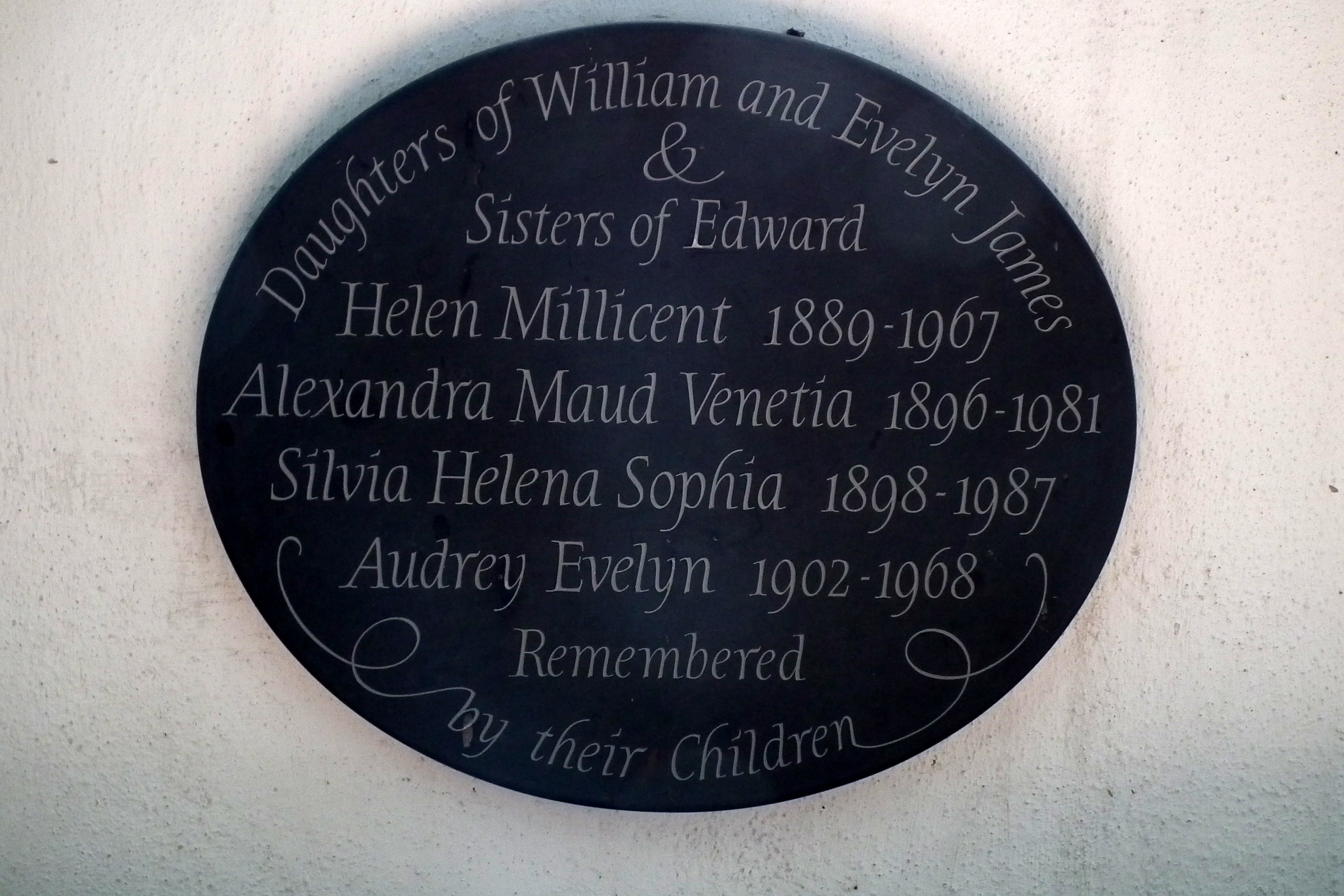
Mr & Mrs William James's children. Plaque in St Andrew's West Dean, West Sussex UK

Fawcus was killed in an aeroplane crash at Pagham in England on 10 August 1936. The pilot, Michael Richard Montagu, was apparently attempting a third loop the loop over the sea when the engine choked and the plane plunged into shallow water killing Fawcus and Montagu. Montagu was a stepson of Lord Kimberley.

Fawcus married Alexandra James in 1918, the daughter of Mr & Mrs William James of West Dean House, Chichester, Sussex who were friends of King Edward and Queen Alexandra. There is a photograph of his wife at the National Portrait Gallery. He was survived by his wife, two sons and a daughter. He was well known in East Africa where he'd lived in Kenya and Tanganyika. One of his sons, James Fawcus, was killed in March 1945 whilst serving with the King's Royal Rifle Corps.
