= College Road drill hall =

Military building in Stoke-on-Trent, England

- Hanley, Stoke-on-Trent
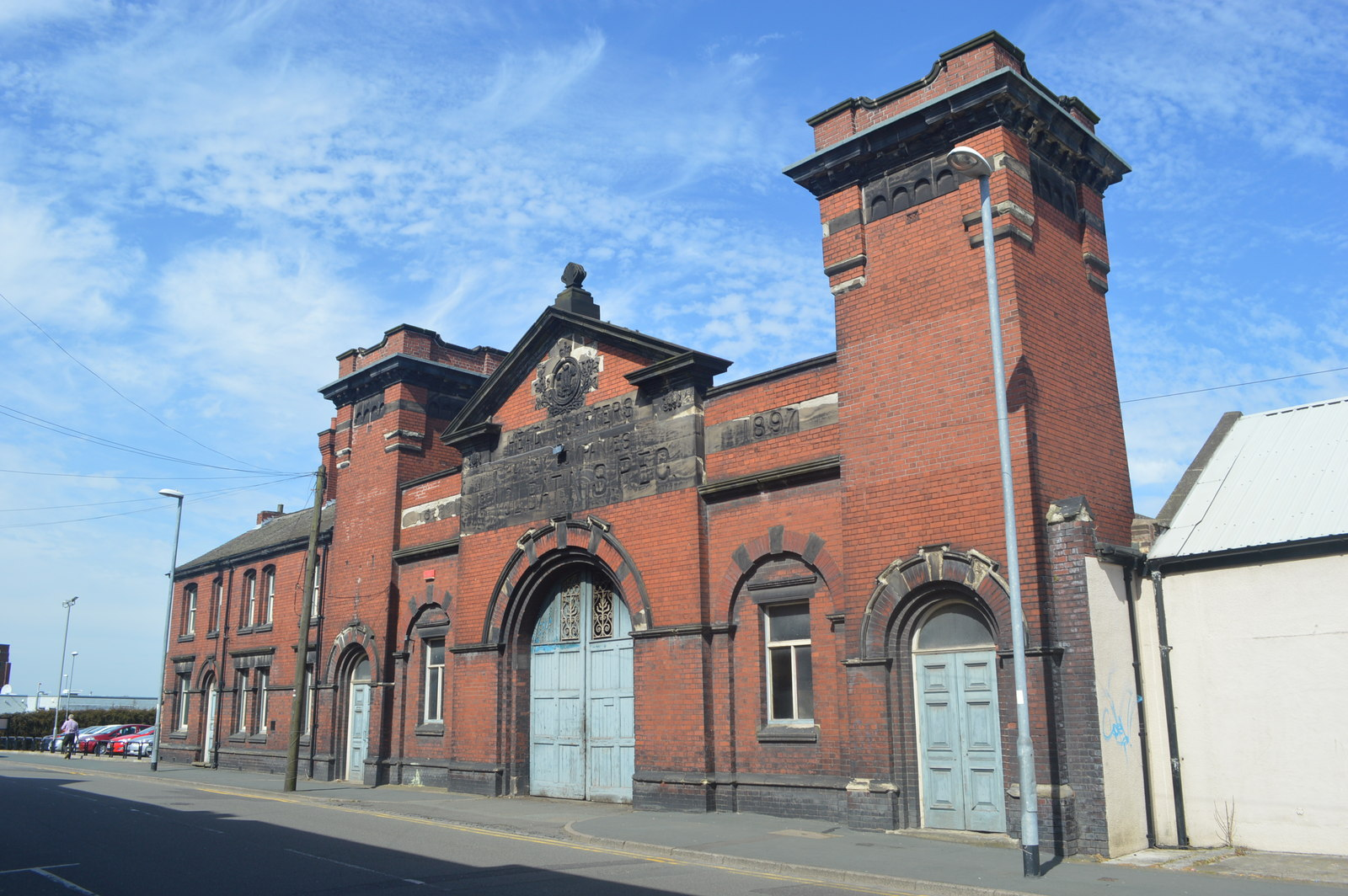
- College Road drill hall

Site information
- Type: Drill hall

Location
- Location within Staffordshire
- Coordinates: 53.01868°N 2.18026°W

Site history
- Built: 1903
- Built for: War Office
- In use: 1903-1961

The College Road drill hall is a former military installation at College Road (formerly Victoria Road) in Hanley, Stoke-on-Trent, Staffordshire.

== History ==
The building was designed as the headquarters of the 1st Volunteer Battalion, The North Staffordshire Regiment and opened by Lord Methuen in 1903. This unit evolved to become the 5th Battalion, The North Staffordshire Regiment in 1908. The battalion was mobilised at the drill hall in August 1914 before being deployed to the Western Front.

By the start of the Second World War the drill hall had become the home of 61st and 116th (North Midland) Field Regiments Royal Artillery. Although 116th Field Regiment was disbanded at the end of the war, 61st Field Regiment was reconstituted as 261 Observation Regiment in 1947 and renamed 261 (North Midland) Locating Regiment in 1951. It was reduced to battery strength as 887 Locating Battery at the College Road drill hall in 1956. After the unit moved to Newcastle-under-Lyme in 1961, the College Road drill hall was decommissioned and converted for industrial use.
