= John Thomas (VC) =

Recipient of the Victoria Cross

- Born: 10 May 1886; Manchester, Lancashire, England
- Died: 28 February 1954 (aged 67); Stockport, Cheshire, England
- Burial place: Stockport Borough Cemetery, Stockport
- Military career
- Allegiance: United Kingdom
- Branch: British Army
- Rank: Sergeant
- Units: North Staffordshire Regiment
- Conflicts: World War I
- Awards: Victoria Cross

John Thomas VC (10 May 1886 – 28 February 1954) was an English recipient of the Victoria Cross, the highest and most prestigious award for gallantry in the face of the enemy that can be awarded to British and Commonwealth forces.

== Details ==
He was 31 years old, and a Lance-Corporal in the 2/5th Battalion, Prince of Wales's (North Staffordshire Regiment), British Army during the First World War when the following deed took place for which he was awarded the VC.

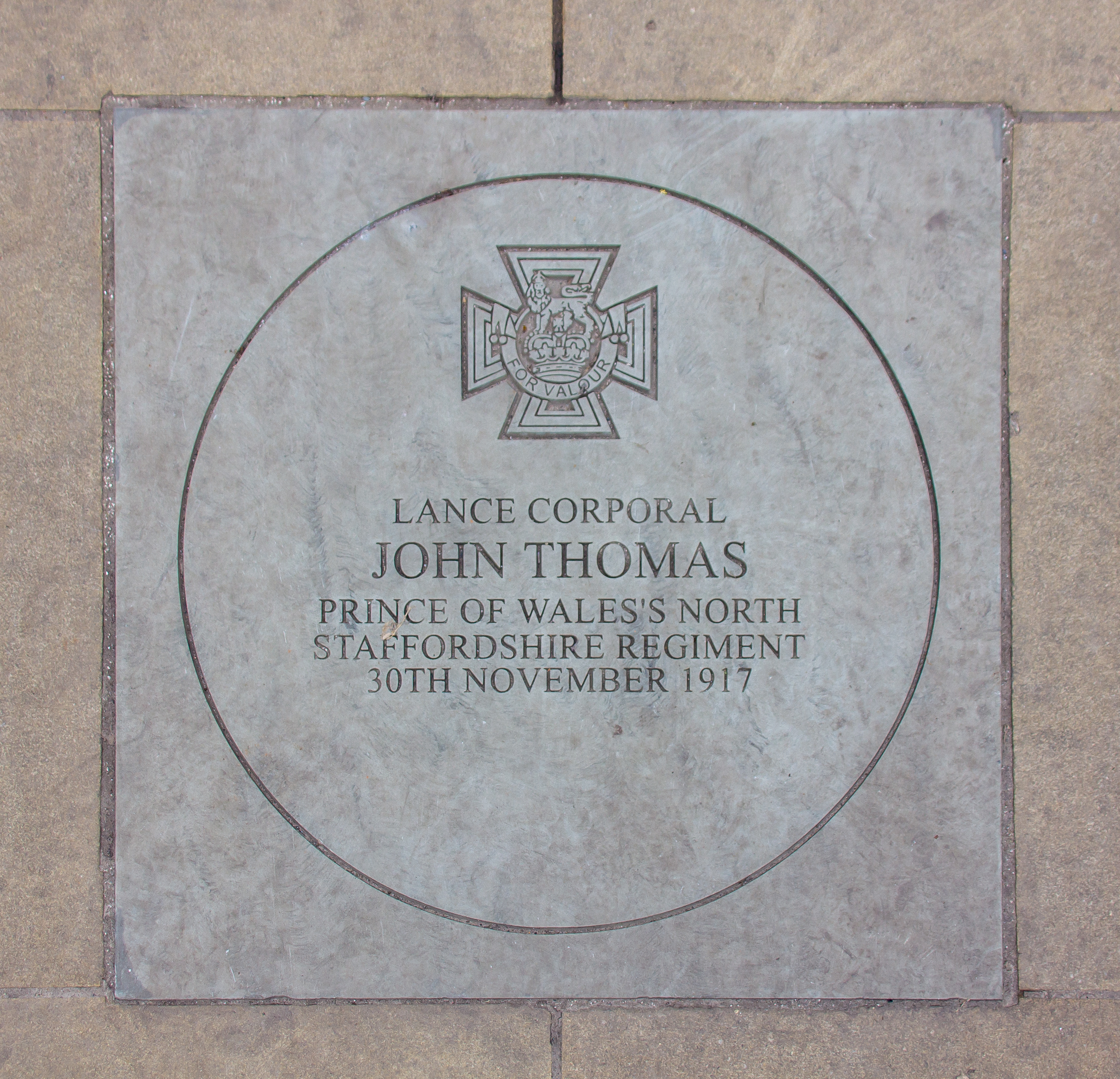
Plaque at the Manchester Cenotaph

On 30 November 1917 at Fontaine, France, Lance-Corporal Thomas saw the enemy making preparations for a counter-attack so with a comrade and on his own initiative decided to make a close reconnaissance. They went off in full view of the enemy and under heavy fire. His comrade was hit almost immediately, but Lance-Corporal Thomas went on alone and finally reached a building used by the enemy as a night post. He was able to see where their troops were congregating and after staying for an hour, sniping the enemy, returned with information of the utmost value, which enabled plans to be made to meet the counter-attack.

== Bibliography ==
- Monuments to Courage (David Harvey, 1999)
- The Register of the Victoria Cross (This England, 1997)
- Gliddon, Gerald (2004) [2012]. VCs of the First World War: Cambrai 1917. The History Press. ISBN 978-0-75-247668-1.
