= North Staffordshire Regiment =

English army regiment 1881–1959

Prince of Wales's (North Staffordshire Regiment) North Staffordshire Regiment (Prince of Wales's)
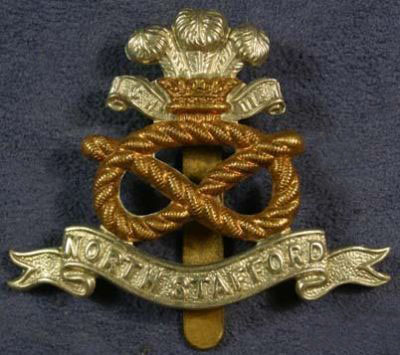
- Cap badge of the North Staffordshire Regiment.
- Active: 1881–1959
- Disbanded: 31 January 1959
- Country: United Kingdom
- Branch: British Army
- Type: Infantry
- Role: Line infantry
- Garrison/HQ: Whittington Barracks, Lichfield
- Nickname: The Black Knots
- Colors: Maroon, black and silver
- March: God Bless the Prince of Wales (slow march); The Days We Went a'Gypsying (quick march)
- Anniversaries: 31 July, Third Battle of Ypres

Commanders
- Colonel of the Regiment: The Prince of Wales

I have always thought that if one was prepared to take the rough with the smooth they would ultimately balance out, but this has not been the case with the North Staffordshire Regiment, who throughout their history, have had far too much of the rough and far too little of the smooth.

— Lieutenant-General Sir Brian Horrocks

The North Staffordshire Regiment (Prince of Wales's) was a line infantry regiment of the British Army that was in existence between 1881 and 1959. The 64th (2nd Staffordshire) Regiment of Foot was created on 21 April 1758 from the 2nd Battalion of the 11th Regiment of Foot. In 1881, under the Childers Reforms, the 64th Regiment of Foot was merged with the 98th (Prince of Wales's) Regiment of Foot (originally raised in 1824) to form the Prince of Wales's (North Staffordshire Regiment). In 1921 the regimental title was altered to the North Staffordshire Regiment (Prince of Wales's).

Formed at a time when the British Empire was reaching its peak, the regiment served all over the Empire, in times of both peace and war, and in many theatres of war outside the Empire. It fought with distinction in the First World War and the Second World War, as well as in other smaller conflicts around the world. These other wars included the Second Sudanese War, the Second Boer War, the Irish War of Independence and the Third Anglo-Afghan War.

In 1959, as part of a defence review, the North Staffordshire Regiment, by now reduced to only a single regular battalion, was amalgamated with the South Staffordshire Regiment to form the Staffordshire Regiment (Prince of Wales's) which was, in 2006, amalgamated with the Cheshire Regiment and the Worcestershire and Sherwood Foresters Regiment (29th/45th Foot) to form the Mercian Regiment. The traditions of the North Staffordshire Regiment are continued by the Mercian Regiment.

== Formation history ==
The Prince of Wales's (North Staffordshire) Regiment was formed under the Childers Reforms on 1 July 1881, by the amalgamation of the 64th (2nd Staffordshire) Regiment of Foot and 98th (Prince of Wales's) Regiment of Foot. These two regular regiments became, respectively, the 1st and 2nd battalions of the new regiment. The Militia and Rifle Volunteers forces of North Staffordshire were also incorporated into this new regiment, and a permanent depot was established at Whittington Barracks, Lichfield, which also housed the newly formed South Staffordshire Regiment.

The 64th Regiment of Foot was originally raised in 1756 as the 2nd Battalion of the 11th (Devonshire) Foot, and was renumbered the 64th in 1758. It had a long history of overseas service with much less time spent in Europe. It had served in the West Indies during the Seven Years' War, America during the American War of Independence, South America, the West Indies and Canada during the Napoleonic Wars. Subsequent long periods were spent in Ireland and the West Indies before action was seen in India during the Indian Mutiny. At the time of the forming of the amalgamation with the 98th Foot, the 64th was based in Ireland.

The 98th Regiment of Foot, raised in 1824 in Chichester, had a much shorter history, but like the 64th had spent the majority of its time overseas spending a long time in South Africa before seeing action in China in the First Anglo-Chinese (or Opium) War and India on the North West Frontier. It was based in Afghanistan when the amalgamation occurred.

The battalions that constituted the regiment in 1881 were as follows:

- 1st Battalion: 64th (2nd Staffordshire) Regiment of Foot;
- 2nd Battalion: 98th (Prince of Wales's) Regiment of Foot;
- 3rd (Militia) Battalion: King's Own (2nd Staffordshire) Light Infantry Militia, based in Stafford;
- 4th (Militia) Battalion: King's Own (3rd Staffordshire) Rifle Militia based in Newcastle-under-Lyme;
- 1st Volunteer Battalion: 2nd Staffordshire (Staffordshire Rangers) Rifle Volunteer Corps, based in Stoke-on-Trent;
- 2nd Volunteer Battalion: 5th Staffordshire Rifle Volunteer Corps, based in Lichfield but later moved to Burton-on-Trent.

== Volunteers and Territorials ==
The 2nd and 5th Staffordshire Rifle Volunteer Corps were designated the 1st and 2nd Volunteer battalions, North Staffordshire Regiment, in 1883. Together with the Volunteer battalions of the South Staffordshire Regiment, they formed the Staffordshire Volunteer Infantry Brigade in 1888. This brigade was intended to assemble at Wolverhampton in time of war, while in peacetime it acted as a focus for collective training of the Volunteers. On the formation of the Territorial Force in 1908, the two Volunteer battalions were renumbered as the 5th and 6th battalions of the North Staffordshire Regiment, forming part of the Staffordshire Brigade in the North Midland Division.

The reserve battalions of the regiment were also reorganised in 1908 by the Territorial and Reserve Forces Act 1907, with the two militia battalions being re-designated the 3rd (Special) and 4th (Special Reserve) battalions, and the volunteer battalions being re-designated as Territorial Force and renumbered as the 5th and 6th battalions (TF): they were based at College Road in Hanley and Horninglow Street in Burton upon Trent respectively.

== Early service (1881–1914) ==
=== Garrison duties and the Mahdist War ===
The 1st Battalion was stationed in Ireland at the time of the amalgamation. It moved to England in 1883, and the following year to the West Indies, based mainly in Barbados, but with detachments on other islands. It moved to Natal in 1887, to Mauritius in 1890, to Malta in 1893 and to Egypt in 1895. From there the 1st Battalion took part in operations in the Mahdist War under Lord Kitchener. During the campaign, the 1st Battalion were based initially at Wadi Halfa but moved to Gemai to avoid a cholera outbreak. In September the battalion took part in the action against the Dervish Army at Hafir, which was decisive in ending the campaign. As a result, the North Staffordshire Regiment received the unique "Hafir" battle honour, given to no other British regiment.

=== Second Boer War ===
The 2nd Battalion was stationed in India in 1881 when the North Staffordshire Regiment was formed, and remained there until 1886. During this time period, it took part in an expedition to the Zhob Valley in 1884, thus making it the first battalion in the regiment to see active service. In 1886, it returned to England via Aden, and then deployed to Ireland in 1893. In 1899, 2nd Battalion mobilised and moved to South Africa, where it took part in the Second Boer War. Forming part of 15th Brigade in the 7th Division, the majority of the battalion saw little action throughout the conflict, being mostly occupied in garrison duties in Johannesburg in 1900. In 1901, the battalion was part of a mobile column under Brigadier-General Dartnell in the Eastern Transvaal which carried out a scorched earth campaign.

More action was seen by the mounted infantry company of the regiment that had been formed on arrival in South Africa. In January 1900 Lord Roberts, commander of the British forces in South Africa, ordered that every infantry battalion in South Africa was to raise a company of mounted infantry. These companies were to be detached from their parent units and operate as part of eight independent mounted infantry battalions. The North Staffords company thus formed became part of the 8th Battalion, Mounted Infantry. This unit was involved in the pursuit of Koos de la Rey and was present when he was captured at Wildfontein. The militia and volunteer battalions also saw service in the Second Boer War. The 4th Battalion was deployed in the Cape Colony and later the Bechuanaland Protectorate before being replaced by the 3rd Battalion. Additionally, the two volunteer companies which formed from the 1st and 2nd Volunteer battalions served alongside the 2nd Battalion at various times. As a result of these contributions and those of the two regular battalions, the regiment was awarded the "South Africa 1900–1902" battle honour.

At the war's end in May 1902, the 2nd Battalion returned to England on the SS Galeka in October that year, but the home posting was brief. In the following year, it returned to India, where it remained until 1919.

=== Meeting in India ===
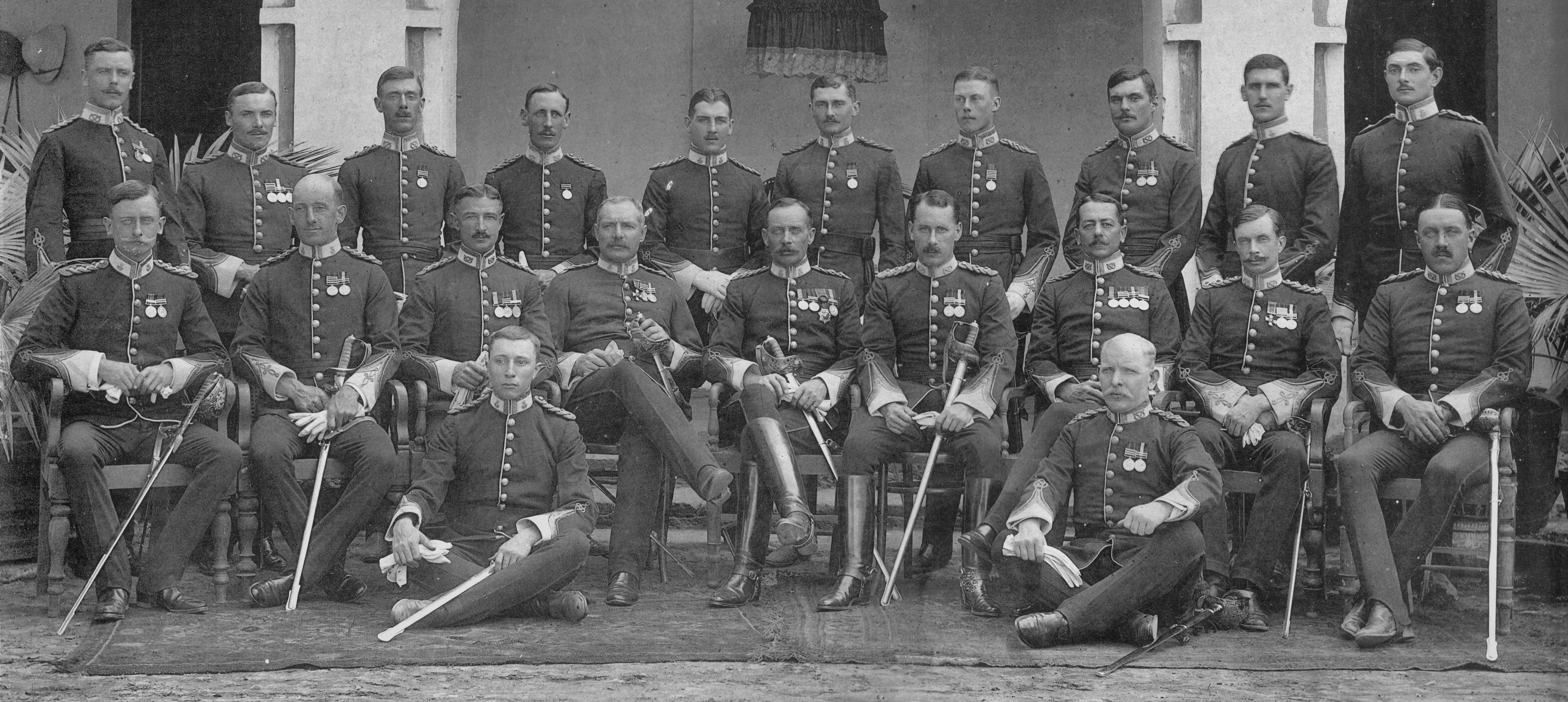
Officers of the 2nd Battalion, India, 1908.

The 1st Battalion was stationed in India from 1897 until 1903. The battalion was divided between barracks in Jhansi and Nowgong until late 1902, when it was reunited at Bombay. The following year, the 1st and 2nd battalions met for the first time, and no fewer than 590 men from the 1st Battalion were transferred to the 2nd Battalion. Thus the 1st Battalion was reduced to a small cadre, which served for nine years upon its return to Lichfield and other stations in England, before moving to Buttevant in Ireland in 1912.

== First World War (1914–1918) ==
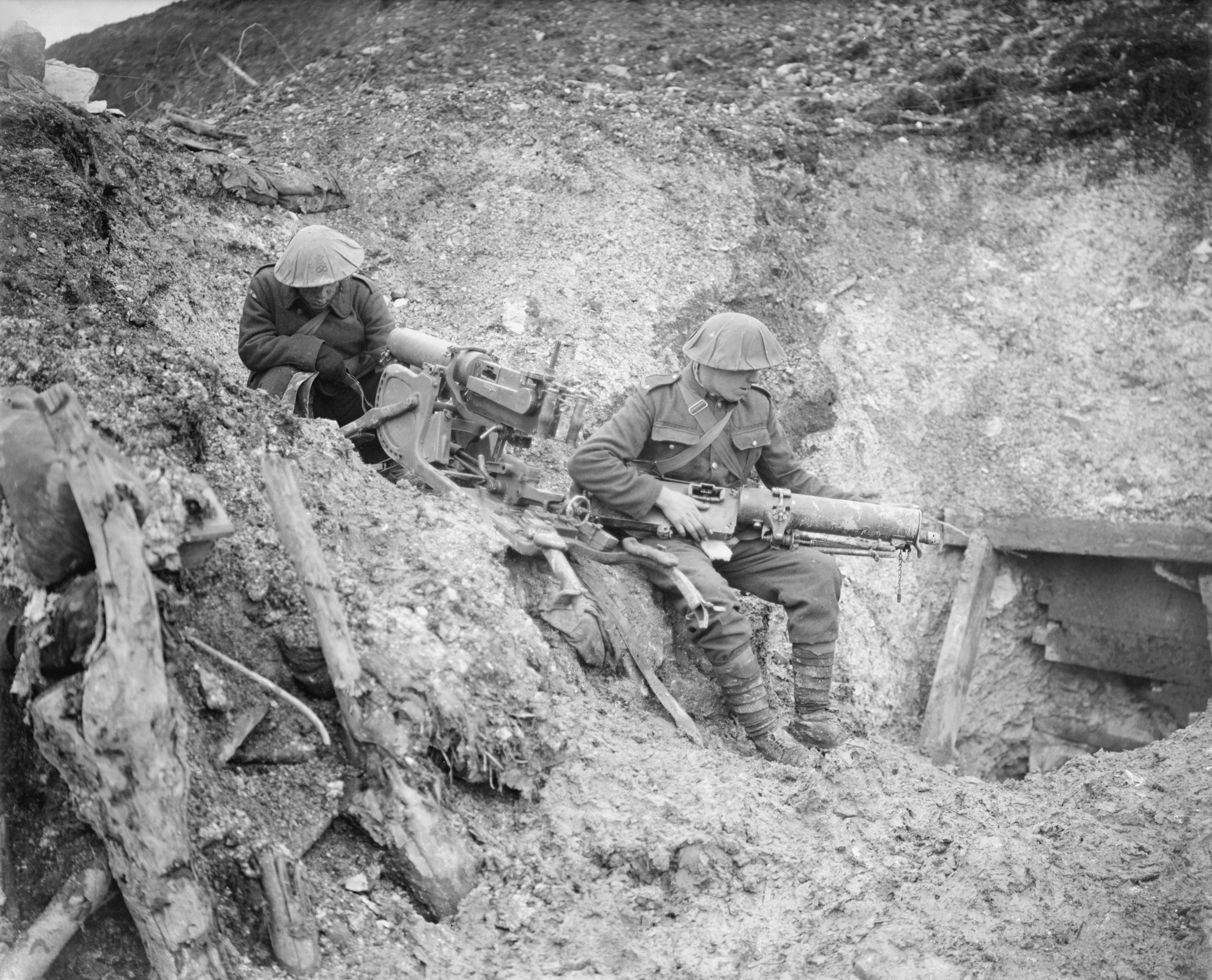
Battle of the Ancre. Two soldiers of the 8th (Service) Battalion examine captured machine guns outside a badly damaged German dugout at Beaucourt-sur-Ancre.

The North Staffordshire Regiment was heavily committed to the fighting during the First World War, and over the course of the conflict, was expanded to 18 battalions, some by duplication of the Territorial Force battalions and others, labelled "service" battalions raised as part of Field Marshal Kitchener's New Army. These battalions saw service in a number of theatres including on the Western Front, at Gallipoli, in the Middle East, and India. The following list details the involvement of these battalions:

- 1st Battalion – served in France from September 1914 until November 1918;
- 2nd Battalion – served in India throughout the war;
- 3rd (Reserve) Battalion – operated as a training battalion in the United Kingdom throughout the war;
- 4th (Extra Reserve) Battalion – garrison battalion in Guernsey 1914–1916. Returned to United Kingdom in 1916. Served in France 1917–1918;
- 1/5th Battalion Territorial Force (TF) – mobilised in 1914, and served in France from 1915 to 1918;
- 1/6th Battalion TF – mobilised in 1914, served in France from 1915 to 1918;
- 2/5th Battalion TF – formed in 1914, moved to Ireland in 1916 where it was involved in the Easter Rising, served in France 1917–1918. Merged with 1/5th Battalion in February 1918;
- 2/6th Battalion TF – formed in 1914, moved to Ireland in 1916 where it was involved in the Easter Rising, served in France 1917–1918. Merged with 1/6th Battalion in July 1918;
- 3/5th Battalion TF – formed in 1915. Renamed 5th (Reserve) Battalion in April 1916. Served as a training battalion in England 1915–1918;
- 3/6th Battalion TF – formed in 1915. Renamed 6th (Reserve) Battalion in April 1916. Merged with 5th (Reserve) Battalion in September 1916;
- 7th (Service) Battalion – formed in 1914. Took part in Gallipoli Campaign July 1915 – January 1916. Evacuated to Egypt. Served in Mesopotamia from February 1916. From July 1918 were part of North Persia Force (Dunsterforce) and ended the war in Baku, Azerbaijan.
- 8th (Service) Battalion – formed in 1914. Served in France 1915–1918;
- 9th (Service) Battalion (Pioneers) – formed as a service battalion in 1914. Became a pioneer battalion in 1915. Served in France and Belgium 1915–1919;
- 10th (Reserve) Battalion – formed as a service battalion in 1914. Became a reserve battalion in 1915. Renamed as 3rd Training Reserve Battalion of 1st Reserve Brigade in 1916;
- 11th (Reserve) Battalion – formed as a service battalion in 1914. Became a reserve battalion in 1915. Renamed as 4th Training Reserve Battalion of 1st Reserve Brigade in 1916;
- 12th (Garrison) Battalion – formed 1918 in France from 11th Garrison Guard Battalion. Renamed as a service battalion and continued to serve in France;
- 1st (Garrison) Battalion – formed in 1916. Served in France 1916–1918. Renamed 13th (Garrison) Battalion in July 1918;
- 2nd (Home Service Garrison) Battalion – formed in 1916. Became 17th Battalion Royal Defence Corps in 1917.

The numbering of the Territorial Force battalions was laid down by War Office instructions issued in 1914 and 1915. On joining the Territorial Force men were asked if they would serve overseas (foreign service) or just volunteered for service in the United Kingdom (home service) and their service records amended accordingly. At the declaration of war all Territorial battalions were mobilised and on 15 August 1914 the War Office issued instructions for those men who had volunteered for foreign service to be separated out into what were called first line battalions. Home service men were placed in second line battalions. Thus there would now be a first line 5th Battalion and a second line 5th Battalion. On 24 November 1914, as the first line battalions began to go overseas, additional instructions were issued allowing the raising of a third line battalion once the first line battalion was on foreign service. In January 1915 these designations were simplified and the battalions called the 1/5th, 2/5th and 3/5th battalions respectively.

The battalions that served in France took part in many of the major actions of the war including the 1915 Battle of Neuve Chapelle, the 1915 Battle of Loos, the Battle of the Somme in 1916, the Third Battle of Ypres in 1917 and the Battle of Amiens in 1918.

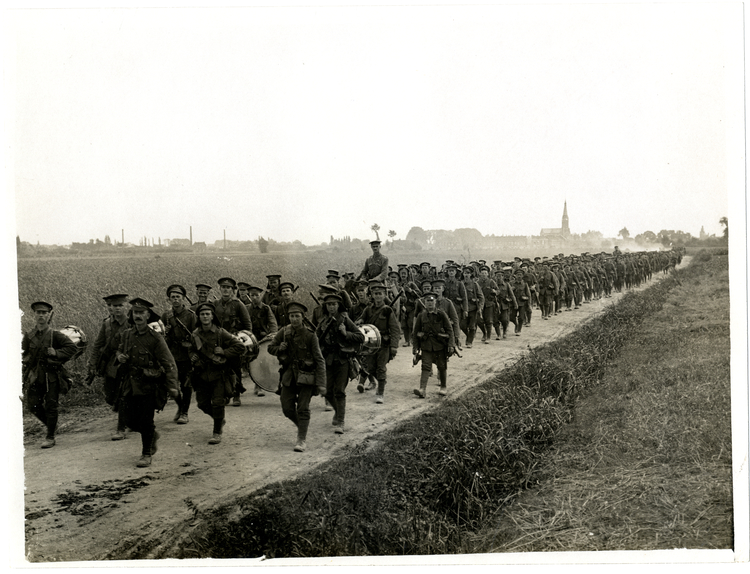
Men of the 8th (Service) Battalion on the march near Merville, France, 5 August 1915.

=== Military service ===
==== 1st Battalion ====
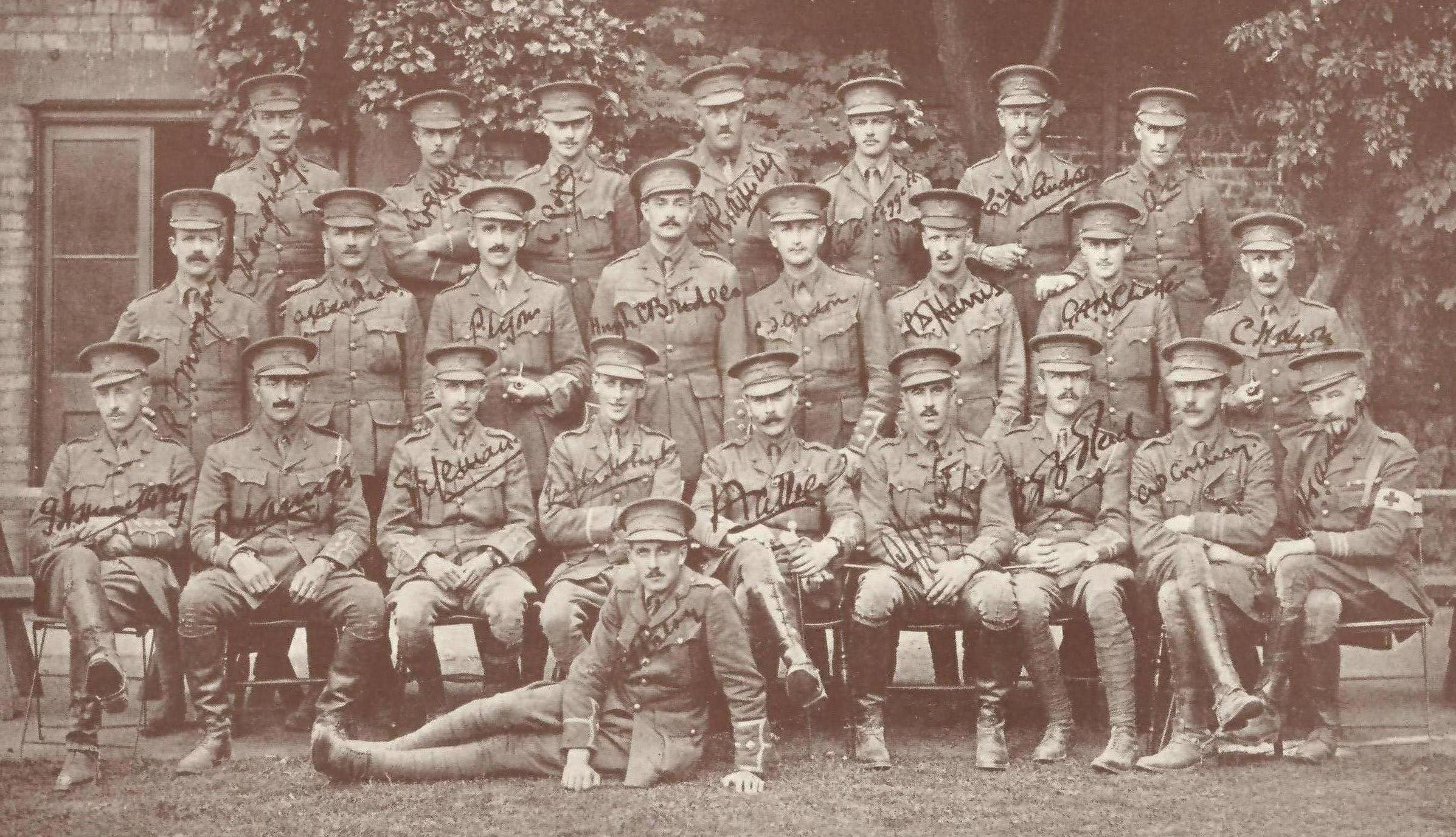
Officers of the 1st Battalion, photographed in Cambridge in August 1914, shortly before embarking for France on 8 September. Of those who sailed, only five would still be with the battalion by the end of January 1915, most of the remainder having been killed or wounded. Those pictured include Lieut.-Colonel V. W. de Falbe, D.S.O., Battalion Commanding Officer (seated row, centre); and junior subaltern 2nd Lieut. Vyvyan Pope, who later commanded the battalion June 1917–March 1918 (back row, third from left).

The 1st Battalion went to France in September 1914 as part of 17th Brigade in 6th Division. It took part in the First Battle of Ypres being based in the Armentières sector on the southern flank of the battle. In December 1914 it was in trenches in the Rue-du-Bois area (near Fleurbaix), and participated in the Christmas truce, where British and German soldiers fraternised in no man's land.

In March 1915 it carried out a successful action in the Battle of Neuve Chapelle, capturing the village of L'Epinette.

In October 1915 17th Brigade was exchanged with 71st Brigade of 24th Division, as part of an official policy of mixing Regular with New Army units. Immediately on joining 24th Division, the battalion was moved to 72nd Brigade within the same division. It was to remain part of this formation until the end of the war.

In April and June 1916 the battalion suffered casualties of well over 500 in two serious gas attacks, on both occasions when in trenches north of Wulverghem (near Messines).

In August–September 1916, the 24th Division participated in the Battle of the Somme. The 1st Battalion was engaged in the fighting around Guillemont and later the defence of Delville Wood, suffering a total of more than 350 casualties.

In June 1917, the battalion was involved (and suffered over 150 casualties) in the assault on Messines Ridge, one of the most successful British offensives of the war. This battle formed a prelude to the Third Battle of Ypres, when the battalion took part in the initial assault on 31 July 1917. Its objectives were to capture the German frontline trench called Jehovah trench, the second line trench called Jordan trench and the remains of Bulgar Wood. These three objectives were 1,000 yards (910 m), 1,500 yards (1,400 m) and 1,750 yards (1,600 m) from the British front line. The battalion managed to capture both trenches and a platoon reached Bulgar Wood before events around them forced a retreat from Bulgar Wood and Jordan trench. The battalion dug in on the Jehovah trench line having lost 11 officers and 258 other ranks as casualties, almost 50% of the battalion strength. After the war, the anniversary of this attack became the main Regimental Day.

On 21 March 1918, the 1st Battalion was in front-line trenches near Saint-Quentin when the German Army launched Operation Michael, the opening attack in their Spring Offensive. The battalion was virtually wiped out, losing 19 officers and 662 men in the attack itself and the withdrawal which followed. The battalion was subsequently re-formed, and in the last weeks of the war in October 1918 took part in the Battle of the Selle, in which it suffered nearly 200 casualties.

==== 2nd Battalion ====
The 2nd Battalion was one of only eight regular battalions of the British Army to remain in India throughout the war. It took part in operations on the North West Frontier in 1915, as a result of which the regiment was awarded the battle honour "North West Frontier, India, 1915". Amusingly, the commanding officer at this time was Major Fox and the adjutant Captain Squirell. Although it was a Regular Army battalion, it received very few replacements during the war. After the 1915 North West Frontier campaign the battalion comprised only a HQ company and four rifle companies. By 1919 the strength of the regiment was reduced by a third compared to the pre-war establishment with 20 officers and 538 enlisted men on the regimental roll. Over 60% of the enlisted men had joined the battalion since the 1915 campaign and only five officers fought in both the 1915 campaign and the Third Anglo-Afghan War in 1919.

==== 1/5th and 1/6th Battalions ====
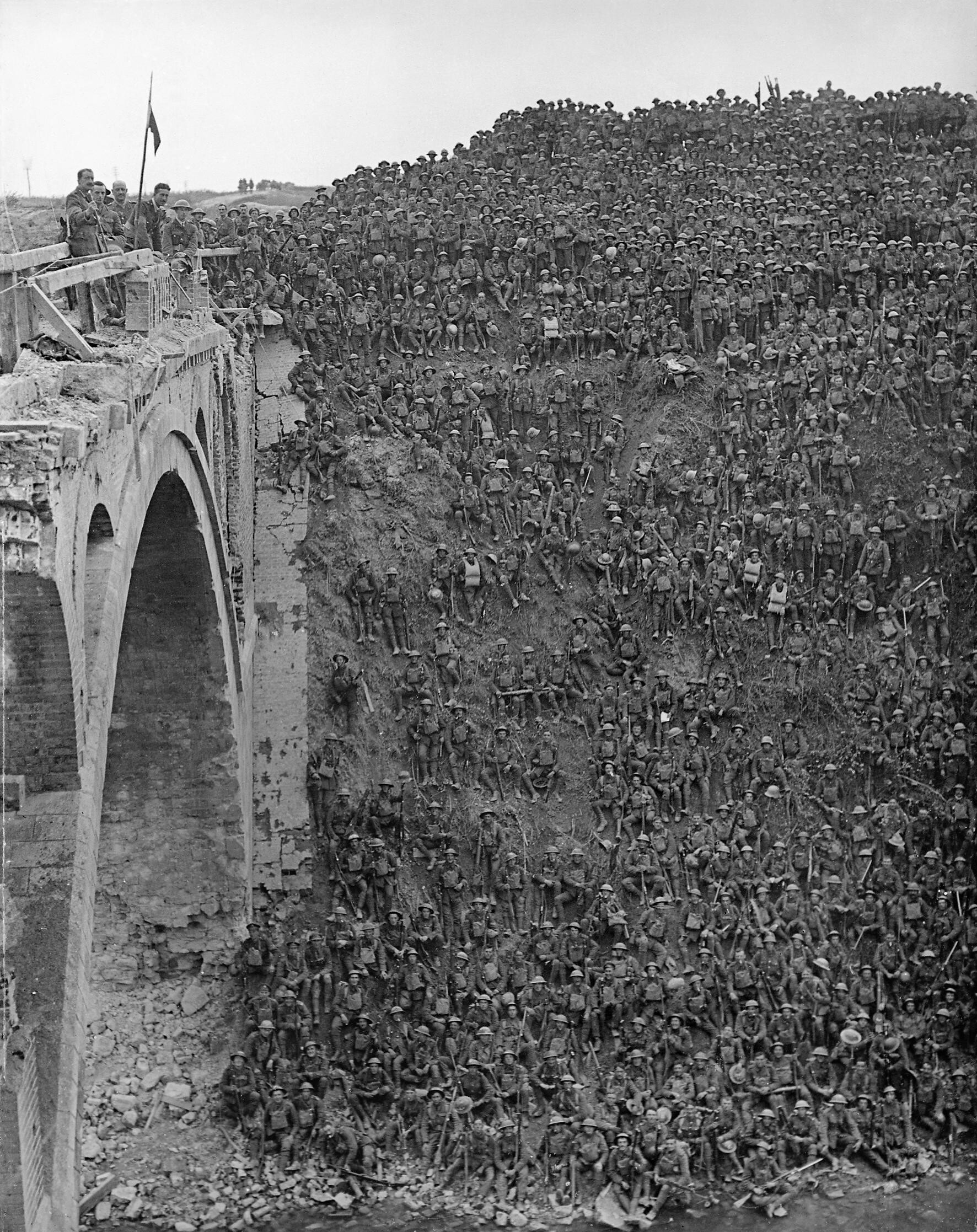
137th Brigade (including 1/6th Battalion North Staffs) at the Riqueval Bridge on the St Quentin Canal, October 1918

The 1/5th and 1/6th battalions arrived in France in February 1915 as part of 137th (Staffordshire) Brigade of 46th (North Midland) Division. Among the first Territorial Force (TF) units to go to France, these two battalions took part in the 1915 Battle of Loos, especially the battles around the Hohenzollern Redoubt in 1915, and at Gommecourt on the northern flank of the Battle of the Somme.

By September 1918 the 1/5th Battalion had been reduced to a cadre and had been transferred away from 46th Division. The 1/6th remained and with the rest of 137th Brigade took part in the storming of the St Quentin Canal. It was a company of the 1/6th Battalion, led by Captain Arthur Humphrey Charlton, that seized the Riqueval Bridge over the St Quentin Canal on 29 September before the Germans could fire the explosive charges, an action for which Charlton was decorated with the Distinguished Service Order.

==== 2/5th and 2/6th battalions ====
King George V inspecting the remnants of the 2nd/6th Battalion, North Staffordshire Regiment, at Gauchin, France, 30 March 1918.

These two 2nd line TF battalions, both duplicates of the 1/5th and 1/6th battalions and raised in 1914, served mainly with the 176th (2/1st Staffordshire) Brigade of the 59th (2nd North Midland) Division throughout the war.

==== 12th Battalion ====
The 12th Battalion formed part of 40th Division and served in France on the River Lys during the advance in Flanders (18 August to 6 September 1918) and the Fifth Battle of Ypres, and in France and Belgium during the final weeks of the war.

=== Awards and decorations ===
Altogether, the regiment was awarded 52 battle honours, but it was ruled that only ten could be carried on the colours.

==== Victoria Crosses ====
Four Victoria Crosses were awarded to men of the North Staffordshire Regiment during World War I:

- Sergeant John Carmichael, 9th Battalion; for gallantry on 8 September 1917 during the Third Battle of Ypres;
- Lance-Corporal William Harold Coltman, 1/6th Battalion; for gallantry on the nights of 3 & 4 October 1918 near Sequehart, France;
- Acting Lieutenant Colonel Edward Elers Delaval Henderson, 7th Battalion (attached 9th Battalion Royal Warwickshire Regiment); for gallantry on 25 January 1917 in Mesopotamia. This award was made posthumously;
- Lance-Corporal John Thomas, 2/5th Battalion for gallantry on 30 November 1917 during the Battle of Cambrai.

=== Reputation for profanity ===
Even by the standards of the British Army, the Regiment (and the 1st Battalion in particular) seems to have gained a reputation during the First World War for profane language. When the 1st Battalion was relieved in the front line following its defence of Delville Wood in September 1916, one of the advanced posts was missed out by mistake. The Lance-Corporal in command, suspecting something was amiss, sent a man back to the front-line trench to investigate. The soldier realised he was at some risk of being shot by his own side, and so "when he had crawled within shouting distance he enquired politely but firmly what —— bastards were holding that —— trench. The 9th East Surreys, who were the troops thus addressed, recognised the North Stafford idiom and let him in unhurt". Bernard Martin, who served as a 2nd Lieutenant with the 1st Battalion, records another incident which probably took place in 1917, when (very unusually) the battalion was addressed at a church parade by a general, who railed against "the disgusting word many of you utter every time you speak. ... I tell you again this indecent word is not to be used any longer. It is so common amongst you that it has become the shameful nickname by which your battalion is known throughout my Division". As the parade ended, one soldier was heard to ask, "What was that bugger gassing about?"; to which another replied, "Buggered if I know, I was having a kip. Where's the old bugger gone now?".

== Interwar years (1918–1939) ==
The 1st Battalion was posted to the Curragh, Ireland after the armistice, becoming involved in the Irish War of Independence until 1922, when it moved to Gibraltar. In the following year it was moved to Thrace, where it played a peace-keeping role in the conflict between Greek and Turkish forces. In 1923 it moved to India and remained in the Far East until 1948.

The 2nd Battalion was stationed in India in 1919, when Afghan forces crossed the border and occupied some Indian territory, sparking the brief Third Anglo-Afghan War. During the conflict, the battalion was involved very early on, firstly in the investing of Peshawar, where Afghan sympathisers were mooting a holy war and on 11 May 1919 when they were involved in a bayonet charge on the Afghan forces at Bagh, near Landi Kotal. For their involvement, the regiment received the battle honour "Afghanistan NWF 1919". The battalion returned to England via Egypt and the Sudan in 1921, and was quickly redeployed to Ireland. On the establishment of the Irish Free State in 1922, it returned to the regimental depot at Lichfield. Until 1939, it spent time in "home stations". Apart from England, this included service in Gibraltar from 1930 to 1932 and a year in Palestine in 1936–7.

The 3rd and 4th (Special Reserve) Battalions were placed in suspended animation in 1921, finally being disbanded in 1953.

The Territorial Force was reconstituted as the Territorial Army in 1920, and the 5th and 6th battalions were reformed, still with the 137th (Staffordshire) Brigade of 46th (North Midland) Division. In 1936, the 5th Battalion was converted to an anti-aircraft searchlight unit of the Royal Engineers as 41st (North Staffordshire Regiment) Anti-Aircraft Battalion while remaining 'part of the corps of the North Staffordshire Regiment'. It was transferred to the Royal Artillery in August 1940 as the 41st (5th North Staffordshire) Searchlight Regiment TA. In the same year the remaining 6th Battalion was transferred to 166th Infantry Brigade, 55th (West Lancashire) Infantry Division after the HQ of the 46th Division became 2nd Anti-Aircraft Division. Throughout the spring and summer of 1939, due to the increasing threat posed by Nazi Germany, the size of the Territorial Army was doubled, and the 6th Battalion formed a duplicate 7th Battalion.

In 1921, the regimental title was altered to The North Staffordshire Regiment (The Prince of Wales's). In 1937, the black facings formerly worn by the 64th Foot were restored, replacing the white colour that had been imposed on all non-royal English regiments in 1881.

The London, Midland and Scottish Railway renamed one of their Royal Scot class locomotives, number 6141 (formerly Caledonian), after the regiment.

== Second World War (1939–1945) ==
In September 1939, the North Staffordshire Regiment consisted of two Regular and two Territorial battalions – the 1st and 2nd Regular and the 6th and 7th Territorials. Following the outbreak of the Second World War on 3 September 1939, the regiment was expanded as it had been during the First World War. This expansion, however, was limited this time only to the addition of two more battalions – the 8th and 9th battalions, of which both were raised in 1940 but later converted to other roles. The roles of the two regular battalions were reversed this time, with the 1st Battalion serving in India and Burma throughout the war, while the 2nd Battalion were deployed in North Africa and Italy.

The North Staffordshire Regiment was awarded 22 battle honours for the Second World War but, as at the end of the First World War, only 10 could be displayed on the colours.

=== Regular Army ===
The 1st Battalion was in British India on the outbreak of the Second World War and saw no action until 1942, when one company that was stationed on the Andaman Islands were involved in the defence of the islands during the Japanese invasion. In 1943, the battalion served for six months in Burma, with the 36th Indian Infantry Brigade, part of the 26th Indian Infantry Division, before being withdrawn to India again. For the rest of the war, the battalion was employed mainly on internal security duties and saw no further action.

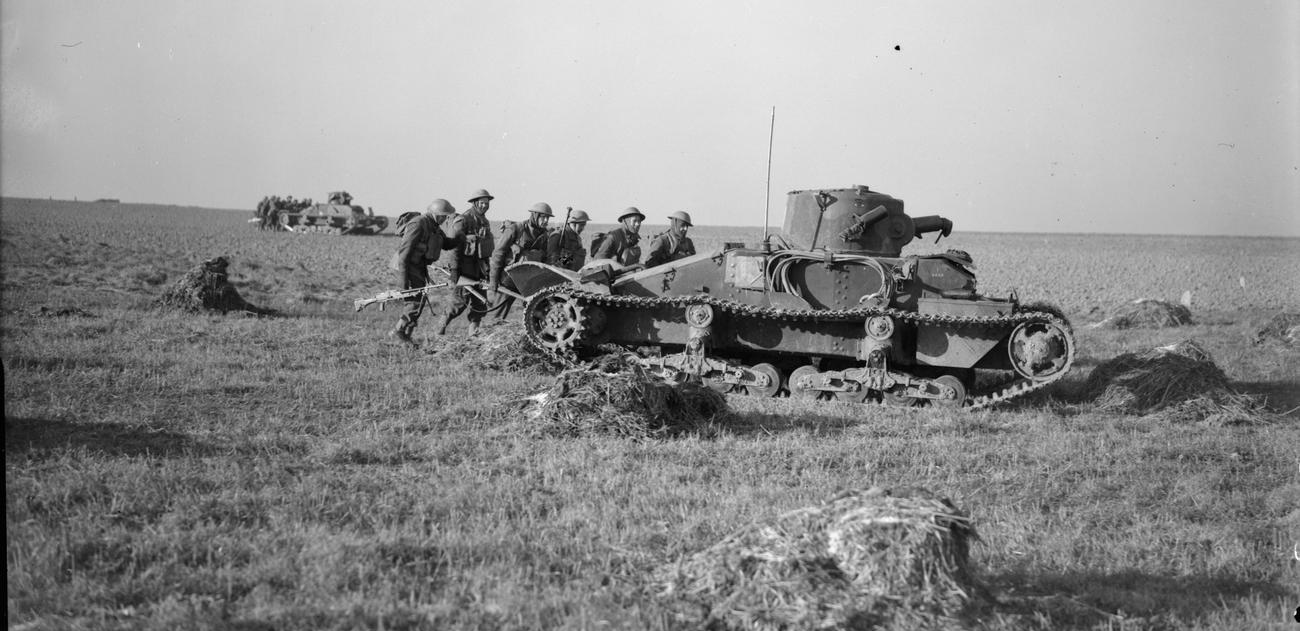
Troops of the 2nd Battalion on exercise with the Royal Tank Regiment in France, 1940

The 2nd Battalion, under the command of Lieutenant Colonel Donald Butterworth, was sent to France shortly after the outbreak of war in September 1939 as part of the 2nd Infantry Brigade (alongside the 1st Loyal Regiment and 1st Gordon Highlanders), 1st Infantry Division and was part of the British Expeditionary Force (BEF), and was involved in the battles of France and Belgium before eventually being evacuated from Dunkirk on 1 June 1940. Following that, the 2nd Battalion spent years on home defence in the United Kingdom preparing for a possible German invasion of England which never arrived. The battalion remained in the United Kingdom until 1943 when, still as part of 1st Infantry Division, it sailed to North Africa and took part in the campaign in Tunisia, British First Army. The battalion did not participate in the invasion of Sicily or the initial invasion of Italy but was one of the lead units in the Anzio landings in January 1944, under command of US Fifth Army, where they suffered extremely heavy casualties. On 7 February the battalion suffered 323 casualties attempting to capture Buonriposo Ridge which they captured but were forced to surrender the ridge after expending their ammunition. By May, following Operation Diadem, the battalion had absorbed eight drafts of replacements. Now fighting as part of the British Eighth Army, the 2nd Battalion continued to serve in Italy, fighting around the Gothic Line, until January 1945 when the battalion and the rest of 1st Infantry Division were transferred to Palestine.

=== Territorial Army ===
The 41st (5th North Staffordshire Regiment) Searchlight Regiment, Royal Engineers, previously the 5th North Staffords, served in Anti-Aircraft Command as part of the air defence of the Midlands from 1939 to 1944. The regiment became the first complete searchlight regiment to land in Normandy after the D-Day landings of 6 June 1944. It served with 21st Army Group, as part of 31st (North Midland) Anti-Aircraft Brigade, until the end of the war in Europe and then undertook garrison duty in Lower Saxony.

The two Territorial battalions formed part of 176th Infantry Brigade (which included both the 6th and 7th North Staffords and the 7th South Staffords) of 59th (Staffordshire) Infantry Division. The division trained in the United Kingdom for many years until it landed in Normandy in June 1944 as part of Operation Overlord where they fought in the Battle for Caen and gained an excellent reputation during Operation Charnwood and the Second Battle of the Odon. However, only the 6th Battalion landed in France as the 7th Battalion had been transferred elsewhere in 1942, being replaced in the 176th Brigade by the 7th Royal Norfolks. The 6th Battalion had been in France for less than two months when, in August 1944, along with other infantry units of 59th Division, it was broken up to supply replacements to other British units, due to a severe shortage of infantry replacements throughout the Army at the time. The 7th Battalion, upon leaving 59th Division, served with the 207th and 228th Infantry brigades in the Orkney and Shetland islands in 1943–1945, and later the 25th Brigade, before being transferred in 1945 as an administrative unit in the 183rd Brigade within the 61st Infantry Division and, in 1945 after the war in Europe was over, was preparing for a move to the Far East to fight the Japanese but they surrendered before the division arrived. The battalion was disbanded after the war in 1947.

=== Hostilities-only ===
The 8th Battalion was initially raised as a training battalion in 1940 and was assigned to the 205th Independent Infantry Brigade (Home) and was mainly concerned in home defence duties. The 8th Battalion was transferred to the Royal Artillery in March 1942 and converted to the 180th Field Regiment. The regiment served with the 48th Infantry (Reserve) Division in a training role until it was disbanded in August 1944.

The 9th Battalion was, like the 8th Battalion, also initially raised as a training battalion, and was assigned to the 224th Independent Infantry Brigade (Home). The 9th Battalion was transferred to the Royal Armoured Corps in December 1941, becoming 154th Regiment Royal Armoured Corps, retaining their North Staffords cap badge on the black beret of the Royal Armoured Corps, as did all other infantry units converted in this way. The regiment was assigned to 36th Army Tank Brigade alongside RAC regiments converted from infantry battalions. However, the regiment was disbanded in July 1943.

== Postwar service (1945–1959) ==
Following the independence of India in 1947, all infantry regiments in the British Army were reduced to a single regular battalion. Accordingly, the 1st Battalion left India to take part in a ceremony officially amalgamating with the 2nd Battalion in Egypt in 1948. The new 1st Battalion remained in Egypt until 1950, when it returned to the depot in Staffordshire. A year later, the battalion was posted to the disputed port city of Trieste. In 1953, the battalion was transferred to Korea, where they were stationed on garrison duties as part of the United Nations force established at the end of the Korean War. In 1954, it moved to Hong Kong, where the regiment's 200th anniversary was celebrated in 1956.

== Amalgamation ==
In July 1957, a defence review was announced, which resulted in the amalgamation of the North Staffordshire Regiment with the South Staffordshire Regiment, with the new regiment becoming part of the new administrative Mercian Brigade. The amalgamation of the 1st Battalions of the two regiments took place on 31 January 1959 at Minden, Germany, to form the 1st Battalion, Staffordshire Regiment (The Prince of Wales's).

In 1947, 41 Searchlight Regiment was reformed in the Territorial Army as 576 (5th Bn, The North Staffordshire Regiment) Searchlight Regiment RA (TA), later becoming 576 Light Anti-Aircraft/Searchlight Regiment (576 LAA/SL). When AA Command was disbanded in 1955 and the number of air defence units reduced, 576 LAA/SL Regiment was amalgamated with 349 (Lancashire Yeomanry) LAA and 493 Heavy Anti-Aircraft Regiments as 441 LAA/SL Regiment.

The 6th Battalion continued as a Territorial unit of the new regiment without a change of title. In 1961, it merged with the 441st Light Anti Aircraft Regiment, Royal Artillery, the successor to the 5th North Staffords, to become the 5th/6th Battalion. The combined battalion was abolished in 1967 on the creation of the Territorial and Army Volunteer Reserve in 1967.

The Staffordshire Regiment only had a separate existence from 1959 to 2007. As part of the reforms proposed in the 2003 Defence White Paper, Delivering Security in a Changing World, the regiment was merged with the Cheshire Regiment and the Worcestershire and Sherwood Foresters Regiment to form the Mercian Regiment. The amalgamation took place on 1 September 2007 in Tamworth Castle Grounds, when the Staffordshire Regiment became the 3rd Battalion, the Mercian Regiment. Subsequently, in 2014, The Mercian Regiment reduced its number of regular battalions from three to two, with the 3rd Battalion being disbanded and the personnel being redeployed into the 1st and 2nd Battalions.

== Regimental museum ==
The Staffordshire Regiment Museum is based at Whittington Barracks near Lichfield.

== Battle honours ==
The following lists all battle honours awarded to the Regiment or inherited by the regiment from the 64th Foot and 98th Foot.

Prior to 1914 all battle honours awarded to a unit were displayed upon the colours. However the number of battle honours awarded during the First World War was such that it was ordered that no more than 24 honours were to be carried on the colours, of which no more than 10 were to be honours relating to the First World War. Similarly, following the Second World War it was ordered that up to 10 honours relating to that conflict could be displayed on the colours, in addition to honours already carried. The choice of the honours to be displayed were at the discretion of regimental committees. The honours chosen by the North Staffordshire Regiment to be carried on the colours are shown in capitals in the following list.

=== Honours awarded to the 64th Foot ===
- GUADALOUPE 1759
- MARTINIQUE 1794
- ST LUCIA 1803
- SURINAM
- RESHIRE
- BUSHIRE
- KOOSH-AB
- PERSIA
- LUCKNOW

=== Honours awarded to the 98th Foot ===
- The DRAGON superscribed CHINA
- PUNJAUB

=== 1881–1914 ===
- HAFIR
- SOUTH AFRICA 1900–1902

=== 1914–1919 ===
- ARMENTIERES 1914
- SOMME 1916, 1918
- ARRAS 1917
- MESSINES 1917, 1918
- YPRES, 1918
- ST. QUENTIN CANAL
- SELLE
- SARI BAIR
- KUT AL AMARA 1917
- NORTH-WEST FRONTIER INDIA 1915
- AFGHANISTAN NWF 1919
- Aisne 1914, 1918
- Loos
- Albert 1916, 1918
- Bazentin
- Delville Wood
- Pozières
- Guillemont
- Ancre Heights
- Ancre 1916
- Scarpe 1917
- Arleux
- Pilckem
- Langemarck 1917
- Menin Road
- Polygon Wood
- Broodseinde
- Poelcapelle
- Passchendaele
- Cambrai 1917, 1918
- St Quentin
- Bapaume 1918
- Rosières
- Avre
- Lys
- Bailleul
- Kemmel
- Hindenburg Line
- Havrincourt
- Canal du Nord
- Beau-revoir
- Courtrai
- Valenciennes
- Sambre
- France and Flanders 1914–18
- Suvla
- Gallipoli 1915–16
- Egypt 1916
- Tigris 1916
- Baghdad
- Mesopotamia 1916–18
- Baku
- Persia 1918

=== 1939–1945 ===
- DYLE
- YPRES-COMINES CANAL
- CAEN
- BRIEUX BRIDGEHEAD
- MEDJEZ PLAIN
- NORTH AFRICA 1943
- ANZIO
- ROME
- MARRADI
- BURMA 1943
- Defence of Escaut
- Orne
- Noyers
- Mont Pinçon
- North-West Europe 1940, 1944
- Djebel Kess Kiss
- Gueriat al Atach Ridge
- Gab Gab Gap
- Carroceto
- Advance to Tiber
- Gothic Line
- Italy 1944–5

== Regimental Colonels ==
Colonels of the Regiment were:

- 1881–1904: (1st Battalion only to 1891) Gen. Charles Algernon Lewis
- 1881–1891: (2nd Battalion) Gen. Sir Robert Percy Douglas, Bt.
- 1904–1905: Gen. Francis Peyton, CB
- 1905–1911: Gen. Sir George Digby Barker, GCB
- 1911–1921: Maj-Gen. Thomas Francis Lloyd
- 1921–1936: Maj-Gen. Sir Arthur Reginald Hoskins, KCB, CMG, DSO
- 1936–1945: Brig-Gen. Louis John Wyatt, DSO
- 1945–1955: Maj-Gen. William Donovan Stamer, CB, CBE, DSO, MC
- 1955–1958: Brig. (Hon. Maj-Gen.) Charles Roger Alan Swynnerton, CB, DSO
- 1958–1959: Brig. Gerald Ernest Thubron, DSO, OBE

*1959 Regiment amalgamated with the South Staffordshire Regiment to form the Staffordshire Regiment

== Football ==
The 2nd Battalion's football team was a member of the Irish Football League for three seasons, 1896–99, while the battalion was stationed at the Victoria Barracks, Belfast.

== See also ==
- Category:North Staffordshire Regiment officers
- Category:North Staffordshire Regiment soldiers
