= Mercian Volunteers =

- Active: 1967–1988
- Allegiance: United Kingdom
- Branch: British Army
- Role: Line Infantry
- Size: Two battalions
- Garrison/HQ: 1st Battalion – Walsall; 2nd Battalion – Shirley

The Mercian Volunteers was a Territorial Army infantry regiment of the British Army, in existence from 1967 to 1988. Upon formation, it consisted of a singular battalion, however it later raised a second in 1975.

== Formation ==
The regiment was formed on 1 April 1967, as the successor to Territorial Army infantry battalions of the Mercian Brigade that had been reduced under the 1966 Defence White Paper and formation of the TAVR. Its initial structure was:

- HQ Company (Staffordshire), at Walsall
  (from 5th Battalion, South Staffordshire Regiment)
- A Company (Cheshire), at Stockport Armoury, Stockport
  (from 4th Battalion, Cheshire Regiment and 7th Battalion, Cheshire Regiment)
- B Company (Worcestershire), at The Shrubbery, Kidderminster
  (from 7th Battalion, Worcestershire Regiment)
- C Company (Staffordshire), at Horninglow Street drill hall, Burton-on-Trent
  (from 5th/6th Battalion, North Staffordshire Regiment)
- D Company (Sherwood Foresters), at Nottingham
  (from 5th/8th Battalion, Sherwood Foresters)

In 1971 a fifth company, E Company (Cheshire), was raised from the cadre of 4th/7th Battalion, Cheshire Regiment.

== 1st Battalion ==
Upon the formation of the 2nd Battalion on 1 April 1975, the original unit was designated as the 1st Battalion of the regiment with its headquarters at Wolseley House in Wolverhampton. It also lost E Company (Cheshire) to the newly raised battalion. The battalion's structure afterwards was as follows:

- HQ Company, at Wolseley House, Wolverhampton; Mortar Platoon at Droitwich Spa and Anti-Tank Platoon at Sutton-in-Ashfield
- A Company (Cheshire), at Stockport Armoury, Stockport
- B Company (Worcestershire), at The Shrubbery, Kidderminster and Worcester
- C Company (Staffordshire), at Burton-on-Trent and Rugeley
- D Company (Sherwood Foresters), at Nottingham

The Home Service Force, a home defence unit, established in 1982 at the height of the Cold War, saw each Territorial infantry battalion raise a company of HSF soldiers; this led to the formation of G (HSF) Company at Kidderminster.

In the late 1980s, the decision was made to place control of the territorial infantry units back under the control of the local county-line infantry regiments and so the battalion was broken up, and the companies used as the foundation blocks for building these new battalions. The companies were broken up as follows: HQ and C Companies to 3rd (Volunteer) Battalion, Staffordshire Regiment, retaining their lettering; B and D Companies to 4th (Volunteer) Battalion, Worcestershire and Sherwood Foresters, with the same lettering; A Company to 3rd (Volunteer) Battalion, Cheshire Regiment, as the same; and G (HSF) Company absorbed by F (HSF) Company, 4th (Volunteer) Battalion, Worcestershire and Sherwood Foresters.

== 2nd Battalion ==
The 2nd Battalion was formed on 1 April 1975, mostly from the Light Infantry and Mercian Volunteers. Its structure upon formation was:

- HQ Company, at Shirley
- A Company, at Silver Street in Worcester, and Stourport-on-Severn
  (from A Company, Light Infantry and Mercian Volunteers)
- B Company, at Stoke-on-Trent and Crewe
  (from B company, Light Infantry and Mercian Volunteers)
- C Company, at Ellesmere Port and Northwich
  (from E Company, 1st Battalion, Mercian Volunteers)
- D Company, at Whittimere Street drill hall, Walsall
  (from E Company, Light Infantry and Mercian Volunteers)

Along with the 1st Battalion, the 2nd Battalion also raised a Home Service Force company in 1984, namely F (HSF) Company at Worcester.

As described above, the 2nd Battalion was also broken up as follows: A and F (HSF) Companies to 4th (Volunteer) Battalion, Worcestershire and Sherwood Foresters, with the same lettering; B and D Companies to 3rd (Volunteer) Battalion, Staffordshire Regiment, retaining the lettering; C Company to 3rd (Volunteer) Battalion, Cheshire Regiment, as the same.

== Honorary Colonels ==
1st Battalion

- 1975–1980: Colonel Edward R.W. Tooby, OBE, MC, TD
- 1980–1988: Colonel Charles J. Baines, CBE, MC, TD, DL

2nd Battalion

- 1975–1979: Major-General James H.S. Majury, CB, MBE
- 1979–1987: Colonel Anthony B. Griffiths, TD, ADC
- 1987–1988: Captain Thomas R. Dunne, JP

=== Deputy Honorary Colonels ===
From 1971 to 1972, the companies of the regiment each maintained a Deputy Honorary Colonel, in succession to the previous battalions.

- B Company: Lieutenant-Colonel Alexander W.R.H. Pettigrew, OBE, TD
