= Home Service (disambiguation) =

Home Service may refer to:

- Home Service, a British folk band
- BBC Home Service, a former radio station in the United Kingdom
- Home Service Force, a former British Army formation
- Military service in a British Army unit permanently stationed in Northern Ireland (see Royal Irish Regiment (1992)#Northern Ireland Resident Battalions (Home Service))
