= Worcestershire Rifles =

7th Battalion, Worcestershire Regiment Worcestershire Rifles
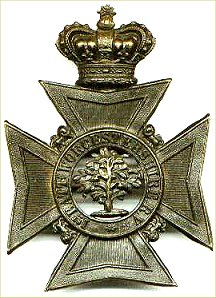
- Cap badge of the Worcestershire Rifles before joining the Worcestershire Regiment
- Active: 1859–1919; 1920–1947; 1947–present
- Country: United Kingdom
- Branch: Volunteer Force, Territorial Force, Territorial Army, Army Reserve
- Type: Infantry, Anti-tank
- Size: 3 battalions (peak)
- Part of: Worcestershire Regiment
- Garrison/HQ: Kidderminster
- Engagements: Boer War; First World War; Western Front; Battle of the Somme; Operations on the Ancre; Battle of Passchendaele; Italian Front; Second World War; Defence of France; Burma Campaign; Battle of Imphal; Battle of Kohima

The Worcestershire Rifles (Worcs Rifles) was a volunteer, part-time unit of the British Army based in the county of Worcestershire that had a long, yet split history in two units before merging into the larger Worcestershire Regiment. Following active service in World War I, during which its strength was tripled to three battalions, and World War II, in which its strength was doubled to two battalions, the unit was reduced to a company, and later expanded to two companies. Following reductions in the early 21st century, the two companies were merged and later reduced to a platoon in 2006. Today, the regiment's lineage is continued in the anti-tank platoon of the 4th Battalion, Mercian Regiment, still based in Kidderminster where the first volunteers had formed.

== Volunteer Force ==
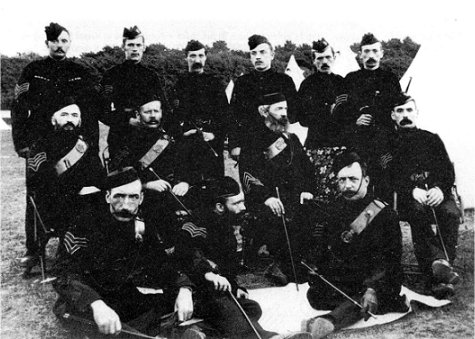
Group of 1st Worcestershire Rifles NCOs

=== Background ===
Following Napoleon III's coup and successful take over of France in 1851, a French threat of invasion loomed over the United Kingdom. With this threat, company sized Rifle Volunteer Corps (RVCs) units were formed across the country. On 1 July 1859, the British government announced that it would issue 25 Long Enfield Rifles per 100 volunteers, on the condition that the corps provided safe ranges, secured the weapons, set approved rules, and made themselves subject to periodic military inspection. On 4 May 1859, the Worcestershire (Worcs) Rifles were formed. Just two years into the unit's history, the many RVCs, which became increasingly difficult to administer, were grouped into 'Administrative Battalions'. Thus, the 1st Battalion, Worcestershire Volunteer Rifles or the 1st Administrative Battalion, Worcestershire Volunteers was formed later that year. The battalion's initial organisation on formation was as follows, and it was intended that each RVC had 100 men.

- Battalion Headquarters, in Hagley
- 1st (Worcestershire Rifles) RVC, in Wolverley
- 2nd (Tenbury) RVC, at Berrington Road drill hall, Tenbury Wells
- 3rd (Kidderminster) RVC, at The Shrubbery, Kidderminster – many of these men were employed in the production of carpets
- 4th (2nd Kidderminster) RVC, at The Shrubbery, Kidderminster
- 5th (Bewdley) RVC, at Load Street drill hall, Bewdley
- 6th (Halesowen) RVC, in Grammar School Lane drill hall, Halesowen
- 7th (Dudley) RVC, at Wolverhampton Street drill hall, Dudley
- 8th (Stourport) RVC, at Lion Hill drill hall, Stourport-on-Severn
- 9th (Stourbridge) RVC, at Bell Street drill hall, Stourbridge
- 16th (Oldbury) RVC, in Oldbury – many were employed in the several iron foundries and construction of railway carriages
- 20th (Kidderminster) RVC, at The Shrubbery, Kidderminster

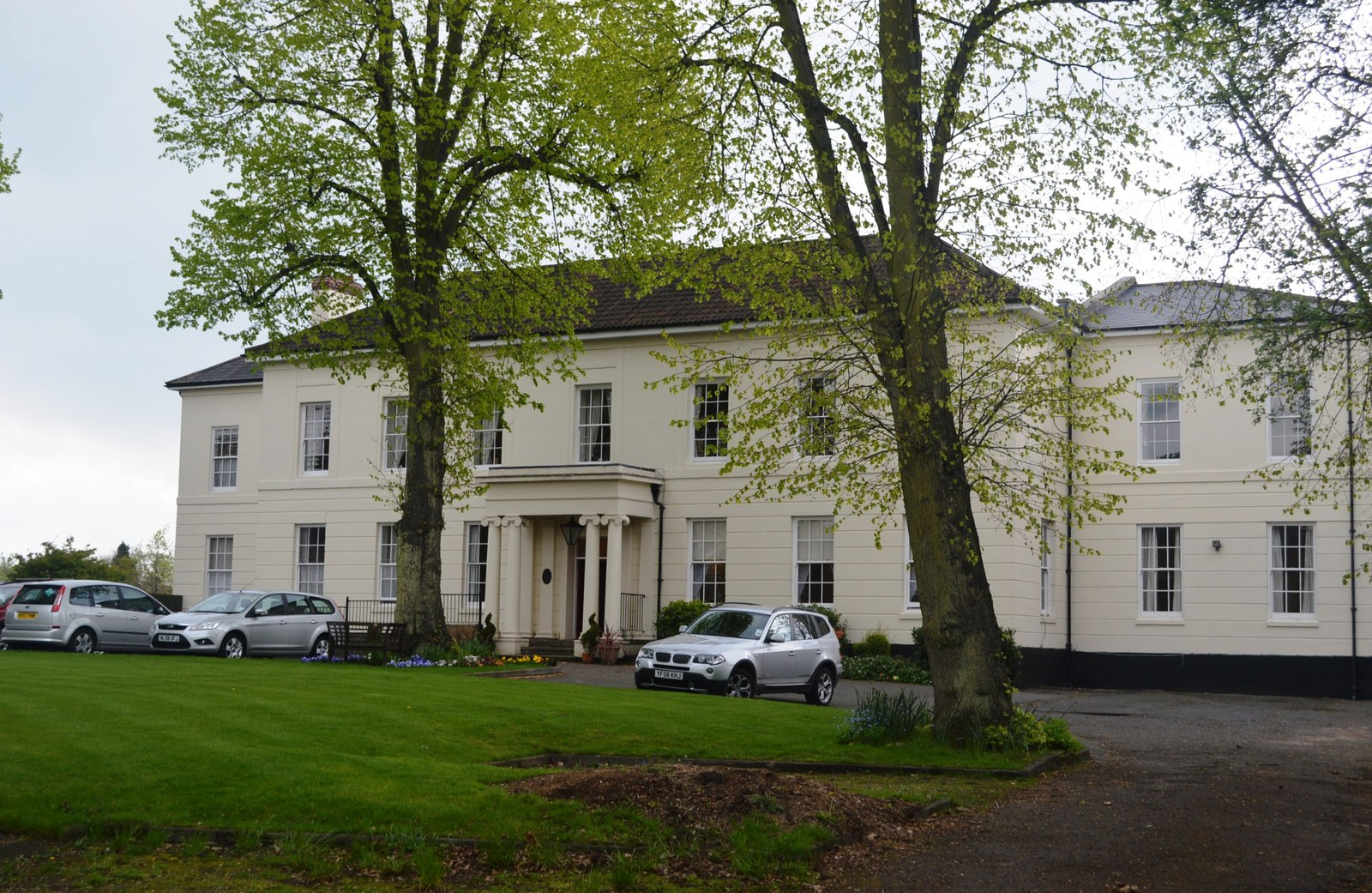
The Shrubbery, Kidderminster, headquarters of the battalion until 1994 when the (then company) was removed.

In 1863, the Volunteer Act 1863 (26 & 27 Vict. c. 65) was passed, which required the volunteers to be mobilised in the event of an invasion. In 1872, under the provisions of the Regulation of the Forces Act 1871, jurisdiction over the volunteers was removed from the county lord-lieutenants and placed under the Secretary of State for War. This started the process of integrating the volunteer units into the British Army. On 16 March 1880, the corps was consolidated into a single battalion and the individual titles were removed. The formation then became the 1st Worcestershire Rifle Volunteers. The above RVCs were re-designated as 'companies', lettered A-L and remained based at their former locations.

=== 1st Volunteer Battalion ===
On 1 May 1881, General Order 41/1881 (41st order of 1881) was issued to the Army, signed under the name of the Secretary of State for War, and becoming known as the Childers Reforms. These wide-ranging reforms would seed the creation of the modern British Army with the disestablishment of the old-style numbered regiments, and creation of new county regiments. Among the changes was the union of the 29th (Worcestershire) Regiment of Foot and 36th (Herefordshire) Regiment of Foot, creating the 1st and 2nd Battalions of the new Worcestershire Regiment (Worcs), the county regiment of both Worcestershire and Herefordshire (at least initially). Along with the regular changes, the county RVs were merged into the new regiments creating new 'Volunteer Battalions'. The 1st Worcestershire RVs therefore became a volunteer battalion of the new regiment on 1 July 1881. In 1882, a new 'M Company' was formed in Dudley.

Following a supplement to the original reforms, in June 1883, the RVs in the Worcs became the 1st Volunteer Battalion, Worcestershire Regiment; however, the Worcs' uniform was not adopted, and the old style uniforms were retained. Between 1885 and 1886, the battalion's headquarters moved to Stourbridge.

In 1891, headquarters moved to Kidderminster, and A Company followed shortly thereafter. During the South African War, the battalion sent volunteers to serve alongside the regular 1st and 2nd battalions. For their efforts, the battalion was granted its first battle honour; "South Africa 1900–1901".

== Territorial Force ==
Under the army reforms introduced by Secretary of State for War Richard Haldane in 1907, the existing auxiliary forces (the Imperial Yeomanry and Volunteer Forces) were to be combined (with effect from 1 April 1908) as a new organisation to be known as the Territorial Force (TF). In his 'Territorial and Reserve Forces Bill', Mr Haldane set up an establishment of fourteen divisions (infantry), fourteen mounted brigades (yeomanry), army troops, and troops for coastal defence. These to be raised and administered locally by a number of Territorial Force Associations. Under these reforms, the structure of infantry units were also altered, with each containing a peace establishment of 1,009 of all ranks in 8 companies 'A' to 'H', all under command of a Lieutenant-Colonel.

Therefore, on 1 April 1908, the battalion became the 7th Battalion, Worcestershire Regiment, falling in line after the 2 battalions of the former Worcestershire Militia and four regular battalions. The new battalion was organised into the following new organisation:

- Battalion Headquarters, at The Shrubbery Kidderminster
- A Company, at The Shrubbery Kidderminster
- B Company, at Berrington Road drill hall, Tenbury Wells (from 1912 Teme Street drill hall)
  - Half-Company, at The Shrubbery Kidderminster
  - Detachment, in Bockleton
- C Company, at Lion Hill drill hall, Stourport-on-Severn – new drill hall at same location erected in 1911
  - Half-Company, at the George Hotel, Bewdley
- D Company, in Lion Hill drill hall, Stourport-on-Severn – new drill hall at same location erected in 1911
  - Half-Company, in Kinver
- E Company, in Oldbury
- F Company, at Grammar School Lane drill hall, Halesowen
- G and H Companies, at Wolverhampton drill hall, Dudley

Under the reforms, each TF battalion was assigned to a higher formation, whereby the 7th Worcs joined the Gloucester and Worcester Brigade, South Midland Division.

== First World War ==
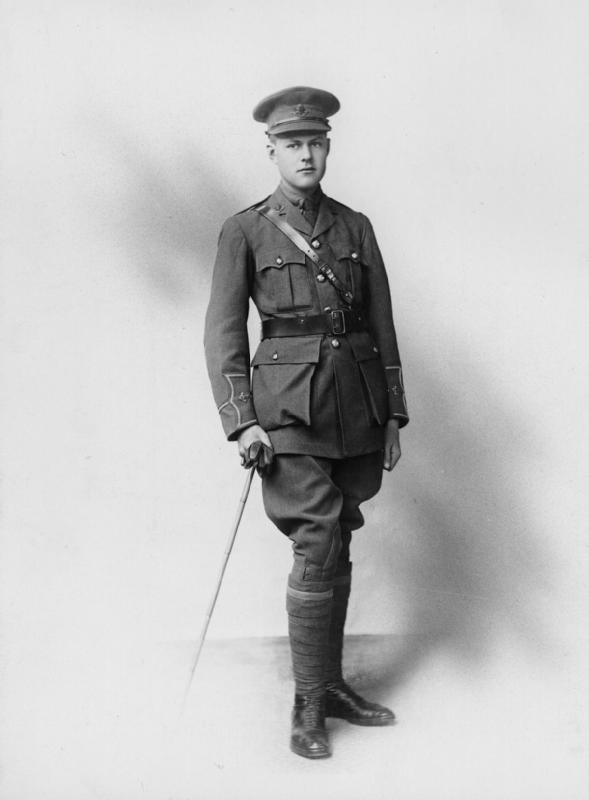
Lieutenant John Arden Acworth of the 7th Worcs joined 26 April 1917 and took part in the Battle of Passchendaele, where he died on 13 October 1917.

Under the conditions of the Territorial and Reserve Forces Act 1907, members, if embodied, were liable for service anywhere in the United Kingdom, but they could not be ordered to go overseas. Officers and men of the peacetime TF could also offer to serve outside the United Kingdom in time of national emergency. Under the conditions set out for the Imperial Service Section, a territorial could undertake to serve abroad, but only with his own unit, or with part of his own unit: he could not be drafted as an individual to any other unit except at his own request.

After the outbreak of war, units of the TF were invited to volunteer for Overseas Service. On 15 August 1914, the War Office issued instructions to separate those men who had signed up for Home Service only, and form these into reserve units. On 31 August, the formation of a reserve or 2nd Line unit was authorised for each 1st Line unit where 60 per cent or more of the men had volunteered for Overseas Service. The titles of these 2nd Line units would be the same as the original, but distinguished by a '2/' prefix. In this way duplicate battalions, brigades and divisions were created, mirroring those TF formations being sent overseas, and absorbing the large numbers of volunteers coming forward. Later the 2nd Line TF battalions were raised to full strength ready to go overseas, and began to form Reserve (3rd Line) units to supply reinforcement drafts.

=== 1/7th Battalion ===
==== Mobilisation ====
As the international situation deteriorated in July and August 1914, the South Midland Division was on their annual summer exercise and quickly mobilised. On 4 August 1914 the battalion was embodied in Kidderminster and immediately moved to Chelmsford with the South Midland Division, undertaking training and home defence. On formation of the new 2/7th Battalion on 21 September 1914, the original 7th Bn was redesignated as the 1/7th Battalion, and the brigade entitled as 1st Gloucester and Worcester Brigade in the 1st South Midland Division.

==== France ====
In September 1914, the battalion moved to Swindon, and from there to Maldon. Finally, on 22 March 1915, the South Midland Division crossed to France. They then arrived in Cassel and began digging trenches and took up positions in defence of the city. On 13 May 1915, in an effort to standardise the TF, the 1st Gloucester and Worcester Brigade became the 144th Infantry Brigade, and South Midland Division became 48th (South Midland) Division.

===== The Somme =====
Map of the Battle of the Somme, the X Corps area can be seen in the centre-upper-right area near the village of Hamel.

On 1 July 1916, the division was moved south to the area around Auchonvillers, near the River Somme, the 'Mailly-Maillet sector'. Here the British Fourth and French 6th Armies attacked on a large front between Gommecourt to the north of Albert and Faucoucourt to the south. The attacks to the south of Albert to Bapaume were very successful, inflicting a considerable defeat to the Germany 2nd Army. However, north the Albert-Bapaume road, the British attack was a catastrophe and constituted most of the 60,000 casualties on the first day of the battle. The British VIII Corps were on the left of Fourth Army, with their area of attack around the villages of Serre and Beaumont-Hamel. 48th (South Midland) Division were in the 'Divisional Reserve' near Meilly-sur-Rouvres and Meillet during the initial attack.

On 15 July 1916, the battalion was in the area of Ovillers-la-Boisselle and attack German position that afternoon, which marked the beginning of the second phase of the Battle of the Somme; in contrast to the disaster of the first day of the Somme it turned out to be hugely successful for the British. By this time, the 48th Division was part of X Corps in the Reserve Army, and held the village of Ovillers. Following a failed attack from the Warwickshire Brigade (143rd), another attack was ordered on 15 July but here enemy fire wiped out the leading troops, before the attack was called off and the survivors relieved. However, the 144th Brigade continued the offensive with the 1/4th (City of Bristol) Gloucesters and 1/7th Worcs gaining positions in and around Ovillers. The 1/7th Worcs gained a defensive position in the ruined church being directly above abandoned German dug outs, still intact in the church vaults. During the evening of 15 July, the 143rd and 144th Brigades were sent forward again to relieve the 32nd Division and continue the attack.

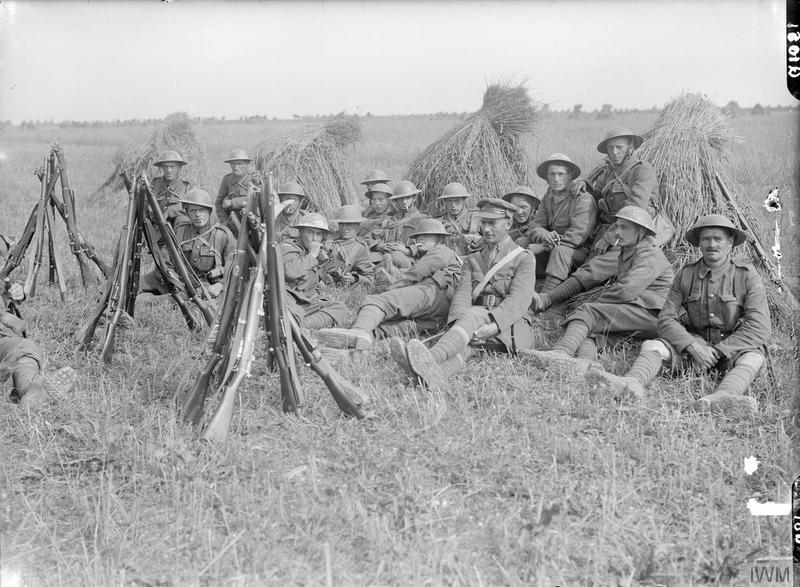
Lieutenant Baxter's Platoon, C Company, 1/7th Battalion, Worcestershire Regiment, resting in a cornfield near Lavieville, September 1916.

By 17 July, at the opening of the Battle of Bezentin Ridge, the village of Ovillers-la-Boisselle had been attacked by troops of the 25th Division and 32nd Division with units of the 48th Division in support. Following the capture of the village by the 5th Warwicks at 18:00pm, the 144th Brigade was sent into the area, and proceeded to clear the trenches around the village with the 1/4th (City of Bristol) Gloucesters stating a night attack to the north. At 00:30 am on 23 July, the British Fourth Army, assisted by units of the Reserve Army and I Anzac Corps staged a major attack on Pozieres and the O. G. Lines. On the left of the Australians, the 48th Division, still part of X Corps, attacked west from Ovillers-la-Boisselle towards the O. G. Lines north of Pozieres. The attack achieved some success, but at a considerable cost in casualties. During these attacked, the 48th Division suffered 2,844 casualties.

By 13 August 1916, the 48th Division was moved into II Corps in the Reserve Army, and returned to the front to continue their attacks around Ovillers-la-Boisselle and the Neb Valley, north of Authuille Wood. Operations were also carried out against the German strong point of the Leipzig Redoubt and Skyline Trench near Ovillers, the battalions altering with each other as they moved into and out of the line. During this period, the 48th Division suffered 2,505 casualties. As a necessary preliminary to Haig's projected autumn offensive, the Reserve Army was required to secure the Thiepval Ridge and the upper Ancre. Attempts on the positions were initially made on 1 October, but due to heavy residence and bad weather, the positions were not fully secured until 10 November. On 13 November, another attack was organised in the area of Le Sars, however the 48th Division were in the trenches around the town and not directly involved in the attack.

The battalion suffered 107 men killed during the battle.

===== Hindenburg Line =====
The 48th Division was in III Corps in the Fourth Army, in the sector of the front line outside La Meisonnette and Bieches, on the west bank of the River Somme near Péronne, when the German retreat began with the division following suite. The brigade suffered casualties from heavy howitzer fire outside Épehy on 31 March before they and the 143rd Brigade captured it in an early morning attack the following day; 6th Warwicks on the Left and 7th Worcs in the centre, while the 6th Gloucesters were on the right.

Following the successful occupation of Peronne, the 48th Division faced very little resistance on 16 March, and crossed the River Somme south-west of Heilles, before capturing Mont Saint-Quentin and advancing into Péronne from the north at 07:00 on 18 March.

===== Third Battle of Ypres =====
On 16 August 1917, the Third Battle of Ypres was launched through a massed British attack, with the 48th Division being part of XVIII Corps now part of Fifth Army, with their objectives: the village of Saint Julien and the several strong points around it. The attack was led by the 144th Brigade on the left, with the 143rd Brigade on the right, and the 145th Brigade in support. Once the initial objectives had been secured, the entire division continued to secure the final objectives. The men were supposed to advance behind a protective artillery and smoke barrage, but due to the heavy ground, particularly around the Henebeek stream, was lost, which left them open to heavy machine-gun and rifle fire, along with the retaliatory German barrage. Despite this slow progress, the division did make significant progress. The 143rd Brigade, assisted by the 145th Brigade capture Saint Julien, and the 144th Brigade cleared a number of strong points, including Border House and Gun Pit.

On 25 September, a German counter-attack around Polygon Wood had recaptured some of the ground lost during the Battle of the Menin Road. The following day, the Allied advance resumed on a front extending from the Menin Road to Saint Julien, and centered on Polygon Wood, to remove them and then continue to move east. In the north of the battle area, the 48th Div, still part of XVIII Corps held the area around Saint Julien which they had captured during the Battle of Langemarck.

By 9 October, the 48th Division were in the positions, north-east of Saint Julien, which were in Battle of Broodseinde. The 144th Brigade leading the attack, with their initial objectives being the strong points of Adler Farm, Inch House, and Oxford House, before pushing on through the Wallemolen. Attacking with the 1/7th Worcs, 1/4th Gloucesters, and 1/6th Gloucesters all in the front line, 8th Worcs in support, the attack was a disaster before it had even set off, with some units taking 14 hours just to reach their jumping off points. Struggling exhausted through the heavy ground, the troops soon lost their artillery barrage, and came under heavy machine-gun fire from the heavily entrenched soldiers of the 16th German Division. On the right, Alder Farm was captured, but elsewhere the attack stalled, gaining little ground at the cost of 800 casualties.

==== Italy ====
On 10 November 1917, the 48th Division was informed that they would be moved to Italy, with entrainment beginning on 21 November, and by 1 December detrainment was completed around Legnago (on the Adige). On 2 December, the 48th Division began moving northwards into the XI Corps area. On 1 March 1917, the division completed the relief of 7th Division in the XIV Corps sector of the Piave Front, around Montello, and held the line until relieved on 16 March. On 1 April, the division moved westwards, into reserve for the middle sector of the Asiago Front.

By 15 June 1918, the 144th Brigade was in the reserve providing support to the 143rd and 145th Brigades in the front-line trenches near Perghele. Following an artillery bombardment, which the 48th Divisional Artillery was unable to reply to as its telephone lines had been cut, units of the 6th Austro-Hungarian Division attacked the trenches, quickly gaining ground in several places. The 5th Gloucesters and 5th Royal Warwicks were both overrun and pushed back several hundred yards. All the lost ground was retaken in a counter-attack by the 144th Brigade that evening. By 4 November, the 48th Division was stationed in the front-line trenches outside Cesune on the Asiago Plateau, they were to the west of the battle area and were not intended to take part in the assault. However, when a trench raid by the 1st Buckinghamshire Battalion, Oxford and Bucks LI on the sec found the trenches there empty, orders were given to gain touch with the enemy in their new position. Patrols were sent out to find them, 4th Oxford and Bucks LI finding Asiago evacuated, whilst 7th Worcestershires advanced two miles in the dark before coming across resistance near Camporovere.

On 11 November, with news coming through that the Austro-Hungarian Army was in full retreat further east, 48th Division was ordered to join the advance. They attacked the line from north of Camporovere to Monte Catz with the 144th Brigade on the left and the 145th Brigade on the right. Later that day, news of the Armistice came and the entire Allied Force held position, and the war was over. In March 1919, the battalion left Italy for France, and on 31 March returned to England, where on 4 April 1919 was disembodied.

During the battalion's service in Italy, five battle honours were awarded, including one campaign honour, they included; "Asiago", "Piave", "Vittoria Veneto", "Asiago Plateau", and finally "Italy 1917–18", which was emblazoned on the regimental colours.

==== Commanding Officers ====
The following officers commanded the battalion throughout the war:

- 4 August 1914 – 7 November 1914: Lieutenant-Colonel John Walter Garratt
- 7 November 1914 – 2 December 1916: Lieutenant-Colonel Alexander Ramsay Harman
- 2 December 1916 – 4 April 1919: Lieutenant-Colonel Francis Martin Tomkinson

=== 2/7th Battalion ===
After the ready, able, and willing men of the 7th Bn moved to 1/7th Worcs, the 2/7th Battalion was formed on 21 September 1914 in Worcester and placed under 2nd Gloucester and Worcester Brigade, now part of the 2nd South Midland Division.

==== Home Service ====
By 1 April 1915, the 2nd South Midland Division, now designated as 61st (2nd South Midland) Division, which formed part of the First Army, Central Force. However, in April 1915, after the departure of the 1st South Midland Division to France, the 61st Division moved to Chelmsford where it took over responsibility for 14 miles of coastal defence of Essex. In February 1916, the division moved to Salisbury Plain, following which it began intensive preparations for war and training.

The move to the Salisbury Plain was completed in March, and intensive preparations now began, among other moves being that Lewis guns replaced wooden dummy guns and antique Maxim guns of the machine-gun sections. On 29 April 1915, just before their move to France, the battalion was reorganised so that the Home Service-only men were transferred out to the newly formed 3/7th Battalion. On 5 May the division concentrated in the Tidworth-Bulford area to be reviewed by HM King George V, and on 21 May began its entrainment for France.

==== France ====
By 28 May, the 61st Division had concentrated in the XI Corps rest area, in Merville-Gonnehem-Busnes-Thiennes, where on 31 May it was joined by the divisional ammunition column.

===== Attack on Fromelles =====
By 19 July 1916, the 61st Division had been in the trenches with little to no-action, by this point the division had move east and attacked the area around Fromelles. In July 1916, the Fourth Army was attacking on the Somme, while First and Second Armies were ordered to prepare diversionary attacks in their sectors of the front line to exploit any possible weakening of the German defences there. The attack of First Army was conducted by XI Corps with 61st Division and 5th Australian Division, both of which had only recently arrived on the Western Front, and for whom this would be their first major action. The area they were to attack was held by the 6th Bavarian Reserve Division and covered by German artillery on Aubers Ridge.

With the inexperienced troops attacking in daylight against an experienced, well-set enemy, who outnumbered them two to one, the attack was a disaster. The Australians suffered the most, losing over 5,500 men out of the total 7,000 casualties. 61st Div, on the right of the Australians, were east of the Pétillon to Feuquissert road and north-west of Fromelles, attacking between a German strong-point known as the Sugar Loaf, near Le Trou, and south of Fauquissart. The 184th Brigade on the left, while the 183rd Brigade was in the centre with 2/4th and 2/6th Gloucesters being the lead battalions, while the 182nd Brigade was on the left. The preceding artillery barrage having little effect on the German positions, the front line battalions were swept by machine-gun fire as they attempted to leave their lines, only on the extreme right did a part of 2/7th R Warwicks make it past the German front line, where they were isolated and surrounded by a German counter-attack. 61st Division suffered 1,547 casualties at Fromelles.

===== Operations on the Ancre =====
Although weather and ground conditions had forced a halt to the British advance on the Somme on 19 November 1916, they did not cease all operations there, particularly in the area occupied by the British Fifth Army north of the River Ancre. 61st Div, now in IV Corps took over a sector of the line near Saint Pierre Division and Grandcourt in November 1916. 61st Division held the area until they were relieved by 18th (Eastern) Division on 15 January 1917.

===== Retreat to the Hindenburg Line =====
Following the mass retreat of German Armed Forces to the Hindenburg Line, 61st Division were in positions east of Rosières-en-Santerre when the German retreat began. Following behind them the division crossed the River Somme around Brie-Comte-Robert (Brie). Reaching Caulaincourt and Vermand on 31 March, the 183rd Brigade and the 184th Brigade attacked a German position north-east of Soyécourt on 2 April, and the 183rd Brigade near Fresnoy-le-Petit during the night of 5 April.

===== Third Battle of Ypres =====
61st Division was in XIX Corps, until noon on 7 September, and then V Corps, move from reserve to the Saint Julien Sector on 18 August, in support to the XIX Corps attack. On 18 August, 61st Division in XIX Corps moved to support lines near Wieltje on 16 August. The 183rd Brigade taking over a sector of the front line south of Saint Julien during the night of 17–18 August.

On 20 August, 2/8th Worcs attacked a German pillbox near Somme Farm, the division participated in further major attacks on 22 August, 27 August, and finally 15 September. 2/7th Worcs attempted to raid German positions during the evening of 24 August. The 183rd Brigade attacked towards Gallipoli Farm and Aisne Farm on 27 August, struggling through the mud they lost the artillery barrage and were forced back without success and incurred heavy casualties. The 182nd Brigade relieving the 183rd Brigade during the night of 30–31 August, the brigade made several attempts to capture Hill 35 between 1–5 September.

61st Division had arrived in the Cambrai area on 30 November to assist in the defence against the German counter-attacks. Concentrating west of Havrincourt Wood, during the afternoon of 1 December they were assigned to III Corps and moved forward to relieve the survivors of three divisions: Guards Division, 12th (Eastern) Division, and 20th (Light) Division holding the village of La Vacquerie on Welsh Ridge. The 182nd and the 183rd Brigades took over the front line, the 184th Brigade forming a reserve. Holding the position until forced out of the village on 4 December, the division was relieved by 36th (Ulster) Division on 5 December, having suffered 1,916 casualties during its time at Cambrai.

2/7th Worcs then remained in the area, but because of their depleted numbers, they were moved into the rear near Germaine, Marne, and finally on 20 February 1918 was disbanded with personnel going to the 2/8th and 10th (Service) Battalions.

==== Commanding Officers ====
The following officers commanded the battalion throughout the war:

- 23 September 1914 – 20 August 1915: Lt Col Edward Vincent Vashon Wheeler (replaced)
- 20 August 1915 – 21 April 1916: Colonel Algernon George Peyton (replaced)
- 21 April 1916 – 17 October 1917: Lt Col Claud Dorman (wounded)
- 17 October 1917 – 29 October 1917: Captain Alfred Vernon Rowe (replaced)
- 29 October 1917 – 12 December 1917: Lt Col Percy Balfour (KIA/DOW)
- 12 December 1917 – 6 February 1918: Lt Col Arthur Bertram Lawson (transferred to another active bn)
- 6 February 1918 – 20 February 1918: Lt Col Harry Adshead

=== 3/7th Battalion ===
The 3/7th Battalion was formed on 29 April 1915 from home service-only personnel of the 2/7th Bn at Worcester. Shortly after formation the battalion moved to Weston-super-Mare. On 8 April 1916, just a year after formation the 3/7th Worcs moved to the Salisbury Plain and became 7th (Reserve) Battalion, and subsequently absorbed the 8th (Reserve) Bn on 1 September 1916. In October 1916, the battalion moved to Cheltenham and then shortly thereafter moved to Catterick. In Summer 1917 3/7th Worcs moved to Blyth, and then into Newcastle upon Tyne in 1918 and was transferred to the South Midland Reserve Brigade part of the Territorial Reserve. Finally, on 22 April 1919, the battalion was disbanded at Catterick.

==== Commanding Officers ====
The following officers commanded the battalion throughout the war:

- 15 April 1915 – 13 June 1916: Major William John Thompson (replaced)
- 14 June 1916 – 31 August 1916: Lt Col Charles William Thomas (replaced)
- 16 September 1916 – 22 April 1919: Lt Col Edgar Jessopp Christie

== Interwar ==
Following a brief period of disembodiment, the 7th Battalion was reformed on 7 February 1920. Its headquarters was based at The Shrubbery, Kidderminster. The battalion had an infantry company based in Kidderminster, Tenbury Wells, Stourport-on-Severn, and Dudley.

== Second World War ==
During this period, all infantry battalions were organised along the following structure:

- Battalion Headquarters
- Headquarters Company (Note: On mobilisation a number of the specialist platoons would be moved to the 'Support Company.)
  - Headquarters (1 x Truck)
  - No. 6 Administration Platoon (12 x Lorries, 8 x Trucks)
  - No. 1 Signal Platoon (2 x Trucks)
- A Company (B–D Companies the same organisation, platoons go up in numbers by company)
  - Company Headquarters (5 x Motorcycles, 2 x Trucks)
  - No. 1–3 Platoons (each of 3 x LMGs, 1 x Anti-Tank Rifle, 1 x 2-inch mortar)
- B–D Companies
- Support Company (Note: Formed on mobilisation, controlling the specialist platoons, however during peacetime these all reside under HQ Company)>
  - No. 3 Mortar Platoon (2 x ML 3-inch mortars)
  - No. 2 Anti-Aircraft Platoon (4 x LMGs)
  - No. 4 Carrier Platoon (10 x Carriers, 10 x LMGs)
  - No. 5 Pioneer Platoon – provided by the battalion Corps of Drums
  - No. 7 Anti-Tank Platoon (10 x Anti-Tank Rifles) – formed on mobilisation

By 1942, the Anti-Tank platoon was reorganised so that it contained 12 universal carriers and eight towed 2-pdr anti-tank guns. By June 1944, this organisation had further been refined to include twelve universal carriers, one Lloyd Carrier, six two-inch mortars, six light machine-guns, and six 6-pdr anti-tank guns. The mortar platoon had also reorganised to contain three trucks, seven universal carriers, six 3-inch mortars, and three PIAT anti-tank weapons.

=== 7th Battalion ===
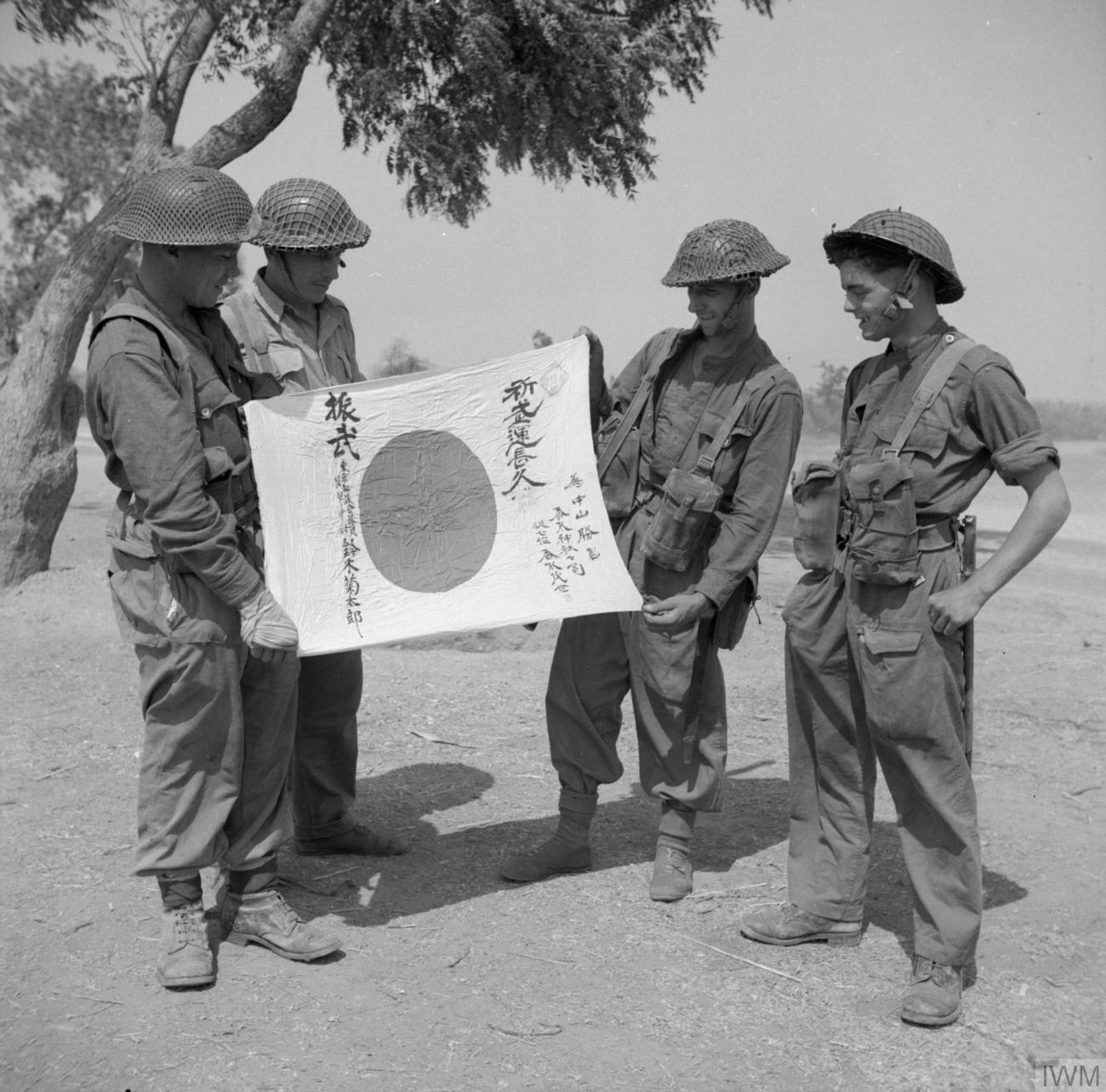
Men of the 7th Worcester Regiment display a Japanese flag captured on Mount Popa, 16 April 1945.

The 7th Battalion was part of the Territorial Army, and was assigned to the 114th Infantry Brigade of the 48th (South Midland) Infantry Division. On 14 January 1940, the battalion embarked from the Port of Southampton on the SS Amsterdam, and arrived in Le Havre, France two days later. On 5 February 1940, the battalion joined the 5th Infantry Brigade, which was part of the 2nd Infantry Division. This was part of the effort to mix regular and territorial troops within divisions. After the German invasion of Belgium, the battalion advance into Belgium with the 2nd Division. After a strategic reversal, the force withdrew back into France. By 23 May, the 2nd Infantry Division was in the area of Saint-Venant-Robecq-La Bassée where, until the 29th, it was engaged in heavy combat. The battalion was engaged in heavy fighting to defend the La Bassée canal line that the division occupied. On 30 May, the remnants of the battalion and the brigade were evacuated via Dunkirk and returned to the United Kingdom. During the retreat, the battalion's band lost their equipment. A French villager took the equipment and hid them. It was returned to British possession when the area was liberated in 1944. At the start of the Battle of France, the battalion was over 700 strong but left Dunkirk with 366 men.

Once back in the United Kingdom, the battalion was assigned to defend the Yorkshire area along with the 2nd Division. The battalion was rebuilt over the coming months. On 15 April, the division departed the United Kingdom with the intention of reinforcing the Eighth Army in the North African Western Desert. However, in May, the convoy was ordered to sail for British India because of increasing civil tension there and arrived in July 1942. As part of the division, the battalion formed part of the British strategic reserve in Asia, and spent 1942 through 1944 in training and unable to be deployed. Because of the logistical issues at the time, the division could not be employed in Burma to fight against Japan.

In March 1944, Japan invaded India, and then besieged Imphal and Kohima, and the 2nd Infantry Division was deployed to launch a counterattack. On 11 April, two companies of 7th Battalion became the vanguard of the 5th Brigade. On the night of 13/14 April, infiltrating Japanese troops were engaged by the battalion and forced to retreat. On 18 April, the division broke through to relieve Kohima. The battalion and the 5th Brigade were next engaged in an effort to take the village of Naga, on the evening of 25 April in heavy rain. The action continued for several days, until the battalion was relieved on 3 May. By 24 May, the division had succeeded in driving the Japanese off Kohima Ridge. The division then pushed towards Imphal, and ended that siege. The battalion remained in the area until 8 August.

The division then advanced into Burma, and reached an area north of Mandalay by the end of 1944. The battalion, as part of the 2nd Division, took part in the Battle of Meiktila and Mandalay during the opening months of 1945. On 24 February, elements of the battalion attempted a crossing of the Irrawaddy River, but their crossing had to be abandoned. Other crossings secured a bridgehead for the division, which crossed in full by 27 February. The battalion then fought its last action of the Burma campaign in April, when it helped clear Mount Popa. The division was then withdrawn to India. It was intended that the division would be used in Operation Dracula, to land at the Burmese port of Rangoon. However, the operation was called off after the port was occupied by other British forces that had advanced through Burma. It was then intended that the division, which still included the battalion, would be used for Operation Zipper, a planned amphibious landing in Malaya that aimed to liberate Singapore. However, the surrender of Japan forestalled this endeavour. The battalion remained in India, and in January 1947 was placed in suspended animation, with the residue forming the 107th Battalion. That battalion was disbanded on 10 March 1947.

=== 9th Battalion ===
As part of the effort to expand the British armed forces, the Territorial Army was ordered to form new formations. Existing first-line formations would create new units, a process known as duplicating. The 8th Battalion formed the 9th Battalion as their duplicate, with the first officers being commissioned in the battalion on 17 May 1939. The battalion formed part of the 182nd Infantry Brigade, which eventually became part of the 61st Infantry Division. The division remained in England until June 1940, when it was deployed to defend Northern Ireland. It remained until February 1943, when it returned to England. As part of the division, the battalion prepared to deploy to Burma in mid-1945. However, the end of the war against Japan halted such a move. On 31 December 1945, the battalion was placed into suspended animation.

== Cold War ==
On 1 April 1947, the TA was reformed. Both the 7th and 9th Battalions were formed, but were subsequently merged as the 7th Battalion based in Kidderminster. The battalion formed part of the 159th (Welsh Border) Infantry Brigade, 53rd (Welsh) Infantry Division.

The new battalion was organised as follows:

- Battalion Headquarters, in Kidderminster
- Headquarters Company, in Kidderminster
- A Company, in Dudley
- B Company, in Stourbridge
- C Company, in Oldbury
- D Company, in Halesowen

In 1967, the battalion was disbanded. Its lineage was taken over by the newly formed B (Worcestershire) Company, part of the Mercian Volunteers, and was based in Kidderminster. Some of the battalion's personnel also joined the Worcestershire Territorial Regiment, Royal Artillery. On 1 January 1969, B Company formed a platoon in Worcester from personnel from P Battery, Worcestershire Territorial Regiment, Royal Artillery, when that regiment was reduced. On 20 April 1970, the latter was redesignated as the Worcestershire Regiment (TAVR), perpetuating the infantry element of the unit.

Following a brief period as a cadre, the TAVR regiment was reformed as a company, becoming A (Worcestershire) Company within the Light Infantry and Mercian Volunteers, based in Worcester. In 1975, B Company transferred to 1st Battalion, Mercian Volunteers, and A Company transferred to the 2nd Battalion, Mercian Volunteers with a new platoon based in Stourport-on-Severn. Following an expansion of the Territorial Army in 1988, the 4th (Volunteer) Battalion, Worcestershire and Sherwood Foresters was formed at Kohima House, Redditch, and also had a platoon based in Droiwitch.

In 1992, following the Dissolution of the Soviet Union, the British Government announced the Options for Change, which reduced the size of the army by 30 percent. As part of these reductions, the 4th Worcestershire Battalion was disbanded, with A Company merging with B Company, to form the new A (Worcestershire) Company, part of the 5th (Shropshire and Herefordshire) Battalion, The Light Infantry, and based in Kidderminster. The new company retained the regimental colours, uniforms, and dress of the 4th Worcesters. On 26 February 1993, the company was redesignated as A (Worcestershire and Sherwood Foresters) Company.

== Modern day ==
In 1999, further reductions were made to the Territorial Army as part of the 1998 Strategic Defence Review. The company became B (Worcestershire and Sherwood Foresters) Company, and continued to be based in Kidderminster although it had an assault pioneer platoon based in Worcester. The company became part of the West Midlands Regiment as a result of the review during this period. In 2006, under the Future Army Structure programme, the company was reduced to just the assault pioneer platoon which was now based in Kidderminster, and was placed under the D (Staffordshire) Company of the West Midlands Regiment. Under the Army 2020 and later Army 2020 Refine programmes, the platoon was reorganised as an anti-tank platoon under the headquarters company, still based at The Shrubbery in Kidderminster; where the original volunteers had formed.

== Uniform ==
The uniform of the Worcestershire Rifles was hareback grey with maroon braiding trimming. The colour braiding was peculiar to the 1st Administrative Battalion. In the Army List for 1876, the first to give details on volunteer uniforms, the battalion was shown in green, with crimson facings. In the regimental museum, there is a tunic with these facings. This is the only rifle uniform, in the British Army, to have crimson facings. However, in 1877, the facings were changed to green. In 1904, facings were changed to black. Following the battalion's integration into the Worcestershire Regiment, in 1908, the uniform was changed to a scarlet uniform with white facings to match the rest of the regiment. Per the May 1921 monthly army list, the battalion's facings had reverted to green.

Following the volunteers' integration into the Worcestershire Regiment, the Territorial Force battalions wore the same badge as the regulars, but in white metal compared to the bronze worn by the regulars. Prior to this, the volunteers badge had been the Pear Tree of Worcester, associated with the Archers of Worcestershire at Crécy and Poitiers.

== Honorary Colonels ==
Honorary colonels of the regiment included:

- 2 March 1898–on or before 9 June 1922 (his death): Charles George Lyttelton, 8th Viscount Cobham MP
- 10 July 1929–September 1939/October 1939: Francis Martin Tomkinson, DSO, TD (Battalion Colonel in the TA Reserve – former commanding officer) – transferred to 1st Bn and served throughout the war
- –31 March 1967: Lt Col (Honorary Col) H. J. C. Lattey, TD, DL
- 1967–1971: Lt Col Alexander William Raymond Hartley Pettigrew, OBE, TD (re-appointed 1 April 1972)
