= Light Infantry Volunteers =

Light Infantry Volunteers 5th Battalion, The Light Infantry
- Active: 1967–1999
- Country: United Kingdom
- Branch: British Army
- Type: Infantry
- Role: Line Infantry
- Size: Regiment
- Garrison/HQ: Shrewsbury

The Light Infantry Volunteers was a short lived Territorial Army infantry regiment of the British Army, that existed from 1967 to 1972, composed of companies from the Light Infantry regiments. In 1972, it was re-designated as 5th Battalion, The Light Infantry, serving as such until amalgamation in 1999.

== History ==
Upon the creation of the TAVR, and the reduction of territorial units, the regiment was formed through the amalgamation of the Light Infantry Brigade Territorial battalions, namely: 4th Battalion, King's Shropshire Light Infantry; Duke of Cornwall's Light Infantry (TA); 4th Battalion, King's Own Yorkshire Light Infantry; 1st Battalion, Herefordshire Light Infantry; and 6th/8th Battalion, Durham Light Infantry. Upon formation, the regiment's structure was as follows:

- HQ Company (Shropshire), at Shrewsbury
  (reduction of 4th Battalion, King's Own Shropshire Light Infantry)
- A Company (Cornwall), at Truro and Bodmin
  (reduction of Duke of Cornwall's Light Infantry (TA))
- B Company (Yorkshire), at Wakefield
  (reduction of 4th Battalion, King's Own Yorkshire Light Infantry)
- C Company (Herefordshire), at Hereford
  (reduction of 1st Battalion, Herefordshire Light Infantry)
- D Company (Durham), at Durham
  (reduction of 6th/8th Battalion, Durham Light Infantry)

In 1969, a fifth rifle company (E Company (Durham)) was raised at Spennymoor and Bishop Auckland, from a cadre of 6th/8th Battalion, Durham Light Infantry. In 1975, however, this was transferred to 7th Battalion, Light Infantry, as D Company; and a new E Company was formed at Wellington and Whitchurch, from C Company, Light Infantry and Mercian Volunteers.

== 5th Battalion, The Light Infantry ==
1972, saw the regiment cease to exist, and be re-designated as the 5th Battalion, The Light Infantry with the same structure it held previously.

In 1981, A and D Companies were swapped with D Company, 6th Battalion and the C Company, 7th Battalion respectively. And in 1987, upon the raising of the 8th Battalion, A and B Companies both transferred to the new battalion as B Company and A Company respectively; however they were replaced not long after- A Company, being newly raised at Shrewsbury; and B Company, from the re designation of E Company. After all these changed, and a title change to 5th (Shropshire and Herefordshire) Battalion, The Light Infantry, in 1988, the battalion now possessed the following structure:

- HQ Company, at Shrewsbury
- A Company, at Copthorne Barracks, Shrewsbury
- B Company, at Wellington
- C Company, at Hereford
- D Company, at Ross-on-Wye

In line with the reduction of the armed forces after the end of the Cold War, the battalion was reduced to a three rifle company establishment, with A and D Companies being disbanded, with A Company being replaced by B Company, 4th (V) Battalion, Worcestershire and Sherwood Foresters Regiment, retaining its regimental identity.

The Battalion was amalgamated with 5th Battalion, Royal Regiment of Fusiliers; and 3rd Battalion, Staffordshire Regiment, in 1999, to form the West Midlands Regiment. A Company became B Company of the new regiment, HQ and C Company amalgamated to form E Company, and B Company disbanded.
