= Horninglow Street drill hall =

Building in Burton upon Trent, Staffordshire, England

- Burton upon Trent
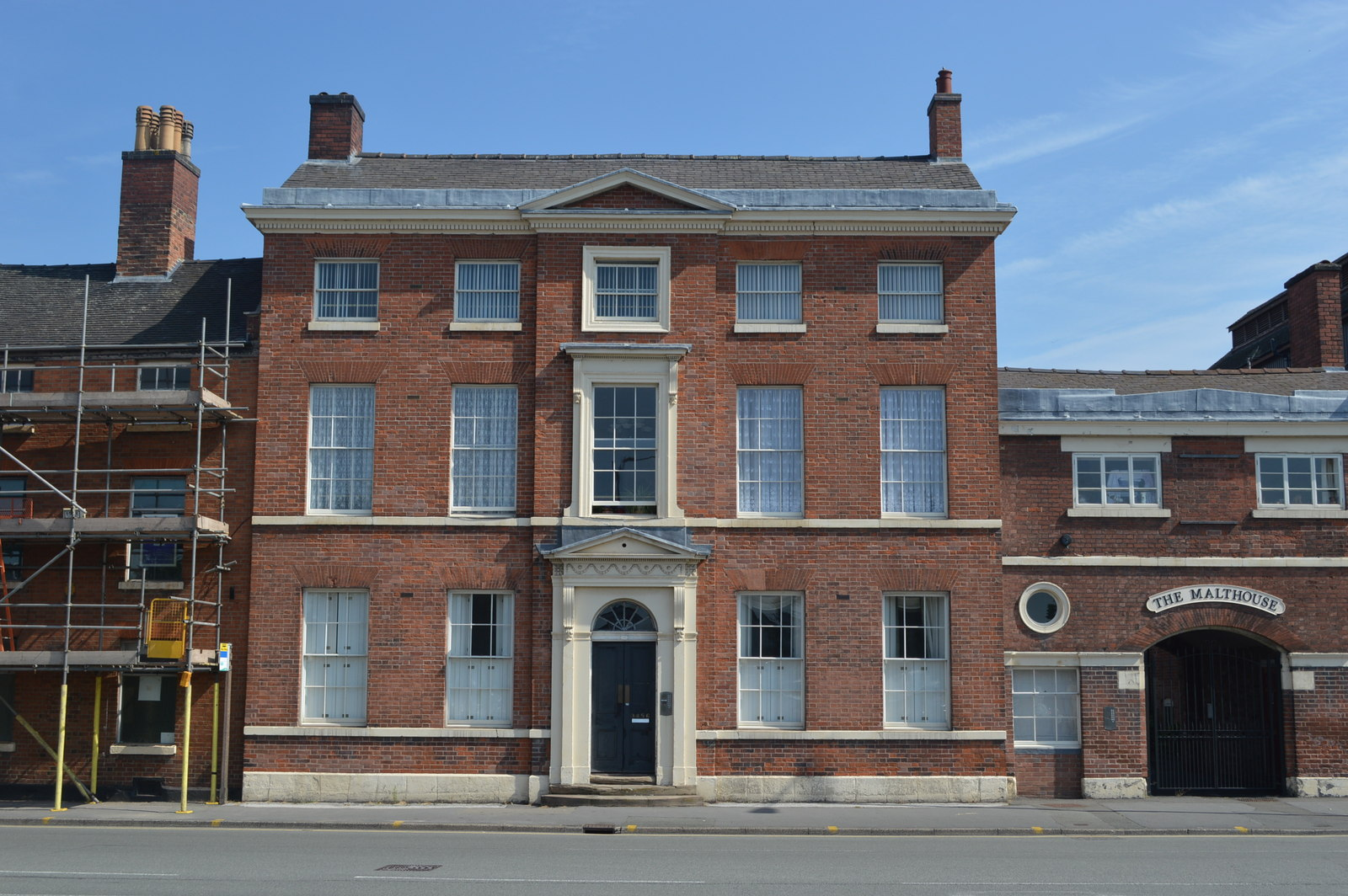
- Horninglow Street drill hall

Site information
- Type: Drill hall

Location
- Location within Staffordshire
- Coordinates: 52.80744°N 1.62947°W

Site history
- Built: Early 19th century
- Built for: War Office
- In use: Early 19th century-2000s

The Horninglow Street drill hall is a former military installation in Burton upon Trent. It is a Grade II listed building.

== History ==
The building, which was built in the early 19th century, was converted for use as the headquarters of the 2nd Volunteer Battalion, The North Staffordshire Regiment towards the end of the century. This unit evolved to become the 6th Battalion, The North Staffordshire Regiment in 1908. The battalion was mobilised at the drill hall in August 1914 before being deployed to the Western Front.

The battalion was still based at the drill hall at the start of the Second World War. It amalgamated with the 5th Battalion to form the 5th/6th Battalion in 1961. Following cut-backs in 1967, the presence at the drill hall was reduced to a single company, C Company, 1st Battalion, Mercian Volunteers in 1975; this unit evolved to become C Company, 3rd (Volunteer) Battalion, The Staffordshire Regiment (The Prince of Wales's) in 1988. Following the turn of the century, the drill was decommissioned and converted for residential use.
