= 3rd (Volunteer) Battalion, Staffordshire Regiment =

Battalion in the Territorial Army of the United Kingdom

3rd (Volunteer) Battalion, Staffordshire Regiment (Prince of Wales) C Company and D (Stafford) Companies, WMR/4 MERCIAN
- Active: 1988–present
- Country: United Kingdom
- Branch: British Army
- Type: Light Infantry
- Role: Home Defence
- Size: Company from 2006
- Part of: 49th (Eastern) Infantry Brigade (Cold War), later 143rd (West Midlands) Brigade
- Battalion HQ: Wolverhampton

The 3rd (Volunteer) Battalion, Staffordshire Regiment (Prince of Wales's) (3 STAFFORDS) was a Territorial Army unit of the regular Staffordshire Regiment (Prince of Wales') which was formed in 1988, but disbanded in 1999. The battalion's successor continues to serve in the Mercian Regiment to this day.

== Formation ==
Between 1986 and 1989 the Territorial Army (TA) was in the midst of a reformation and "generalisation", where territorial regiments were being disbanded and their companies forming new battalions attached to regular regiments. These new battalions would be given roles in support of NATO. One of the regiments that was slated to be disbanded was the Mercian Volunteers which had been formed in 1975, following the disbandment and re-rolling of many of the cadre units following the 1966 Defence White Paper.

On 5 April 1988 the 3rd (Volunteer) Battalion, The Staffordshire Regiment (Prince of Wales's) was formed as part of the 1981 Defence White Paper, which reduced the regular army slightly, while expanding the TA. As part of the changes, both battalions of Mercian Volunteers were dissolved and their companies paved the way for new TA battalions; 3rd Staffords, 4th WFR, and 3rd Cheshires.

The new battalion's organisation on formation was as follows:

- Battalion Headquarters, in Wolverhampton
- Headquarters Company, in Wolverhampton (new)
- A Company, in Tamworth (new)
- B Company, in Stoke-on-Trent (by redesignation of B Company of 2 MERCIAN)
- C Company, in Burton upon Trent (by redesignation of C Company, 1 MERCIAN)
- D Company, in Walsall (by redesignation of D Company, 2 MERCIAN)
- E (Home Service Force) Company, in Walsall and Tamworth

In 1992, as part of the Options for Change reform announced following the Dissolution of the Soviet Union, the battalion was reduced to a three company order of battle, thereby bringing it in-line with the Regular's infantry battalions. In addition to the above company changes, the Home Service Force was disbanded, and E Company soon followed suit. As a result of this, D Company in Walsall was disbanded.

== Disbandment ==
In 1998, the Territorial Army was again reduced, this time with an emphasis on the reduction of the infantry and expansion of the armoured (yeomanry) and royal artillery (air defence elements). As part of the review, new 'Territorial Regiments' were formed, all of which were one battalion in strength and had home defence roles. One of the new Territorial Regiments formed was the West Midlands Regiment, which became the successor to the Warwickshire, Shropshire, Herefordshire, West Midlands, and Staffordshire TA units.

== Further lineage ==
Therefore, on 1 July 1999 the battalion was disbanded, with B and C Companies being redesignated as D (Stafford) Company and C (Stafford) Company respectively, while HQ and A Company were disbanded.

Today these two companies continue to be part of the WMR's successor, the 4th Battalion, Mercian Regiment. In 2006, C Company merged with D (Worcestershire and Sherwood Foresters) Company to form a C company with the same prefix.

However, as part of the Army 2020 Refine, D Company was expanded and, while maintaining their prefix '(Stafford)'. D Company is currently organised with its Company HQ and one platoon in Stoke-on-Trent, with a rifle platoon in Crewe and the machine-gun platoon in Burton upon Trent.

Since 2016, D Company has been retitled as D (Dragon) Company. In late 2020, roughly half of the company were mobilised on Operation Rescript, the British Armed Forces' response to the COVID-19 pandemic.
