= 4th (Volunteer) Battalion, Worcestershire and Sherwood Foresters =

4th (Volunteer) Battalion, The Worcestershire and Sherwood Foresters
- 4 WFR
- Active: 1988 – 1993
- Country: United Kingdom
- Branch: British Army
- Type: Infantry
- Size: Battalion
- Part of: 143rd (West Midlands) Infantry Brigade
- Battalion HQ: Redditch

The 4th (Volunteer) Battalion, The Worcestershire and Sherwood Foresters (4 WFR/896 Sig Tp) was a former territorial infantry battalion that existed for a short time towards the end of the Cold War. Following reductions to the Territorial Army (TA) in 1992, the battalion was disbanded with elements helping to form RHQ, HQ Sqn and 96 (City of Coventry) Signal Squadron of 37 Signal Regiment. The latter squadron was then reduced to a signal troop in 2009, but continues to exist as part of 48 (City of Birmingham) Signal Squadron.

== Formation ==
Between 1986 and 1989, the Territorial Army (TA) was in the midst of a reformation and "generalisation", where territorial regiments were being disbanded and their companies forming new battalions attached to regular regiments. These new battalions would be given roles in support of NATO. One of the regiments that was slated to be disbanded was the Mercian Volunteers, which had been formed in 1975, following the disbandment and re-rolling of many of the cadre units following the 1966 Defence White Paper.

On 5 April 1988, the 4th (Volunteer) Battalion, The Worcestershire and Sherwood Foresters was formed as part of the 1981 Defence White Paper, which reduced the regular army slightly, while expanding the TA. As part of the changes, both battalions of Mercian Volunteers were dissolved and their companies paved the way for new TA battalions; 3rd Staffords, 4th WFR, and 3rd Cheshires.

Because the battalion was not a direct successor to either battalion of the Mercian Volunteers, it had a mixed structure from units of the former 1st and 2nd battalions. After formation, the battalion was assigned to the 143rd (West Midlands) Brigade, which was a home defence brigade overseeing the West Midlands region. If mobilised, the battalion would be assigned to Commander Communications, I (BR) Corps as a communications support unit providing rear defence and security.

Below is the structure of the battalion following its formation, with predecessors; (Note: 1 Mercians -> 1st Battalion, Mercian Volunteers and 2 Mercians -> 2nd Battalion, Mercian Volunteers.)

- Battalion Headquarters and Headquarters Company at Kohima House, Redditch
- A (Worcestershire) Company in Worcester and Stourport-on-Severn (from A Coy, 2nd Mercians)
- B (Worcestershire) Company in Kidderminster and Droitwich Spa (from B Coy, 1st Mercians)
- C (Warwickshire) Company in Birmingham (newly formed)
- D (Sherwood Foresters) Company in Nottingham (from D Coy, 1st Mercians)
- F (Home Service Force) Company in Worcester (from F Coy, 2nd Mercians)

== Disbandment ==
96 (City of Coventry) Signal Squadron 896 (City of Coventry) Signal Troop
- 96 Sig Sqn; 896 Signal Tp
- Cap badge of the Royal Corps of Signals
- Active: 1993 – present
- Country: United Kingdom
- Branch: British Army
- Type: Military communications
- Size: Troop (since 2009)
- Part of: 37th Signal Regiment
- Current Location: Coventry

Insignia
- Tactical Recognition Flash

Following the Dissolution of the Soviet Union and subsequent end to the Cold War, a sweeping armed forces reorganisation took place known as the Options for Change. One of the major changes to the army was the reduction or disbandment/conversion of many of the TA battalions that had been formed during the 1980s. As a result, it was decided that 4 WFR was to be disbanded and its sub-units distributed to other TA units. After these changes, the following occurred to the battalion (by company);

- BHQ and HQ Company re-roled as RHQ and HQ Squadron, 37th (Wessex and Welsh) Signal Regiment (V)
- A Company in Worcester disbanded and personnel moved to B Company
- B Company in Kidderminster redesignated as A (Worcestershire and Sherwood Foresters) Company in the 5th (Shropshire and Herefordshire) Battalion, The Light Infantry, retaining the regimental colours, uniform, and dress of the former battalion
- C Company in Shirley redesignated as C Company in the 5th (Volunteer) Battalion, The Royal Regiment of Fusiliers
- D Company in Nottingham disbanded and personnel moved to 3rd (Volunteer) Battalion, Worcestershire and Sherwood Foresters
- F (Home Service Force) Company disbanded

== 96 (City of Coventry) Signal Squadron ==
When the battalion was disbanded, much of the former personnel became part of the new Regimental Headquarters and Headquarters Squadron of 37 Signal Regiment. However, personnel also joined the new 96 (City of Coventry) Signal Squadron based in the Coventry, which had just formed. This squadron continued the lineage of the battalion when it joined 37 Signal Regiment in November 1992.

The squadron was later reduced to 896 (City of Coventry) Signal Troop as part of the 2009 review of reserve forces. Today, the squadron forms part of 48 (City of Birmingham) Signal Squadron in 37 Signal Regiment providing command support teams and support to HQ 11th Signal Brigade & HQ West Midlands.

== Footnotes ==
Notes

Citations
