= Francis Tomkinson =

English cricketer

Cricket information
- Batting: Right-handed

Career statistics
Competition	First-class
Matches	1
Runs scored	0
Batting average	0.00
100s/50s	0/0
Top score	0
Catches/stumpings	1/–
- Source: Cricinfo, 7 November 2022

Francis Martin Tomkinson DSO & Bar (21 October 1883 – 24 November 1963) was an English cricketer who played one first-class cricket match, for Worcestershire against Hampshire in 1902. He made a duck in his only innings, but did take one catch, to dismiss Arthur Webb off the bowling of George Alfred Wilson.

On 2 December 1916 Tomkinson took over as Commanding Officer with the rank of lieutenant colonel in 1/7th Battalion, Worcestershire Regiment, in which he remained in the position until 4 April 1919. During his service, he was awarded a DSO and Bar in 1917. On 1 July 1929 he became 'Honorary Colonel' in the 7th Worcs.

He was a member of the well-known Kidderminster carpet-making family.

Tomkinson was born at Franche Hall, Kidderminster, Worcestershire; he died at Chilton, Cleobury Mortimer, Shropshire at the age of 80.

His brother Geoffrey played twice for Worcestershire.
