= Geoffrey Tomkinson =

English sportsman and industrialist

Career statistics
Competition	First-class
Matches	2
Runs scored	12
Batting average	4.00
100s/50s	0/0
Top score	10
Catches/stumpings	0/–
- Source: Cricinfo, 7 November 2022

Sir Geoffrey Stewart Tomkinson MC (7 November 1881 - 8 February 1963 (aged 81)) was an English sportsman and industrialist. He played two first-class cricket matches for Worcestershire, 23 years apart.

Born at Franche Hall, Kidderminster, Worcestershire, Tomkinson attended Winchester College and played for the cricket XI. He then went to King's College at Cambridge University and competed at rowing, rugby union and football; he also played cricket for the college, but did not win a university blue.

After leaving university, he played one match for Worcestershire, against Cambridge University, in 1903; he scored just 1. He worked as an engineer on the Great Western Railway of Brazil, then when World War I broke out he served in the Worcestershire Regiment, reaching the rank of Lieutenant colonel. He was wounded twice, mentioned in dispatches, and was awarded the Military Cross.

He then devoted himself largely to the family business, Tomkinsons Carpets. In the 1920s he returned to cricket, mostly playing for the Kidderminster club side – he once scored 200 in two hours in the Birmingham League. In 1926 he played his second and final first-class game, against Derbyshire, though again he made little impact, being dismissed for 10 and 1. He also played for the prominent amateur club Gentlemen of Worcestershire well into his fifties. He became President of Worcestershire County Cricket Club in 1956.

Tomkinson was also keen on rugby union, and was one of the founders of Kidderminster RFC. He captained the side from 1921 to 1924, and in the 1940s he made an impromptu comeback to make up the numbers in one game, when he was 63 years old.

He died in Kidderminster at the age of 81.

His brother Francis played one game for Worcestershire in 1902.
