= The Shrubbery, Kidderminster =

19th-century house in Worcestershire, England

The Shrubbery
- Kidderminster
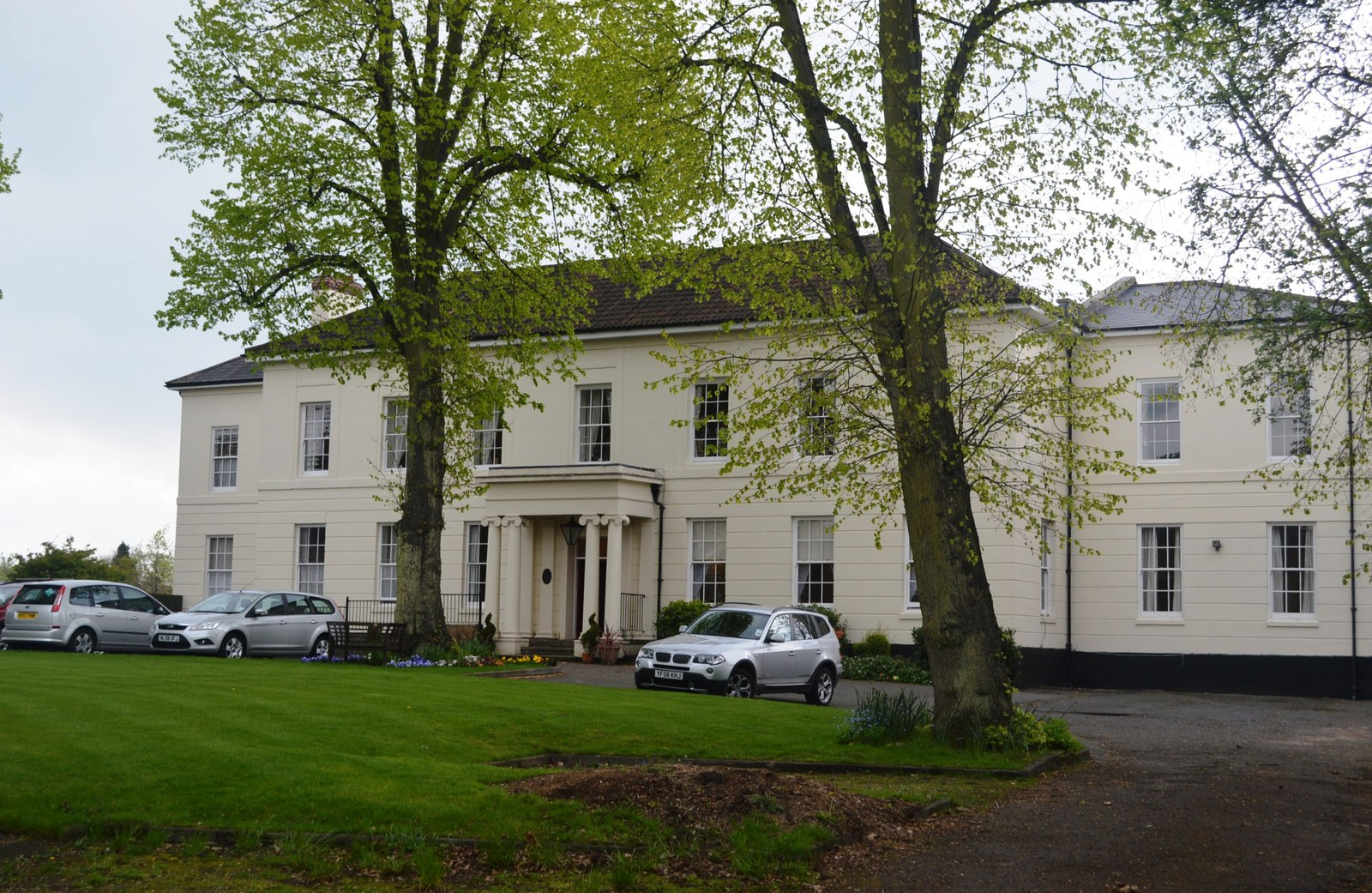
- The Shrubbery

Site information
- Type: Drill hall

Location
- Location in Worcestershire
- Coordinates: 52.39119°N 2.23632°W

Site history
- Built: Late 19th century
- Built for: War Office
- In use: Late 19th century – 1994

The Shrubbery is a former military installation in Kidderminster, Worcestershire. It is a Grade II listed building.

== History ==
The building is an early 19th-century mansion which was owned by the Lea family in the first half of that century. It then passed into the hands of a Major Winnington in the second half of the century. It was converted around the end of the century for use as the headquarters of the 1st Volunteer Battalion, Worcestershire Regiment. This unit evolved to become the 7th Battalion, Worcestershire Regiment in 1908. The battalion was mobilised at the mansion in August 1914 before being deployed to the Western Front. The battalion was also based at the mansion at the start of the Second World War.

The battalion was reduced to a single company, B Company (Worcestershire), The Mercian Volunteers, in 1967. The company evolved to become A Company, 5th Battalion, The Light Infantry (Volunteers) in 1992 and A (Worcestershire and Sherwood Foresters Regiment) Company, 5th Battalion, The (Shropshire and Herefordshire) Light Infantry (Volunteers) in 1993. The Ministry of Defence decided to move the unit to a more modern adjacent building in October 1994. The mansion was subsequently decommissioned and, in February 1998, it was converted into a nursing home.

== See also ==
- Worcestershire Rifles
