= Light Infantry and Mercian Volunteers =

- Active: 1971–1975
- Allegiance: United Kingdom
- Branch: British Army
- Role: Line Infantry
- Size: One Battalion
- Garrison/HQ: Wolverhampton

The Light Infantry and Mercian Volunteers was a short-lived infantry regiment of the British Army, in existence from 1971 to 1975.

== History ==
The battalion was formed on the 1 April 1971, from the cadres of former Midland infantry battalions that had been reduced as a result of the 1966 Defence White Paper and formation of the much smaller TAVR. Its initial structure was:

- Headquarters, at Wolseley House, Wolverhampton
- A (Worcestershire Regiment) Company, at Worcester
  (from 7th Battalion, Worcestershire Regiment)
- B (5th/6th Battalion Staffordshire Regiment) Company, at Stoke-on-Trent
  (from 5th/6th Battalion, Staffordshire Regiment)
- C (King's Shropshire Light Infantry) Company, at Wellington
  (from 4th Battalion, King's Shropshire Light Infantry)
- D (Herefordshire Light Infantry) Company, at Ross-on-Wye
  (from 1st Battalion, Herefordshire Light Infantry)
- E Company, at Whittimere Street drill hall, Walsall
  (newly raised)

Only four years later, however, the regiment was broken up and the companies were distributed amongst other battalions. Namely: A, B, and E Companies to the 2nd Battalion, Mercian Volunteers as A, B, and D Companies respectively; C Company to 5th Battalion, The Light Infantry, as E Company; and D Company to 6th Battalion, The Light Infantry, with the same lettering.

== Deputy Honorary Colonels ==
The regiment didn't have an Honorary Colonel as a whole, however from 1971–1972 each company maintained their own Deputy Honorary Colonel, in succession to the previous unit. These were:

- A Company: Lieutenant-Colonel Alexander W.R.H. Pettigrew, OBE, TD
- B Company: Colonel Charles J. Baines, CBE, MC, TD, DL
- C & D Companies: Lieutenant-Colonel Guy M. Thorneycroft, DL
