= Worcestershire and Sherwood Foresters Regiment =

The Worcestershire and Sherwood Foresters Regiment (29th/45th Foot) (WFR)
- Cap badge
- Active: 1970–2007
- Allegiance: United Kingdom
- Branch: British Army
- Type: Infantry
- Role: Light Infantry
- Size: One battalion
- Part of: Prince of Wales' Division
- Garrison/HQ: 1st Battalion - London
- Nickname: Woofers
- Motto: Stand Firm Strike Hard
- March: Quick: Young May Moon & The Royal Windsor; Slow: "Duchess of Kent"
- Mascot: Ram named Private Derby
- Engagements: See honours list

Commanders
- Last Colonel-in-Chief: The Princess Royal, KG, KT, GCVO
- Colonel of the Regiment: Colonel Jonathan Rupert Maunsell Hackett, CBE

The Worcestershire and Sherwood Foresters Regiment (29th/45th Foot) (abbreviated as WFR) was an infantry regiment of the British Army, part of the Prince of Wales' Division. The regiment served as the county regiment for Derbyshire, Nottinghamshire and Worcestershire.

== History ==
The regiment was formed in 1970 through the amalgamation of the Worcestershire Regiment and the Sherwood Foresters. The regiment was based at Battlesbury Barracks in Warminster and undertook a tour in Northern Ireland in 1972 during the Troubles. It moved to Berlin later that year and to Shackleton Barracks at Ballykelly in 1974 before returning to Meanee Barracks in Colchester in 1976. After a further tour in Northern Ireland in 1977 the regiment moved to Peninsula Barracks at Hemer in 1979.

The regiment undertook another tour in Northern Ireland in 1982 before moving back to Battlesbury Barracks in Warminster in 1984 and relocating to Oakington Barracks in Cambridge in 1986, completing a 6 month tour with the British Contingent of the United Nations Force In Cyprus (UNFICYP) from June to December 1987, and then to Lisanelly Barracks in Omagh in 1989.

After a deployment to Cyprus in 1991 - this time as a British Forces Cyprus Residential Infantry Battalion - the regiment moved to Lucknow Barracks at Tidworth in 1993 from where elements of the regiment were deployed to Bosnia in 1996 and 1998. The regiment undertook an operational tour in Afghanistan as part of Operation Herrick in 2004 and then moved to Cavalry Barracks, Hounslow as a public duties battalion in July 2005.

In 2004, as a part of the reorganisation of the infantry, it was announced that the Worcestershire and Sherwood Foresters Regiment would be amalgamated with the Cheshire Regiment and the Staffordshire Regiment to form the new Mercian Regiment. In August 2007, the regiment became the 2nd Battalion, The Mercian Regiment.

== Structure ==
The structure of the regiment was as follows:

- Regimental Headquarters, Worcestershire and Sherwood Foresters, at Norton Barracks, Worcester
- 1st Battalion (Regulars)
  - Band of the 1st Battalion, Worcestershire and Sherwood Foresters (Regulars) - formed part of the Clive Band of the Prince of Wales's Division following the formation of CAMUS in 1994
- 3rd (Volunteer) Battalion (Volunteers) - formed in 1971, disbanded in 1999 forming part of the East of England Regiment
- 4th (Volunteer) Battalion (Volunteers) - disbanded in 1993, forming part of RHQ and HQ Sqn of 37 Signal Regiment, and formed new 96 (City of Coventry) Signal Squadron

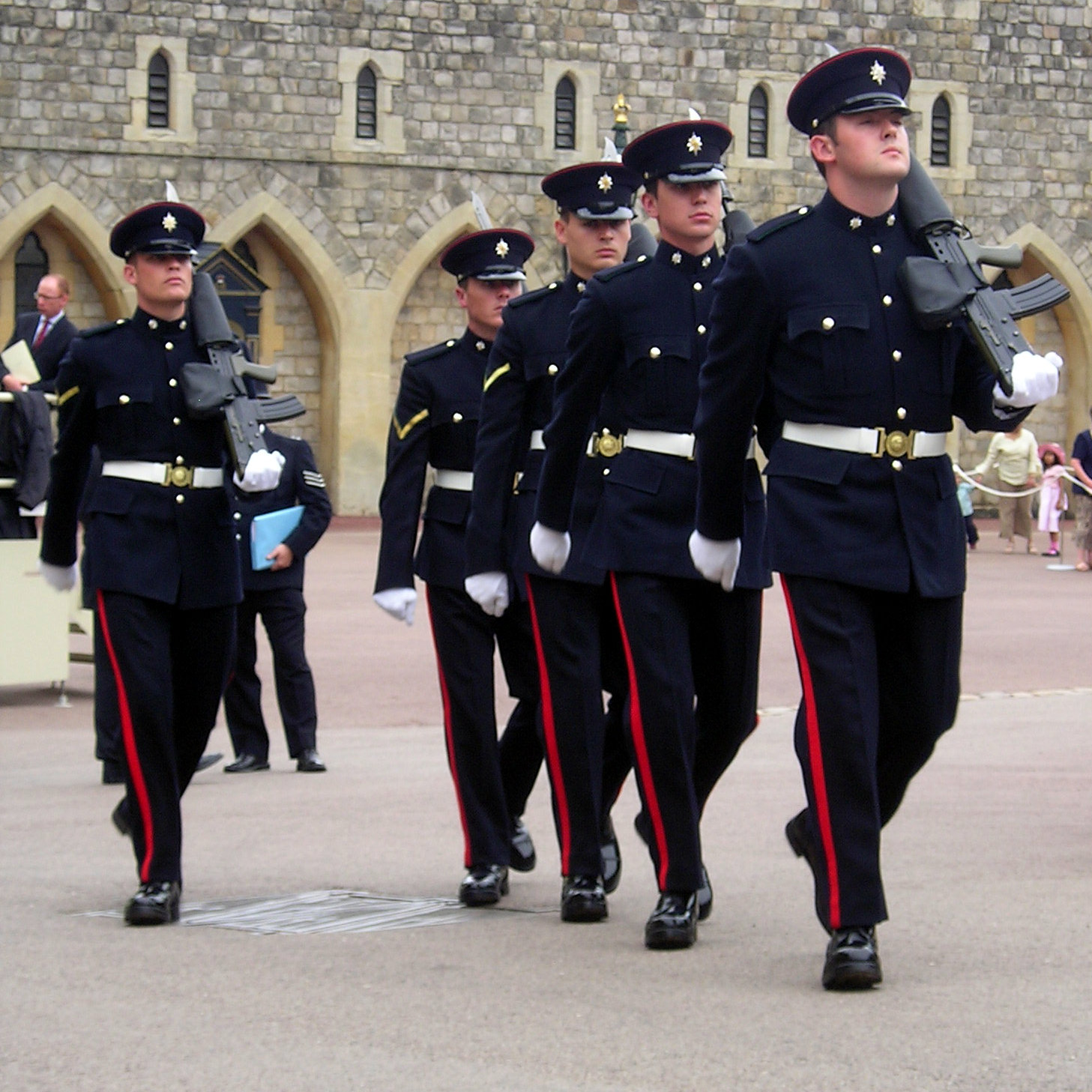
Soldiers from the Worcestershire and Sherwood Foresters on Guard Duty at Windsor Castle

== Marches & Music ==
The regimental quick march of the regiment was an arrangement of "Young May Moon" and "Royal Windsor". The slow march was "Duchess of Kent". The regiment also maintained two unofficial marches: "I'm Ninety Five" and "The Derby Ram".

The regimental bugle call 'The Spanish' is played before formal Mess Nights to notify officers to assemble was started by the 45th (Nottinghamshire) (Sherwood Foresters) Regiment of Foot. This tradition started during the Peninsular War when the bugle call was used to call local Spanish nuns to bring meals to the officers' mess. The tradition has continued into the 2nd Battalion, Mercian Regiment.

== Regimental ram ==
The regimental ram was known as Corporal Derby. The ram was the 28th ram to act as mascot for the regiment and its predecessor regiments. The first ram was captured by the 95th (Derbyshire) Regiment of Foot at the Siege of Kotah in 1858. Since 1912 successive Dukes of Devonshire have traditionally selected a Swaledale Ram from their Chatsworth Park flock and presented it to the regiment. The ram had its own regimental number (28), was paid £3.75 per day, and drew his own rations.

== Alliances ==
- Canada - The Grey and Simcoe Foresters
- Pakistan - 13th Battalion, The Punjab Regiment
- Royal Navy - HMS Nottingham
