= Whittimere Street drill hall =

Former military installation

- Walsall
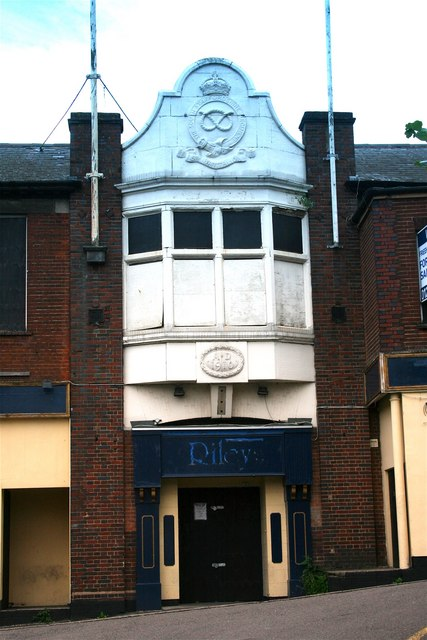
- Whittimere Street drill hall

Site information
- Type: Drill hall

Location
- Location within West Midlands
- Coordinates: 52.58597°N 1.97758°W

Site history
- Built: 1866
- Built for: War Office
- In use: 1866-1984

The Whittimere Street drill hall is a former military installation in Walsall, West Midlands.

== History ==
The building was designed as the headquarters of the 3rd Staffordshire Rifle Volunteer Corps and was completed in 1866. This unit evolved to become the 2nd Volunteer Battalion, the South Staffordshire Regiment in 1885 and the 5th Battalion, the South Staffordshire Regiment in 1908. The drill hall was substantially remodelled in 1910. The battalion was mobilised at the drill hall in August 1914 before being deployed to the Western Front.

The presence at the drill hall was reduced to a single company, B (South Stafford) Company, 5th/6th (Territorial) Battalion, The Staffordshire Regiment (The Prince of Wales's), in 1967 which evolved to become D Company, 2nd Battalion, Mercian Volunteers in 1975. After the battalion left the drill hall in 1984, it was decommissioned and subsequently converted for use as a nightclub.
