= Home Service Force =

- Active: 1982–1993
- Disbanded: 1993
- Country: United Kingdom
- Branch: Territorial Army
- Type: Home guard
- Role: Defence from invasion
- Size: 5000 members in 50 companies
- Nickname: HSF

The Home Service Force (HSF) was a Home Guard type force established in the United Kingdom in 1982. Each HSF unit was placed with either a Regular Army or Territorial Army regiment or battalion for administrative purposes and given that formation's title, cap badge and recruited from volunteers aged 18–60 with previous British forces (TA or regular) experience. It was introduced to guard key points and installations likely to be the target of enemy special forces and saboteurs, so releasing other units for mobile defence roles. It was stood down in 1992 due to budget cuts.

== History ==
The pilot started in September 1982 and consisted of four companies that were used to relieve the army of guarding key points. The personnel consisted of 18- to 60-year-olds with a training obligation of 4-5 weekends per year. In 1984, there were platoons in 11 cities and the force began expanding to 5,000 persons nationwide, with the goal of establishing a platoon in every Territorial Army company by 1988.

It was decided to disband the HSF in 1991; the last unit was disbanded in 1993.

There was never a common cap badge or regimental/corps crest for the Home Service Force. Each officer and soldier wore the cap badge of their sponsoring regiment or battalion.

A modern crest does exist, granted to the Home Service Force Association, but to avoid confusion, it is not shown here. It can be viewed on The HSF Association website.

== Recruitment ==
Comprising ex-regular, ex-territorial and ex-uniformed service personnel and the results proved to be much better than anticipated.

The recruitment of ex-servicemen with a minimum of two years experience enabled units to come up to operational readiness very quickly.

== HSF Sub-Units ==
There were at least 50 HSF squadrons or companies formed by 1985. Only one was a Royal Artillery battery. Each of these usually comprised three troops or platoons.

Each company-sized unit operated under the command of a regiment or battalion. Regiments, in this case, were formations comprising three to four batteries or squadrons. Battalions had a similar number of companies, but could have many more.

Secondly, on inspection of the list (below), there is a high potential for confusion between the HSF formations that existed at the time, and the Veterans' Groups that have been created since. As a general guide, it should be remembered that the HSF was designed to have a county presence; and this can be useful in ensuring accuracy. Some HSF formations had its headquarters and two platoons in one county, and a strong detached platoon in an adjacent county; other formations had all its platoons spread amongst separate towns; some formations had their entire organisation based at the same TA Centre.

Many HSF troops and platoons (comprising approximately 30 soldiers) were based at a TA Centre that was managed by another unit; and local arrangements were necessary in order to operate. As a result, the personnel in that troop or platoon created a very strong bond of mutual friendship that ensured their survival, and which continues today in retirement. As a result, many HSF Veterans have become focused on their own troop or platoon experiences, sometimes to the detriment of those of their parent unit. As a result, troops or platoons may be listed (below), but they were actually part of a larger HSF formation.

The Pilot HSF Companies (1982 - 1984/85)

Four pilot Companies, formed in 1982, quickly became very popular and grew rapidly in personnel and in territory. In 1984/5, when plans to make the HSF official became known, their territories split, spawning new neighbouring units. For example, E (HSF) Coy 2nd Bn, The Wessex Regiment spawned HSF squadrons or companies in Devon, Wiltshire and Somerset.

- Z (HSF) Coy 1st (V) Bn, 51st Highland Volunteers (HQ in Perth). The Black Watch (The Royal Highland Regt).
- E (HSF) Coy 2nd (V) Bn, The Wessex Regiment (HQ in Reading)
- E (HSF) Coy 6th (V) Bn, The Royal Anglian Regiment (Bedfordshire & Hertfordshire)
- F (HSF) Coy 2nd Bn, The Mercian Volunteers (HQ in Worcester)

Rebadging and Precedence

The subunits shown below are listed by their final titles, where they may have rebadged (transferred) from one sponsor formation to another. Cross references have been attempted. They are listed according to modern regiments or corps existing in 2012. While restructuring and realignment is always difficult to accept in a culture of intense rivalry such as this, the word "association" may have a variety of meanings. Each regiment and corps of the British Army has a number and even if absorbed into a new regiment or corps, its order of precedence can be calculated. It is hoped that the following order conforms to this. The HSF was organised in districts between 1985 and 1992, and while that order is offered on the HSF Association website, the order below has been attempted.

The Honourable Artillery Company

- 1 & 2 (HSF) Coys, The Honourable Artillery Company (in The City of London) [also listed as A & B Coys)

The Royal Artillery

- A (HSF) Bty 103 Air Defence Regt Royal Artillery (Volunteers) (in Liverpool)

The Yeomanry

- E (Wiltshire Yeomanry HSF) Sqn, The Royal Wessex Yeomanry (in Old Sarum, Wilts)
- C (HSF) Sqn, The Duke of Lancasters Yeomanry (in Chorley)
- D (HSF) Sqn, Queen's Own Mercian Yeomanry (in Telford, Shropshire). Rebadged in 1988 from D (HSF) Company 15th Bn Royal Army Ordnance Corps.

Those now associated with The Royal Regiment of Scotland:

- Z (HSF) Coy 1st (V) Bn, 51st Highland Volunteers (in Perth, Kirkaldy & Dundee) Black Watch (The Royal Highland Regt).
- X (HSF) Coy 2nd (V) Bn, 51st Highland Volunteers (in Aberdeen) Gordon Highlanders.
- Y (HSF) Coy 2nd (V) Bn, 51st Highland Volunteers (in Elgin) Queen's Own Highlanders.
- W (HSF) Coy 3rd (V) Bn, 51st Highland Volunteers (in Stirling) Argyll & Sutherland Highlanders.
- F (HSF) Coy 1st (V) Bn, 52nd Lowland Volunteers (in Ayr) The Royal Scots.
- G (HSF) Coy 1st (V) Bn, 52nd Lowland Volunteers (in Dumfries) The King's Own Scottish Borderers.
- 5 (HSF) Coy 2nd (V) Bn, 52nd Lowland Volunteers (in Edinburgh) The Royal Scots.

Those now associated with The Princess of Wales' Royal Regiment:

- E (HSF) Coy 5th (V) Bn, The Queen's Regiment (Kent & East Sussex)
- E (HSF) Coy 6/7th (V) Bn, The Queen's Regiment (Surrey)
- see also E (HSF) Coy 2nd Bn The Wessex Regiment (Portsmouth Platoon)

Those now associated with The Duke of Lancaster's Royal Regiment:

- E (HSF) Coy 5th/8th (V) Bn, The Kings Regiment (in Greater Manchester & South Lancs)
- E (HSF) Coy 4th (V) Bn, The Kings Own Border Regiment (in Carlisle & Lancaster)

Those now associated with The Royal Regiment of Fusiliers:

- G (HSF) Coy 5th (V) Bn, The Royal Regiment of Fusiliers (in Coventry, with a detached Platoon in Birmingham).
- S (St.Lucia)(HSF) Coy 6th (V) Bn, The Royal Regiment of Fusiliers (in Newcastle upon Tyne)

Those now associated with The Royal Anglian Regiment:

- 5 (HSF) Coy 5th (V) Bn, The Royal Anglian Regiment (in Cambridgeshire)
- 6 (HSF) Coy 5th (V) Bn, The Royal Anglian Regiment (in Essex)
- E (HSF) Coy 6th (V) Bn, The Royal Anglian Regiment (in Bedfordshire & Hertfordshire)
- F (HSF) Coy 6th (V) Bn, The Royal Anglian Regiment (at Norwich, with a detached Platoon in Ipswich)
- E (HSF) Coy 7th (V) Bn, The Royal Anglian Regiment (in Leicester, with a detached Platoon in Lincoln)
- 18 Platoon, 6 (HSF) Coy, 5th (V) Battalion, The Royal Anglian Regiment [to be verified]

Those now associated with The Rifles:

- G (HSF) Coy 4th (V) Bn. The Devonshire & Dorset Regiment (in Exeter)
- H (HSF) Coy 4th (V) Bn, Royal Green Jackets (in West London)
- I (HSF) Coy 5th (V) Bn, Royal Green Jackets, (in Aldershot, Winchester & The IOW)
- E (HSF) Coy 6th (V) (Somerset and Cornwall) Bn, The Light Infantry (in Bath, Somerset)
- F (HSF) Coy 6th (V) (Somerset and Cornwall) Bn, The Light Infantry (in Truro, Cornwall)
- E (HSF) Coy 7th (V) Bn, The Light Infantry (in Bishop Auckland)
- E (HSF) Coy 2nd (V) Bn, The Wessex Regiment (in Reading, Maidenhead & Portsmouth)

The Wessex Regt had its own cap badge, which, in the Maidenhead Company, was worn with a red triangular back patch. A minority of troops with this company might now claim association with The Princess of Wales' Royal Regiment, through a contemporary association with The Royal Hampshire Regiment.

Those now associated with The Yorkshire Regiment:

- H (HSF) Coy, 2nd Bn The Yorkshire Volunteers (York)
- H (HSF) Coy, 3rd Bn The Yorkshire Volunteers (Huddersfield & Halifax)
- H (HSF) Coy, 4th Bn The Yorkshire Volunteers (Sheffield, Barnsley & Rotherham)

Troops of The Yorkshire Volunteers wore a separate cap badge, but were affiliated to the three, then independent, Yorkshire infantry regiments

Those now associated with The Mercian Regiment:

- E (HSF) Coy 3rd (V) Bn, The 22nd (Cheshire) Regiment (in Stockport & Runcorn)
- F (HSF) Coy 3rd (V) Bn, Worcestershire and Sherwood Foresters Regiment (in Worksop, Mansfield & Beeston, Nottinghamshire)
- G (HSF) Coy 3rd (V) Bn, Worcestershire and Sherwood Foresters (in Derby & Chesterfield, Derbyshire)
- F (HSF) Coy 4th (V) Bn, Worcestershire and Sherwood Foresters (in Worcester & Kidderminster, Worcestershire); rebadged in 1988 from F (HSF) Coy 2nd Bn, The Mercian Volunteers (Worcester & Kidderminster).
- E (HSF) Coy 3rd (V) Bn, The Staffordshire Regiment(Prince of Wales's) (in Walsall, with an outstation in Tamworth). Rebadged in 1988 from The Mercian Volunteers.

The Mercian Volunteers was a Territorial formation accommodating the Volunteer elements of the Regiments that formed The Mercian Brigade, which, from 1963, comprised all the antecedent regiments that came together in 2007 to form the Mercian Regiment. In 1985, it absorbed the neighbouring Light Infantry and Mercian Volunteers, forming two battalions. In 1988, it was disbanded, with its companies rebadged (transferred) back to their original county regiments. The Mercian Volunteers Regimental Association remains independent of The Mercian Regiment, but enjoys an association with it.

Those now associated with The Royal Welsh:

- E (HSF) Coy 3rd (V) Bn, The Royal Welch Fusiliers (Wrexham & North Wales)
- E (HSF) Coy 3rd (V) Bn, The Royal Regiment of Wales (Cardiff)
- E (HSF) Coy 4th (V) Bn, The Royal Regiment of Wales (Swansea)

The Parachute Regiment

- 5 Coy (HSF) 10th (V) Bn, The Parachute Regt (London and the rest of the United Kingdom)

The Corps of Royal Signals

- 347 (HSF) Sqn, 11th Signal Regiment, Royal Corps of Signals (in Catterick Garrison)
- 348 (Inns of Court & City Yeomanry HSF) Signal Squadron (The Devils' Own) Royal Signals (in The City of London). (Listed here because of their Signals role)

Those now associated with the Royal Logistic Corps:

- 218 (HSF) Sqn, Royal Corps of Transport (in Hull) [to be verified]
- Platoon 219 Sqn, Royal Corps of Transport (in Doncaster)[to be verified]
- 300 (HSF) Sqn, Royal Corps of Transport (in Leconfield, East Yorkshire)
- 301 (HSF) Sqn, Royal Corps of Transport (in Hull) [300 & 301 Sqns merged in 1986]
- 302 (HSF) Sqn, Royal Corps of Transport (in South Cerney, Gloucestershire)
- D (HSF) Coy 15th Bn RAOC, later rebadged (above) to D (HSF) Sqn QOMY

== See also ==
- Operation Gladio
- Civil Defence Corps
- Gendarmerie
- Paramilitary
- Militia
- Yeomanry
- Volunteer Force
- Belgian stay-behind network
- Australian Military Forces
- Thahan Phran
- Volunteer Defense Corps (Thailand)
- List of paramilitary organizations
