= 52nd Lowland Volunteers =

52nd Lowland, 6th Battalion, The Royal Regiment of Scotland
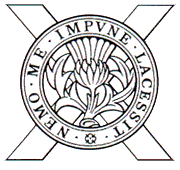
- Active: 28 March 2006 – present
- Allegiance: United Kingdom
- Branch: British Army
- Type: Line Infantry
- Role: Army Reserve Light Role
- Size: Battalion; 470 personnel
- Part of: 4th Infantry Brigade and Headquarters North East
- Garrison/HQ: BHQ – Glasgow; HQ Company – Glasgow; A Company – Edinburgh; B Company – Ayr; C Company – Glasgow
- Motto: Nemo Me Impune Lacessit (No One Assails Me With Impunity) (Latin)
- March: Quick – Across the Lowlands; Slow – Mist Covered Mountains; Royal Salute – St. Andrew's Cross (Pipes and Drums); God Save the King (Military Band) Commanding Officer's Orders – A Man's A Man for A' That
- Anniversaries: Walcheren Day (8 November)

Commanders
- Royal Colonel: The Princess Royal KG KT GCVO GCStJ QSO CD GCL
- Honorary Colonel: Major-General Alastair Bruce of Crionaich CB OBE VR

Insignia
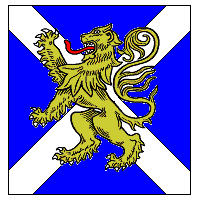
- Tactical Recognition Flash
- Tartan: Government; Red Erskine (Pipes and Drums); Hunting Stewart (Military Band)
- Hackle: Grey
- Abbreviation: 6 SCOTS

The 52nd Lowland Volunteers (52 LOWLAND) is a battalion in the British Army's Army Reserve or reserve force in the Scottish Lowlands, forming the 6th Battalion of the Royal Regiment of Scotland, also known as 6 SCOTS. Due to its erstwhile association with the 1st Regiment of Foot, it is the senior Reserve line infantry battalion in the British Army. It is one of two Reserve battalions in the Royal Regiment of Scotland, along with 51st Highland (7 SCOTS), a similar unit located in the Scottish Highlands.

Originally formed as the 52nd Lowland Volunteers in 1967, as a result of the amalgamation of Territorial Battalions within the infantry Regiments of the Lowland Brigade, the name commemorated the 52nd (Lowland) Division of the Territorial Force, within which many of the Regiment's antecedent Territorial Battalions served during the First and Second World Wars.

== History ==
=== Origins and First World War ===
The current Battalion traces its lineage back to the reserve Rifle Volunteer units that were originally raised in the Scottish Lowlands as part of the Victorian Volunteer Force by Lord Lieutenants in every county. These included: the Queens City of Edinburgh Rifle Volunteers, the Midlothian Rifle Volunteers, the Haddingtonshire Rifle Volunteers, the Linlithgowshire Rifle Volunteers, the Ayrshire Rifle Volunteers, the Roxburghshire and Selkirk (The Border) Rifle Volunteers, the Berwickshire Rifle Volunteers, the Dumfriesshire Rifle Volunteers, the Galloway Rifle Volunteers, and the Lanarkshire Rifle Volunteers.

The 1st Battalion of the Lanarkshire Rifle Volunteers were raised in 1860, and counted Boys' Brigade founder William Alexander Smith amongst its ranks. The 3rd Battalion of the Lanarkshire Rifle Volunteers, raised in 1859, was also notable for its football team, which became the famous Third Lanark, and the 105th (Glasgow Highlanders) Battalion of the Lanarkshire Rifle Volunteers, which was raised in 1868, was one of several Volunteer Force units that first saw overseas service during the Second Boer War.

The various county battalions of Rifle Volunteers first became affiliated to a newly designated local regular Line Infantry Regiment with the Childers Reforms of 1881.

The current unit is the direct descendant of the infantry battalions that made up the 52nd Lowland Division, of which Lowland Rifle Volunteer units, including the Glasgow Highlanders et al, became a part. This division was formed as part of the Haldane Reforms, which integrated the Volunteer Force, Militia and the Yeomanry into the nascent Territorial Force, created by the Territorial and Reserve Forces Act 1907.

The local Regular Line Infantry Regiments at the time were: the Royal Scots (Lothian), the Royal Scots Fusiliers (Ayrshire), the Highland Light Infantry (Glasgow), the King's Own Scottish Borderers (Borders, Dumfries and Galloway) and the Cameronians (Lanarkshire). At this time the various Volunteer Battalions were also reformed as fully integrated Territorial Battalions within their affiliated Lowland Infantry Regiments.

The Royal Scots (TF Battalions), c. 1908	The Royal Scots Fusiliers (TF Battalions), c. 1908	The Highland Light Infantry (TF Battalions), c. 1908	The King's Own Scottish Borderers (TF Battalions), c. 1908	The Cameronians (Scottish Rifles) (TF Battalions), c. 1908
4th (Queen's Edinburgh Rifles) Bn, The Royal Scots, at Forrest Hill in Edinburgh	4th Bn, The Royal Scots Fusiliers, at Titchfield Street in Kilmarnock	5th (City of Glasgow) Bn, The Highland Light Infantry, at Hill Street in Glasgow	4th (Border) Bn, The King's Own Scottish Borderers, at Paton Street in Galashiels	5th Bn, The Cameronians (Scottish Rifles), at West Princes Street in Glasgow
5th (Queen's Edinburgh Rifles) Bn, The Royal Scots, at Forrest Hill in Edinburgh	5th Bn, The Royal Scots Fusiliers, at Burns Statue Square in Ayr	6th (City of Glasgow) Bn, The Highland Light Infantry, at Yorkhill Street in Glasgow	5th (Dumfries & Galloway) Bn, The King's Own Scottish Borderers at Loreburn Hall in Dumfries	6th Bn, The Cameronians (Scottish Rifles), at Muirhall in Hamilton (Note: Located at the corner of Muir Street and Almada Street and since demolished)
6th Bn, The Royal Scots, at Gilmore Place in Edinburgh		7th (Blythswood) Bn, The Highland Light Infantry, at Main Street in Bridgeton		7th Bn, The Cameronians (Scottish Rifles), at Victoria Road, Pollokshaws, south side Glasgow
7th Bn, The Royal Scots, at Dalmeny Street in Leith		8th (Lanark) Bn, The Highland Light Infantry, at Lanark (Disbanded 1914)		8th Bn, The Cameronians (Scottish Rifles), at Cathedral Street in Glasgow
8th Bn, The Royal Scots, at Nungate in Haddington		9th (Glasgow Highland) Bn, The Highland Light Infantry, at Greendyke Street in Glasgow		
9th (Highlanders) Bn, The Royal Scots, at East Claremont Street in Edinburgh				
10th (Cyclist) Bn, The Royal Scots, at the High Street in Linlithgow				

Although the 7th Battalion, Royal Scots was severely depleted by the Quintinshill rail disaster, they and the other Territorial Battalions of the 52nd (Lowland) Division fought in the First World War at Gallipoli, in Egypt and Palestine as part of the Egyptian Expeditionary Force, and on the Western Front in France, where it fought in the 2nd Battle of the Somme, the 2nd Battle of Arras and at the Battle of the Hindenburg Line during the Hundred Days Offensive. Notable 52nd Lowlanders who served during this period included footballer William Reid, motorcycle racer Jimmie Guthrie, Winston Churchill, who briefly commanded the 6th Battalion of the Royal Scots Fusiliers in the "New Army" and John Reith, who was a subaltern with the 5th Battalion of the Cameronians (Scottish Rifles). Victoria Cross recipients John Brown Hamilton and David Ross Lauder served with the Glasgow Highlanders and the 4th RSF respectively. James Youll Turnbull served with the 17th (Chambers of Commerce) Battalion of the Highland Light Infantry, one of three HLI "Pals battalions" formed during the war. VC recipient and Celtic player William Angus, also served with the antecedent 8th Royal Scots, as part of the 7th Division.

=== Interwar period and Second World War ===
After the Armistice, the Territorial Force and its formations were disbanded. It was re-established, by the Territorial Army and Militia Act 1921, as the Territorial Army however, and the original Lowland Territorial Battalions were reconstituted, although there were several amalgamations.

The Royal Scots (TA Battalions), c. 1921	The Royal Scots Fusiliers (TA Battalions), c. 1921	The Highland Light Infantry (TA Battalions), c. 1921	The King's Own Scottish Borderers (TA Battalions), c. 1921	The Cameronians (Scottish Rifles) (TA Battalions), c. 1921
4th/5th (Queen's Edinburgh Rifles) Bn, The Royal Scots, at Forrest Hill in Edinburgh	4th/5th Bn, The Royal Scots Fusiliers, in Kilmarnock and Ayr	5th (City of Glasgow) Bn, The Highland Light Infantry, at Hill Street in Glasgow	4th (Border) Bn, The King's Own Scottish Borderers, at Galashiels	5th/8th Bn, The Cameronians (Scottish Rifles), at West Princes Street and Cathedral Street in Glasgow
6th Bn, The Royal Scots, at Gilmore Place in Edinburgh (Transferred to Royal Garrison Artillery)		6th (City of Glasgow) Bn, The Highland Light Infantry, at Yorkhill Street in Glasgow	5th (Dumfries & Galloway) Bn, The King's Own Scottish Borderers at Dumfries	6th Bn, The Cameronians (Scottish Rifles), at Muirhall in Hamilton
7th/9th (Highlanders) Bn, The Royal Scots, at Dalmeny Street in Leith and East Claremont Street in Edinburgh		7th (The Blythswood) Bn, The Highland Light Infantry, at Bridgeton in Glasgow (Transferred to Royal Artillery in 1938)		7th Bn, The Cameronians (Scottish Rifles), at Victoria Road, Pollokshaws in Glasgow
8th Bn, The Royal Scots, in Haddington (Transferred to Royal Garrison Artillery)		9th (Glasgow Highland) Bn, The Highland Light Infantry, at Greendyke Street in Glasgow		

In 1939 the 52nd (Lowland) Division was instructed to form a duplicate division as a second-line, as part of rearmament efforts. The duplicate division of the 52nd Lowland Division was entitled the 15th (Scottish) Division and consisted of newly raised Lowland TA Infantry Battalions. Both Divisions were mobilised on the outbreak of the Second World War.

The 52nd (Lowland) Division became the only completely Territorial Division to fight in the Second World War. The Division was initially part of the ill-fated Second British Expeditionary Force (BEF) landed in France in June 1940 under Field Marshal Alan Brooke, later being evacuated from the continent during Operation Aerial. Members of the 52nd at the time included the future Brigadier, Alastair Pearson.

It subsequently trained as a mountain warfare division in the Scottish Highlands under General Sir Neil Ritchie. As the invasion of Normandy approached, the 52nd (Lowland) Division were involved in an elaborate deception plan, Operation Fortitude, designed to deceive the Germans into believing that there would not be one invasion area but several, and that the 52nd would have formed the nexus of a strong force that was to be landed in Norway. As a mountain warfare formation, it had little heavy equipment and transport, and therefore was optimal for conversion to operations as an Airborne force, being assigned to the First Allied Airborne Army. It was in this role that the division was anticipated to take part in Operation Market Garden. Instead the division was reassigned to the First Canadian Army, eventually landing at Ostend in October 1944, as part of the wider Allied advance from Paris to the Rhine.

They were ordered to capture the vital Port of Antwerp and as a result were involved in the Battle of the Scheldt in Belgium and the Netherlands, which included Operation Vitality, Operation Infatuate and the ultimate capture of Walcheren Island, in order to open the mouth of the Scheldt estuary to Allied shipping.

In January 1945 they participated in the Battle for the Roer Triangle, which involved the clearance of the area between the rivers Meuse and Roer. It was during this operation that Dennis Donnini of the 4/5th Battalion, Royal Scots Fusiliers, was awarded the Victoria Cross, becoming the youngest winner of the VC during World War II. The division crossed the River Rhine at Xanten on 24 March 1945, eventually advancing as far as Bremen, where it fought its last battle of the war.

=== Post-war restructuring and Cold War ===
In August 1946 the 52nd (Lowland) Division was disbanded at Oldenburg. Shortly afterwards however the formation was revived as part of the 51st/52nd (Scottish) Division, created via an amalgamation with the 51st (Highland) Division. They once again became a Territorial Division upon demobilisation in 1948.

The Royal Scots (TA Battalions), c. 1947	The Royal Scots Fusiliers (TA Battalions), c. 1947	The Highland Light Infantry (TA Battalions), c. 1947	The King's Own Scottish Borderers (TA Battalions), c. 1947	The Cameronians (Scottish Rifles) (TA Battalions), c. 1947
7th/9th (Highlanders) Bn, The Royal Scots, at Dalmeny Street in Leith and East Claremont Street in Edinburgh	4th/5th Bn, The Royal Scots Fusiliers, in Kilmarnock, Ayr and Cumnock	5th/6th (City of Glasgow) Bn, The Highland Light Infantry, at Hill Street in Glasgow	4th (Border) Bn, The King's Own Scottish Borderers, at Galashiels, Melrose, Hawick, Selkirk and Duns	6th Bn, The Cameronians (Scottish Rifles), at Hamilton, Motherwell, Bothwell and Wishaw
8th (Lothians and Peeblesshire) Bn, The Royal Scots, in Haddington, Midlothian and Peebles		9th (Glasgow Highland) Bn, The Highland Light Infantry, at Maryhill in Glasgow	5th (Dumfries & Galloway) Bn, The King's Own Scottish Borderers, at Dumfries, Stranraer, Castle Douglas and Sanqhar	7th Bn, The Cameronians (Scottish Rifles), at Victoria Road, Pollokshaws in Glasgow

In 1950, the 51st/52nd (Scottish) Division was split, restoring the independence of the 52nd Lowland Division, which took regional command of Territorial Army units based in the Scottish Lowlands, including the TA infantry battalions of the Lowland Brigade regiments.

British forces contracted dramatically as the end of National Service took place in 1960, as announced in the 1957 Defence White Paper. As a result, on 20 July 1960, a reorganisation of the TA was announced by the War Office.

The Royal Scots (TA Battalions), c. 1961	The Royal Highland Fusiliers (TA Battalions), c. 1961	The King's Own Scottish Borderers (TA Battalions), c. 1961	The Cameronians (Scottish Rifles) (TA Battalions), c. 1961
8th/9th Bn, The Royal Scots, at Dalmeny Street in Leith, East Claremont Street in Edinburgh, Tranent, Haddington, Broxburn, Bathgate, Penicuik, Dalkeith and Peebles	4th/5th Bn, The Royal Scots Fusiliers, in Kilmarnock, Ayr and Cumnock	4th/5th Bn, The King's Own Scottish Borderers, at Galashiels	6th/7th Bn, The Cameronians (Scottish Rifles), at Hamilton, Motherwell, Bothwell and Wishaw and Victoria Road, Pollokshaws in Glasgow
	5th/6th (City of Glasgow) Bn, The Highland Light Infantry, at Hill Street in Glasgow		
	1st Glasgow Highlanders Bn, The Highland Light Infantry, at Maryhill in Glasgow		

=== The 1966 Defence White Paper and after ===
This was followed by complete reorganisation as announced in the 1966 Defence White Paper. A comprehensive reorganisation of the reserve forces took place, with the Territorial Army being disbanded and the Territorial & Army Volunteer Reserve (TAVR) was formed on 1 April 1967. Instead of forming large reserve formations, the role of the new TAVR was to provide smaller sub-unit-sized reinforcements for the Regular Army via a multi-tier system established to meet the NATO reserve (TAVR II) and Home Defence (TAVR III) requirements.

The Territorial Battalions within the four regiments of the Lowland Brigade were significantly reduced from full Battalions to Company strength cadres, with three new reserve Battalions raised to incorporate them. These three units were; The 52nd Lowland Volunteers, which was a TAVR II unit with a NATO reserve role, and both the 3rd (Territorial) Battalion, The Royal Highland Fusiliers and The Royal Scots and Cameronians Territorials, which were TAVR III units with responsibility for Home Defence.

The 52nd Lowland Division was also reduced to a brigade sized formation and the three new Lowland Territorial Battalions came under the command of what would become 52nd Lowland Brigade, within Scotland District (which was later absorbed into the 2nd Division in 1998).

52nd Lowland Volunteers (TAVR II), c. 1967

- HQ (Glasgow Highlanders) Company at Maryhill in Glasgow
- A (Royal Scots) Company at Edinburgh and Bathgate
- B (Royal Scots Fusiliers) Company at Ayr
- C (The Kings Own Scottish Borderers) Company at Dumfries and Galashiels
- D (Cameronians) Company at Hamilton
- E (Highland Light Infantry) Company at Maryhill in Glasgow

3rd (Territorial) Battalion, The Royal Highland Fusiliers (TAVR III), c. 1967

- HQ (Royal Scots Fusiliers) Company at Ayr
- A (Royal Scots Fusiliers) Company at Ayr
- B (Highland Light Infantry) Company at Victoria Road, Pollokshaws in Glasgow
- C (Glasgow Highlanders) Company at Maryhill, Glasgow

The Royal Scots and Cameronians Territorials (TAVR III), c. 1967

- HQ (Royal Scots) Company at Edinburgh
- A (Royal Scots) Company at Bathgate
- B (Cameronians) Company at Hamilton

The TAVR III units were effectively disbanded in 1969, with the two Battalions being reduced to Section-sized "cadres". The cadres became part of the 52nd Lowland Volunteers, although continuing to wear the badges and perpetuating the traditions of their forebears. An increase in the size of the TAVR in 1971 however lead to an expansion in the size of the Royal Scots and Cameronians Territorials and the 3rd (Territorial) Battalion, The Royal Highland Fusiliers cadres, which were amalgamated and became the separate 2nd Battalion, 52nd Lowland Volunteers (2/52 LOWLAND) in 1971.

1st Battalion, 52nd Lowland Volunteers (1/52 LOWLAND), c. 1971

- HQ (Glasgow Highlanders) Company at Maryhill, Glasgow
- A (Royal Scots) Company at Edinburgh and Bathgate (Transferred to 2/52 Lowland in 1982)
- B (Royal Scots Fusiliers) Company at Ayr
- C (The Kings Own Scottish Borderers) Company at Dumfries
- D (Cameronians) Company at Hamilton
- E (Highland Light Infantry) Company at Maryhill, Glasgow

2nd Battalion, 52nd Lowland Volunteers (2/52 LOWLAND), c. 1971

- HQ (Royal Scots) Company at Edinburgh
- No.1 (Royal Scots) Company at Penicuik
- No.2 (Royal Highland Fusiliers) Company at Auldhouse Road, Pollokshaws (Assaye House at Shawfield, Rutherglen from 1982, becoming A Coy in 1/52 Lowland).
- No.3 (Kings Own Scottish Borderers) at Galashiels
- No.4 (Cameronians) Company at Motherwell

In 1982, the TAVR reverted to the old title of the Territorial Army, with the Order of Battle being subject to minor reorganisation, with the 1st Battalion transferring A (Royal Scots) Company to the 2nd Battalion and the 2nd Battalion transferring its No.2 (Royal Highland Fusiliers) Company to the 1st Battalion.

Throughout the remainder of the Cold War, the 1st Battalion of 52nd Lowland Volunteers, now based entirely in Glasgow and the West of Scotland, and the 2nd Battalion, based primarily in Edinburgh, the Lothians and Borders, trained for the NATO reinforcement role, with 1/52 LOWLAND's MILAN anti-tank missile platoon having a war role with the British Army of the Rhine in Germany. In 1984 however, the 1st Battalion also raised two Home Service Force companies and the 2nd Battalion raised a further one, which trained exclusively for the home defence role, they were eventually disbanded in 1992 as part of Options for Change. The 1st Battalion also had its D (Cameronians) Company disbanded and the 2nd Battalion had its No.1 (Royal Scots) Company disbanded.

=== Post-Cold War era ===
Following the Front Line First reforms of the British Army in 1994, the 1st Battalion, 52nd Lowland Volunteers was incorporated into the Royal Highland Fusiliers and as a result, was retitled the 3rd (Volunteer) Battalion, The Royal Highland Fusiliers (3 RHF) in 1995. The 2nd Battalion of 52nd Lowland Volunteers, remained a standalone multi cap-badged Battalion, and was simply known as The Lowland Volunteers (LOWLAND).

3rd (Volunteer) Battalion, The Royal Highland Fusiliers (3 RHF), c. 1995

- HQ Company at Maryhill, Glasgow
- A Company at Rutherglen
- B Company at Ayr
- C Company at Maryhill, Glasgow

The Lowland Volunteers (LOWLAND), c. 1995

- HQ (Royal Scots) Company at Edinburgh
- B (Kings Own Scottish Borderers) Company at Galashiels
- C (Kings Own Scottish Borderers) Company at Dumfries
- D (Cameronians/Royal Scots) Company at Motherwell and Bathgate

In 1999, as a result of the Strategic Defence Review of Britain's armed forces, the two Battalions were re-amalgamated to take the name and single battalion form of The 52nd Lowland Regiment (52 LOWLAND). This saw an overall reduction in strength from eight companies in two battalions to five companies in one battalion, although the unit continued to maintain both stands of Colours of the 1st and 2nd Battalions of the 52nd Lowland Volunteers until July 2011. In 2002, the 52nd Lowland Regiment was transferred from the operational command of the 52nd Lowland Brigade to 51st (Scottish) Brigade, which took command of all Scottish TA units.

52nd Lowland Regiment (52 LOWLAND), c. 1999

- HQ (Royal Highland Fusiliers) Company at Maryhill, Glasgow
- A (Royal Scots) Company at Edinburgh and Bathgate
- B (Royal Highland Fusiliers) Company at Ayr
- C (Royal Highland Fusiliers) Company at Maryhill, Glasgow and Motherwell
- D (Kings Own Scottish Borderers) Company at Galashiels and Dumfries (Mortar Platoon at Dumfries transferred to B Coy in 2001, retaining KOSB affiliation)

As part of the Delivering Security in a Changing World Review of the Armed Forces, the 52nd Lowland Regiment was amalgamated with the other Regiments of the Scottish Division to become 52nd Lowland, 6th Battalion, The Royal Regiment of Scotland, which was formed on 28 March 2006. There was also further consolidation of sub-units, with D (King's Own Scottish Borderers) Company, based in Galashiels, amalgamating with A (Royal Scots) Company, to reflect the formation of the regular Royal Scots Borderers.

== Current locations and operations ==
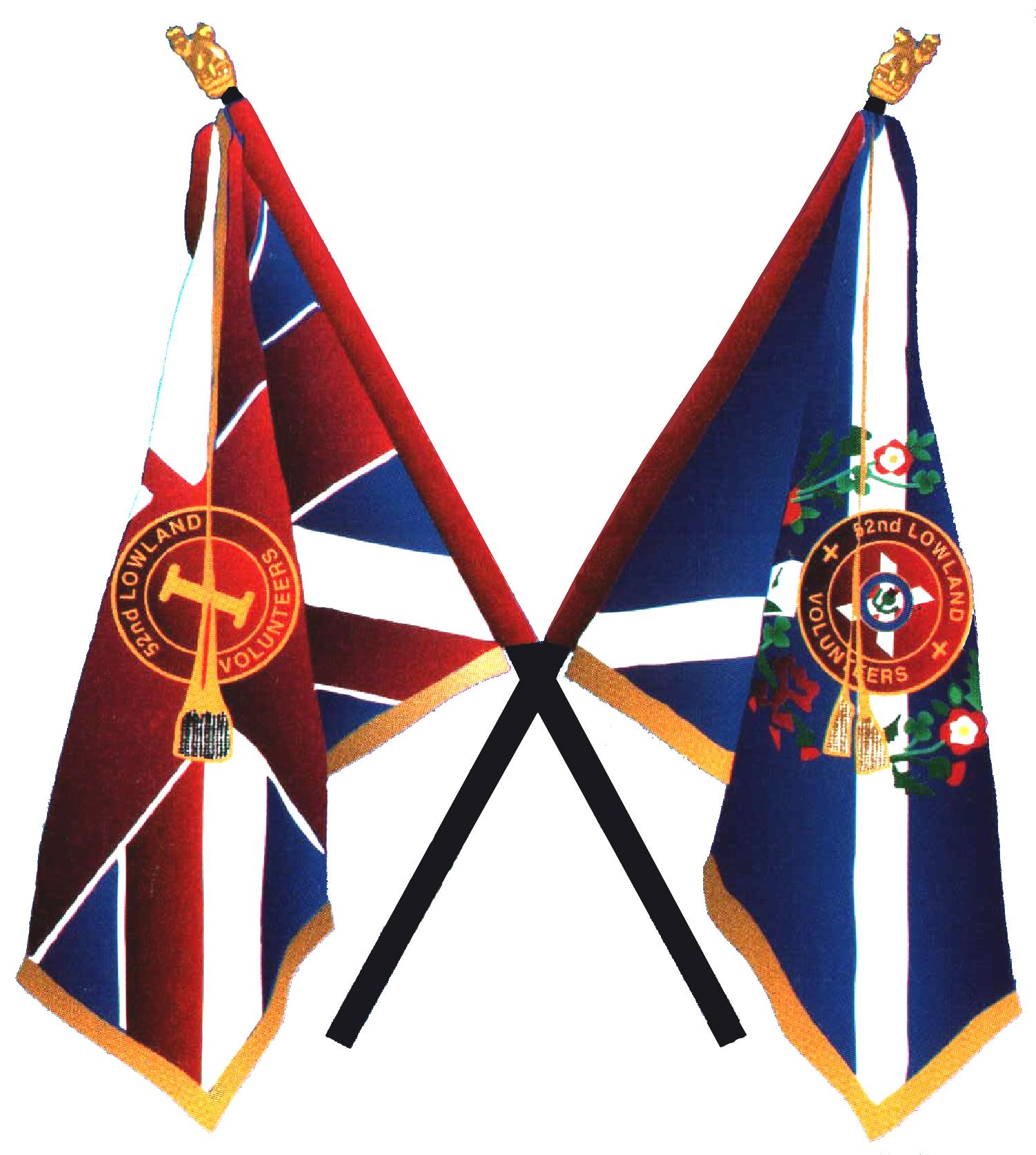
Two stands of Colours were carried by 52nd Lowland, 6th Battalion, The Royal Regiment of Scotland until the presentation of new colours by The Princess Royal in May 2010 and again by The Queen at Holyrood Park in July 2011. The previous colours were inherited from the 1st and 2nd Battalions of the 52nd Lowland Volunteers. The colours were first presented in 1985 by The Princess Margaret. The Queen's Colours are based on the Union Flag and the Regimental Colours upon The Saltire.

=== Order of battle ===
The Battalion Headquarters is based at Walcheren Barracks in Maryhill, Glasgow and the Battalion currently has one Support Company and three Rifle Companies, which also incorporate various Support Weapons platoons, based throughout the Scottish Lowlands:

52nd Lowland, 6th Battalion, The Royal Regiment of Scotland (6 SCOTS), c. 2020

- Battalion HQ & HQ (Royal Highland Fusiliers) Company based at Walcheren Barracks, Glasgow
- A (Royal Scots Borderers) Company based in Edinburgh/Galashiels/Bathgate
- B (Royal Highland Fusiliers) Company based in Ayr/Dumfries
- C (Royal Highland Fusiliers) Company based in Glasgow/Motherwell

Its members formerly wore a black or white hackle on their Tam o' Shanters, the same as those worn by the 1st and 2nd Battalions respectively. In August 2010, the Battalion adopted a new grey hackle to distinguish it within the Royal Regiment of Scotland.

In the past, Headquarter Company of the 1st Battalion, 52nd Lowland Volunteers maintained the direct lineage of the Glasgow Highlanders but rebadged as Royal Highland Fusiliers in 1973. D Company of the Lowland Volunteers also maintained the name and lineage of the Cameronians, however it changed its affiliation to the King's Own Scottish Borderers in 1997.

=== Ceremonial ===
In ceremonial duties, the Battalion has a military band, The Lowland Band of the Royal Regiment of Scotland, formerly the Royal Scots Territorial Band. The 52nd Lowland Regiment also maintained a Pipes and Drums, which from 2002 was under the direction of Pipe Major Gordon Walker, who was formerly a regular piper in the Royal Highland Fusiliers and an instructor at both the Army School of Bagpipe Music and Highland Drumming and the College of Piping. The 52nd Lowland Pipes and Drums were very successful during a period of five years, becoming the best Pipe Band in the British Army at the time, reaching Grade Two of the World Pipe Band Championships. In 2007, owing to administrative constraints, the band opted to move en masse into civilian ranks and are now known as The Mauchline & District Caledonia Pipe Band.

The Lowland Band continues to take part in military and civilian events all over the UK and the world on behalf of 6 SCOTS and the Royal Regiment of Scotland, including the Battalion's annual Beating Retreat and Remembrance Day ceremonies in George Square, the Edinburgh Military Tattoo and the Opening of the Scottish Parliament. In August 2009 the Lowland Band was joined by the Combined Scottish Universities Officers Training Corps Pipes and Drums in an exercise to Ottawa, Canada where they participated in Fortissimo 2009 and the Changing the Guard by the Canadian Ceremonial Guard.

=== Training ===
The majority of soldiers and officers in the battalion are part-time members with other full-time civilian careers or are in further or higher education. They train and acquire military skills in their spare-time during evening, weekend and holiday periods. Many members are entitled to special leave from their employer to train with the battalion. They are supported by a small number of full-time TA Non Regular Permanent Staff, regular army Permanent Staff Instructors and civilian administrative staff. Each member of the Battalion has a minimum commitment to serve 27 training days per annum, which normally includes a two-week-long annual camp in the UK or overseas, as well as regular weekly training evenings and monthly weekend training exercises in locations throughout Scotland such as Garelochhead, Barry Buddon and Kirkcudbright.

After the SDR New Chapter was published in 2001, the Battalion took on an additional formal domestic role as the mainstay of 51st (Scottish) Brigade's Civil Contingency Reaction Force (CCRF) in the Scottish Lowlands, which entails the provision of ad hoc support to the emergency services if required. The Battalion's Area of Responsibility is contiguous with that of the Lothian and Borders Police, Dumfries and Galloway Constabulary and Southern divisions of Strathclyde Police.

=== Operations ===
The Battalion's primary operational role is to provide reserve contingents to augment its two affiliated regular Battalions and the wider Royal Regiment of Scotland during any Large Scale Deliberate Intervention (LSDI) Operations. Many members routinely volunteer to serve individually alongside their affiliated regular Battalions or as part of Territorial composite sub-unit formations of up to company-sized strength on exercise and operations all over the world, including Cyprus, Bosnia, Kosovo, Northern Ireland and, most recently, on Operation Herrick in Afghanistan and Operation Telic in Iraq, especially on TELIC II and TELIC IV, the former on which two fatalities were suffered in 2003, whilst attached to the King's Own Scottish Borderers. 52nd Lowland Regiment was also noted for its involvement in the defence of CIMIC-House in Al Amarah during August 2004.

Most operational deployments are for a fixed six-month roulement, although when pre-deployment training and post operational leave are taken into account, members can be away from their work and families for up to ten months. Members of the TA can be mobilised for overseas operations in this way once every three years, although it is rarely more often than once every five years, under the terms of the Reserve Forces Act 1996.

From August 2007 until February 2008, 52nd Lowland deployed Bremen Platoon, a composite Force protection formation in support of 151st Transport Regiment, based at HQ ISAF, in the Kabul area of Afghanistan, as part of Operation Herrick VII, on a 6-month Roulement. This was the first complete 52nd Lowland sub-unit formation deployed since the Second World War and the platoon received a commendation from ISAF commander General McNeill.

The battalion continues to contribute volunteer reservists in order to sustain the regular Royal Regiment of Scotland's and wider British Army's overseas operational deployments, with some elements of the Battalion also volunteering to deploy on Operation Tosca as part of the United Nations Peacekeeping Force in Cyprus in 2008 and as part of the 3 SCOTS battlegroup on Operation Herrick X from April 2009.

== Lineage ==
Lineage
52nd Lowland, 6th Battalion, The Royal Regiment of Scotland	52nd Lowland Regiment	3rd (Volunteer) Battalion, The Royal Highland Fusiliers	1st Battalion, 52nd Lowland Volunteers	52nd Lowland Volunteers (TAVR II)	8th/9th Battalion, Royal Scots
52nd Lowland, 6th Battalion, The Royal Regiment of Scotland	52nd Lowland Regiment	3rd (Volunteer) Battalion, The Royal Highland Fusiliers	1st Battalion, 52nd Lowland Volunteers	52nd Lowland Volunteers (TAVR II)	4th/5th Battalion, Royal Scots Fusiliers
52nd Lowland, 6th Battalion, The Royal Regiment of Scotland	52nd Lowland Regiment	3rd (Volunteer) Battalion, The Royal Highland Fusiliers	1st Battalion, 52nd Lowland Volunteers	52nd Lowland Volunteers (TAVR II)	5th/6th Battalion, Highland Light Infantry
52nd Lowland, 6th Battalion, The Royal Regiment of Scotland	52nd Lowland Regiment	The Lowland Volunteers	2nd Battalion, 52nd Lowland Volunteers	3rd (Territorial) Battalion, The Royal Highland Fusiliers (TAVR III)	1st Glasgow Highlanders Battalion, The Highland Light Infantry
52nd Lowland, 6th Battalion, The Royal Regiment of Scotland	52nd Lowland Regiment	The Lowland Volunteers	2nd Battalion, 52nd Lowland Volunteers	3rd (Territorial) Battalion, The Royal Highland Fusiliers (TAVR III)	4th/5th Battalion, King's Own Scottish Borderers
52nd Lowland, 6th Battalion, The Royal Regiment of Scotland	52nd Lowland Regiment	The Lowland Volunteers	2nd Battalion, 52nd Lowland Volunteers	The Royal Scots and Cameronians Territorials (TAVR III)	6th/7th Battalion, Cameronians (Scottish Rifles)

== Alliances ==
- South Africa – Chief Maqoma Regiment
- South Africa – Bambatha Rifles
- Canada – The Royal Highland Fusiliers of Canada
- Canada – The Canadian Scottish Regiment (Princess Mary's)
- Canada – Royal Newfoundland Regiment
- Canada – 1st Battalion, The Royal New Brunswick Regiment (Carleton and York)
- Australia – 25th/49th Battalion, The Royal Queensland Regiment

== See also ==
- Armed forces in Scotland
- Military history of Scotland
