= NRPS =

NRPS may refer to:

- New Riders of the Purple Sage
- Niagara Regional Police Service
- Non Regular Permanent Staff
- Non-Ribosomal Peptide Synthetase
