= Thomas Noble =

Thomas Noble may refer to:

- Thomas Noble (MP) (1656–1730), British politician
- Thomas Noble (poet) (1772–1837), English poet
- Thomas Satterwhite Noble (1835–1907), American painter
- T. Tertius Noble (1867–1953), English-born organist and composer in the United States
- Thomas Paterson Noble (1887–1959), Scottish surgeon
- Tommy Noble (1897–1966), British boxer
