= Maryhill Barracks =

Former barracks in Glasgow, Scotland

- Glasgow
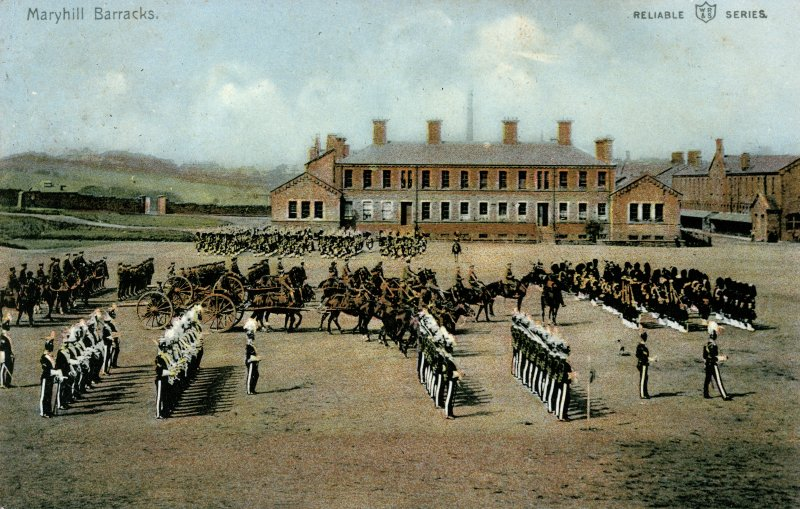
- Maryhill Barracks

Site information
- Type: Barracks
- Owner: Ministry of Defence
- Operator: British Army

Location
- Location within Glasgow
- Coordinates: 55°53′20″N 04°17′18″W

Site history
- Built: 1872
- Built for: War Office
- In use: 1872-1959

Maryhill Barracks was built on 12 hectares (30 acres) of the Ruchill estate, in the Maryhill area of northern Glasgow, Scotland.

== History ==
The barracks were opened as Garrioch Barracks in 1872. Built to accommodate an infantry regiment, a squadron of cavalry and a battery of field artillery, it dominated the area which is now the Wyndford housing estate. The barracks replaced the previous Infantry Barracks at Duke Street in the East End of the city.

Glasgow City Corporation had been petitioning the government since the early 19th century for more military protection from their fear of "riot and tumult" in the growing industrial city. Despite the fact that Maryhill at the time was an independent burgh, it agreed to the erection of Glasgow's new barracks, with the greatly enlarged complex opening in 1876. Higher quality than normal, the barracks engendered a sense of community. The Glasgow Soldiers' Home, where those on leave could entertain relatives, and public houses with names such as the Highland Light Infantry (HLI) and the Elephant and Bugle (the HLI emblem) gave Maryhill the feel of a garrison town. Vandalism was also reduced. Married quarters were added to the barracks in 1911.

During the 1919 40-hours general strike in Glasgow, the soldiers at Maryhill Barracks were deemed to be unreliable and were confined to barracks while troops from elsewhere were brought in to re-impose order. It was in 1919 that Maryhill Barracks was used as a marshalling place for the Argyll and Sutherland Highlanders before embarking for India. Maryhill Barracks became the depot of the Highland Light Infantry (City of Glasgow) regiment in March 1921.

In May 1934 a bomb exploded in the barracks, which was alleged to have been set off by the same person as bombed the Army Recruiting Offices, 139 Bath Street, a fortnight previously.

It was also home to the Scots Greys and famously held Adolf Hitler's second-in-command Rudolf Hess during the Second World War after his supposed "Peace" flight to the UK in 1941, at a time when it was used as a prisoner of war camp. In 1942, the Free French leader, General Charles de Gaulle, visited French troops there.

The barracks were decommissioned in 1959 after the amalgamation of the Highland Light Infantry into the Royal Highland Fusiliers and were largely demolished in 1961, then transferred to Glasgow Corporation for the development of the Wyndford housing estate, although the guardroom and boundary walls remain. A Territorial Army unit, the 52nd Lowland, 6th Battalion, The Royal Regiment of Scotland, continues to be based at the adjacent Walcheren Barracks.
