= Loreburn Hall =

- Dumfries, Scotland
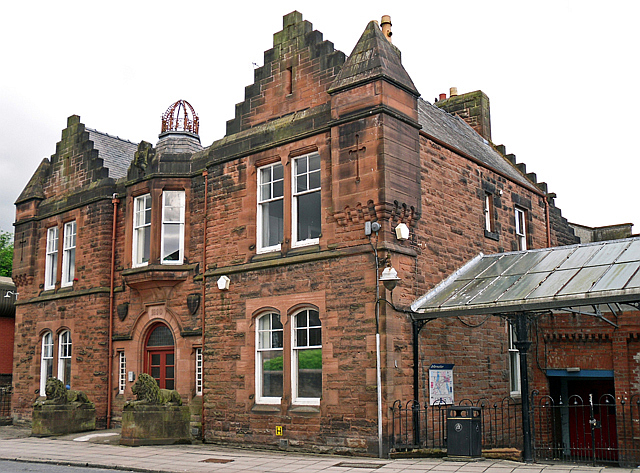

Site information
- Type: Drill hall

Location
- Location in Dumfries and Galloway
- Coordinates: 55.07021°N 3.60789°W

Site history
- Built: 1890
- Built for: War Office
- Architect: Alan Burgess Crombie
- In use: 1890 - 1961

The Loreburn Hall is a military installation in Dumfries, Scotland.

== History ==
The building was designed by Alan Burgess Crombie as the headquarters of the 3rd (Dumfries) Volunteer Battalion, The King's Own Scottish Borderers and completed in 1890. This unit evolved to become the 5th Battalion, the King's Own Scottish Borderers in 1908. The battalion was mobilised at the drill hall in August 1914 before being deployed to Gallipoli and then to the Western Front.

The 4th and 5th battalions amalgamated to form the 4th/5th Battalion, with its headquarters at the Paton Street drill hall in Galashiels in 1961. Loreburn Hall then became surplus to requirements and ownership was transferred to Dumfries Council in 1968.

The Council used the drill hall as a venue for concerts by performers such as Black Sabbath and Big Country and for sporting events such as wrestling. In 2014, the drill hall was given a new lease of life as a temporary gym and sports facility when the newly built DG One Leisure Centre was found to be so full of building defects it had to be closed for a major rebuilding program.
