= List of listed buildings in Galashiels, Scottish Borders =

This is a list of listed buildings in the parish of Galashiels in the Scottish Borders, Scotland.

== List ==
Name	Location	Date listed	Geo-coordinates	Notes	Category	LB number	Image
Abbotsford Road, Aisle And Tombstones Including Graveyard, Boundary Walls And Gates			55°36′44″N 2°48′15″W		B	31971	Upload another image
Cornmill Square, Monument To Sir Walter Scott			55°36′54″N 2°48′26″W		C(S)	31980	Upload another image See more images
Dale Street, Netherdale Mill			55°36′32″N 2°47′07″W		B	31983	Upload Photo
Abbotsford Road And Parsonage Road, St Peter's Episcopal Church With Boundary Walls And Railings			55°36′40″N 2°48′09″W		C(S)	31988	Upload Photo
119-153 (Odd Nos) High Street And 1-5 (Odd Nos) Roxburgh Street (Former Co-Operative Department Store)			55°37′07″N 2°48′44″W		C(S)	31991	Upload Photo
22 High Street And 1 Sime Place, The Harrow Inn And Ancillary Building			55°37′03″N 2°48′36″W		C(S)	31993	Upload another image See more images
40 Abbotsford Road And Hayward Drive, Binniemyre, With Garden Features And Boundary Walls			55°36′25″N 2°47′45″W		C(S)	32006	Upload Photo
Lindean Cottages And Smithy			55°34′21″N 2°49′10″W		C(S)	6735	Upload Photo
Gala Park, Burgh Primary School, (Formerly Burgh School) Ancillary Structures, Boundary Walls, Steps, Railings And Lamp Standards			55°36′31″N 2°46′13″W		C(S)	50230	Upload Photo
23 And 23A Abbotsford Road, Pollenca, With Boundary Walls			55°36′36″N 2°47′56″W		C(S)	50655	Upload Photo
62 Bank Street, Corner House			55°36′54″N 2°48′23″W		C(S)	50670	Upload Photo
Bridge Street, Saint Andrew's Arts Centre (Former Ladhope Free Church And Halls), With Railings, Gates And Gatepiers			55°37′05″N 2°48′33″W		C(S)	50677	Upload Photo
Galafoot Road, Galafoot Waste Water Treatment Plant, Galafoot House (Power House), Laboratory And Office Block And Ancillary Buildings			55°36′24″N 2°46′33″W		C(S)	50689	Upload Photo
Galafoot, Railway Viaduct Over Tweed			55°36′31″N 2°46′13″W		B	50690	Upload Photo
Huddersfield Street, Gala Mill			55°36′42″N 2°47′52″W		B	50696	Upload Photo
Market Street, Anderson's Chambers With Gate, Gatepiers And Railings			55°36′58″N 2°48′16″W		C(S)	50707	Upload Photo
Nether Road, Gala Fairydean Football Stadium			55°36′23″N 2°47′03″W		A	50711	Upload another image See more images
Nethernbarns Farmhouse, Steading And Stable Cottage			55°36′00″N 2°47′28″W		C(S)	50712	Upload Photo
Roxburgh Street And Botany Lane, Morrison And Murray Engineering Works			55°37′06″N 2°48′46″W		C(S)	50716	Upload Photo
Scott Crescent, Galashiels Bowling Club And Boundary Walls			55°36′51″N 2°48′33″W		C(S)	50717	Upload Photo
St John Street, Hayward Hall			55°36′53″N 2°48′31″W		C(S)	50718	Upload Photo
1, 3, 5, 7, 9 And 11 Tea Street And Including Boundary Walls			55°36′44″N 2°48′24″W		C(S)	31975	Upload Photo
49-57 (Odd Nos), Channel Street And Douglas Bridge, Former Douglas Hotel			55°37′00″N 2°48′26″W		C(S)	31996	Upload Photo
Abbotsford Road, Brunswickhill, Including Conservatory, Grotto, Game Store, Gate Piers And Boundary Walls			55°36′04″N 2°47′36″W		B	32005	Upload Photo
4 And 6 Abbotsford Road, Scottish Borders Council Social Work Department (Former St Peters School And Schoolhouse) And Including Boundary Walls, Rialings And Former Playground			55°36′41″N 2°48′09″W		C(S)	50656	Upload Photo
10 Abbotsford Road, Former St Peter's Hall Including Boundary Walls			55°36′40″N 2°48′11″W		C(S)	50657	Upload Photo
35 Bank Street, Royal Bank Of Scotland			55°36′57″N 2°48′28″W		B	50662	Upload another image
57 And 58 Bank Street, The Auld Mill Inn, Public House			55°36′54″N 2°48′23″W		C(S)	50665	Upload another image
Kirk Brae, Rowantree Butts, Including Coach House, Greenhouse, Summerhouse, Boundary Walls And Railings			55°37′11″N 2°49′04″W		C(S)	50698	Upload Photo
69-77 (Inclusive) Kirk Brae Including Boundary Walls, Steps, Walkways And Railings			55°37′07″N 2°48′55″W		C(S)	50699	Upload Photo
Ladhope Vale, Former Ladhope Parish Church Hall			55°37′07″N 2°48′32″W		C(S)	50701	Upload Photo
Netherdale, Galamoor House			55°36′29″N 2°47′16″W		C(S)	50713	Upload Photo
Scott Crescent, Old Gala House Including Boundary Walls			55°36′50″N 2°48′31″W		A	31973	Upload another image
Albert Place, Burgh Chambers And Clock Tower, Including War Memorials, Balustrading And Steps			55°36′52″N 2°48′23″W		B	31977	Upload another image
High Street, Trinity Church And Halls (Church Of Scotland)			55°37′04″N 2°48′38″W		B	31990	Upload Photo
56 Abbotsford Road, Abbotshill With Boundary Walls And Garden Features			55°36′17″N 2°47′31″W		B	32001	Upload Photo
Windyknowe Road, Woodlands House Including Boundary Walls			55°37′10″N 2°49′10″W		A	32002	Upload Photo
Windyknowe Road, Woodlands Gatelodge, Former Coach House And Rose Cottage Including Entrance Gateway			55°37′08″N 2°49′07″W		C(S)	32003	Upload Photo
12, 14 Roxburgh Street And Union Street, Former Workshop And House, With Boundary Walls			55°37′07″N 2°48′48″W		C(S)	32008	Upload Photo
Edinburgh Road, Buckholmburn House With Boundary Wall			55°37′41″N 2°49′40″W		C(S)	50229	Upload Photo
17 Abbotsford Road, Willowbush, With Boundary Walls			55°36′39″N 2°48′01″W		B	50654	Upload Photo
28 And 29 Bank Street, Including Single Storey Extension To Rear			55°36′58″N 2°48′29″W		C(S)	50666	Upload Photo
23 Bridge Street, Former Hand Loom Shop, Including Boundary Wall To SE			55°37′07″N 2°48′39″W		B	50678	Upload Photo
Gala Park, St Aidans Church (Former United Presbyterian), Church Hall And Boundary Walls			55°36′56″N 2°48′35″W		B	50686	Upload Photo
36 And 38 Gala Park			55°36′56″N 2°48′35″W		C(S)	50687	Upload Photo
67 Gala Park, Former Schoolhouse, Boundary Walls And Railings			55°37′00″N 2°48′41″W		C(S)	50688	Upload Photo
17-21 (Odd Nos) High Street			55°37′02″N 2°48′36″W		C(S)	50691	Upload Photo
112 High Street, Public House (Former Royal Bank Of Scotland)			55°37′08″N 2°48′42″W		C(S)	50695	Upload Photo
King Street, Former Tweed Mill, Main Range And The Pirns			55°37′23″N 2°49′24″W		C(S)	50697	Upload Photo
Melrose Road, Thorniedean House Including Boundary Walls, Railings And Gatepiers			55°36′55″N 2°47′55″W		C(S)	50710	Upload Photo
Roxburgh Street, Botany Mill, High Mill			55°37′05″N 2°48′48″W		C(S)	50715	Upload Photo
St John's Street, Volunteer Hall, Boundary Wall And Railings			55°36′54″N 2°48′28″W		C(S)	50720	Upload another image
23 Scott Crescent, The Hall (The Old Cloth Hall) Including Boundary Walls And Gateway			55°36′46″N 2°48′26″W		C(S)	31974	Upload Photo
Scott Crescent, Scott Park Gate Lodge, Gatepiers, Gates And Boundary Walls			55°36′51″N 2°48′38″W		C(S)	31986	Upload Photo
46, 48 High Street, Former Bank			55°37′04″N 2°48′37″W		C(S)	31992	Upload Photo
Selkirk Road Kingsknowes Hotel Including Conservatory			55°36′16″N 2°37′30″W		A	31999	Upload Photo
42 Bank Street (Former Liberal Club)			55°36′56″N 2°48′26″W		C(S)	50668	Upload another image
47 And 49 Ladhope Vale, Ladhope Centre (Former Border Textile And Engineering Supplies Company) With Boundary Wall			55°37′05″N 2°48′25″W		C(S)	50705	Upload Photo
56 Market Street, King's Hotel			55°36′58″N 2°48′21″W		C(S)	50708	Upload Photo
Meigle Hill, Reservoir And Circular Tank			55°37′15″N 2°49′37″W		C(S)	50709	Upload Photo
Cornmill Square, Equestrian Statue Of A Border Reiver			55°36′52″N 2°48′24″W		B	31978	Upload another image
Cornmill Square, Fountain			55°36′53″N 2°48′25″W		B	31981	Upload another image
Scott Crescent, Old Parish And St Pauls Church, (Church Of Scotland) Church Hall Including Boundary Walls			55°36′46″N 2°48′30″W		B	31987	Upload Photo
1 Channel Street, Galashiels Post Office			55°37′03″N 2°48′32″W		B	31994	Upload another image
Market Street, Our Lady And St Andrew's Church, (Roman Catholic) And Stirling Street, Catholic Presbytery Including Boundary Walls And Railings			55°37′00″N 2°48′17″W		B	31997	Upload Photo
Botany Lane, Former Glasite Chapel			55°37′05″N 2°48′45″W		B	31998	Upload Photo
Glenmayne House, Near Galashiels			55°35′41″N 2°47′51″W		A	12929	Upload another image
9 Abbotsford Road, Wakefield Bank Including Glasshouse And Boundary Walls			55°36′43″N 2°48′06″W		C(S)	50653	Upload Photo
42 Abbotsford Road, Maplehurst Guesthouse, Including Boundary Walls Gatepiers And Gate Posts			55°36′24″N 2°47′41″W		B	50658	Upload Photo
5-7 (Inclusive Nos) Bank Street			55°37′00″N 2°48′33″W		C(S)	50661	Upload Photo
37, 37A, 38 And 38A Bank Street			55°36′56″N 2°48′27″W		C(S)	50664	Upload another image
Boleside Road, Railway Footbridge			55°36′06″N 2°47′05″W		C(S)	50673	Upload Photo
2 Channel Street And 2-12 (Even Nos) High Street, Victoria Buildings			55°37′01″N 2°48′34″W		C(S)	50679	Upload another image
Edinburgh Road, Bristol Mill			55°37′32″N 2°49′25″W		B	50683	Upload Photo
Ladhope Vale House			55°37′09″N 2°48′37″W		C(S)	50703	Upload Photo
Scott Crescent, Mercat Cross			55°36′46″N 2°48′25″W		C(S)	31972	Upload another image See more images
3, 5, 7 Channel Street, Bank Of Scotland			55°37′02″N 2°48′32″W		C(S)	31995	Upload another image
Barr Road, Galahill House, Including Service Wing			55°36′35″N 2°48′19″W		C(S)	32007	Upload Photo
Faldonside House			55°35′23″N 2°48′04″W		B	8194	Upload Photo
Ettrick Bridge			55°34′27″N 2°49′06″W		B	8196	Upload Photo
22 Abbotsford Road, Rowanlee			55°36′35″N 2°47′59″W		C(S)	47262	Upload Photo
54 Abbotsford Road, Abbotshill Lodge And Gateway			55°36′20″N 2°47′30″W		C(S)	50659	Upload Photo
Barr Road, Old Parish Manse Including Courtyard, Former Stable, Boundary Walls And Gates			55°36′39″N 2°48′17″W		C(S)	50672	Upload Photo
Bridge Street, Scottish Enterprise Borders (Former Maxwell Hotel)			55°37′08″N 2°48′40″W		B	50676	Upload Photo
34 And 46 Channel Street			55°37′01″N 2°48′30″W		C(S)	50681	Upload another image
79 High Street (Former Commercial Bank)			55°37′05″N 2°48′42″W		C(S)	50693	Upload Photo
Ladhope Bridge			55°37′10″N 2°48′39″W		C(S)	50700	Upload Photo
1 Overhaugh Street, Former Salvation Army Citadel			55°37′01″N 2°48′33″W		C(S)	50714	Upload Photo
Tweed Road, Galavale House And Galavale Lodge, (Former Cottage Hospital)			55°36′27″N 2°47′23″W		C(S)	50724	Upload Photo
Tweed Terrace, Lucy Sanderson Cottage Homes And Ida Hayward Cottages			55°36′24″N 2°47′29″W		B	31982	Upload Photo
Lawyers Brae, Public Library And Including Boundary Walls And Railings			55°36′52″N 2°48′26″W		C(S)	31989	Upload another image
Faldonside House, Gate Lodge And Gatepiers			55°35′13″N 2°48′13″W		C(S)	6733	Upload Photo
Cascade			55°35′14″N 2°48′38″W		C(S)	6734	Upload Photo
3 And 5 Albert Place, (Former George Sutherland And Sons Sculptors Yard) Including Boundary Walls, Railings, Gatepiers And Gates			55°36′51″N 2°48′22″W		B	45919	Upload Photo
7 And 9 Bridge Place			55°37′09″N 2°48′42″W		C(S)	50675	Upload Photo
69 High Street, Reivers Pool Hall, (Former Unionist Club)			55°37′04″N 2°48′41″W		C(S)	50692	Upload Photo
81 And 83 High Street			55°37′05″N 2°48′42″W		C(S)	50694	Upload Photo
Lawyer's Brae, Bust Of Robert Burns			55°36′52″N 2°48′25″W		C(S)	31979	Upload another image
52 Abbotsford Road, Abbotsknowe Including Steps, Gatepiers And Boundary Walls			55°36′09″N 2°47′33″W		B	32000	Upload Photo
58, 60 Abbotsford Road, Netherby, Including Lodge, Walled Garden, Boundary Walls And Gatepiers			55°36′13″N 2°47′29″W		B	32004	Upload Photo
Tweed Bridge			55°34′52″N 2°48′48″W		B	8195	Upload Photo
Bank Street Brae, Round Tree Bridge And Commemorative Pillars, Including Railings And Section Of Mill Lade			55°36′58″N 2°48′33″W		C(S)	50660	Upload another image
Ladhope Vale, Riverside House, Former Hand Loom Mill			55°37′07″N 2°48′33″W		C(S)	50704	Upload Photo
Tweed Road, Kingsknowes Lodge Including Entrance Gateway And Garden Walls			55°36′20″N 2°47′07″W		C(S)	50722	Upload Photo

== Key ==
The scheme for classifying buildings in Scotland is:

- Category A: "buildings of national or international importance, either architectural or historic; or fine, little-altered examples of some particular period, style or building type."
- Category B: "buildings of regional or more than local importance; or major examples of some particular period, style or building type, which may have been altered."
- Category C: "buildings of local importance; lesser examples of any period, style, or building type, as originally constructed or moderately altered; and simple traditional buildings which group well with other listed buildings."

In March 2016 there were 47,288 listed buildings in Scotland. Of these, 8% were Category A, and 50% were Category B, with the remaining 42% being Category C.
