= 52nd Regiment of Foot (disambiguation) =

52nd Regiment of Foot may refer to:

- 50th (Queen's Own) Regiment of Foot, raised in 1755 and renumbered as the 50th in 1756
- 52nd (Oxfordshire) Regiment of Foot, raised as the 54th and renumbered in 1756

See also

- 52nd Lowland Regiment, a Territorial Army regiment formed in 1999
