= Wyndford =

Area of Glasgow, Scotland

Coordinates: 55.8879°N 4.2918°W

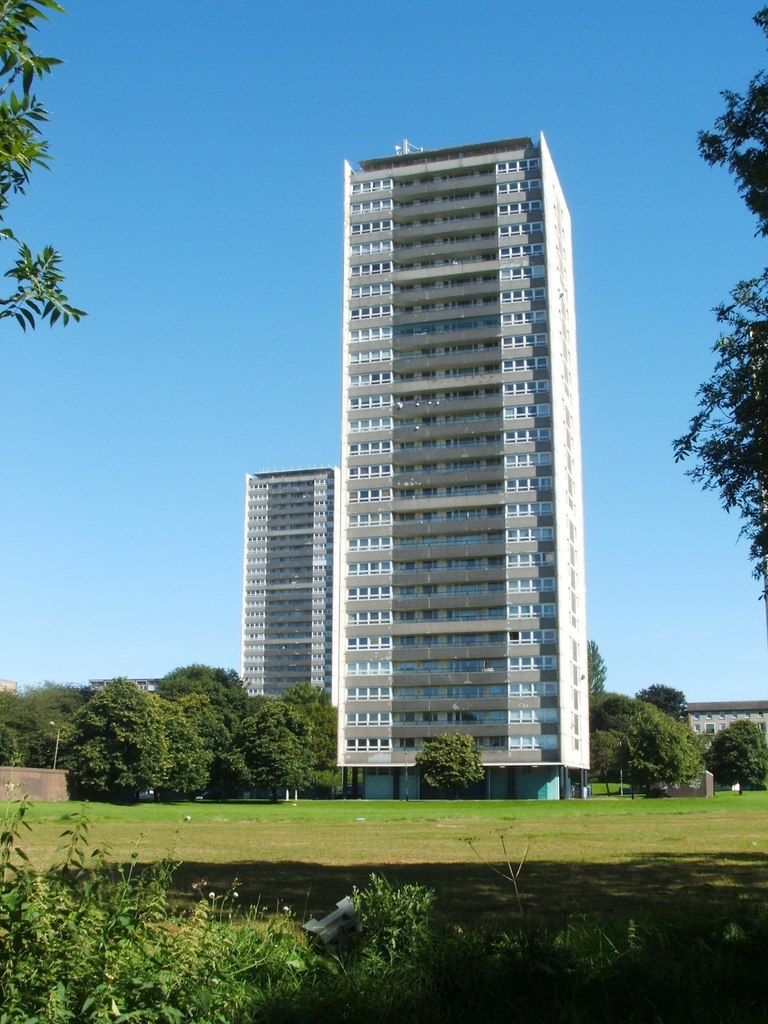
- Wyndford flats (2010, prior to refurbishment)

- Location within Glasgow
- OS grid reference: NS566684
- Council area: Glasgow City Council
- Lieutenancy area: Glasgow
- Country: Scotland
- Sovereign state: United Kingdom
- Post town: GLASGOW
- Postcode district: G20 8
- Dialling code: 0141
- Police: Scotland
- Fire: Scottish
- Ambulance: Scottish
- UK Parliament: Glasgow North
- Scottish Parliament: Glasgow Maryhill; Glasgow

Wyndford is an area of the city of Glasgow, Scotland. Located two miles (three kilometres) northwest of the city centre in Maryhill, Wyndford is bounded by Maryhill Road to the north and the River Kelvin to the south. The area comprises council housing that is typical of that which was built throughout Glasgow in the 1960s and 1970s. The houses are now either privately owned or mainly run by Wheatley Homes Glasgow.

It was built on the site of the former Glasgow city barracks, hence many local people colloquially refer to the area as "the Barracks". These barracks were built in 1872 when the Glasgow barracks were moved from the city's east end to this site, despite the fact that Maryhill was technically not part of the city at the time, as it was then a politically independent burgh. It was home to the Highland Light Infantry. The former barracks' walls and gatehouse are still in place, and they formed a perimeter around the Wyndford estate. The nearby Walcheren Barracks maintains a vestigial link to the Army in the area.

After the barracks closed in 1960, the site was chosen for the Wyndford housing scheme (the Glaswegian term for housing estate). The new social housing, with four high-rise tower blocks and several smaller buildings, was commissioned by the Macmillan government and intended to be an example of high-quality social housing.

Footballers Charlie Nicholas and Jim Duffy are both originally from the Wyndford area.

It was an area of support for the Glasgow school closures protest, 2009.

== Demolition and Replacement ==
Wheatley Homes first proposed demolishing the towers in 2021, claiming that retrofitting the blocks to comply with modern standards would be impossible. Plans were presented to replace the 600 flats in the blocks with a 386 family homes and new community facilities.

However, while Wheatley Homes claimed 85% of residents supported the plan, some residents organised in the Wyndford Residents Union opposed the plans and were involved in a legal dispute with Glasgow City Council over the demolition. They argued for retrofitting the blocks to avoid the overall reductions in available social homes in the plans, as well as the environmental impact of demolishing and building anew.

Three of the four towers were demolished in March 2025 by controlled explosives, with the remaining tower to be gradually demolished due to its proximity to other buildings.

== See also ==
- Glasgow tower blocks
- List of tallest buildings and structures in Glasgow
