= Soor ploom =

Scottish confection

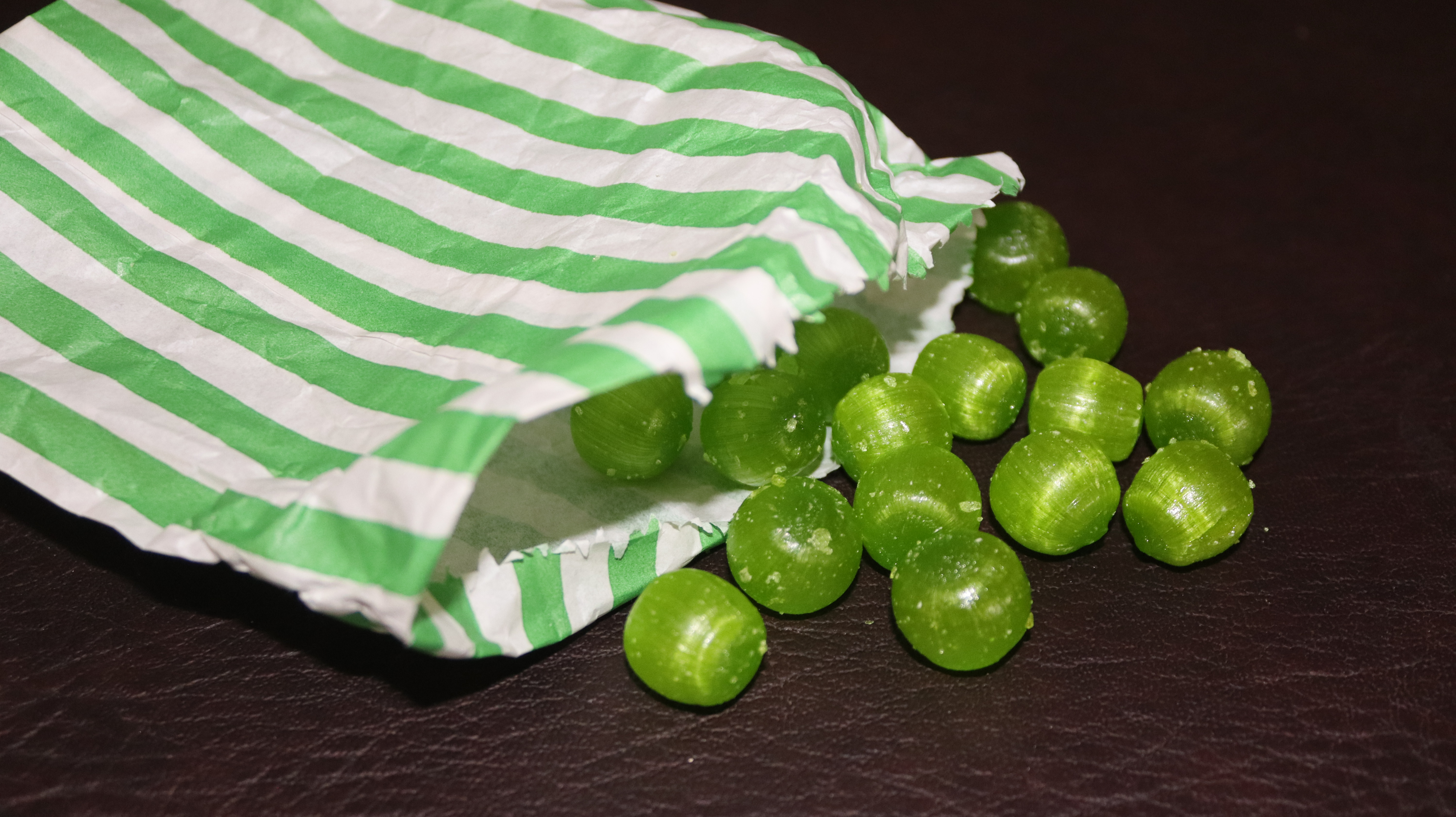
- A bag of soor plooms
- Type: Confectionery
- Place of origin: Scotland
- Region or state: Selkirkshire

A Soor ploom (Scots for "sour plum") is a sharp-flavoured, round, green boiled sweet originally associated with Galashiels, Scotland. They are sold loose by weight in paper bags, traditionally in "quarters" — a quarter of a lb.

They are said to have been first made in 1337 in commemoration of a skirmish near Galashiels. A raiding party from England were overwhelmed and killed by local men when discovered eating unripe plums. "Soor Plooms" is the motto of the town of Galashiels in Selkirkshire, Scotland.

Described as a "childhood favourite," they are green and "slightly acidic" in flavour. They have been featured in Oor Wullie and The Broons cartoons; additionally, there is a Border pipe tune from 1700 called "Soor Plooms of Galashiels".
