= Haldane Building =

Former drill hall in Glasgow, Scotland

- Glasgow, Scotland
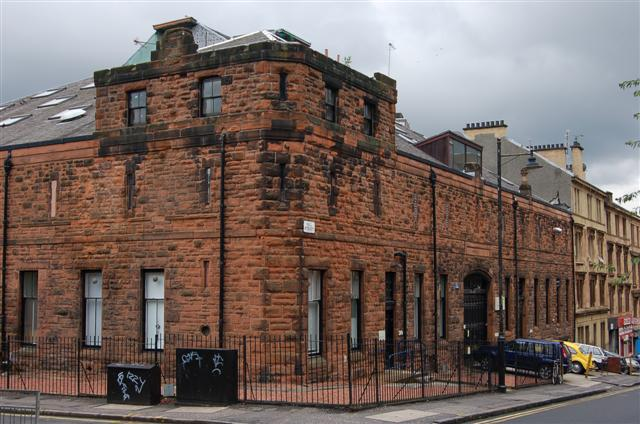
- Haldane Building

Site information
- Type: Drill hall
- Owner: Glasgow School of Art

Location
- Location within Glasgow
- Coordinates: 55.86681°N 4.26074°W

Site history
- Built: 1897
- Built for: War Office
- Architect: Horatio Kelson Bromhead
- In use: 1897 – 1967

The Haldane Building is a former drill hall at Hill Street in Garnethill, Glasgow.

== History ==
The building was designed by Horatio Kelson Bromhead as the headquarters of the 1st Volunteer Battalion the Highland Light Infantry and completed in 1897.

This unit became the 5th (City of Glasgow) Battalion, The Highland Light Infantry (Territorial Force) in 1908. The battalion was mobilised at the drill hall in August 1914 before being deployed to Gallipoli and then to the Western Front.

It became the home of 5th/6th Battalion, the Highland Light Infantry, on amalgamation with the 6th (which had been based in the Yorkhill Street drill hall), 10th and 11th Battalions of the Highland Light Infantry in 1947.

Colours flying, the 5/6th Battalion, the Highland Light Infantry marched from the Hill Street drill hall to amalgamate with the Glasgow Highlanders to form a company of the 52nd Lowland Volunteers at the Hotspur Street drill hall in 1967.

The drill hall was then decommissioned and converted for academic use: it is now known as the Haldane Building, named after the Glasgow engraver James Haldane, and is part of the Glasgow School of Art.

== Sources ==
- Osborne, Mike (2006). Always ready: Drill Halls of Britain’s Volunteer Force. Partizan Press. ISBN 978-1858185095.
