= Ettrick and Lauderdale =

Former local government district in Scotland

- District
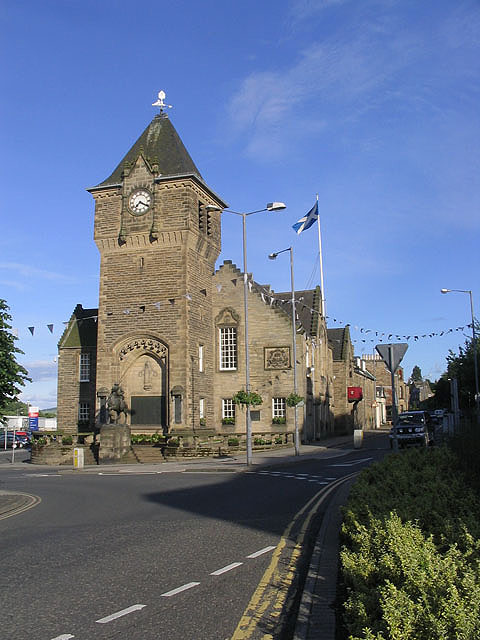
- Council Chambers, Paton Street, Galashiels

Coat of arms
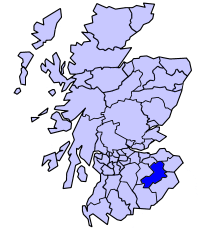
- History
  - Created: 16 May 1975
  - Abolished: 31 March 1996
  - Succeeded by: Scottish Borders
  - HQ: Galashiels
- Contained within
  - Region: Borders

Ettrick and Lauderdale was one of four local government districts in the Borders region of Scotland as well as a lieutenancy area from 1975 to 1996.

== History ==
The district was created on 16 May 1975 under the Local Government (Scotland) Act 1973, which established a two-tier structure of local government across Scotland comprising upper-tier regions and lower-tier districts. Ettrick and Lauderdale was one of four districts created within the Borders region. The district covered the whole of the historic county of Selkirkshire and parts of the neighbouring counties of Berwickshire, Midlothian, and Roxburghshire. The new district covered all of six former districts and parts of another three districts, which were all abolished at the same time:

From Selkirkshire:

- Galashiels Burgh
- Selkirk Royal Burgh
- North District
- South District

From Berwickshire:

- Lauder Royal Burgh
- West District (part, being the parishes of Channelkirk, Lauder (landward), Legerwood, Earlston, and Mertoun)

From Midlothian:

- Gala Water District (part, being the parishes of Heriot and Stow)

From Roxburghshire:

- Melrose Burgh
- Melrose District (part, being the parishes of Bowden, Lilliesleaf, Maxton, Melrose (landward), and St Boswells)

The new district was named after Ettrick Forest (which was also an old alternative name for Selkirkshire), and Lauderdale, being the valley of the Leader Water (roughly corresponding to the area gained from Berwickshire). For lieutenancy purposes, the last lord-lieutenant of the county of Selkirkshire was made lord-lieutenant for the new district when the reforms came into effect in 1975.

In 1989 the district was enlarged by the addition of a small area around the hamlet of Brothershiels from the neighbouring district of Midlothian. The district had an estimated population of 35,490 in 1994.

The Borders region and its four districts were abolished in 1996, merging to form the present Scottish Borders council area. A new lieutenancy area was created at the same time, called Roxburgh, Ettrick and Lauderdale, covering the combined area of the abolished districts of Ettrick and Lauderdale and neighbouring Roxburgh.

The former district's name is still used in a variety of contexts:

- It forms part of the name of the Tweeddale, Ettrick and Lauderdale Scottish Parliament constituency.
- The local young farmers club - Ettrick and Lauderdale JAC.
- Ettrick and Lauderdale Divisional Court, whose area corresponds to the former district, sits at Selkirk.
- Ettrick and Lauderdale Sports Council promotes interest and participation in sport in the area covered by the former Ettrick and Lauderdale District Council.
- Roxburgh, Ettrick and Lauderdale is one of the lieutenancy areas of Scotland.

== Political control ==
The first election to the district council was held in 1974, initially operating as a shadow authority alongside the outgoing authorities until it came into its powers on 16 May 1975. Throughout the council's existence a majority of the seats were held by independents:

Party in control	Years
Independent	1975–1996

The second last leader of the council, Drew Tulley, went on to be first leader of Scottish Borders Council after the 1996 reforms.

== Premises ==
The district council was based at the Council Chambers on Albert Place in Galashiels. The building had originally been built in 1867 as the Burgh Chambers for the old Galashiels Town Council, with a large clock tower added in 1924–1927 which incorporates the town's war memorial. A modern extension was added to the rear of the building along Paton Street for the district council in 1976. Since the district council's abolition in 1996 the building has been an area office for Scottish Borders Council.

== See also ==
- Subdivisions of Scotland
