= Glasgow Soldiers' Home =

Building in Glasgow, Scotland

Coordinates: 55.8874°N 4.2852°W

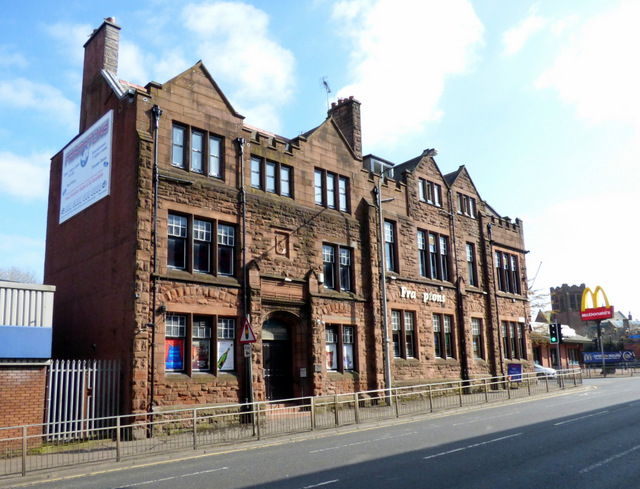
Glasgow Soldiers' Home today

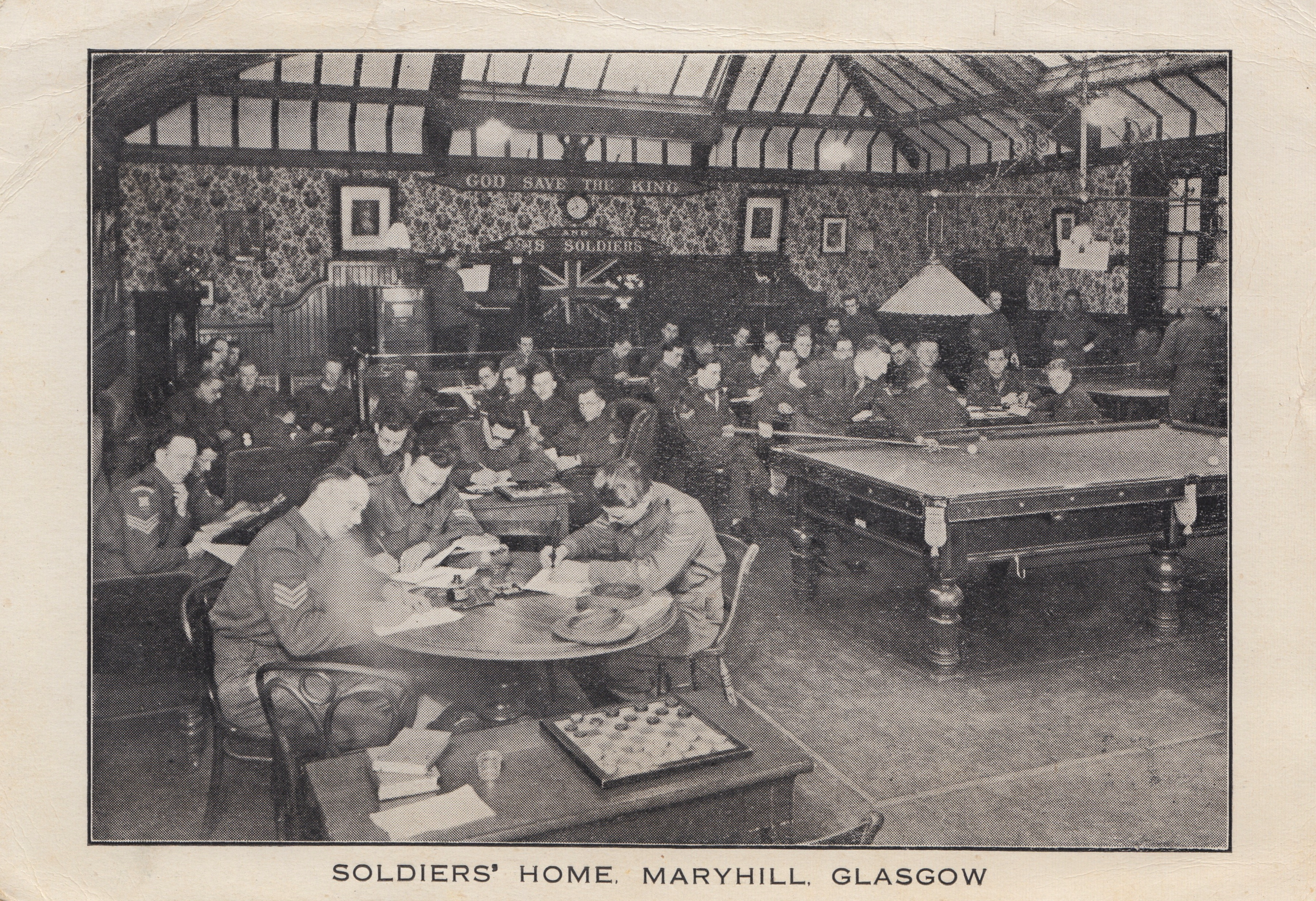
Post Card of Soldier's Home - Maryhill, Glasgow

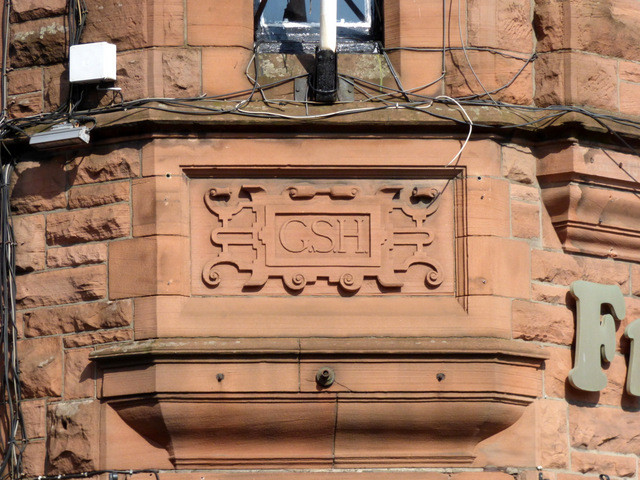
Sandstone initials of the Glasgow Soldier's Home

Glasgow Soldier's Home was a respite for soldiers and their wives near Maryhill Barracks in Glasgow, Scotland. It was completed in 1899. The home was established by Alice Osborne.

The building is category 'C' listed. It occupies 1236 Maryhill Road, on the corner of Ruchill Street. Construction started in 1892, triggering other similar facilities to be built at Redford Barracks in Edinburgh and Barry Buddon outside Dundee. For a fee soldiers could rent a room. The newlywed soldiers could spend their honeymoon night there. It offered a tearoom and a quiet room. It was described as "a neat edifice open to visitors".

An honorary superindendant who served for 24 years was Willamina Davidson OBE, who raised substantial sums and was involved in the Edinburgh and Barry Buddon facilities.

As of 2017 the building is in use as a nightclub.
