= Break the Chains (book) =

2015 book by Richie Venton

- Author: Richie Venton
- Language: English
- Subject: Politics
- Published: 2015
- Publisher: Scottish Socialist Party
- Publication place: Scotland
- Pages: 266
- ISBN: 9780957198661

Break the Chains a book by Scottish socialist and trade unionist Richie Venton. It was published on 17 December 2015 by the Scottish Socialist Party (SSP).

== Background ==
In the book, Venton argues in favour of a £10 minimum hourly wage as well as a national maximum wage, and a Four-day workweek.

== Release ==
A launch event was held in a cafe bar in Glasgow on 17 December 2015. The event was streamed online through the official SSP website.

Writing for the Scottish Socialist Voice Colin Turbett praised the book comparing it to The Establishment: And How They Get Away with It by Owen Jones.
