= Galashiels Burgh Chambers =

Municipal building in Galashiels, Scotland

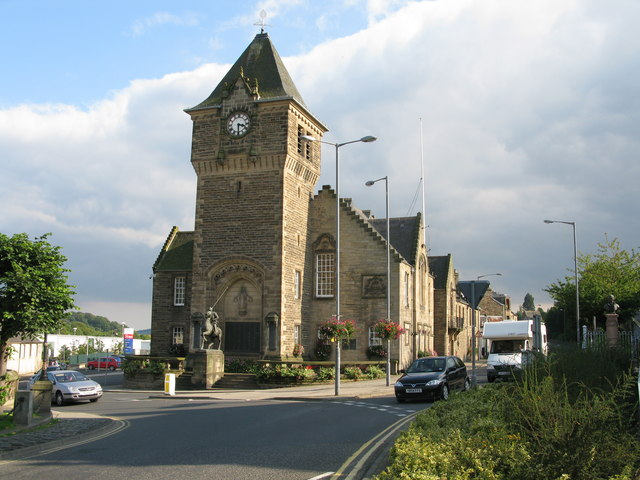
- Galashiels Burgh Chambers

- Shown in the Scottish Borders
- 55.6144°N 2.8064°W
- Location: Albert Place, Galashiels

History
- Built: 1867

Site notes
- Architect(s): Robert Hall & Co. and Sir Robert Lorimer
- Architectural style: Scottish Renaissance style

Listed Building – Category B
- Official name: Albert Place, Burgh Chambers and Clock Tower, including war memorials, ballustrading and steps
- Designated: 12 March 1971
- Reference no.: LB31977

Galashiels Burgh Chambers is a municipal building in Albert Place, Galashiels, Scotland. The building, which was the headquarters of Galashiels Burgh Council, is a Category B listed building.

== History ==
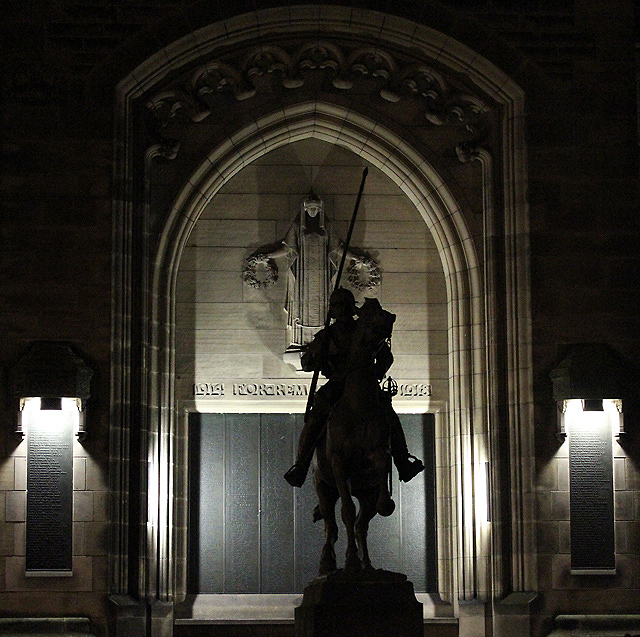
The equestrian statue of a Border reiver in the foreground and the war memorial in the background: with the lighting scheme devised by the council, the angel of peace appears to generate wings

The first municipal building in the town was a tolbooth completed around the time when the town became a burgh of barony in 1599. Like other Scottish tolbooths, it was primarily used as a prison, but by the mid-19th century the it was in a dilapidated condition. (Note: The old tolbooth was completely demolished in 1880.)

Following significant population growth, largely associated with the woollen industry, the area became a police burgh in 1850. The new burgh commissioners decided to commission a new municipal building for the burgh: it was designed by Robert Hall & Co. in the Scottish Renaissance style, built in ashlar stone at a cost of £2,200 and was completed in 1867. The design originally involved a symmetrical main frontage with four bays facing onto Albert Place; the central section of two bays, which slightly projected forward, featured two segmental sash windows on the ground floor, a tall two-light window with tracery on the first floor and a stepped gable above. The outer bays were fenestrated with segmental sash windows, although there was a panel in the left hand bay on the ground floor inscribed with the words "Burgh Chambers 1867". A stone plaque inscribed with the burgh coat of arms was installed on the northwest elevation of the building. (Note: The coat of arms depicted a fox and a plum tree recalling an incident when a group of English soldiers collecting wild plums were surprised and overcome by a group of Scotsmen in 1337.) Internally, the principal room was the council chamber on the first floor.

The building was extended to a design by Sir Robert Lorimer at a cost of £23,000 on the site of a former mill house between 1924 and 1927: the extension involved seven extra bays along Albert Place to the southeast with the second of the new bays, which slightly projected forward, featuring an architraved doorway on the ground floor, a tall window on the first floor and a stepped gable above. The extension, which also involved an extra ten bays along Paton Street, featured a prominent five stage tower at the northwest corner of the complex. The fifth stage of the tower was corbelled and surmounted by a pyramid-shaped roof. A clock, designed and manufactured by Potts of Leeds, was installed at the top of the tower on its northwest face.

The tower also incorporated, on the ground floor, a war memorial, the foundation stone for which was laid by the Prince of Wales on 3 December 1924. The war memorial took the form of a segmental arch containing a brass plaque commemorating the lives of local service personnel who had died in the First World War: it was surmounted by a statue depicting an angel of peace sculpted by the local sculptor, David Sutherland. The completed war memorial was unveiled by Field Marshal Earl Haig on 4 October 1925. An equestrian statue of a Border reiver, designed by Thomas Clapperton, was installed in front of the tower.

In 1930, burgh leaders revived an annual summer tradition, known as the "Braw Lads' Gathering", which involved riders on horseback setting off from the burgh chambers and parading through the town to celebrate the original creation of the burgh of barony. A wrought iron balcony, donated by the businessman, Alexander Darling, was installed on the Albert Place elevation in 1935. King George VI and Queen Elizabeth visited the burgh chambers and signed the visitors book at a table placed just to the left of the Albert Place entrance in July 1947.

The building continued to serve as the headquarters of Galashiels Burgh Council for much of the 20th century and remained the local seat of government after the enlarged Ettrick and Lauderdale District Council was formed in 1975. In order to accommodate the extra workforce associated with the expanding responsibilities of the council, a modern five bay extension to the Paton Street elevation, undertaken to a design by Aitken and Turnbull, was erected in 1976.

The building ceased to be the local seat of government when the new unitary authority, the Scottish Borders Council, was formed at Newtown St Boswells in 1996. However, the building continued to serve as a contact centre for the delivery of local services. In October 2020, a bronze torch with a glass flame, which had originally formed part of Lorimer's design in the 1920s but which was abandoned for reasons of cost at the time, was created and then installed on the northwest elevation of the building to act as an additional symbol of remembrance at night time.

== See also ==
- List of listed buildings in Galashiels, Scottish Borders
