= Netherdale =

Sports complex in Galashiels, Scotland

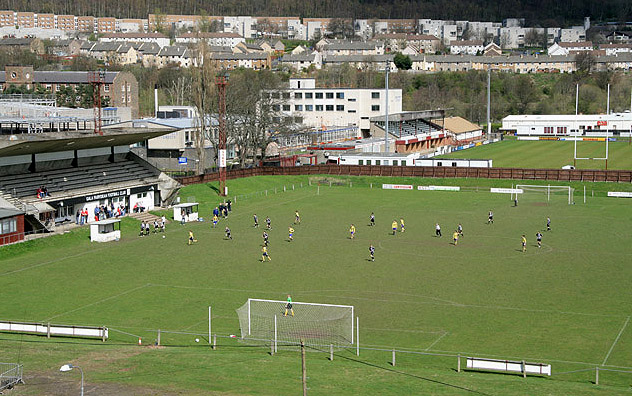
- Netherdale, with the football stadium in the foreground and the rugby stadium beyond

- Location within the Scottish Borders
- Location: Nether Road, Galashiels, Scottish Borders
- Coordinates: 55.607445°N 2.782545°W
- Capacity: 4,000 (rugby ground); 2,000 (football ground)
- Type: Stadium complex
- Surface: Grass (rugby ground); Artificial (football ground)

Construction
- Opened: 1912
- Renovated: 1961–62, 1964
- Architects: Peter Womersley (football stand)

Tenants
- Gala RFC Gala Fairydean F.C. Gala Rovers F.C. Border Reivers Gala Fairydean Rovers F.C.: 1912– 1929–2013 ?–2013; 1996–1998, 2002–2007; 2013–

Netherdale is a sports complex in Galashiels, Scottish Borders, consisting of two adjacent stadiums used for rugby union and football. The rugby ground is the home of Gala RFC and was formerly used by the professional Border Reivers team. It hosted one match of the 1999 Rugby World Cup. It has also occasionally been used for rugby league matches. The football ground is home to Gala Fairydean Rovers and has a Category A listed grandstand.

== Overview ==
The Netherdale complex is located on Nether Road towards the east end of Galashiels, near the River Tweed. The Gala rugby ground is in the north-west corner of the site, with the Gala Fairydean Rovers football ground in the south-west; the two grounds are joined end-to-end. The rest of the site is taken up by a number of undeveloped rugby and football fields known as the back pitches. Gala RFC moved to the area in 1912 from their previous ground at Mossilee, initially playing on what is now the football ground before the construction of their present ground – "New Netherdale" – in 1961–62.

Gala Fairydean F.C. arrived at Netherdale in 1929, initially playing on an undeveloped pitch called Raid Stane Park, before taking over the old rugby ground. Local amateur club Gala Rovers F.C. also played at the Netherdale complex before the two clubs merged to form Gala Fairydean Rovers in 2013. Since the installation of a 3G pitch in 2011, the Fairydean ground is officially known as the 3G Arena Netherdale and is also used as a community football and rugby facility.

== Football ground ==
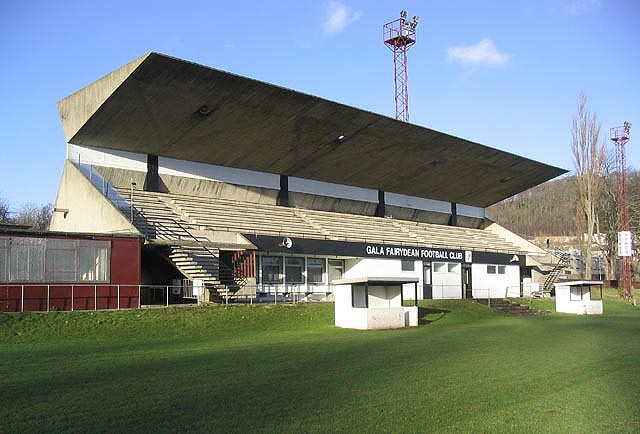
The main stand of Netherdale football stadium is a Category A listed building

Gala RFC had previously played at the Public Park and Mossilee before moving to Netherdale in 1912, where their new ground incorporating a pavilion and grandstand was built at a cost of £1,150. The first rugby match took place in September 1912, against local rivals Hawick. The rugby club continued to play on this part of the ground until the construction of the adjacent "New Netherdale" in 1961–62.

The football stadium has a capacity of around 2,000. The ground's most striking feature is the main stand, which was opened in 1964. With a capacity of 500 it is the largest stand in the Scottish Borders. Designed by the renowned British architect Peter Womersley in the brutalist style, the concrete structure is sometimes sarcastically dubbed as "the San Siro of the Borders". It was awarded a 'B' category listing by Historic Scotland in December 2006, which means the "character and setting" of the building must be preserved for "future generations".

Historic Scotland upgraded its listing to 'A' category in December 2013, stating that the stand is "a significant work of late modernist architecture in Scotland". The stand was closed during the 2018–19 season, pending works needed to repair water damage to the concrete. Works to the stand were completed in October 2022.

== Rugby ground ==
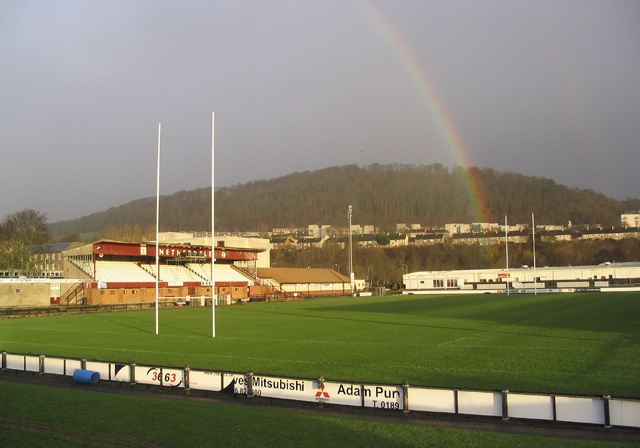
Netherdale rugby stadium, home of Gala RFC

The rugby stadium has a large grandstand which overlooks the pitch and the nearby Eildon Hills. While the professional Border Reivers club played, a second fully seated stand was installed, increasing the capacity to around 4,000 from the previous 2,000. New pitch protection systems were installed, which the Scottish Rugby Union continued to pay the maintenance costs for even after the Border Reivers club was closed.

The stadium hosted the 1999 Rugby World Cup Pool A match between Uruguay and Spain.

Netherdale has also hosted rugby league international matches, firstly the match between Scotland and France on 31 October 2014 as part of the 2014 European Cup. France won that match 38–22. As part of the 2015 European Cup, Netherdale hosted the match between Scotland and Ireland on 23 October.

== See also ==
- List of Category A listed buildings in the Scottish Borders
- List of listed buildings in Galashiels, Scottish Borders
