= Glasgow school closures protest, 2009 =

Protest in Glasgow, Scotland

Save Our Schools was a protest movement which arose in Glasgow, Scotland, in early 2009 against the proposed closure or merger of 13 primary schools and 12 nurseries in the city.

On 3 April 2009 parents occupied Wyndford and St. Gregory's primary schools in the Wyndford area of Maryhill in the city. A rally was held there on 4 April. The parents intended to remain in occupation over the Easter holiday.

A march in support of the campaign took place in Wyndford on 9 April, which was attended by around 400 people. There was a rally at the end at Wyndford Primary School, with several speakers including Bob Doris MSP, and campaign organiser Richie Venton.

The campaign planned to hold a short march and rally in George Square on 17 April at 10 a.m., the day the council executive made its decision.
