= Richie Venton =

Scottish trade unionist and political activist

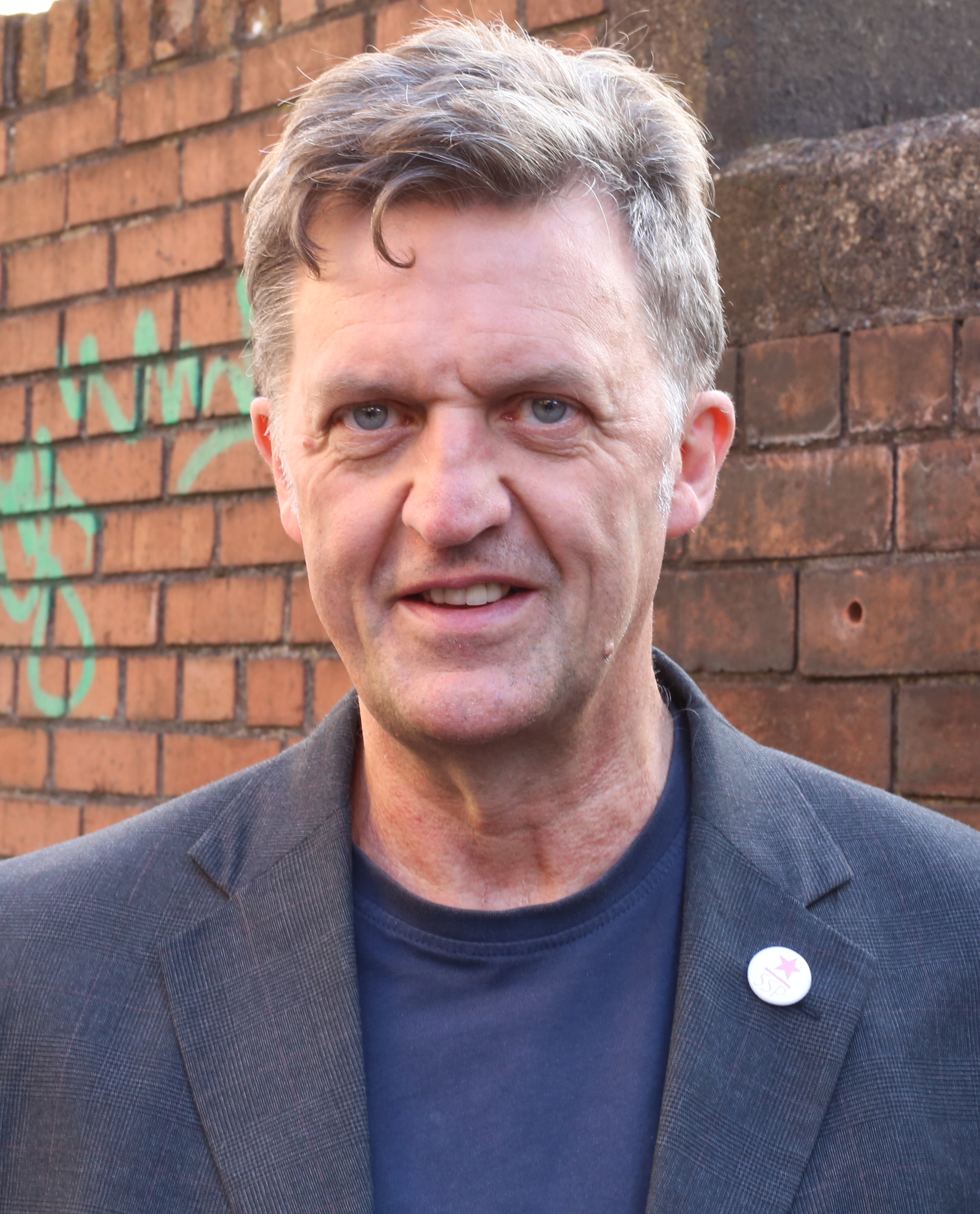
Venton in 2015

Richie Venton (born 1953) is a Scottish trade unionist and political activist. As of 2018, he is one of two Scottish representatives on the National Executive Council of the Union of Shop, Distributive and Allied Workers (USDAW) and the national trade union organiser of the Scottish Socialist Party. A former Militant organiser and a founding member of the SSP, he was a high-profile activist in the Scottish independence referendum campaign and spoke at a number of public meetings and debates.

== Political career ==
=== Earlier activism and foundation of the Scottish Socialist Party ===
Venton was a full-time regional organiser for the Militant tendency in Merseyside during the 1980s, when Militant controlled the Labour Party in Liverpool. His work with the entryist group saw him expelled from the Labour Party in 1986, alongside Derek Hatton and others. In the aftermath of Liverpool's failed rate-capping rebellion, Venton said in an interview: "I have no regrets. Liverpool could still be the graveyard of capitalism and the birthplace of socialism."

In Downfall, Alan McCombes writes: "Richie Venton, a dynamic Irishman originally from Fermanagh, who had been a Militant organiser in Liverpool during the Derek Hatton era, came up to Scotland to assist the Pollok general election campaign [in 1992] — and never went back. Richie brought a wealth of campaigning experience into the socialist movement in Scotland and [...] would become one of the key organisational driving forces behind the SSP."

=== Scottish Socialist Party ===
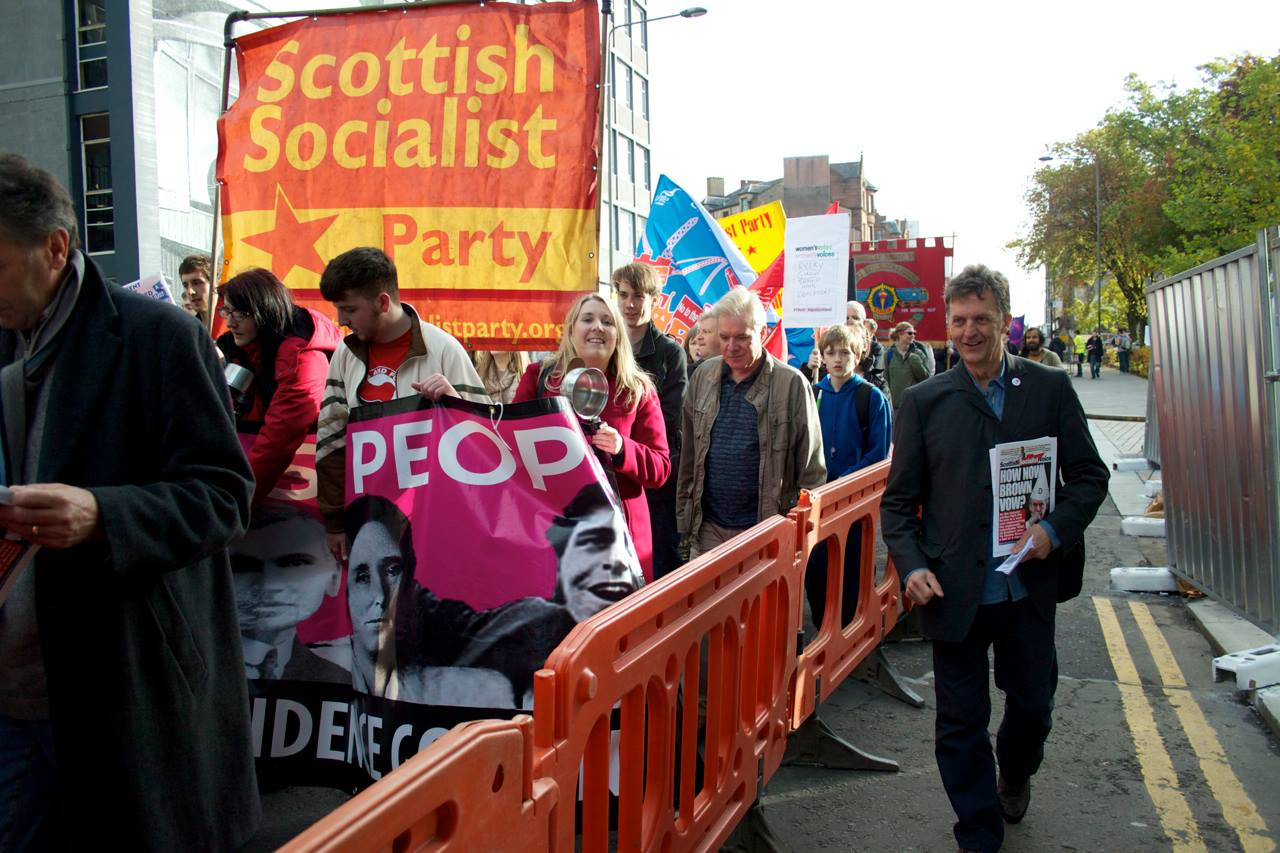
Richie Venton (right) in Glasgow, 18 October 2014

Richie Venton is the SSP's national workplace organiser and regional organiser for the West of Scotland. In 2009, Venton organised the Glasgow Save Our Schools (SOS) Campaign, which protested plans to close 11 primary schools and nine nurseries. The campaign involved a sit-in by mothers staged at two closure-threatened schools.

==== Scottish independence referendum ====
Speaking about the Scottish Socialist Party in the final weeks of the Scottish independence referendum campaign, Venton said: "We are the socialist wing of the Yes campaign. We don't want to just swap flags, but to change utterly the conditions the working class majority population of Scotland live under."

As part of the steering group of Trade Unionists for Independence, Venton worked extensively to persuade trade unionists of the case for a Yes vote. In March 2014, Venton faced Richard Leonard, then the GMB's political officer, in a debate on the subject of Scottish independence hosted by the union's nationwide Skills Development Scotland branch at their AGM. Speaking to Newsnet Scotland in its aftermath, union branch secretary Derek Cheyne said the audience "seemed to be quite positively on the Yes side". In September 2014, Venton spoke at another referendum debate organised by the Usdaw branch at IKEA, Glasgow, after which a straw poll found no members present backing the No side.

While referendum votes were being counted in Glasgow, Venton told Local News Glasgow: "This [referendum campaign] was mass political education. That cannot be stripped away or reversed now. These people will make demands and we'll have a different kind of Scotland either way the vote turns out."

==== Anti-austerity movement ====
Since the referendum campaign, Richie Venton has been active in opposing public sector cuts and joining the anti-austerity movement in Scotland. He has described welfare sanctions as "a criminal assault on some for the poorest in our communities".

In a piece for the Scottish Socialist Voice, Venton called on the Scottish Government and local councillors to refuse to pass on Westminster cuts, instead setting "No Cuts Defiance budgets" and then linking up with council workers' unions and community user groups in a massive campaign to demand extra funds from Westminster to balance the books. In January 2015, Venton took part in a live Inverclyde Radio debate with Labour Cllr Stephen McCabe, leader of Inverclyde Council, on the issue of cuts to council jobs and services. He cited the Liverpool rebellion as an example of effective defiance.

== Writings ==
In 2015, Venton published Break the Chains, in which he analyses and critiques the exploitation of labour, poverty pay and trade unions. It argues for a £10 minimum wage, a maximum wage, shorter working week and stronger trade unions.

On his aim in writing the book, he said he wanted "to answer the doubters and critics with hard facts and arguments that would help equip those willing to fight for decent living conditions for the working class majority".
