= Gallowgate Barracks =

Barracks in Glasgow, Scotland

- Glasgow
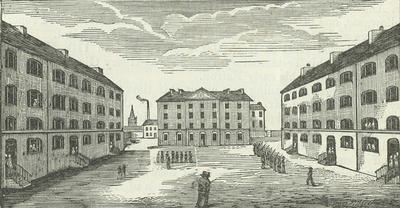
- Gallowgate Barracks

Site information
- Type: Barracks
- Operator: British Army

Location
- Location within Glasgow
- Coordinates: 55°51′23″N 04°14′03″W

Site history
- Built: 1795
- Built for: War Office
- In use: 1795-1878

Gallowgate Barracks were built in 1795. They were located at the east end of the Gallowgate, Glasgow, Scotland, and occupied in the year they were built.

== Construction ==
The barracks, often referred to as Glasgow Barracks, were built in 1795 at a cost of £15,000, and could accommodate up to 1,000 men. Before their construction, soldiers had been billeted with the town's inhabitants. The buildings were erected on the site of the city butts, where the burghers of medieval Glasgow had practised archery and were required to gather at the time of the wapinshaws (weapon shows), to present their arms and armour for inspection. The newly opened Barrack Street was its eastern boundary. It is unclear as to whether the land had been owned by the 'Town and University' and was sold to the Government for a token payment, or if the military were only allowed the use of the land, not sold it, and that it should have been returned to the original owners after it was no longer required. Historians noted that people were suspicious of the Government's motives for establishing military barracks throughout the country. This was a time of great concern for the Government. Social unrest throughout Europe had culminated in the French Revolution of 1789 and the ensuing war with France and there had been riots in the area during the weavers' strike of 1787.

== Occupation ==
=== 18th century ===
The first regiment to be stationed at the barracks were the Argyleshire Fencibles, soon followed the Sutherland Fencibles and The Gordon Highlanders. In 1796/7, in response to threats of a general uprising in Scotland and the establishment of a Scottish Republic, mainly due to the Militia Act in which the government had passed a law conscripting able bodied Scots males, between nineteen and twenty-three years old, for military service, the barracks played a central role in accommodating troops.

Riots were breaking out in Kirkintilloch, Freuchie, Strathaven, Galston, Dalry and throughout Aberdeen. The North Fencibles, and a party of artillery with two field-pieces, marched from Glasgow Barracks for Greenock to be replaced by a detachment of thirty artillerymen, with two field-pieces, from Leith Battery. In October 1797, the 21st Regiment of Foot marched from Glasgow Barracks for Dundee, and the 8th Regiment for Dumfries, Kirkcudbright and Stranraer. They were replaced by the Cheshire Militia, who were then dispatched to Dumbarton.

In July 1798, The West Lowland Fencibles arrived in Glasgow Barracks. Soldiers of the York and Cheshire regiments were also in the Barracks that year. A year later, nearly 300 men of the Nottinghamshire Militia, quartered in Glasgow Barracks, volunteered their services into Regiments of the Line, for European service.

=== 19th century ===
The return of the 100th Regiment to the United Kingdom occurred on 31 October 1868, with 51 sergeants, 34 corporals, 15 drummers, 431 privates and 26 officers. The next home for the Regiment was Scotland where they arrived in Glasgow on 12 November. They were quartered at Gallowgate Barracks with detachments at Paisley and Ayr. There they stayed until 9 September 1869 whence they departed for Manchester, England and Salford Barracks. Detachments were sent to Ashton, Bury and Burnley. In 1869, the 90th Regiment returned from India to Gallowgate Barracks, and then in 1878, sailed for South Africa.

== Decline ==
By the mid-19th century, the buildings were in a dire condition. Such was the spread of disease due to soldiers sleeping with the "sporting ladies" of the town that certain wards of the Glasgow Royal Infirmary were used only to treat the military. This, and the "exceptional depravity" of the area, was given as one of the reasons for the re-location of the barracks, but the University had already moved from the area because the Gallowgate was an unhealthy place to live. In 1872 new barracks were opened on Maryhill Road.

== Dereliction and sale ==
The Gallowgate Barracks fell into dereliction after new quarters were built in Maryhill. Despite hopes that the War Office would hand back the barracks to the city to be utilised as an open garden space, they were sold to a railway company in 1889 for use as a railway goods yard.

== The site today ==
A rifle range consisting of a series of brick walls/foundations with sand pits dug out of the concrete floor behind the walls was located in the South Tunnel. The rifle range in the tunnel was in use throughout the seventies and eighties by a civilian rifle and pistol club and was entered through a small door in the perimeter wall in Barrack Street.

== Sources ==
- Delavoye, Alexander Marin (1880). Records of the 90th Regiment, (Perthshire Light Infantry); with roll of officers from 1795 to 1880. Richardson & Co.
