= Victoria Road drill hall =

Former military installation in Glasgow, Scotland

- Glasgow, Scotland
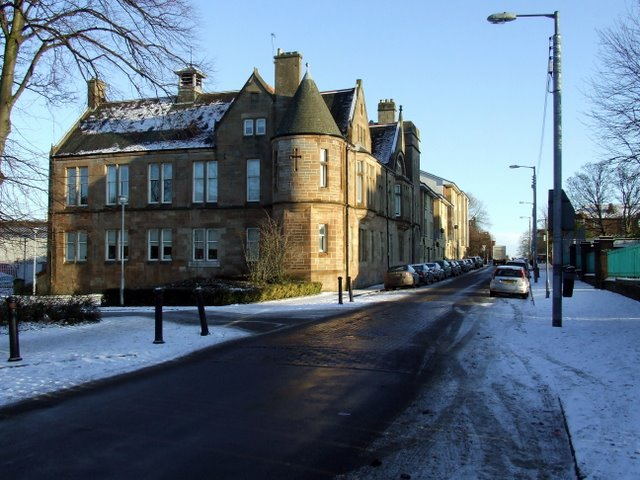
- The Coplaw Street extension to the Victoria Road drill hall

Site information
- Type: Drill hall

Location
- Location within Glasgow
- Coordinates: 55.84030°N 4.26476°W

Site history
- Built: 1884
- Built for: War Office
- Architect: John Bennie Wilson
- In use: 1884 – 1950

The Victoria Road drill hall is a former military installation in Glasgow.

== History ==
The building was designed by John Bennie Wilson as the headquarters of the 3rd Lanarkshire (1st Glasgow Southern) Rifle Volunteer Corps and completed in 1884. It was extended along Coplaw Street in 1903. The 3rd Lanarkshire (1st Glasgow Southern) Rifle Volunteer Corps became the 7th Battalion, The Cameronians (Scottish Rifles) in 1908. The battalion was mobilised at the drill hall in August 1914 before being deployed to Gallipoli and then to the Western Front. The battalion amalgamated with the 6th Battalion, The Cameronians (Scottish Rifles) to form the 6th/7th Battalion, The Cameronians (Scottish Rifles) at the Muir Street drill hall in Hamilton in 1950 although a company remained at the Victoria Road drill hall until the 6th/7th Battalion was disbanded in 1967. The drill hall was also used for parades by the Boys' Brigade in the 1960s. The original drill hall was subsequently demolished leaving only the Coplaw Street extension standing: the extension was converted for leisure centre use in 1984 and then converted to apartments in 2001.

== See also ==
- Third Lanark A.C.
