= Paton Street drill hall, Galashiels =

Military installation in Galashiels, Scotland

Paton Street drill hall
- Galashiels, Scotland
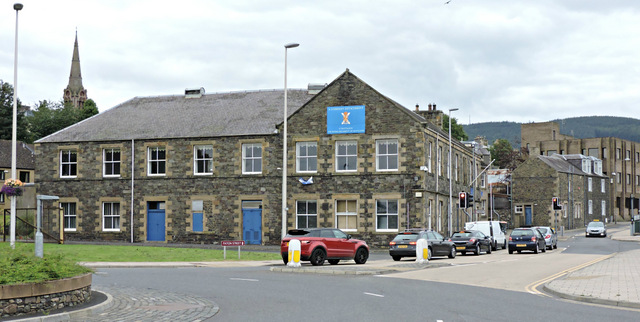
- Paton Street drill hall

Site information
- Type: Drill hall

Location
- Location in the Scottish Borders
- Coordinates: 55.61392°N 2.80479°W

Site history
- Built: 19th century
- Built for: War Office
- In use: 19th century - present

The Paton Street drill hall is a military installation in Galashiels, Scotland.

== History ==
The building was designed as offices for Mid Mill, sometimes known as Valley Mill, which was located to the immediate north of the site, and completed in the late 19th century. It was acquired by the War Office for use by the 4th Battalion, the King's Own Scottish Borderers in 1908. The battalion was mobilised at the drill hall in August 1914 before being deployed to Gallipoli and then to the Western Front.

The 4th and 5th battalions amalgamated to form the 4th/5th Battalion, with its headquarters at the Paton Street drill hall in 1961. The battalion headquarters moved to Dumfries in 1967 with just a single company left at the Paton Street drill hall. This unit evolved to become No. 3 (The King's Own Scottish Borderers) Company, 2nd Battalion, 52nd Lowland Volunteers in 1971, B (King's Own Scottish Borderers) Company, 2nd Battalion, 52nd Lowland Volunteers in 1992 and D (King's Own Scottish Borderers) Company, 52nd Lowland Regiment in 1999. In 2006 D Company was disbanded but an Anti-Tank Platoon and a Rifle Platoon, forming part of A (Royal Scots Borderers) Company, 52nd Lowland, 6th Battalion The Royal Regiment of Scotland, was retained and remains based at the Paton Street drill hall.
