= Yorkhill Street drill hall =

Military building in Glasgow, Scotland

- Glasgow, Scotland
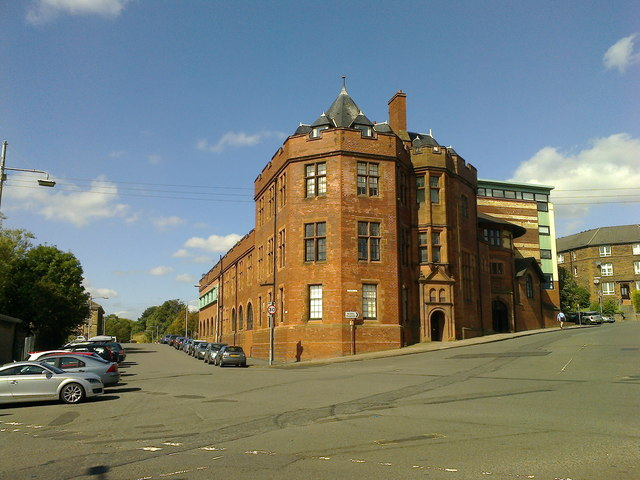
- Yorkhill Street drill hall

Site information
- Type: Drill hall

Location
- Location within Glasgow
- Coordinates: 55.86493°N 4.29382°W

Site history
- Built: 1901
- Built for: War Office
- Architect: William Hunter McNab
- In use: 1901 – 1999

The Yorkhill Street drill hall is a former military installation in Glasgow.

== History ==
The building was designed by William Hunter McNab of the Leiper and McNab architectural firm, to serve as the headquarters of the 2nd Volunteer Battalion the Highland Light Infantry. It was completed with funds donated by Sir Thomas Lipton in 1901. This unit became the 6th (City of Glasgow) Battalion, The Highland Light Infantry (Territorial Force) in 1908. The battalion was mobilised at the drill hall in August 1914 before being deployed to Gallipoli and then to the Western Front. The battalion amalgamated with the 5th, 10th and 11th Battalions of the Highland Light Infantry to form the 5th/6th Battalion, the Highland Light Infantry at the Hill Street drill hall in 1947.

The Yorkhill Street drill hall was instead occupied by the new 15th (Scottish Volunteer) Battalion, The Parachute Regiment, under the command of Lieutenant Colonel Alastair Pearson, in 1947 and was subsequently renamed "Pearson Hall" after its former commanding officer. In 1993, the 15th (Scottish Volunteer) Battalion was reduced to a company within 4th Battalion, Parachute Regiment. After 15 Company moved to more modern premises at "New Pearson Hall" in Houldsworth Street in the late 1990s, the Yorkhill Street drill hall was decommissioned and converted for residential use in 2000.
