= Thomas Paterson Noble =

Scottish surgeon

Prof Thomas Paterson Noble FRCSE FRSE OWE (3 March 1887 – 16 December 1959) was a Scottish surgeon who served Prajadhipok, the King of Siam

== Life ==
He was born in Galashiels on 3 March 1887 the son of Margaret Paterson and her husband Alexander Noble, a chemist. He studied medicine at the University of Edinburgh graduating with an MB ChB in 1911 and gaining his MD in 1913. He also studied at University College London and held resident posts at Leith, Greenwich, and Queen Charlotte's Hospital.

In the First World War he served as a Lieutenant in the Royal Army Medical Corps. After the war he took a post at the Orthopaedic Hospital in Oswestry then in 1924 gained a Rockefeller Scholarship to the Mayo Clinic in America. From here (around 1925) he received an opportunity to work in what was then Siam (now Thailand) as Professor of Surgery at Chulalongkorn University in Bangkok. He also then became official Physician to Prajadhipok, the King of Siam.

He was awarded the Orders of the Crown and the White Elephant.

In 1927 he was elected a Fellow of the Royal Society of Edinburgh. His proposers were Sir Frederick Hobday, Spencer Mort, Francis Albert Eley Crew and Sir David Wilkie.

He left Siam during the Second World War and returned to Britain to fill necessary roles vacated by the war, becoming Surgeon in Charge of Ebbw Vale General Hospital in Wales in 1940.

He retired to Southampton soon after the end of the war once a suitable person was found to fill his role. He continued as a consultant to the Ministry of Pensions.

He died in Bournemouth on 16 December 1959.

== Family ==
In 1914 he married Cecilia Farmer. They had one daughter.

== Publications ==
- Myositis ossificans. Surg Gynec Obstet 1924, 39, 795–802.
- Pseudocoxalgia. J Bone Jt Surg 1925, 7, 70–84.
- Klippel-Feils syndrome, numerical reduction of cervical vertebrae, with J M Frawley. Ann Surg 1925, 82, 728–734.
- Acute bone atrophy, with E D W Hauser. Arch Surg 1926,12, 75–94.
