= Titchfield Street drill hall, Kilmarnock =

Former military installation

Titchfield Street drill hall
- Kilmarnock, Scotland
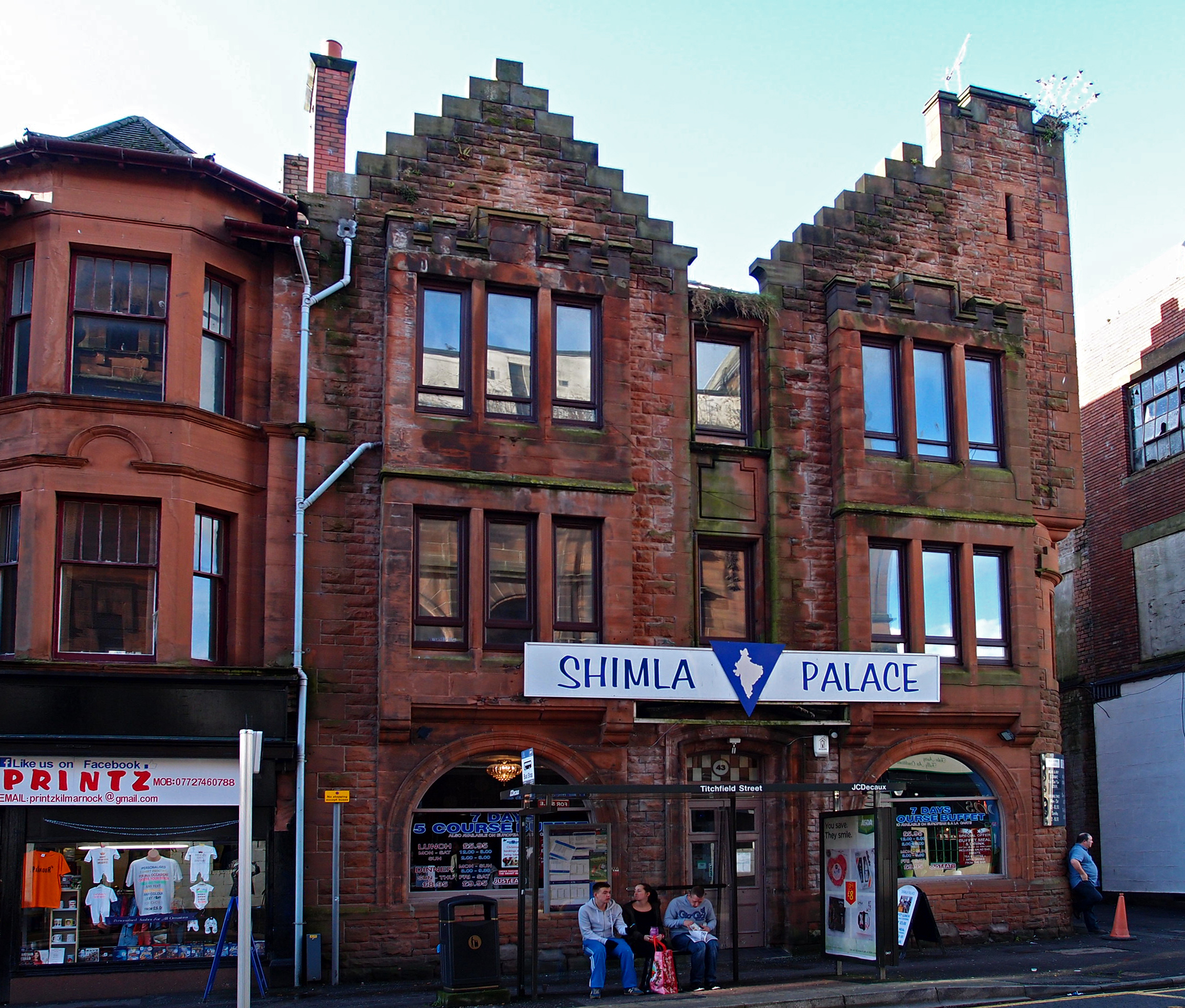
- Titchfield Street drill hall (now a restaurant)

Site information
- Type: Drill hall

Location
- Location within East Ayrshire
- Coordinates: 55.60644°N 4.49749°W

Site history
- Built: 1914
- Built for: War Office
- Architect: Gabriel Andrew & Son
- In use: 1914 – 1967

The Titchfield Street drill hall is a former military installation in Kilmarnock.

== History ==
The building was designed by Gabriel Andrew & Son as the headquarters of the 4th Battalion, The Royal Scots Fusiliers and completed in 1914. The battalion was mobilised at the drill hall in August 1914 before being deployed to Gallipoli and then to the Western Front. The battalion amalgamated with the 5th Battalion to form the 4th/5th Battalion at the drill hall in Ayr in 1921 although a company remained at the Titchfield Street drill hall until the 4th/5th Battalion was disbanded in 1967. The building was also the home of C Squadron of the Ayrshire (Earl of Carrick's Own) Yeomanry until the squadron was disbanded in 1967.

The building was taken over the Kilmarnock and District Model Railway Club in 1971 and has since been converted for retail use, most recently as a restaurant.
