= Burns Statue Square drill hall, Ayr =

Burns Statue Square drill hall
- Ayr, Scotland
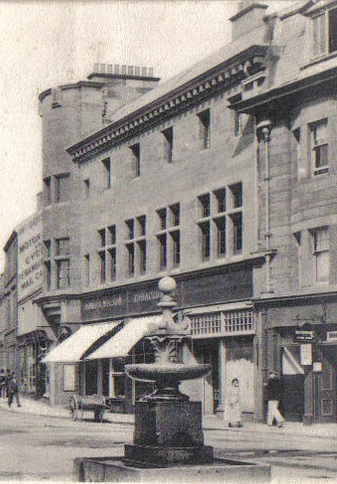
- Burns Statue Square drill hall c.1904

Site information
- Type: Drill hall

Location
- Location within South Ayrshire
- Coordinates: 55.45867°N 4.62867°W

Site history
- Built: 1901
- Built for: War Office
- Architect: James Archibald Morris
- In use: 1901 – 1967

The Burns Statue Square drill hall is a military installation in Ayr.

== History ==
The building was designed by James Archibald Morris as the headquarters of the 2nd Volunteer Battalion the Royal Scots Fusiliers and was completed in 1901. This unit became the 5th Battalion the Royal Scots Fusiliers in 1908. The building was sold by auction by the War Office, as being surplus to requirements, in 1909. The building became a solicitor's office and has since been converted for retail use.
