= Walcheren Barracks =

Drill hall in Glasgow, Scotland

- Glasgow, Scotland
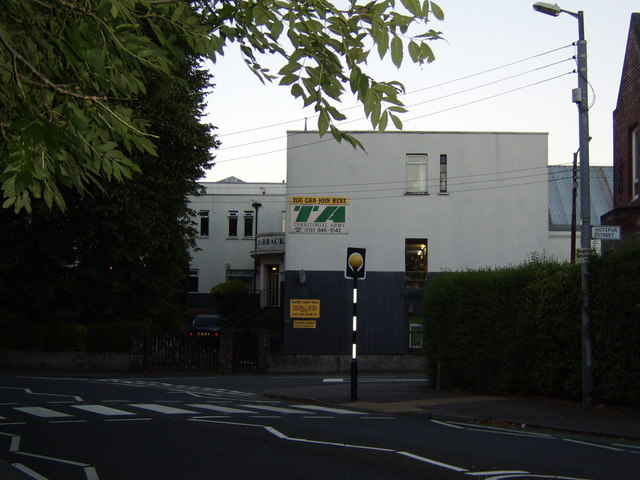
- Walcheren Barracks at the junction of Hotspur Street

Site information
- Type: Drill hall
- Owner: Ministry of Defence
- Operator: British Army

Location
- Location within Glasgow
- Coordinates: 55°53′3″N 04°17′11″W

Site history
- Built: 1935
- Built for: War Office
- In use: 1935 – present

Garrison information
- Occupants: 6th Battalion, The Royal Regiment of Scotland

Walcheren Barracks is a drill hall located at Hotspur Street in Maryhill, Glasgow, Scotland. It is located adjacent to the site of the former Maryhill Barracks.

== History ==
The current building was originally constructed in 1935 as the new headquarters of the 9th (Glasgow Highlanders) Battalion, The Highland Light Infantry, which had moved from 81 Greendyke Street (now demolished and replaced by apartments) near Glasgow Green. In 1967 it became the headquarters of the 52nd Lowland Volunteers, which was formed by the amalgamation of the redesignated 1st (Glasgow Highlanders) Battalion, The Highland Light Infantry and the 5th/6th Battalion, The Highland Light Infantry, which had been based at the Hill Street drill hall.

The building was named Walcheren Barracks in 1985 by Princess Margaret, on the occasion of the presentation of Colours to the 1st Battalion, 52nd Lowland Volunteers. The designation Walcheren, was in recognition of Operation Infatuate, part of the Battle of the Scheldt in which the Glasgow Highlanders of 52nd (Lowland) Division were involved in the capture of Walcheren Island on 8 November 1944.

The barracks today forms the base of the headquarters and two companies of 52nd Lowland, 6th Battalion, The Royal Regiment of Scotland, the regular recruitment team for the Royal Highland Fusiliers, 2nd Battalion, The Royal Regiment of Scotland, as well as detachments of the Army Cadet Force and Air Training Corps. Lowland House, headquarters of The Lowland Reserve Forces and Cadets Association is also located at the site.
