= Non Regular Permanent Staff =

Non Regular Permanent Staff (NRPS; often pronounced as Nerps) were members of the British Territorial Army who were employed on a full-time basis. They usually filled vital unit administration or quartermaster roles and are most often long-service TA veterans or retired regulars. They held military rank and wore uniform when appropriate. On 1 April 2003, there were 1,100 NRPS personnel: 300 commissioned officers and 800 other ranks.

In 2010, the NRPS positions were discontinued in favour of TA Home Commitment positions.
