= Galashiels =

Town in Scottish Borders, Scotland

Coordinates: 55.6194°N 2.8033°W

Galashiels: Scottish Gaelic: An Geal Àth; Scots: Gallae
- Town
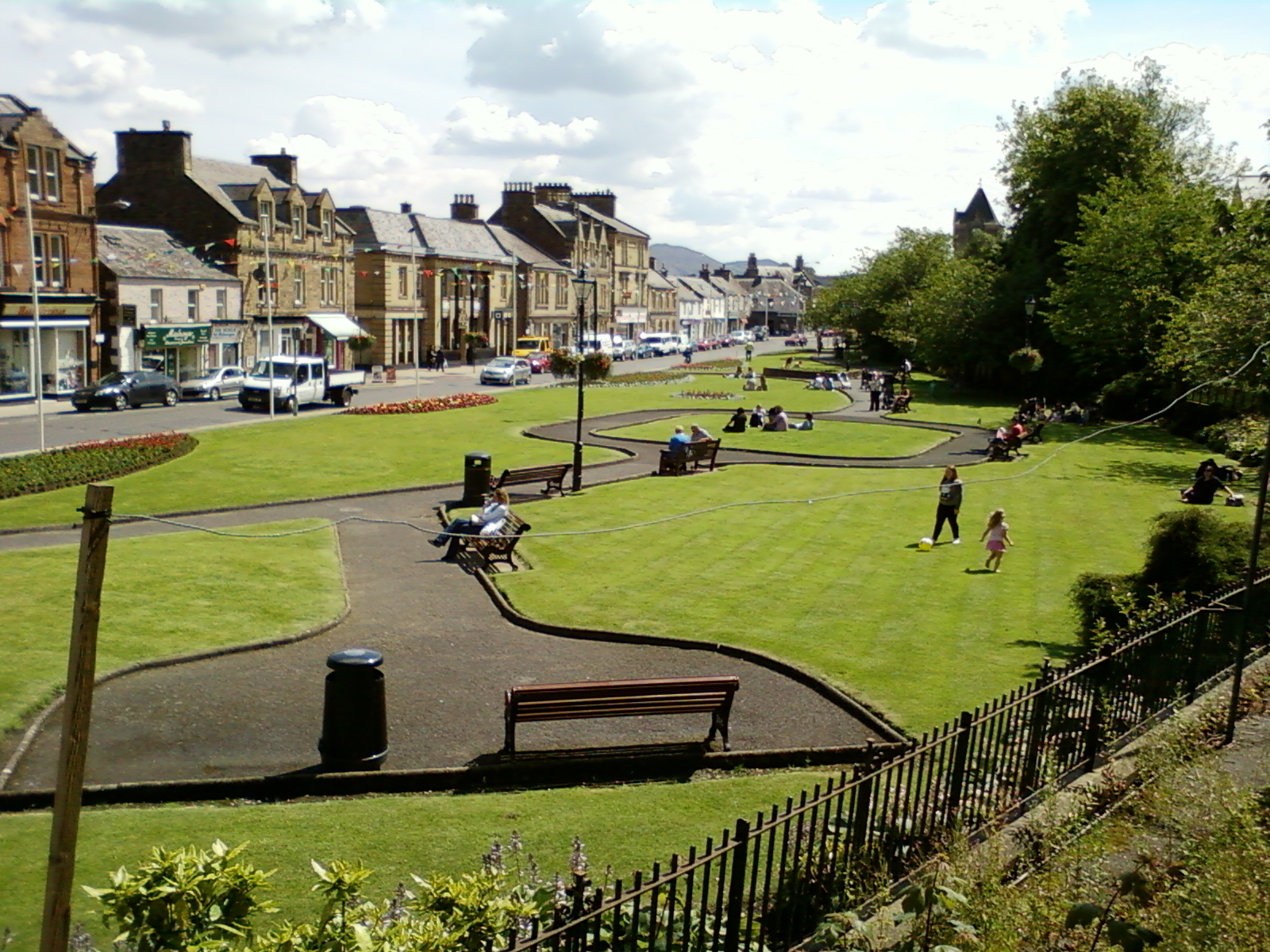
- Bank Street Gardens in Galashiels, 2011

- Location within the Scottish Borders
- Population: 10,075 (2022)
- OS grid reference: NT495365
- Council area: Scottish Borders
- Lieutenancy area: Roxburgh, Ettrick and Lauderdale
- Country: Scotland
- Sovereign state: United Kingdom
- Post town: Galashiels
- Postcode district: TD1
- Dialling code: 01896
- Police: Scotland
- Fire: Scottish
- Ambulance: Scottish
- UK Parliament: Berwickshire, Roxburgh and Selkirk
- Scottish Parliament: Midlothian South, Tweeddale and Lauderdale

Galashiels, (/ˌɡæləˈʃiːlz/; Scots: Gallae; Scottish Gaelic: An Geal Àth) colloquially known as Gala, is a town in the Scottish Borders. The town is a major commercial centre for the Borders region with extensive history in the textile industry. Galashiels is the location of Heriot-Watt University's School of Textiles and Design. The town had a population of 10,075 in 2022.

== History ==
To the west of the town, there is an ancient earthwork known as the Picts' Work Ditch or Catrail. It extends many miles south, and its height and width vary. There is no agreement about the purpose of the earthwork. There is another ancient site on the north-western edge of the town, at Torwoodlee, an Iron Age hill fort, with a later broch known as Torwoodlee Broch built in the western quarter of the hill fort, and overlapping some of the defensive ditches of the original fort. The Romans destroyed the broch in 140 CE, soon after it was completed.

The town's coat of arms shows two foxes reaching up to eat plums from a tree, and the motto is Sour Plums pronounced in Scots as soor plooms. This is a reference to an incident in 1337 when a raiding party of English soldiers were picking wild plums close to the town and were caught by Scots who came across them by chance and slaughtered them all.

On a hillside to the north of the town, Buckholm Tower is a prominent structure that dates back to 1582 and replaced an earlier tower built on the same site but destroyed around 1570. In 1599, Galashiels received its Burgh Charter, an event celebrated every summer since the 1930s by the "Braw Lads’ Gathering", with riders on horseback parading through the town. Galashiels Burgh Chambers were designed in the Scottish Renaissance style and completed in 1867.

The Paton Street drill hall was completed in the late 19th century. The textile trade caused Galashiels' population to increase dramatically from 800 residents at the start of the nineteenth century to 19,553 by 1890. A connection with the town's mill history, the Mill Lade, still links the town from near the site of mills at Wheatlands Road, to Netherdale, via Wilderhaugh, Bank Street, the Fountain and next to the Tesco/retail development street.

Despite the town's relatively low population, the early 2000s saw many new developments, including Asda, Boots pharmacy, Farmfoods, Marks & Spencer, Matalan, McDonald's, Next, Subway fast-food outlet and Tesco Extra. Most of these are on former mill and industrial estate sites, while other disused mills have been converted to living accommodations.

== Governance ==
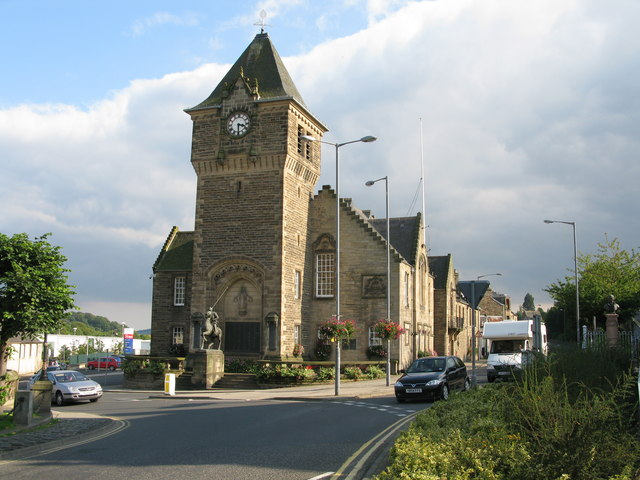
Galashiels Burgh Chambers

Local government services for Galashiels are provided by the Scottish Borders Council. There is also a community council covering the town. Galashiels was designated a burgh of barony in 1599 and later became a police burgh by 1868. Galashiels Burgh Chambers on Albert Place was built in 1867.

When elected county councils were created in 1890 under the Local Government (Scotland) Act 1889, burghs which met certain criteria were excluded from the area under the control of the county councils. There was disagreement between Galashiels and Selkirkshire County Council as to whether these criteria applied to Galashiels. The case went to court, and the Scottish Supreme Court found that Galashiels was entirely responsible for its own affairs and should neither be represented on nor taxed by Selkirkshire County Council. Further local government reform in 1930 brought the burgh of Galashiels within the area controlled by the county council, with the town being reclassified as a small burgh, ceding most of its functions to the county council.

In 1975, local government across Scotland was reformed under the Local Government (Scotland) Act 1973. The burghs and counties were abolished as administrative areas and replaced with a two-tier system of upper-tier regions and lower-tier districts. Galashiels therefore became part of the Ettrick and Lauderdale district within the Borders region. Ettrick and Lauderdale District Council used Galashiels Burgh Chambers as its headquarters. Further local government reform in 1996 abolished the regions and districts, since when Galashiels has been administered by Scottish Borders Council.

== Culture ==
=== The arts ===
Robert Burns wrote two poems about Galashiels, Sae Fair Her Hair and Braw Lads. The latter is sung by some of the townsfolk each year at the Braw Lads Gathering. Sir Walter Scott built his home, Abbotsford, just across the River Tweed from Galashiels. The Sir Walter Scott Way, a long-distance path from Moffat to Cockburnspath, passes through Galashiels. There is some largely good-hearted rivalry between some of the Galashiels townsfolk and those of other border towns, particularly Hawick, the next largest town in the Scottish Borders. Galashiels' citizens often refer to their rival as dirty Hawick while the 'Teries' retort that Galashiels's residents are pail merks, supposedly because their town was the last to be plumbed into the mains water system and so residents had to rely on buckets as toilets.

Galashiels was home to the poet, painter and watercolourist George Hope Tait. Tait joined the Galashiels Town Council, on which he served for more than twenty-nine years. He played a key role in the establishment of the Braw Lads Gathering in 1930, as well as in the erection of the War Memorial and the construction of the new Burgh Chambers in Galashiels. The town was home to the author of the famous Scottish song Coulters Candy. Robert Coltart was a weaver in the town, but also made confectionery in nearby Melrose. The song was created as an advertisement and hence was renamed Sugar Candy when played by the BBC. The song is possibly better known by the first line of its chorus - "Ally, bally, ally bally bee". Coltart died in 1890. A statue of Coltart now stands in the Market Square. The 1985 Marillion hit single Kayleigh was partially inspired by events that took place in Galashiels as the band's lead singer, Fish, spent some time in the town in his earlier years. In 2012, the Scottish Borders Council undertook work to revamp the Market Square with lyrics of the song inscribed into the paving slabs. Fish officially reopened the square on completion later that year.

A new £6.7m Great Tapestry of Scotland visitor centre opened in Galashiels on 21 August 2021, to house one of the world's largest tapestries and community arts projects. The Great Tapestry of Scotland was hand stitched by over 1,000 people across Scotland and had been taken for display around the country throughout its six-years' creation, the original brainchild of Edinburgh-born author Alexander McCall Smith, whose vision it was to create a tapestry telling the history of Scotland. The new purpose-built gallery, visitor centre, café and workshop space has been created and, on the opening day, saw the 160th and final tapestry panel revealed by chief stitcher Dorie Wilkie, accompanied by McCall Smith himself.

The Pavilion Cinema in Market Street opened in 1922 as a cinema, dance hall and theatre, originally named the Playhouse. The auditorium was converted to a bingo hall in the 1960s. The building was refurbished in the early 1990s, with its original art-deco façade being restored. It is now a four-screen cinema.

=== Sports ===
The following sports clubs are based in Galashiels:

- Gala Cricket Club
- Gala Fairydean Rovers (association football)
- Gala RFC (rugby union)
- Galashiels Golf Club
- Galashiels Squash and Racketball club

=== Landmarks ===
The town is home to the Glasite church, in danger of being lost, but still standing sandwiched between mills and shop buildings on High Street, Botany Lane and Roxburgh Street.

Netherdale is home to Gala RFC and Gala Fairydean Rovers, with the football and rugby stadiums adjoining each other at one end. The football club's main stand was built in 1963 to designs by Peter Womersley, based in nearby Gattonside. The cantilevered concrete structure, in the Brutalist style, is now protected as a Category A listed building.

=== Television and print ===
Local news and television programmes are provided by BBC Scotland and ITV Border. Television signal are received from the Selkirk and the local relay transmitters.

Local radio stations are BBC Radio Scotland on 93.5 FM, Greatest Hits Radio Scottish Borders and North Northumberland on 96.8 FM and TD1 Radio, a community based radio station that broadcast on 106.5 FM.

The Border Telegraph and Southern Reporter are the town's local newspapers.

== Transport ==
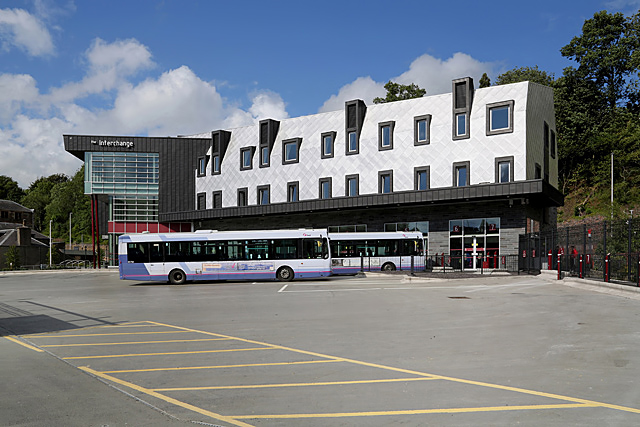
Galashiels Transport Interchange, a combined bus and railway station, shown in August 2015

In 1969, the historic Waverley Line, which connected the Scottish Borders to the national rail network, was closed as part of a wider series of cuts to British Railways. The closure led to a campaign for a return of rail to the region that never diminished. Following years of campaigning, in 2006, the Waverley Railway (Scotland) Act was passed by the Scottish Parliament, which authorised a partial restoration of the service. The new Borders Railway, which links Galashiels with Edinburgh, saw four new stations built in Midlothian and three in the Scottish Borders.

For most of the route, the original line was followed with 30 miles (50 kilometres) of new railway line built. The project is estimated to have cost £294 million and was completed in September 2015, with the formal opening on 9 September by Queen Elizabeth II. Trains from Galashiels railway station run every half-hour going down to hourly in the evening and on Sundays. Journey times between Tweedbank and Edinburgh take less than one hour.

The town is also served by several bus routes, operated by Borders Buses. They include X62 (to Edinburgh via Peebles, X95 (Edinburgh to Carlisle), 51 (to Edinburgh via Lauder) as well as a number of local routes.

A transport interchange building was opened in August 2015, shortly before the opening of the restored railway line. It is situated next to the railway station, on the site of the old bus station. It has a café, and upstairs has office space that has been leased to businesses and organisations. It also has toilet and baby-changing facilities, and a travel help desk.

== Education ==
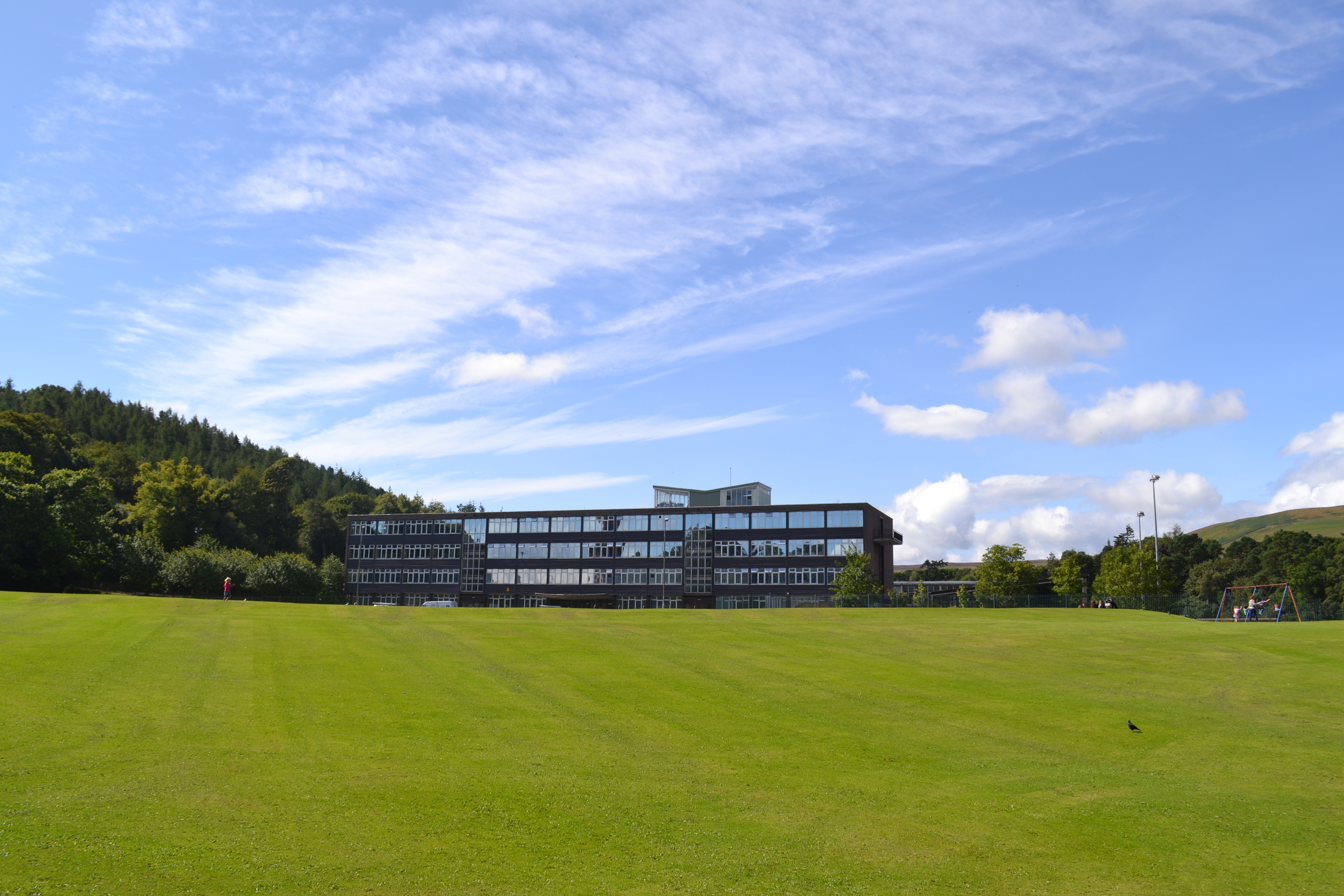
Galashiels Academy is the only secondary school in the town

The following are listed by Scottish Borders Council as being in the Galashiels area and are catchment schools for Galashiels Academy.

Primary schools

- Balmoral Primary
- Burgh Primary
- Clovenfords Primary (moved from Caddonfoot in 2012)
- Fountainhall Primary, Midlothian
- Glendinning Terrace Primary
- Heriot Primary, Midlothian
- Langlee Primary
- Stow Primary
- St Margaret's Roman Catholic Primary
- St Peter's Primary
- Tweedbank Primary

Secondary schools

- Galashiels Academy

Further and Higher education

Netherdale in Galashiels is home to Heriot-Watt University's School of Textiles and Design, which is also a shared campus of Borders College.

== Notable people ==
- Dugald Butler (1862–1926) parish minister and historical author
- Craig Chalmers (born 1968), rugby player
- Thomas J Clapperton (1879–1962), sculptor
- Archie Cochrane (1909–1988), epidemiologist
- John Collins (born 1968), footballer
- Jimmy Curran (1880–1963), athlete and athletics coach
- Johnny Davidson (born 1971), Tourette syndrome campaigner
- James Donald (1917–1993), actor
- Scilla Elworthy (born 1943), Peace activist and founder of the Oxford Research Group
- Russell Fairgrieve (1924–1999), politician
- Douglas Ford (1918–1943), army officer
- Danny Galbraith (born 1990), footballer
- Reverend Paton James Gloag (1823–1906) parish minister, Moderator in 1889
- Andrew John Herbertson (1865–1915), geographer and Oxford don
- Ross Kelly (born 1961), Television presenter
- Arthur Lapworth (1872–1941), Scottish chemist
- Ryan Mania (born 1989), winner of the 2013 Grand National
- Mary Monica Maxwell-Scott (1852–1920), author
- Sandy McDade (born 1964), actress
- Judith Miller (1951-2023), antiques expert
- Andrew Murdison (1898–1968), rugby player
- Alan V. Murray, historian
- Thomas Paterson Noble, (1887–1959), surgeon
- Chris Paterson (born 1978), rugby player
- Reverend K. M. Phin (1816–1888) parish minister, Moderator in 1877
- Anne Redpath (1895–1965), artist
- Bryan Redpath (born 1971), rugby player
- Brian Shillinglaw (1939–2007), rugby player
- Gregor Townsend (born 1973), rugby player and head coach of the Scotland national rugby union team
- Thomas Douglas Welsh (1933-2021), swimmer

== Climate ==
Galashiels has an oceanic climate. However, due to its elevated position and distance from the sea, it has colder winters and slightly warmer summers than coastal places such as Edinburgh, Dunbar and Eyemouth. Snow is also much more common in winter, and covers the ground for an average of 38 days a year in an average winter.

Climate data for Galashiels (161 m asl, averages 1991–2020)
Month	Jan	Feb	Mar	Apr	May	Jun	Jul	Aug	Sep	Oct	Nov	Dec	Year
Record high °C (°F)	13.2 (55.8)	13.6 (56.5)	16.5 (61.7)	23.9 (75.0)	25.6 (78.1)	27.9 (82.2)	29.5 (85.1)	29.2 (84.6)	24.6 (76.3)	21.1 (70.0)	16.3 (61.3)	14.6 (58.3)	29.5 (85.1)
Mean daily maximum °C (°F)	5.8 (42.4)	6.4 (43.5)	8.3 (46.9)	10.9 (51.6)	14.0 (57.2)	16.6 (61.9)	18.6 (65.5)	18.1 (64.6)	15.8 (60.4)	12.0 (53.6)	8.5 (47.3)	6.1 (43.0)	11.8 (53.2)
Daily mean °C (°F)	3.2 (37.8)	3.5 (38.3)	5.0 (41.0)	7.1 (44.8)	9.9 (49.8)	12.6 (54.7)	14.6 (58.3)	14.2 (57.6)	12.1 (53.8)	8.8 (47.8)	5.6 (42.1)	3.3 (37.9)	8.3 (46.9)
Mean daily minimum °C (°F)	0.6 (33.1)	0.6 (33.1)	1.7 (35.1)	3.4 (38.1)	5.7 (42.3)	8.7 (47.7)	10.5 (50.9)	10.4 (50.7)	8.4 (47.1)	5.7 (42.3)	2.7 (36.9)	0.6 (33.1)	4.9 (40.8)
Record low °C (°F)	−19.8 (−3.6)	−15.4 (4.3)	−14.8 (5.4)	−5.6 (21.9)	−3.3 (26.1)	0.0 (32.0)	2.5 (36.5)	0.8 (33.4)	−3.2 (26.2)	−5.7 (21.7)	−8.9 (16.0)	−14.6 (5.7)	−19.8 (−3.6)
Average precipitation mm (inches)	80.7 (3.18)	64.7 (2.55)	58.6 (2.31)	49.1 (1.93)	48.3 (1.90)	65.6 (2.58)	68.2 (2.69)	78.2 (3.08)	59.6 (2.35)	88.3 (3.48)	83.3 (3.28)	87.9 (3.46)	832.6 (32.78)
Average precipitation days (≥ 1.0 mm)	14.3	11.7	11.3	10.6	10.5	10.6	11.6	11.7	10.8	13.6	14.3	14.2	145.4
Mean monthly sunshine hours	47.9	72.1	101.9	136.3	168.4	147.0	152.3	142.2	110.6	79.2	61.4	43.0	1,262.1
Source 1: Met Office
Source 2: Starlings Roost Weather

== See also ==
- List of places in Scotland
- List of places in the Scottish Borders
- Shieling
