= Guards and Parachute Division =

- Active: 2022–present
- Country: United Kingdom
- Branch: British Army
- Role: Administration and training
- Size: Division
- Garrison/HQ: Wellington Barracks, London

The Guards and Parachute Division is an administrative unit of the British Army responsible for the training and administration of the regiments of Foot Guards and the Parachute Regiment. The division is responsible for providing two battalions for public duties to London District (plus five incremental companies); although the guards are most associated with ceremony, they are nevertheless operational infantry battalions, and as such perform all the various roles of infantry.

== History ==
As part of the Future Soldier reforms of the Army announced by the government in March 2021, the infantry was to be reorganised, with the intention of bringing all infantry regiments under the administration of a division of infantry. As part of this, the Guards Division, which was the administrative organisation responsible for the regiments of foot guards, was to be expanded to also assume responsibility for the Parachute Regiment, which had previously been an independent formation. The new division, to be named as the Guards and Parachute Division, was stood up on 30 September 2022.

== Current units ==
The division as stood up incorporates a total of ten infantry battalions - eight of these are part of the regular army, while the other two form part of the Army Reserve. In addition, there are five incremental companies which form integral parts of their parent regiments and whose primary task is public duties:

- 1st Battalion, Grenadier Guards
- Nijmegen Company, Grenadier Guards (Note: The incremental companies maintain the traditions of each regiment's 2nd Battalion)
- 1st Battalion, Coldstream Guards
- No. 7 Company, Coldstream Guards
- 1st Battalion, Scots Guards
- F Company, Scots Guards
- 1st Battalion, Irish Guards
- No. 9 Company, Irish Guards
- No. 12 Company, Irish Guards
- 1st Battalion, Welsh Guards
- 1st Battalion, The Parachute Regiment
- 2nd Battalion, The Parachute Regiment
- 3rd Battalion, The Parachute Regiment
- 1st Battalion, The Rangers (Note: 1st Battalion, The Rangers previously held the identity of 1st Battalion, The Royal Regiment of Scotland)
- 1st Battalion, London Guards (Note: The London Guards administers the reserve companies of the Grenadier Guards, Coldstream Guards, Scots Guards and Irish Guards.)
- 4th Battalion, The Parachute Regiment

Another element of Future Soldier saw the formation of a new unit, The Rangers - as part of its formation, it was announced that each of its four battalions would be assigned to one of the divisions of infantry. This saw the 1st Battalion (formerly the Royal Scots Borderers, 1st Battalion, The Royal Regiment of Scotland) assigned to the Guards and Parachute Division.

One of the platoons of 3rd Battalion, The Parachute Regiment is manned exclusively by soldiers drawn from either the foot guards or the Household Cavalry.

=== Bands ===
Each of the regiments that form part of the Guards and Parachute Division has a regimental band - these come under the control of the Royal Corps of Army Music, but form part of each unit's regimental family.

- Band of the Grenadier Guards
- Band of the Coldstream Guards
- Band of the Scots Guards
- Band of the Irish Guards
- Band of the Welsh Guards
- Band of the Parachute Regiment (Note: The Band of the Parachute Regiment was amalgamated in 2019 with the Band of the Army Air Corps and the Band of the Queen's Division to form the British Army Band Colchester)
