= Union Division =

British Army administrative unit

The Union Division is an administrative unit of the British Army responsible for the training and administration of regiments of line infantry.

== History ==
As part of the Future Soldier reforms of the Army announced by the government in March 2021, the infantry was to be reorganised, with the intention of bringing all infantry regiments under the administration of a division of infantry. As part of this, the Scottish, Welsh and Irish Division, which was the administrative organisation responsible for line infantry regiments from Scotland, Wales and Northern Ireland, was to be expanded to also assume responsibility for the Royal Yorkshire Regiment, which had previously been part of the King's Division. The new division, which was named as the Union Division, was stood up on 30 September 2022.

== Current units ==
The division as stood up incorporates a total of thirteen infantry battalions - eight of these are part of the regular army, while the other five form part of the Army Reserve. In addition, there is a single incremental company, whose primary task is public duties:

- The Royal Highland Fusiliers, 2nd Battalion, The Royal Regiment of Scotland
- The Black Watch, 3rd Battalion, The Royal Regiment of Scotland
- The Highlanders, 4th Battalion, The Royal Regiment of Scotland
- Balaklava Company, 5th Battalion, The Royal Regiment of Scotland (Note: The incremental company maintain the traditions of the 5th Battalion)
- 1st Battalion, The Royal Yorkshire Regiment (14th/15th, 19th and 33rd/76th Foot)
- 2nd Battalion, The Royal Yorkshire Regiment (14th/15th, 19th and 33rd/76th Foot)
- 1st Battalion, The Royal Welsh
- 1st Battalion, The Royal Irish Regiment (27th (Inniskilling), 83rd, 87th and Ulster Defence Regiment)
- 52nd Lowland, 6th Battalion, The Royal Regiment of Scotland
- 51st Highland, 7th Battalion, The Royal Regiment of Scotland
- 4th Battalion, The Royal Yorkshire Regiment (14th/15th, 19th and 33rd/76th Foot)
- 3rd Battalion, The Royal Welsh
- 2nd Battalion, The Royal Irish Regiment (27th (Inniskilling), 83rd, 87th and Ulster Defence Regiment)

As part of Future Soldier a new unit, The Rangers, was formed- as part of its formation, it was announced that each of its four battalions would be assigned to one of the divisions of infantry. This saw the 2nd Battalion (formerly the 2nd Battalion, Princess of Wales's Royal Regiment (Queen's and Royal Hampshires)) assigned to the Union Division.

=== Bands ===
The Royal Regiment of Scotland has its own regular army regimental band that falls under the control of the Royal Corps of Army Music. However, each of the regiments that form the Union Division also maintain a number of Army Reserve bands that are responsible directly to the regimental or battalion headquarters.

- Band of the Royal Regiment of Scotland (regular)
- Lowland Band of the Royal Regiment of Scotland
- Highland Band of the Royal Regiment of Scotland
- Band of the Royal Yorkshire Regiment
- Band of the Royal Welsh
- Band of the Royal Irish Regiment
