= Armed forces in Scotland =

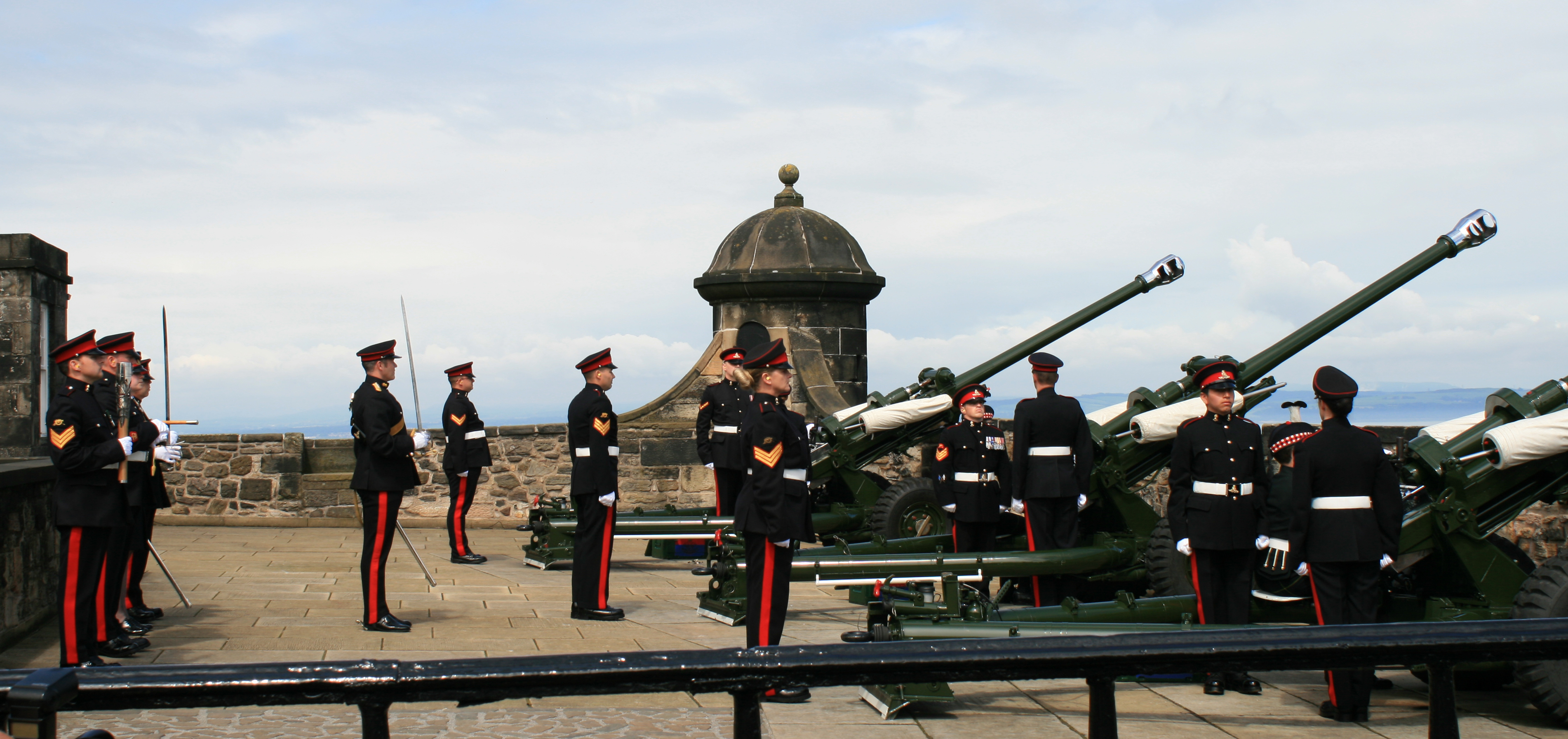
Soldiers of the 105th Regiment Royal Artillery at Edinburgh Castle

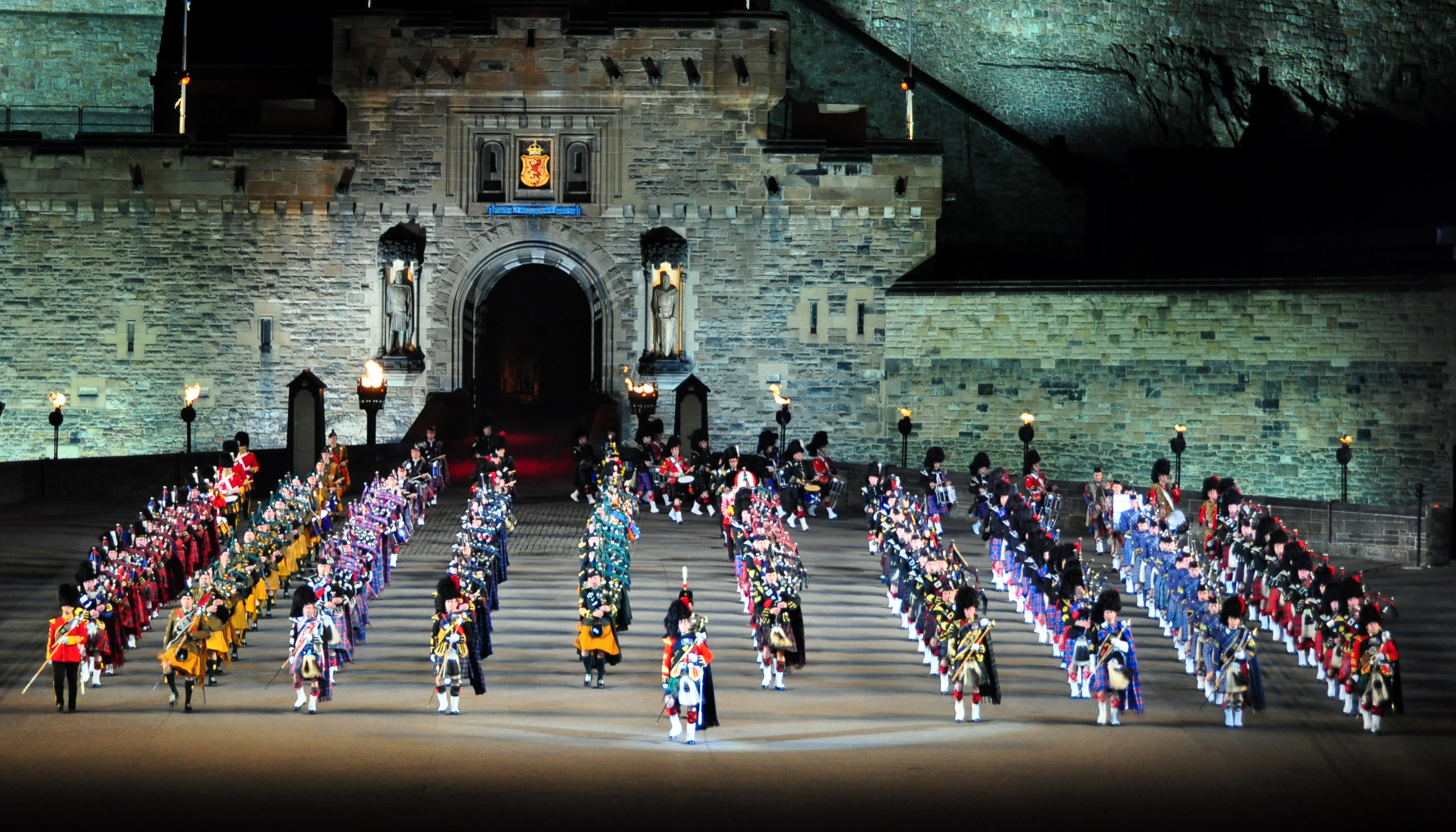
Royal Edinburgh Military Tattoo

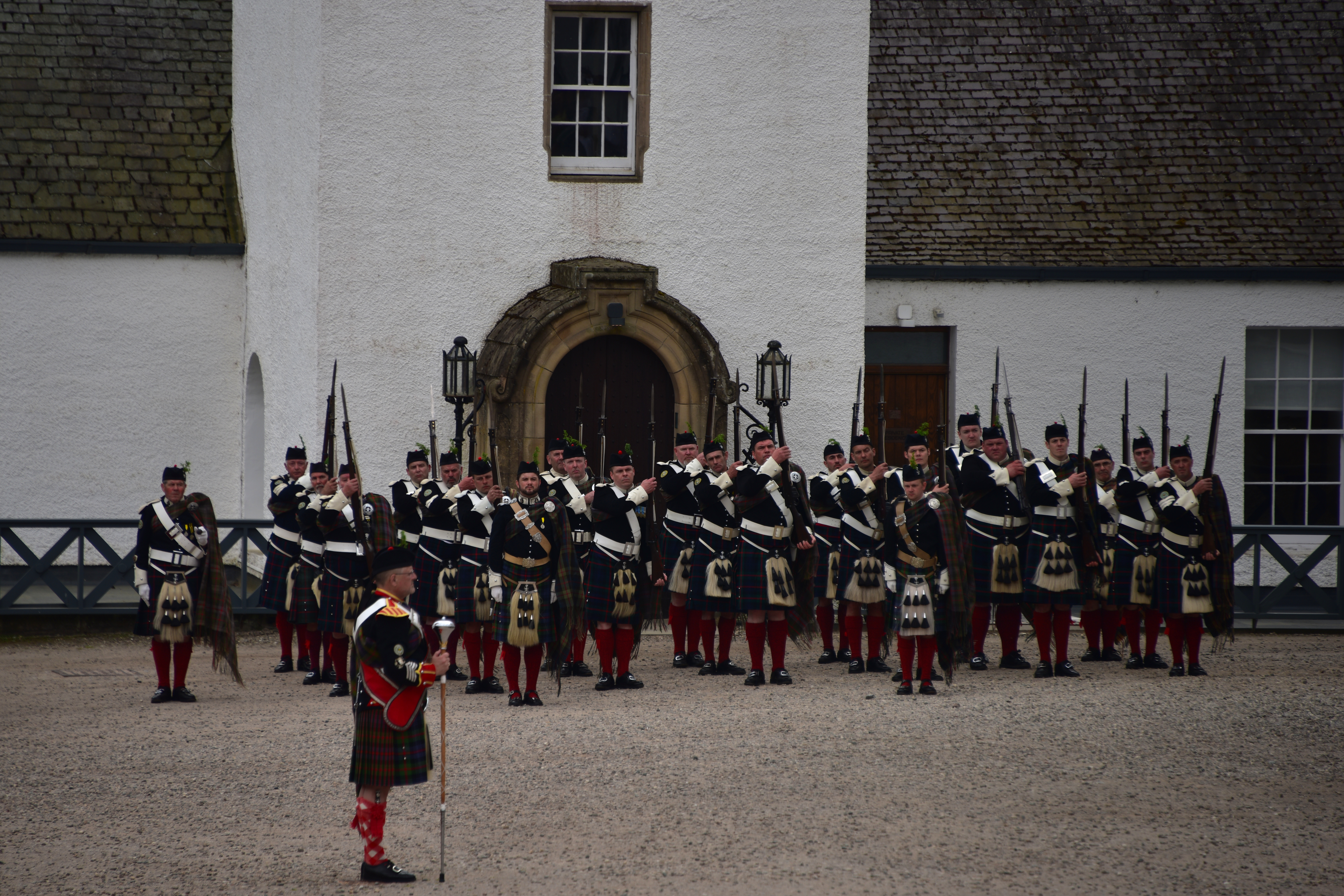
The Atholl Highlanders on parade in 2017, Europe's only private serving army

Since the passing of the Treaty of Union in 1707 which unified the Kingdom of Scotland with the Kingdom of England to the create the Kingdom of Great Britain, Scottish armed forces were merged with the English armed forces and remain part of the overall British Armed Forces.

The British Armed Forces presence in Scotland include military bases and units based in or associated with the country from all three services; The British Army (regular and Army Reserve), the Royal Air Force (RAF) and the Royal Navy. Roughly there are 11,100 Scottish soldiers part of the Regular Armed Forces, 4,000 Ministry of Defence civilian personnel, 2,200 Volunteer Reserves. By 2020, Scotland's Regular Armed Forces personnel was expected to rise to 12,500, whilst the number of Trained Volunteer Reserves was projected to increase to 4,250. In 2014, the total number of army personnel in Scotland was 17,300.

Scotland's geographical proximity to the North Atlantic and the High North make it an important component of the overall United Kingdom's defence and security. Military bases in Scotland, including RAF Lossiemouth and HMNB Clyde are significant to the North Atlantic Treaty Organisation (NATO) northward defence. The country is home to 113 military establishments, including the United Kingdom's Trident nuclear power programme, Cape Wrath which is the only naval gunfire and firing range in the UK, the Benbecula live fire range for the Multiple Launch Rocket System and a NATO exercise area in Galloway Forest.

From 2020, Scotland is home to one of only three Royal Navy main bases whereby all submarines of the Royal Navy are based in Scotland, one of the seven Adaptable Force Brigades of the British Army and a Royal Air Force fast jet main operating base.

== History ==
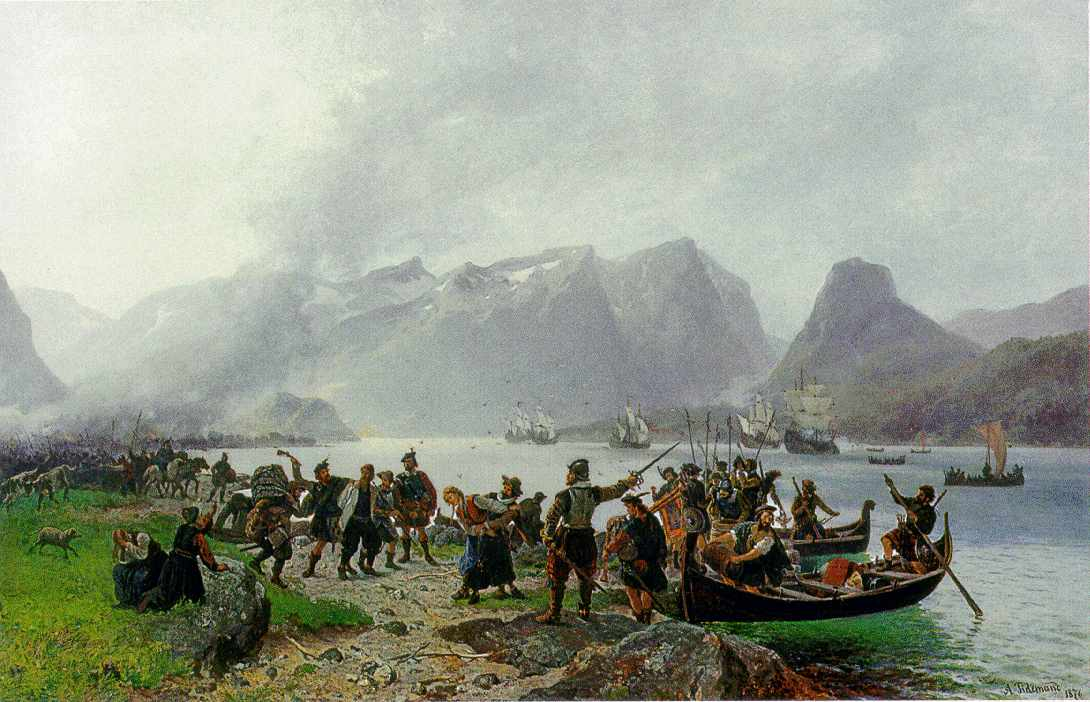
A depiction of Scottish mercenaries landing in Norway in 1612

=== Kingdom of Scotland ===
In 1262, the Kingdom of Scotland invaded Norway beginning a war which lasted until 1266 and resulted in the Treaty of Perth. Conflict between Scotland and Norway began over disagreements of who controlled the Hebrides off the coast of Scotland, however, Scotland later recognised Norwegian sovereignty over both Shetland and Orkney, purchasing the islands from Norway for a sum of 4,000 marks. Under the terms of the Treaty of Perth, Norway acknowledged Scottish sovereignty over territory it had disputed with Scotland. The payment was paid over the course of subsequent decades, until its cancellation as part of the agreement for the marriage of James III of Scotland and Margaret of Denmark, Queen of Scotland in 1469.

Before relinquishing its independence in 1707, the Kingdom of Scotland was an independent sovereign state and over the course of its history had engaged in various military battles with the Kingdom of England, particularly over the issue of the Wars of Scottish Independence. The First War of Scottish Independence began following the English invasion of Scotland in 1296 until the de jure restoration of Scottish independence with the Treaty of Edinburgh–Northampton in 1328, lasting a total of thirty-two years. De facto independence was established in 1314 at the Battle of Bannockburn. The wars were caused by the attempts of the English kings to establish their authority over Scotland, while the Scots fought to keep English rule and authority out of Scotland.

A second war between the Kingdom of Scotland and the Kingdom of England began in 1332 following the invasion of Scotland by Edward Balliol and lasted until 1357. The King of England, Edward III, invaded Scotland in 1333 and besieged the important trading town of Berwick. A large Scottish army attempted to relieve it but was heavily defeated at the Battle of Halidon Hill. Scotland had established an alliance with the Kingdom of France, known as the Auld Alliance. France was unhappy about an English expansion into Scotland and so covertly supported and financed the loyalists of David II of Scotland. Allies of John Balliol fell out among themselves and Balliol lost control of most of Scotland by late 1334. In early 1335, the French attempted to broker a peace but failed. Further French-sponsored peace talks failed in 1336 and by May 1337, King Philip VI of France engineered a clear break between France and England, starting the Hundred Years' War.

=== Scots Army ===
The Royal Coat of Arms of the Kingdom of Scotland (1660-1689)

Prior to the Treaty of Union 1707, the Kingdom of Scotland's army was the Scots Army and their navy was the Royal Scots Navy. At the Restoration in 1660 the Privy Council of Scotland established a force of several infantry regiments and a few troops of horse to act as a standing army. These included a troop of Life Guards, a second troop of which was raised in 1661, Lieutenant-general William Drummond's Regiment of Horse, five independent troops of horse, a regiment of Foot Guards, later known as the Scots Guards and Le Regiment de Douglas, formed and serving in France since 1633, which returned and eventually became the Royal Regiment of Foot.

There were also attempts to found a national militia of 20,000 foot and 2,000 horse on the English model. The standing army was mainly employed in suppressing Covenanter rebellions and the guerrilla war waged by the Cameronians in the East. In addition, a "Foote Company of Highland Men" was raised and three troops of Scots Dragoons in 1678. Another three were added to make The Royal Regiment of Scots Dragoons in 1681, by which point they were already mounted on grey horses that would give them their name of the Royal Scots Greys. On the eve of the Glorious Revolution the standing army in Scotland was about 3,000 men in various regiments and another 268 veterans in the major garrison towns, at an annual cost of about £80,000.

=== Treaty of Union ===
Under the terms of the Treaty of Union between the Kingdom of Scotland and the Kingdom of England, the Scots Army was integrated with the English army. It became part of the British Armed Forces. Following a referendum on devolution for Scotland in 1997, a Scottish Parliament was re–established together with an executive which operate under the Scotland Act 1998.

Defence and national security remain reserved matters under the Scotland Act 1998 which mean they are the overall responsibility of the UK parliament and reserved matters are set out in schedule 5 of the Scotland Act 1998. The UK Government claims that Scotland's geography, and military capabilities is essential for the UK and NATO's defence and security in the North Atlantic and the High North. The UK government identified the following factors that may influence priorities in these regions;

- Increasing Russian hostilities
- Chinese interest in Arctic politics
- New sea routes & traffic (including new routes opened by retreating ice)
- Resource competition
- Vulnerability of offshore and subsea infrastructure e.g. 2022 Nord Stream pipeline sabotage

The UK Government pledged to increase the regular armed forces to 12,500 by 2020, which has not been met and has thus been criticised by the Scottish Government.

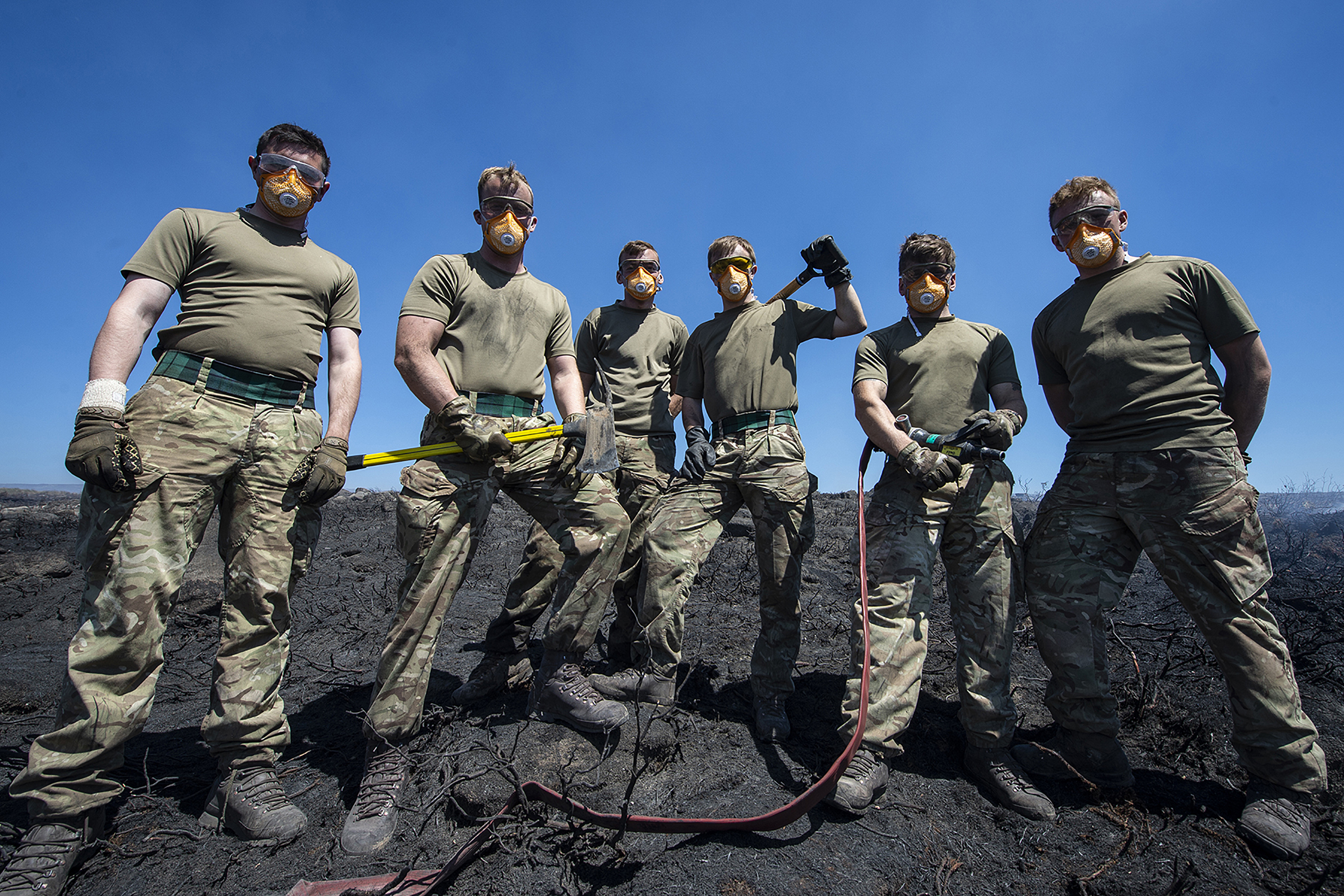
Soldiers of the Royal Regiment of Scotland

The Scottish government argues that Westminster's commitment to nuclear weapons has weakened other aspects of Scottish defence, and that Trident renewal will reduce funding for conventional equipment and the number of service personnel. They also claim that "cost overruns are endemic and major projects have been significantly delayed" and use the example of two aircraft carriers built before the availability of aircraft for them.

Today, the Royal Regiment of Scotland – the most senior and only Scottish regiment line infantry of the British Army – consists of several infantry battalions, namely, the Royal Highland Fusiliers (2 SCOTS), the Black Watch (3 SCOTS), the Highlanders (Seaforth, Gordons and Camerons) (4 SCOTS), and the Balaklava Company, Argyll and Sutherland Highlanders (5 SCOTS). The reserve battalions include the 52nd Lowland Volunteers, 6th Battalion (6 SCOTS), the 51st Highland Volunteers, 7th Battalion (7 SCOTS), the Band of the Royal Regiment of Scotland and the Lowland Band of the Royal Regiment of Scotland. The Royal Scots Borderers (1 SCOTS) was disbanded in 2021, with its personnel forming the 1st Battalion of the newly formed Ranger Regiment (1 RANGERS).

The Scots Guards is one of the five Foot Guards regiments of the British Army. Its origins are as the personal bodyguard of King Charles I of England and Scotland.

=== Scottish Government role ===
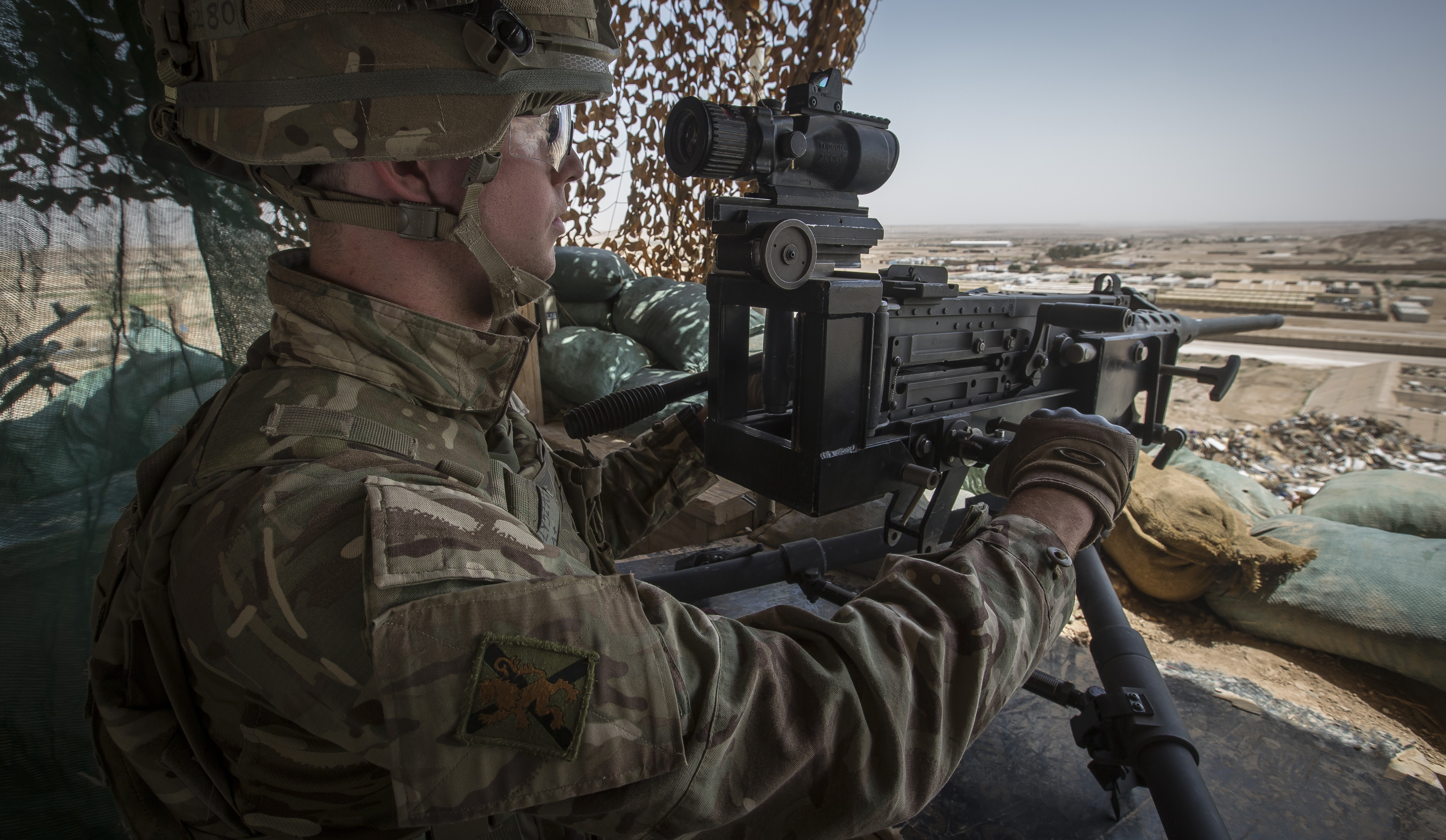
Black Watch (3 SCOTS) soldier at Al Asad Air Base, during Operation Inherent Resolve

Whilst defence and security remain a reserved matter to the UK Government under the terms of the Scotland Act 1998, the Scottish Government does have a role to play in terms of supporting Scotland's military personnel and veterans.

The Scottish Government advocates that it "aims to put the needs of the armed forces and veterans community at the forefront of policy thinking, development and delivery" as it "recognises the sacrifice of the armed forces, veterans and their families". A junior ministerial post was created in the Scottish Government under First Minister Humza Yousaf.

The Minister for Veterans provides an update to the Scottish Parliament annually on the governments work relating to community support for Scotland's personnel and veterans. The Minister for Veterans is responsible for ensuring Scottish Government support is in place for veterans and currently serving personnel.

The main objectives of the Scottish Government through its policy approach to supporting Scottish military personnel and veterans are:

- to ensure no individual faces disadvantage if they are either current service personnel or veterans, and their families in Scotland can access public services and support
- that Scotland is viewed as a ‘destination of choice’ for service leavers and their families
- to provide substantial and visible Scottish Government support and services for the armed forces community

=== Independence ===
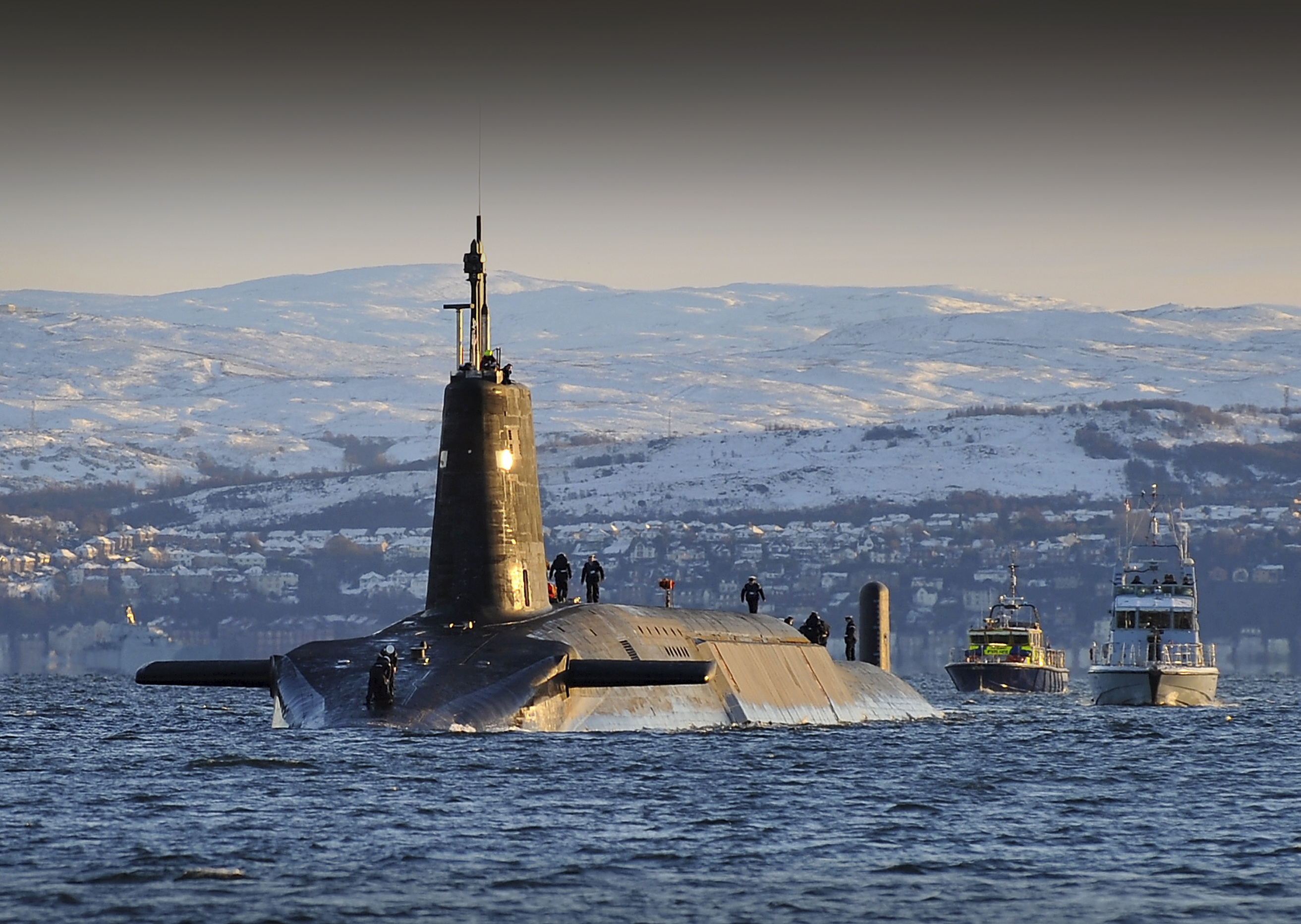
The SNP–led Scottish Government campaigns for the removal of Trident from HMNB Clyde on the Gare Loch

In the event of Scotland regaining its independence, the Scottish Government would establish a Scottish Armed Forces and work with the UK Government for the transfer of defence personnel to the newly established Scottish armed forces. The Scottish Government would conduct a Defence and Security Review to examine the components required for defence and security of an independent Scotland. The Scottish Government has long advocated for the removal of nuclear weapons from Scotland, such as the Trident nuclear programme. It is proposed the make up of the Scottish Armed Forces would include land, sea and air components which the creation of a new Joint Forces Headquarters would oversee. The Scottish Security and Intelligence Agency would serve as the security and intelligence body of the Scottish Government.

The Scottish Government advocates that an independent Scotland join the North Atlantic Treaty Organisation (NATO) and would begin discussions and negotiations with NATO and its member states on Scotland's accession. An independent Scotland would commit 2% of its Gross Domestic Product (GDP) towards defence spending in accordance with the commitment from NATO to invest in defence capabilities. Additionally, the Scottish Government supports membership of the European Union (EU) for an independent Scotland and, as such, would participate in the Common Security and Defence Policy of the EU. Following independence, the Scottish Government pledges the continuation of a robust and strong partnership between the Scottish and British Armed Forces, along with the Republic of Ireland, towards the security and protection of the wider British Isles.

In 2024, the Scottish Government's Cabinet Secretary for Constitution, External Affairs and Culture, Angus Robertson, confirmed that an independent Scotland would only involve itself in international overseas operations that "were lawful" and if any military action was supported by both the cabinet of the government and the Scottish Parliament.

== Overview of Scottish military ==
=== Presence ===
The military presence in Scotland as of 2021 consisted of the following:

- 10,440 Regular Armed Forces personnel
- 5,320 Reserve Personnel
- 4,030 Civilian Personnel

As of April 2021, the Regular Armed Forces in Scotland included 3,790 in the Army, 4,270 in the Navy and 2,060 in the Air Force.

=== Expenditure ===
The following table lists the annual public expenditure allocated to Scotland from 2013/14 to 2021/22 according to the Office for National Statistics, and below is the Ministry of Defence (United Kingdom) expenditure in Scotland itself:

Year	2013/14	2014/15	2015/16	2016/17	2017/18	2018/19	2019/20	2020/21	2021/22
Allocated to Scotland £m (current price)	3,021	3,034	3,021	3,055	3,174	3,293	3,451	3,630	3,972
Spent in Scotland £m (% of UK spend)	1,316	1,407	1,523	1,585	1,649	1,758	2,066	1,989	2,010
Difference £m	1,705	1,627	1,498	1,470	1,525	1,535	1,385	1,641	1,962

=== Government policy ===
The UK government views the UK's defence as being "stronger and safer" with cooperative Scottish participation in the combined defence and security of the UK. The UK government claims for 2021/22 that defence spending per capita was £370 in Scotland and £310 for the whole of the UK.

In 2023, then First Minister Humza Yousaf said that an independent Scotland would aim to maintain 2% GDP defence spending to meet the NATO target.

== British Army ==
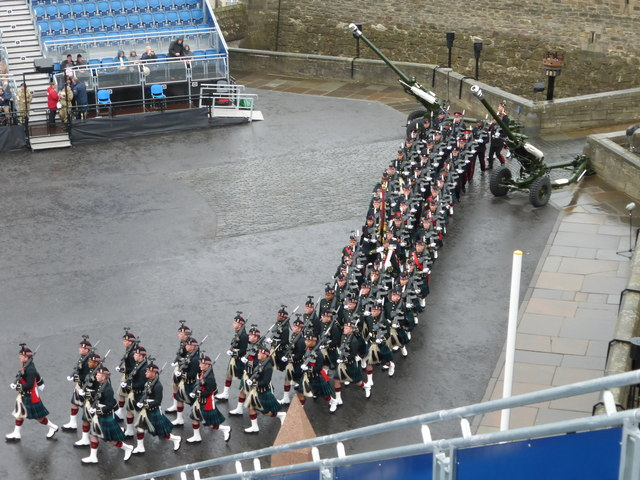
Royal Regiment of Scotland at Edinburgh Castle

The centre of Army operations in Scotland is Leuchars Station in Fife, the base for the Royal Scots Dragoon Guards, which also houses Royal Engineers, Royal Electrical and Mechanical Engineers, and Royal Military Police units. Robin Lindsay is the Military Secretary and General Officer Scotland.

=== Policy ===
In 2021, UK Defence Secretary Ben Wallace made a commitment that the number of battalions stationed in Scotland would increase from six to seven units and that the Army in Scotland would be a "greater proportion of the Army than today". He also said that Kinloss and Leuchars bases would be expanded.

Redford Barracks is set to close in 2029 and Fort George is set to close in 2032 as part of the UK government's Future Soldier plan.

The Black Watch battalion will relocate from Fort George barracks to Leuchars (both in Scotland) in 2029. This would mean closure of Fort George in 2029 rather than 2032 as originally planned and the return of the Black Watch to the traditional recruiting area of Tayside.

=== Scottish units ===
==== Units based in Scotland ====
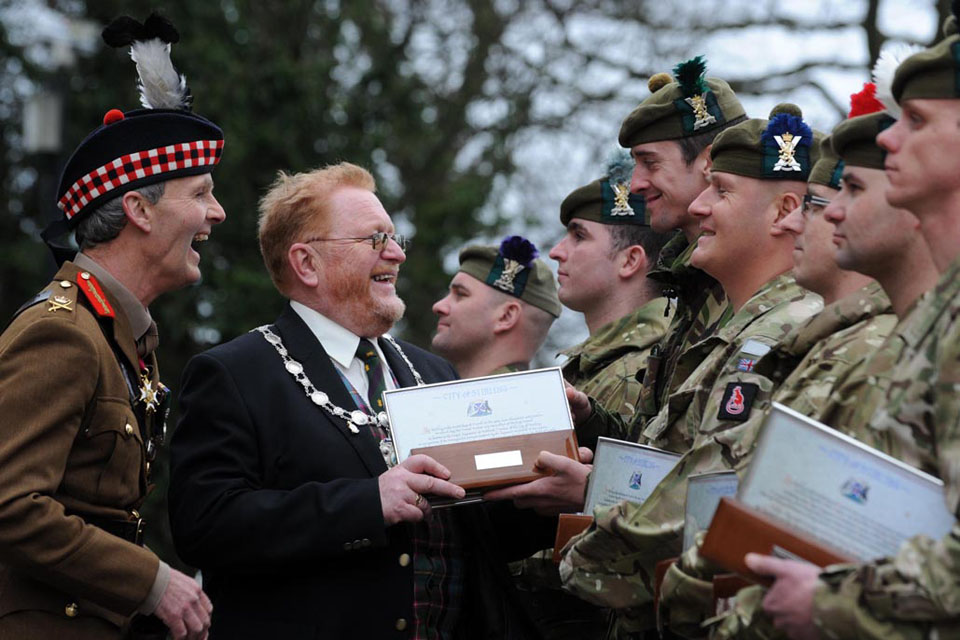
Royal Regiment of Scotland receives the Freedom of the City of Stirling

- Headquarters, 51st Infantry Brigade and Headquarters Scotland
- Royal Scots Dragoon Guards
- Scottish and North Irish Yeomanry
- Royal Regiment of Scotland: (Highland Fusiliers, Black Watch, Highlanders, Argyll and Sutherland Highlanders, 52nd Lowland Volunteers, 51st Highland Volunteers)
- A Company, 4th Battalion, the Parachute Regiment
- 105th Regiment Royal Artillery
- 32 Signal Regiment
- 154 (Scottish) Regiment RLC
- 71 Engineer Regiment (United Kingdom)
- 215 (Scottish) Multi-Role Medical Regiment
- 5 Military Intelligence Battalion(HQ Coy and 51 MI Coy only)

==== Units based in England ====
- Scots Guards
- 19th Regiment Royal Artillery

=== Barracks ===
- Edinburgh Castle - the army is responsible for the Barrack Block, GOC/Officers Mess, Royal Scots Headquarters, Royal Scots Museum, Royal Scots Dragoon Guards Museum, The Gunners house, Army Education Centre, Guardroom (part-shared with Historic Scotland).
- Kinloss Barracks
- Glencorse Barracks
- Dreghorn Barracks
- Cameron Barracks
- Leuchars Station
- Fort George, Highland (set to close in 2032)
- Redford Barracks (set to close in 2029)

=== Army Reserve centres ===
- Queen's Barracks

=== English units based in Scotland ===
- 3rd Battalion, The Rifles

=== British units based in Scotland ===
- Army Personnel Centre, Glasgow

== Royal Navy ==
=== Operations and policy ===
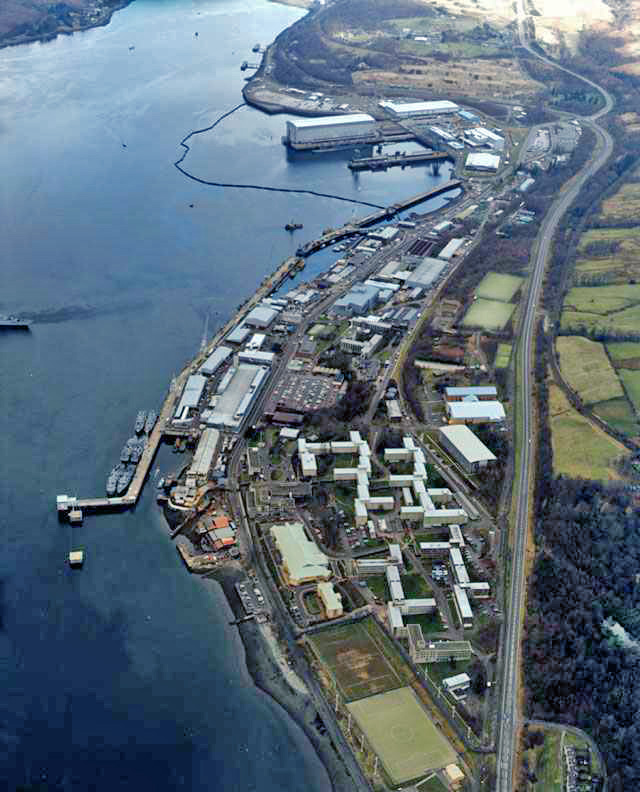
Faslane naval base is the headquarters of the Royal Navy in Scotland

His Majesty's Naval Base, Clyde, commonly known as Faslane, houses the nuclear-armed Vanguard 15 class submarines that form the "At-Sea Nuclear Deterrent". The base also houses the Astute Class of attack submarines and a frigate acting as a Towed Array Patrol ship operates that protect Trident-equipped submarines and perform anti-submarine activities.

Due to retreat of arctic ice, it is possible that maritime activity in the High North will increase with a further emphasis on RN activities from Scotland. This is made more likely by Russian emphasis on arctic naval activity.

==== Trident ====
The Scottish government and a cross-party majority in the Scottish Parliament is opposed to having nuclear weapons in Scotland. In the event of Scottish independence, which is supported by the Scottish government, the nuclear programme will be moved out of Scotland "at pace". The SNP have claimed that Scotland spends £180m annually on Trident alone, and so £180m would be saved each year with the removal of Trident and independence.

In the event of Scottish independence, the MOD of the UK's preferred option would be to move the at-sea nuclear deterrent base to Devonport naval base in Plymouth. The UK government has no plans to move Trident otherwise.

=== Bases & establishments ===
- HMNB Clyde (Faslane) including RNAD Coulport
- RM Condor
- HMS Dalriada
- British Underwater Test and Evaluation Centre (BUTEC)
- HMS Caledonia & HMS Scotia
- University Royal Naval Unit East Scotland
- University Royal Naval Unit Glasgow
- RAF Tain

== Royal Air Force ==
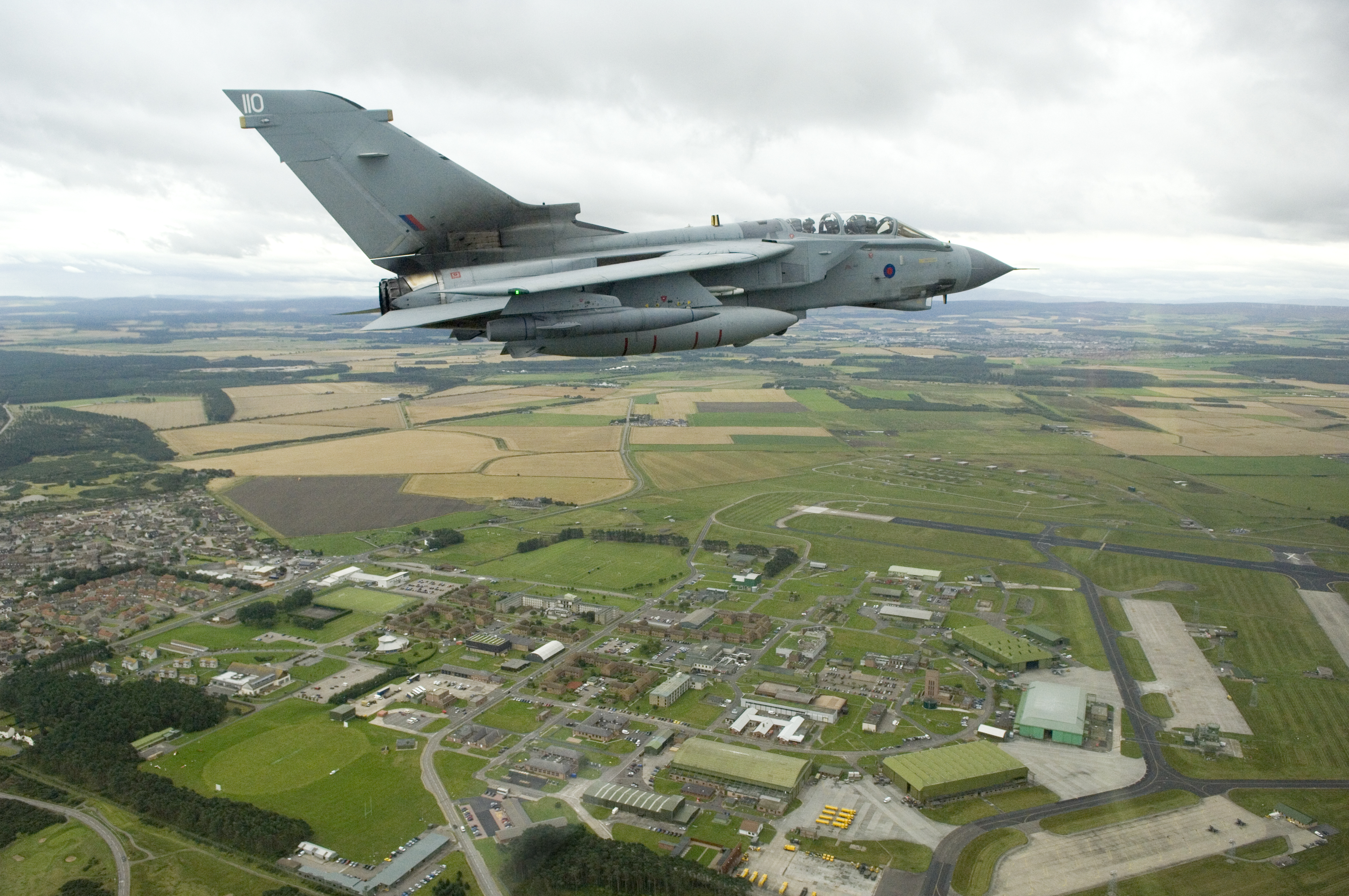
Lossiemouth air base

=== Operations and policy ===
RAF assets in Scotland operate in defence of the North Atlantic and the High North via; surveillance, anti-submarine warfare and Quick Reaction Alert jets from Lossiemouth base, which is the primary air base in Scotland. The Air Officer Scotland is Air-Vice Marshall Ross Paterson.

==== GIUK gap ====
Surveillance of the Greenland-Iceland-UK gap (GIUK gap) also occurs from Lossiemouth which contributes to Iceland's policing. The P-8A Poseidon maritime patrol aircraft is used in the GIUK gap and for anti-submarine warfare. Norwegian P-8As also use facilities at Lossiemouth, and the RAF also uses Norwegian bases. The Norwegian Ambassador says this provides cost savings and operational flexibility.

=== Stations ===
- RAF Kirknewton
- RAF Lossiemouth including: No. 1 Squadron RAF, No. 2 Squadron RAF, No. 6 Squadron RAF, No. 8 Squadron RAF, No. 9 Squadron RAF, No. 51 Squadron RAF Regiment, No. 120 Squadron RAF, No. 201 Squadron RAF, No. 2622 Squadron RAuxAF Regiment, 4 RAF Police Royal Air Force Mountain Rescue Service, Tain Air Weapons Range

=== Bases ===
- RRH Benbecula
- RRH Buchan
- RAF Saxa Vord
- Leuchars Diversion Airfield
- RAF Lossiemouth
- RAF Prestwick

== Exercises ==
Twice a year Exercise Joint Warrior utilises the Royal Navy, Royal Marines, Royal Air Force and British Army, in cooperation with forces from 13 other countries in order to test NATO's 'Very High Readiness' forces.

== Veterans ==
As of 2017, there were around 230,000 veterans living in Scotland.

The Scottish government's policy on supporting veterans has included:

- The appointment of the first-ever Scottish Veterans Commissioner in 2014
- A Scottish Government Armed Forces Advocate, and expansion of the Scottish Armed Forces and Veterans Champions network
- Over £1 million in direct support for projects and organisations that support veterans

== See also ==
- Military history of Scotland
