= Royal Regiment of Scotland =

Infantry regiment of the British Army

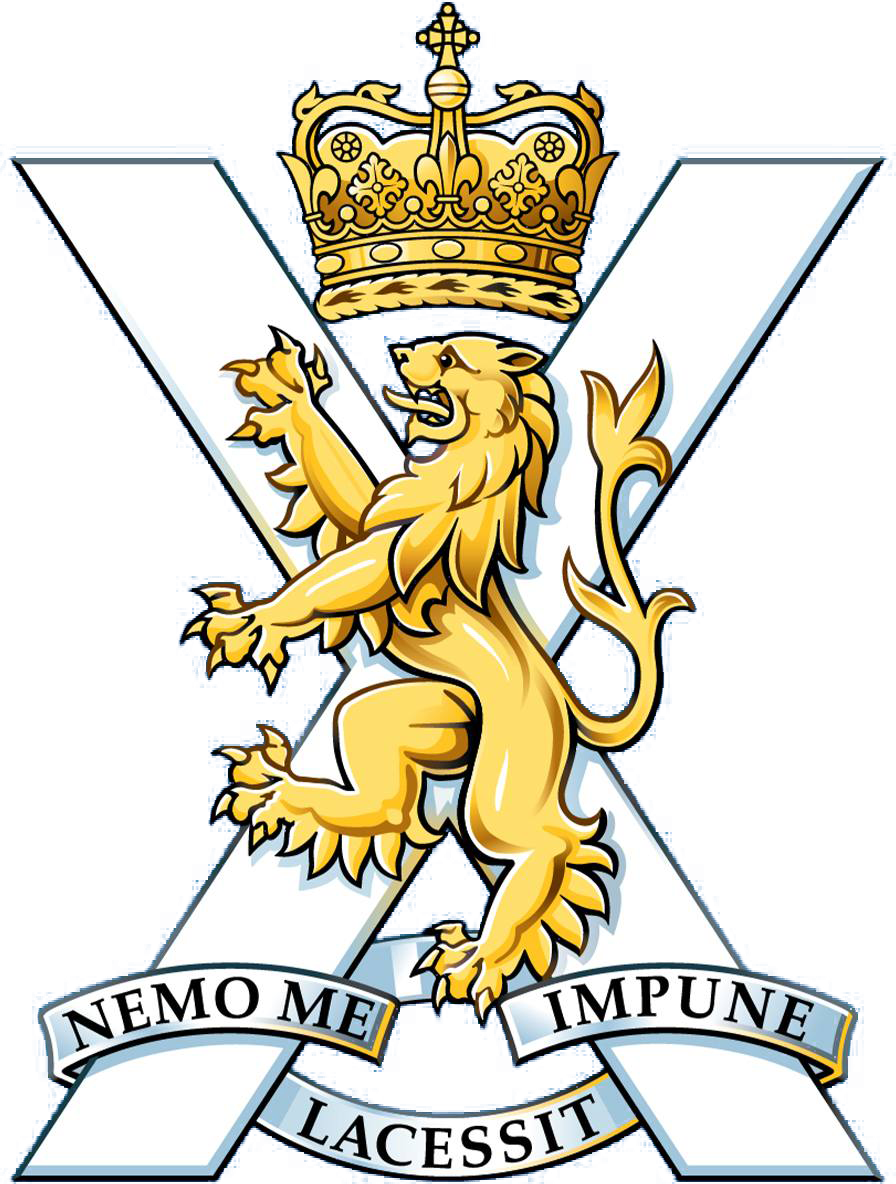
- Cap badge
- Active: 28 March 2006 – present
- Allegiance: United Kingdom
- Branch: British Army
- Type: Infantry
- Role: 2nd Battalion: Light Infantry; 3rd Battalion: Light Mechanised Infantry; 4th Battalion: Light Infantry; Balaklava Coy: Public duties 6th Battalion: Army Reserve; 7th Battalion: Army Reserve
- Size: Five battalions One reinforced company
- Part of: Union Division
- Garrison/HQ: RHQ: Edinburgh Castle; 2nd Battalion: Edinburgh; 3rd Battalion: Fort George; 4th Battalion: Dhekelia, Cyprus; Balaklava Company: Edinburgh; 6th Battalion: Glasgow; 7th Battalion: Perth
- Nicknames: "Scots" "The Jocks"
- Mottos: "Nemo Me Impune Lacessit" (Latin) "No One Provokes Me With Impunity"
- March: Quick: Scotland the Brave; Slow: Royal Regiment of Scotland Slow March (My Home, Mist Covered Mountains, Highland Cradle Song)
- Mascot: Cruachan IV (Shetland pony)
- Engagements: Operation Telic; Operation Herrick
- Website: www.army.mod.uk/who-we-are/corps-regiments-and-units/infantry/royal-regiment-of-scotland/

Commanders
- Colonel-in-Chief: King Charles III
- Colonel of the Regiment: Major-General Robin Lindsay

Insignia
- Tartan: Government 1A
- Hackle: Blackcock Feathers; From the Royal Scots and King's Own Scottish Borderers
- Abbreviation: SCOTS

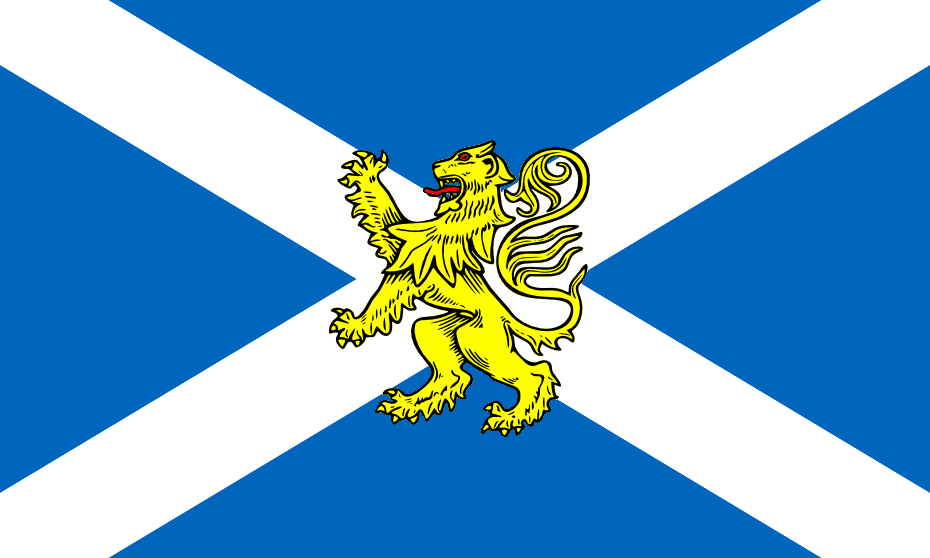
Regimental flag of the SCOTS

The Royal Regiment of Scotland (SCOTS) is the senior and only current Scottish line infantry regiment of the British Army Infantry. It consists of three regular (formerly five) and two reserve battalions, plus an incremental company, each formerly an individual regiment of the line. However, three regular battalions maintain their former regimental pipes and drums to carry on the traditions of their antecedent regiments.

== History ==
As part of restructuring in the British Army, the Royal Regiment of Scotland's creation was announced by Secretary of State for Defence Geoff Hoon in the House of Commons on 16 December 2004, after the merger of several regiments and the reduction in total regular infantry battalions from 40 to 36 was outlined in the defence white paper, Delivering Security in a Changing World, several months earlier.

The regiment consisted originally of a total of seven battalions: one of these was formed by the amalgamation of the Royal Scots and King's Own Scottish Borderers, while the others are each formed from one of the remaining single-battalion regiments of the Scottish Division. Of all of the new regiments formed following the announcement of 16 December 2004, the Royal Regiment of Scotland is the only one where the former regimental titles have been prominently retained with the new numbered battalion designations as subtitles. There is however a common regimental cap badge, tactical recognition flash (TRF), tartan, stable belt and Glengarry headdress but distinctively coloured hackles are also worn by each separate battalion on the tam o'shanter headdress to maintain their individual identity and the pipes and drums of each battalion continue to wear the ceremonial uniforms and tartans of their former regiments.

Along with the Rifles, the Royal Regiment of Scotland is also one of only two line infantry regiments to maintain its own regular military band within the Royal Corps of Army Music, which was formed through the amalgamation of the Highland band and Lowland band of the Scottish Division. In addition, there are two Army Reserve bands, the Highland Band and the Lowland Band of the Royal Regiment of Scotland, which are administered by the regiment's two Army Reserve battalions. The regiment also has previously had its own Parachute Display Team called the Golden Lions (disbanded in 2011) and shinty team, the Scots Shinty Club.

In 1948, every regiment of line infantry was reduced to a single battalion. The subsequent process of reducing the overall number of infantry regiments in the Army through disbandment or amalgamation of the traditional county regiments that were formalised in the Childers Reforms of 1881 to form larger multi-battalion regiments, has continued to affect most of the British Army Infantry since the 1957 Defence White Paper outlined the first mergers. The creation of the Royal Regiment of Scotland encountered considerable opposition amongst former soldiers, and nationalist groups.

The new regiment is also primarily a kilted one and there are concerns that the much older Lowland units, which traditionally wore trews, will be effectively absorbed into a Highland tradition. However, the Ministry of Defence's case that change was necessary to enhance operational efficiency through economies of scale, improve and create more flexible conditions of service and to resolve chronic recruiting and retention problems amongst the eight single-battalion Scottish regiments was endorsed by the then Chief of the General Staff, Sir Mike Jackson. Jackson delegated the decision on how the reduction of battalions would be achieved to the Council of Scottish Colonels. The Council recommended that the Royal Scots should be amalgamated with the King's Own Scottish Borderers reflecting the former regiment's long term poor recruiting record and high reliance on Commonwealth recruits.

The status of the Black Watch was particularly controversial. When the confirmed plan to amalgamate the regiments was announced, 1st Battalion The Black Watch was deployed away from Basra at Camp Dogwood in a relatively dangerous region of Iraq. Hoon was accused by the SNP of "stabbing the soldiers in the back" and being motivated purely by political and administrative concerns, with little regard to the effect on morale. This controversy was further exacerbated in the minds of some by the fact that the Colonel of the Black Watch, Lieutenant-General Alistair Irwin, was a member of the Army Board at the time that the options to change the size and structure of the infantry by forming large regiments, including to amalgamate regiments of the Scottish Division into a single regiment, were being considered in the Ministry of Defence and final decisions taken.

The regiment was initially formed of six regular and two territorial battalions on 28 March 2006. On 1 August 2006, the Royal Scots Battalion and King's Own Scottish Borderers Battalion were amalgamated into the 1st Battalion, Royal Scots Borderers, leaving the final regular roll of five regular battalions.

In 2012, as part of the Army 2020 programme, it was announced that the 5th Battalion, while not losing its name, connection and history as the Argyll and Sutherland Highlanders, would be reduced to the status of an incremental company, similar to the three companies in the Guards Division, and be transferred to become a permanent public duties unit in Scotland.

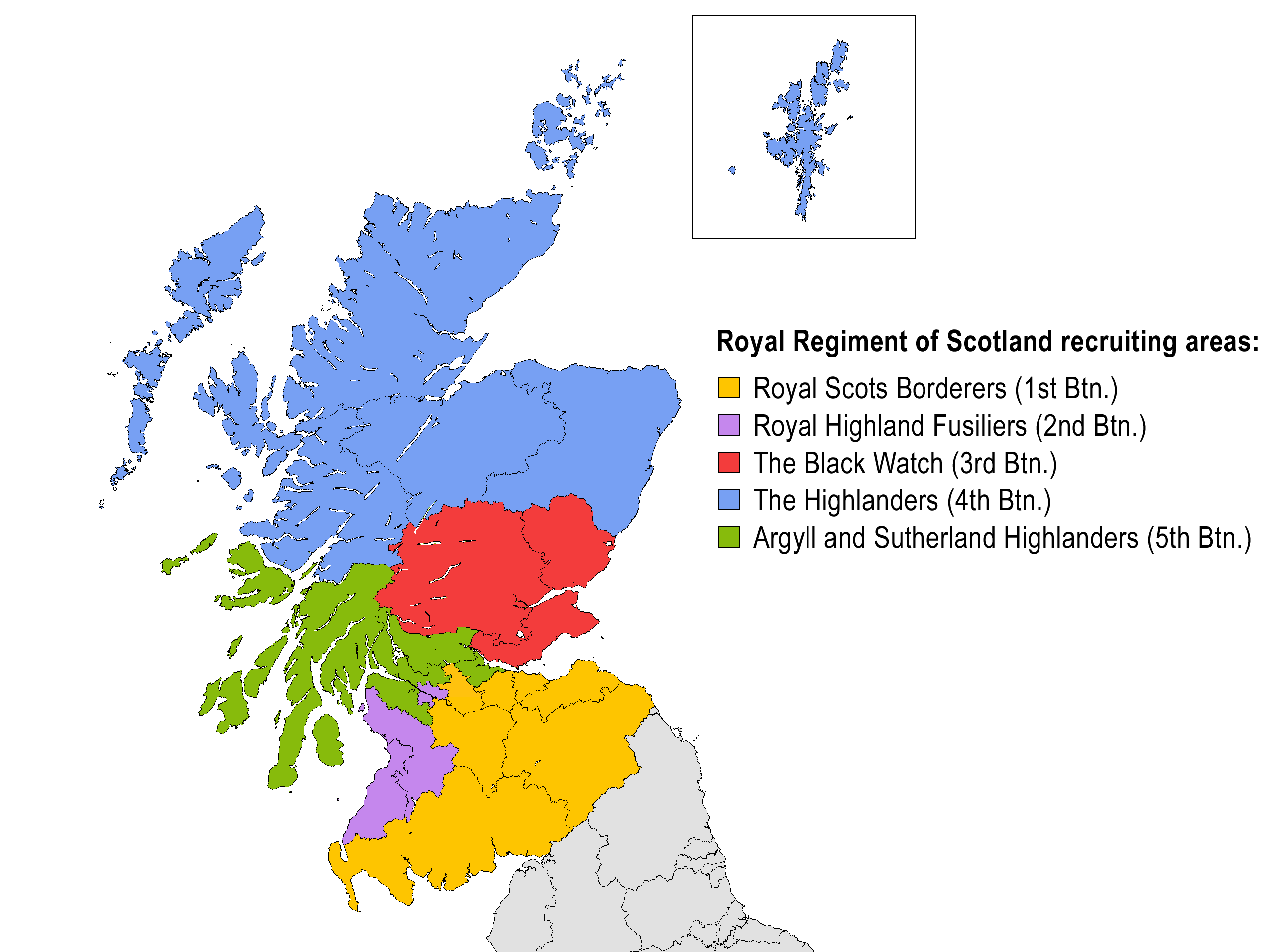
The traditional recruiting districts of the former five active regular battalions, a system originally introduced by the Cardwell Reforms in 1871. The Royal Scots Borderers, 1st Battalion, Royal Regiment of Scotland was disbanded in 2021.

On 1 December 2021, as part of the Future Soldier programme, the 1st Battalion (Royal Scots Borderers), was disbanded and subsequently reformed as part of the new Ranger Regiment and based in Northern Ireland.

== Organisation ==
All battalions in the Royal Regiment of Scotland, to preserve regional ties and former regimental identities, took the name of their former individual regiments. The order of battle is as follows:

- Regimental Headquarters Staff
  - Regimental Headquarters, Royal Regiment of Scotland, at Edinburgh Castle
    - 2 SCOTS Home HQ, at Glencorse Barracks, Penicuik, Midlothian
    - 3 SCOTS Home HQ, at Queen's Barracks, Perth
    - 4 SCOTS Home HQ, at Cameron Barracks, Inverness
    - 5 SCOTS Home HQ, at Forthside Barracks, Stirling
- Regular Battalions/Company
  - Royal Highland Fusiliers, 2nd Battalion Royal Regiment of Scotland, at Glencorse Barracks, Penicuik (Light Infantry) – 4th Infantry Brigade and Headquarters North East
  - Black Watch, 3rd Battalion Royal Regiment of Scotland, at Fort George, Inverness (Light Mechanised Infantry) – 51st Infantry Brigade and Headquarters Scotland
  - Highlanders, 4th Battalion Royal Regiment of Scotland, Dhekelia, Cyprus (Light infantry)
  - Balaklava Company, Argyll and Sutherland Highlanders 5th Battalion The Royal Regiment of Scotland, at Redford Barracks, Edinburgh (Public duties) – 51st Infantry Brigade and Headquarters Scotland
- Reserve Battalions
  - 52nd Lowland Volunteers, 6th Battalion Royal Regiment of Scotland (AR), at Walcheren Barracks, Glasgow (Light Infantry) — paired with 2 SCOTS – 4th Infantry Brigade and Headquarters North East
  - 51st Highland Volunteers, 7th Battalion Royal Regiment of Scotland (AR), at Queen's Barracks, Perth (Light Infantry) — paired with 3 SCOTS – 51st Infantry Brigade and Headquarters Scotland

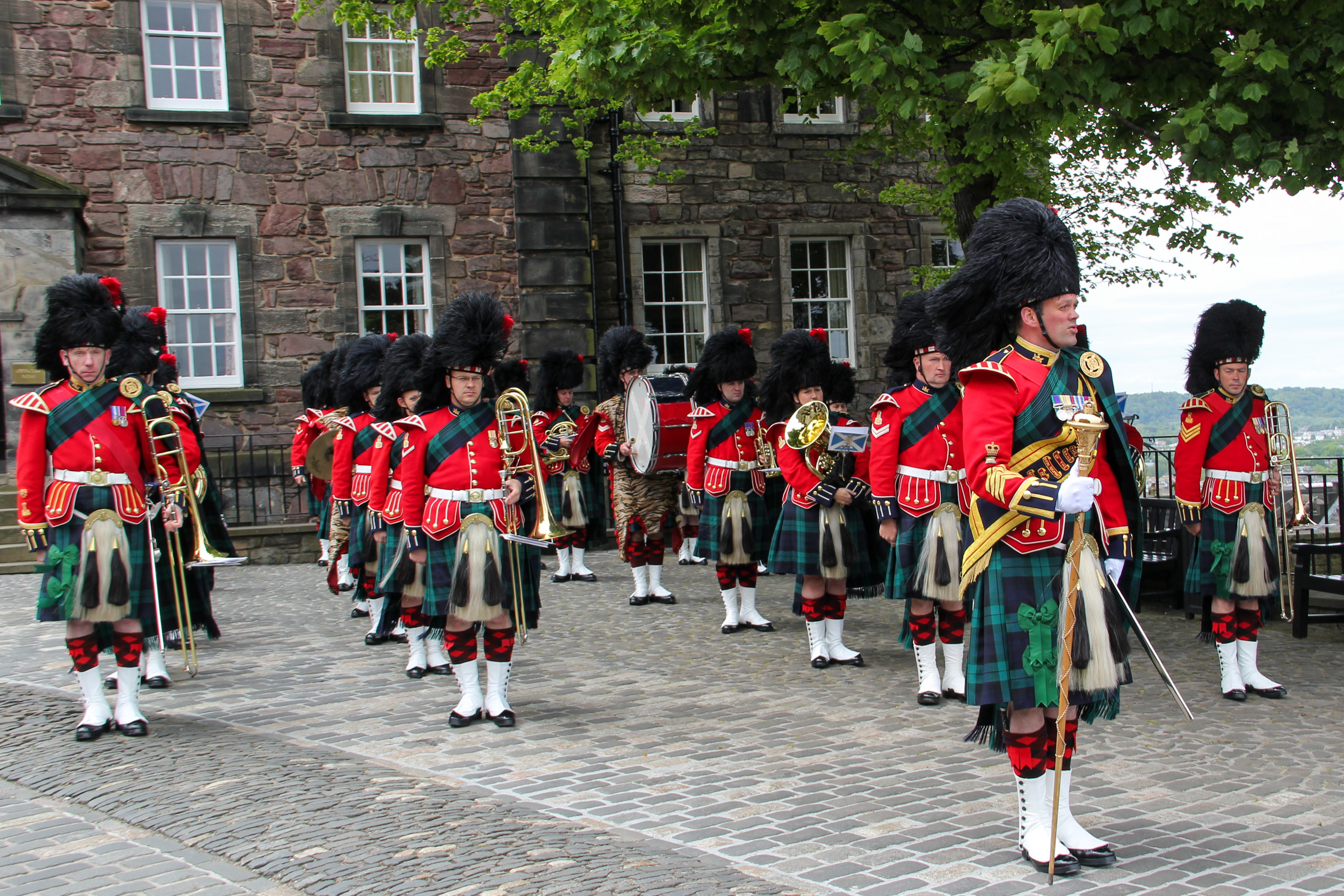
The Band of the Royal Regiment of Scotland at Edinburgh Castle

The regiment also currently has three military bands and four pipes and drums:

- Band of the Royal Regiment of Scotland, at Dreghorn Barracks, Edinburgh
- Lowland Band of the Royal Regiment of Scotland (Reserve) – Part of 6 SCOTS at East Claremont Street drill hall, Edinburgh
- Highland Band of the Royal Regiment of Scotland (Reserve) – Part of 7 SCOTS at Queen's Barracks, Perth
- Pipe Bands:
  - Pipes and Drums of the Royal Highland Fusiliers, 2nd Battalion, Royal Regiment of Scotland
  - Pipes and Drums of The Black Watch, 3rd Battalion, Royal Regiment of Scotland
  - Pipes and Drums of The Highlanders, 4th Battalion, Royal Regiment of Scotland
  - Pipes and Drums of 51st Highland, 7th Battalion, Royal Regiment of Scotland (Reserve)
- At the creation of the Regiment in 2006 there were five additional pipes and drums:
  - Pipes and Drums of 52nd Lowland, 6th Battalion, Royal Regiment of Scotland (Reserve). Disbanded in 2007.
  - Pipes and Drums of the Argyll and Sutherland Highlanders, 5th Battalion, Royal Regiment of Scotland. Disbanded in 2013, with the reduction of the 5th Battalion to Balaklava Company.
  - Pipes and Drums of the Royal Scots Borderers, 1st Battalion, Royal Regiment of Scotland. Disbanded February 2021.
    - Pipes and Drums of the Royal Scots, disbanded in August 2006 following merger into Royal Scots Borderers
    - Pipes and Drums of the King's Own Scottish Borderers, disbanded in August 2006 following merger into Royal Scots Borderers

The Band of the Royal Regiment of Scotland falls within the Royal Corps of Army Music. The reserve bands are administered by the Royal Corps of Army Music, though fall under the command of their respective battalions.

== Regimental museum ==
The Museum of the Royal Scots (The Royal Regiment) and the Royal Regiment of Scotland is in Edinburgh Castle. Operating as an independent museum, the exhibits include dioramas, uniforms, medals, weapons, drums, ceremonial regalia and silver. Displays focus on the regiment's activities since its founding up to contemporary Army life.

== Colonel-in-chief ==
The regiment's colonel-in-chief was Queen Elizabeth II, who was replaced by King Charles III. Princess Anne is the regiment's deputy colonel-in-chief. The colonels-in-chief of the constituent regiments making up the new regiment have become the Royal Colonels of their representative battalions:

- 2nd Battalion: vacant^1
- 3rd Battalion: King Charles III
- 4th Battalion: vacant^2
- 5th Battalion: vacant^1
- 6th Battalion: Anne, Princess Royal
- 7th Battalion: King Charles III

^1The position is vacant following the death of Queen Elizabeth II in September 2022.

^2The position is now vacant since Prince Philip's death in April 2021.

== Uniform and dress ==
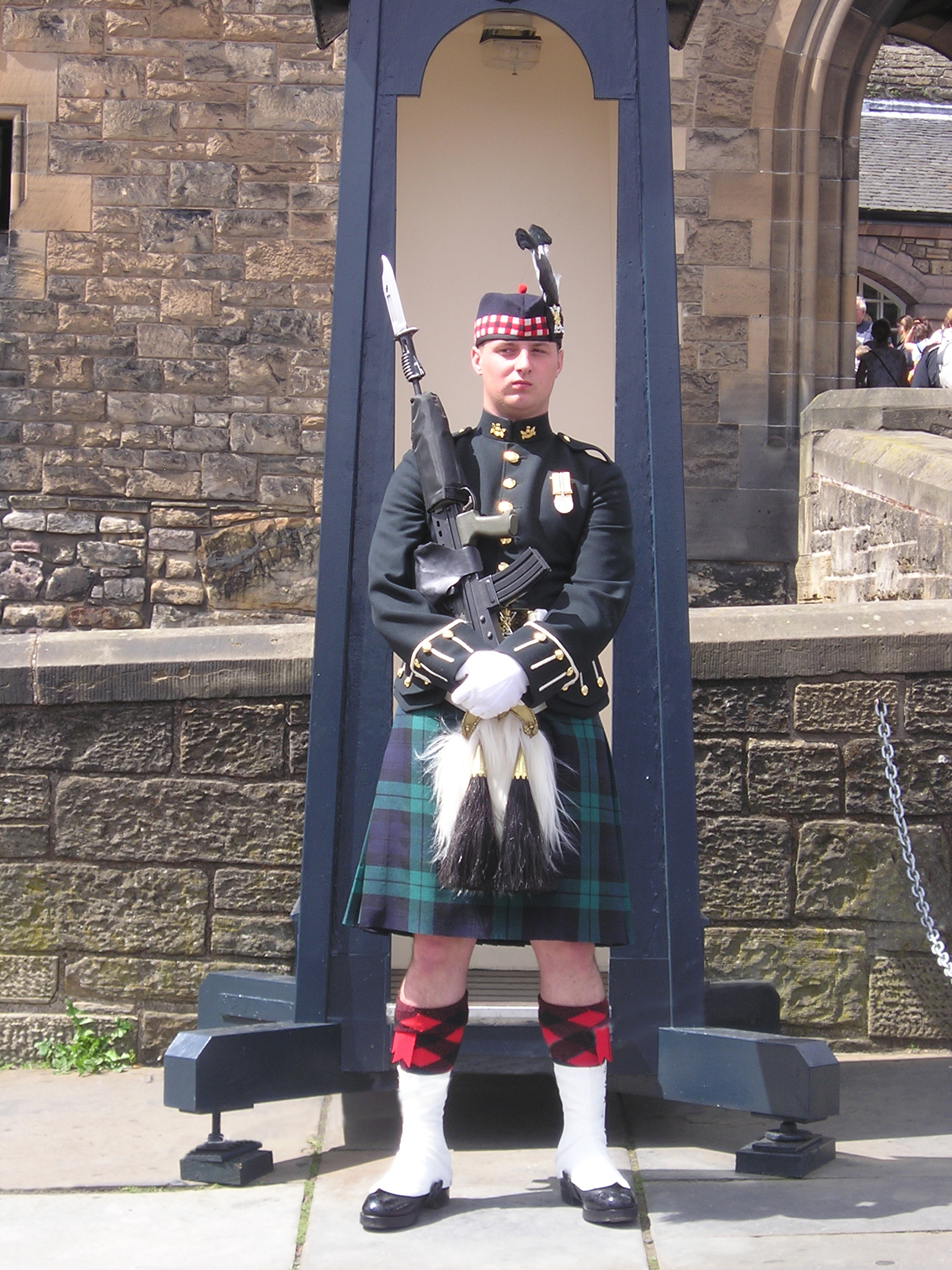
A Sentry of the Royal Regiment of Scotland, in No. 1 Dress, posted on the Esplanade at the entrance to Edinburgh Castle

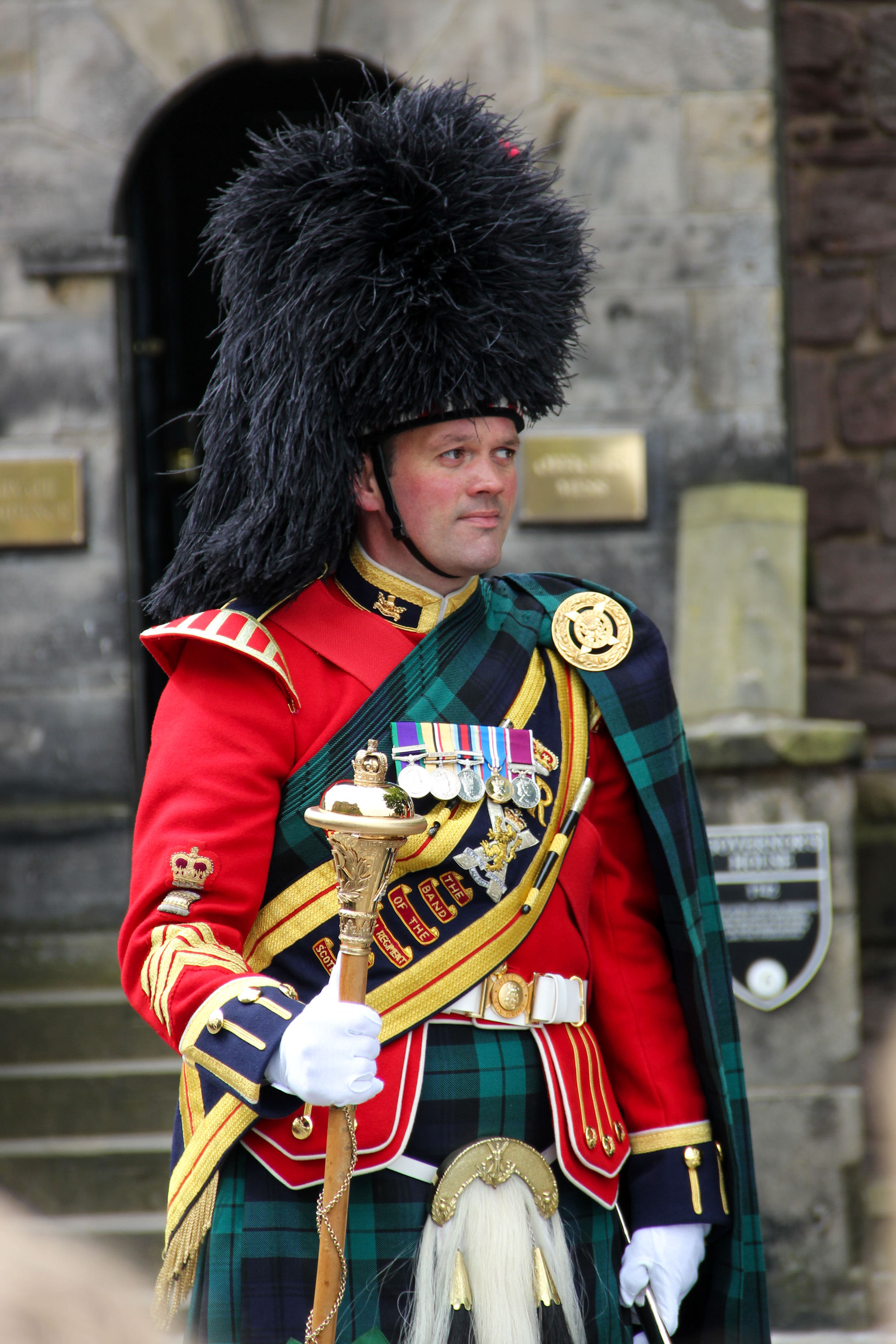
Drum major from the Band of the Royal Regiment of Scotland inside Edinburgh Castle

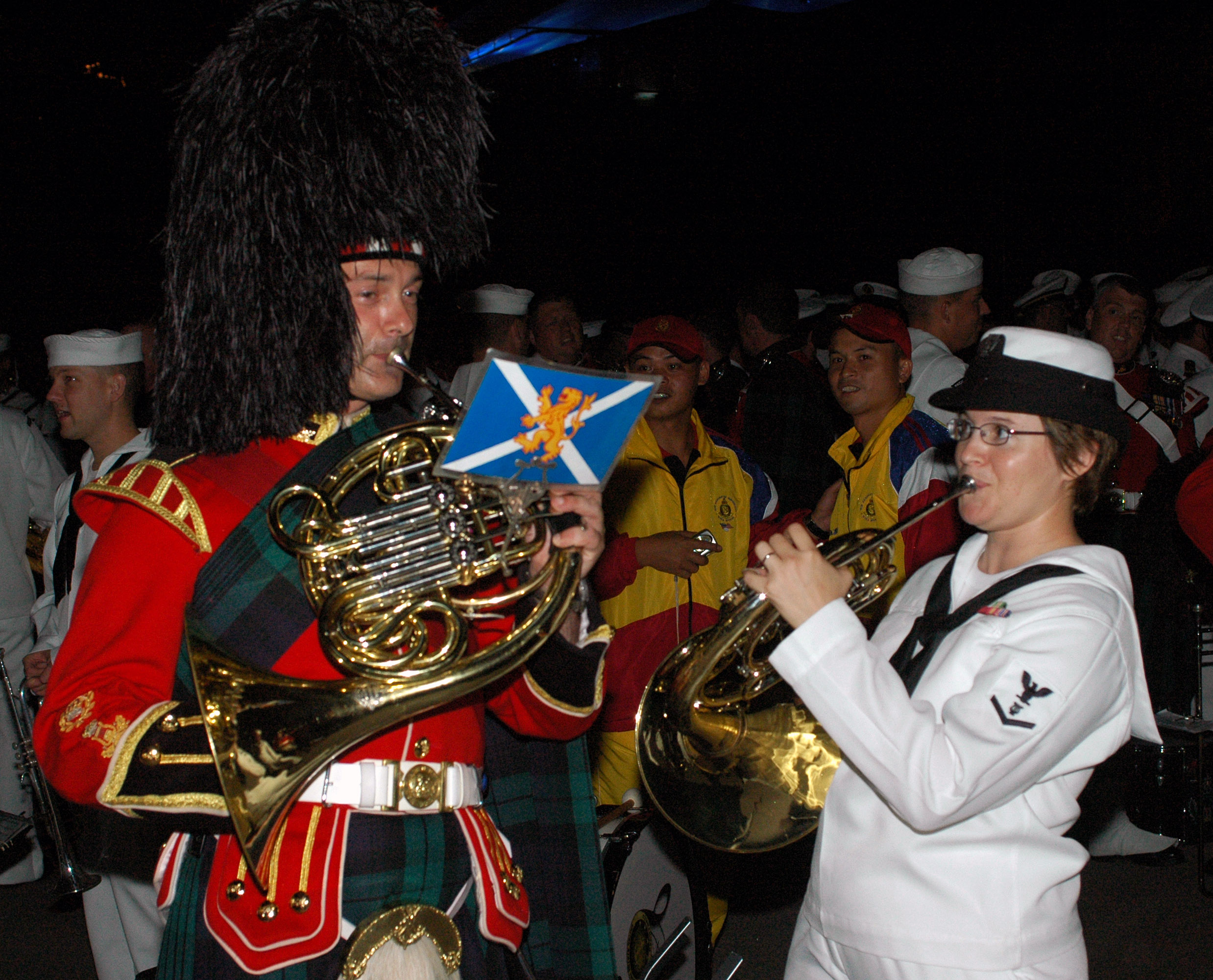
Musician from the Band of the Royal Regiment of Scotland in Full Dress uniform in Kuala Lumpur

=== Cap badge and motto ===
In August 2005, the new regimental cap badge was unveiled at the Edinburgh Military Tattoo. The design was the result of a collaborative effort, led by Brigadier Andrew Mackay, along with other serving and retired officers and Regimental Sergeant Majors, with advice from the Lord Lyon King of Arms. The new cap badge incorporates the Saltire of St Andrew and the Lion Rampant of the Royal Standard of Scotland, which are two prominent national symbols. The cap badge is surmounted by a crown, in this case the Crown of Scotland. The regiment's motto is Nemo Me Impune Lacessit (No One Assails Me With Impunity)—which is the motto of the Order of the Thistle, Scotland's highest order of chivalry, and was also the motto of four of the pre-existing Scottish regiments.

=== Dress ===
The new regiment's various Dress Uniforms incorporate a number of "golden threads" from the antecedent regiments. Some of the most prominent include:

- All battalions wear the Lowland pattern Glengarry, this pattern was in fact also common to the Seaforth Highlanders and Gordon Highlanders, as well as the Lowland Royal Highland Fusiliers, Royal Scots and King's Own Scottish Borderers regiments.
- In No. 1 and No. 2 pattern dress, all battalions wear Blackcock tail feathers attached to the Glengarry in a tradition taken from the Royal Scots and King's Own Scottish Borderers.
- The regimental motto of the Highlanders, Cuidich 'n Righ (Aid the King), has been incorporated into the Royal Scots Thistle pattern collar dogs worn on the No.1 and No.2 pattern doublet or Service Dress jacket.
- The tartan adopted by the new regiment is Government 1A (sometimes known as Sutherland), a version of the Government (Black Watch) tartan worn by the Argyll and Sutherland Highlanders.
- The Pipes and Drums of each battalion preserve the ceremonial dress of the antecedent regiments. Thus 2 SCOTS pipers and drummers wear Government no 11 tartan, Red Erskine, 3 SCOTS drummers wear no 1, Black Watch, and pipers wear Royal Stewart, 4 SCOTS pipers and drummers wear no 4, Cameron of Erracht, and 7 SCOTS pipers wear Royal Stewart (see Government tartans).
- The kilt is sewn in a box pleat style, as worn by the 2nd Battalion Black Watch, Seaforth Highlanders, Queen's Own Highlanders (Seaforth and Camerons) and the Argyll and Sutherland Highlanders. The Sporran is in the horsehair style worn by the Seaforth Highlanders and Gordon Highlanders, with a brass Black Watch cantle.
- The Black and Red diced Hose and scarlet Garter flashes are in a style worn by the Black Watch. The Spats with black buttons, worn over the Brogues, are in a style worn by the Gordon Highlanders, with a point to the rear, as worn by the Black Watch.
- The Band of the Royal Regiment of Scotland wears the Feather bonnet with a red over white hackle and scarlet Doublet in Full Dress Uniform.

=== Hackles ===
While in PCS combat dress, each battalion wears its own unique coloured hackle on the Tam O'Shanter:

- 1st Battalion (formerly): Black
- 2nd Battalion: White
- 3rd Battalion: Red
- 4th Battalion: Blue
- 5th Battalion: Green
- 6th Battalion: Black (was Grey)
- 7th Battalion: Black (was Purple)

When 1 SCOTS became 1 RANGER in November 2021, the black hackle was adopted as the Regimental hackle and is now worn by all ranks when not serving at Regimental Duty.

== Mascot ==
The official mascot is a Shetland pony named Cruachan. He was originally the regimental mascot of the Argyll and Sutherland Highlanders prior to the amalgamation. The first pony mascot was presented to the Argylls in 1929 by Princess Louise, Duchess of Argyll and named after Ben Cruachan, a mountain in the Argylls' namesake lieutenancy, and the war cry of Clan Campbell, of whom the Duke of Argyll was chief. The current mascot is Cruachan IV who was presented in late 2012.

== Order of precedence ==
| Preceded by Welsh Guards | Infantry Order of Precedence | Succeeded by Princess of Wales's Royal Regiment |

== Alliances ==
Historic alliances are as follows:

The Royal Highland Fusiliers

- Canada: The Royal Highland Fusiliers of Canada
- New Zealand: The Royal New Zealand Infantry Regiment
- Pakistan: 11th Battalion, The Baloch Regiment
- South Africa: Chief Maqoma Regiment

The Black Watch

- Canada: The Black Watch (Royal Highland Regiment) of Canada
- Canada: 42nd Field Artillery Regiment (Lanark and Renfrew Scottish), RCA
- Canada: The Prince Edward Island Regiment (RCAC)
- Australia: The Royal Queensland Regiment
- Australia: The Royal New South Wales Regiment
- South Africa: Solomon Mahlangu Regiment
- New Zealand: New Zealand Scottish Regiment
- Royal Navy: HMS Montrose

The Highlanders

- Canada: The Cameron Highlanders of Ottawa (Duke of Edinburgh's Own)
- Canada: The 48th Highlanders of Canada
- Canada: The Queen's Own Cameron Highlanders of Canada
- Canada: The Seaforth Highlanders of Canada
- Canada: The Toronto Scottish Regiment (Queen Elizabeth The Queen Mother's Own)
- Australia: 7th Battalion, The Royal Australian Regiment
- Australia: 5th/6th Battalion, Royal Victoria Regiment (formerly 5th Battalion, The Victorian Scottish Regiment)
- Australia: The Royal South Australia Regiment
- Australia: 16th Battalion, The Royal Western Australia Regiment (formerly 16th Battalion, The Cameron Highlanders of Western Australia)
- New Zealand: The Otago and Southland Regiment
- New Zealand: The Wellington (City of Wellington's Own) and Hawke's Bay Regiment
- South Africa: Gonnema Regiment
- Royal Navy: HMS Sutherland
- Royal Navy: HMS Victorious

The Argyll and Sutherland Highlanders

- Canada: The Argyll and Sutherland Highlanders of Canada (Princess Louise's)
- Canada: The Calgary Highlanders (10th Canadians)
- Australia: The Royal Queensland Regiment
- Australia: The Royal New South Wales Regiment
- Pakistan: 1st Battalion (Scinde), The Frontier Force Regiment
- Royal Navy: HMS Argyll

== Lineage ==
| 1880 | 1881 Childers Reforms | 1921 Name changes | 1957 Defence White Paper | 1966 Defence White Paper | 1990 Options for Change | 2003 Delivering Security in a Changing World |
|---|---|---|---|---|---|---|
| 1st (The Royal Scots) Regiment of Foot | The Royal Scots (Lothian Regiment) | The Royal Scots (The Royal Regiment) | | | | The Royal Regiment of Scotland |
| 25th (King's Own Borderers) Regiment of Foot | The King's Own Borderers renamed in 1887: The King's Own Scottish Borderers | | | | | The Royal Regiment of Scotland |
| 21st (Royal Scots Fusiliers) Regiment of Foot | The Royal Scots Fusiliers | | The Royal Highland Fusiliers (Princess Margaret's Own Glasgow and Ayrshire Regiment) | | | The Royal Regiment of Scotland |
| 71st (Highland) (Light Infantry) Regiment of Foot | The Highland Light Infantry renamed in 1923: The Highland Light Infantry (City of Glasgow Regiment) | | The Royal Highland Fusiliers (Princess Margaret's Own Glasgow and Ayrshire Regiment) | | | The Royal Regiment of Scotland |
| 74th (Highlanders) Regiment of Foot | The Highland Light Infantry renamed in 1923: The Highland Light Infantry (City of Glasgow Regiment) | | The Royal Highland Fusiliers (Princess Margaret's Own Glasgow and Ayrshire Regiment) | | | The Royal Regiment of Scotland |
| 42nd (Royal Highland, The Black Watch) Regiment of Foot | The Black Watch (Royal Highlanders) | | | | | The Royal Regiment of Scotland |
| 73rd (Perthshire) Regiment of Foot | The Black Watch (Royal Highlanders) | | | | | The Royal Regiment of Scotland |
| 72nd (Duke of Albany's Own Highlanders) Regiment of Foot | Seaforth Highlanders (Ross-shire Buffs) renamed on 22 November 1881: Seaforth Highlanders (Ross–shire Buffs, The Duke of Albany's) | | The Queen's Own Highlanders (Seaforth and Camerons) | | The Highlanders (Seaforth, Gordons and Camerons) | The Royal Regiment of Scotland |
| 78th (Highlanders) (Ross-shire Buffs) Regiment of Foot | Seaforth Highlanders (Ross-shire Buffs) renamed on 22 November 1881: Seaforth Highlanders (Ross–shire Buffs, The Duke of Albany's) | | The Queen's Own Highlanders (Seaforth and Camerons) | | The Highlanders (Seaforth, Gordons and Camerons) | The Royal Regiment of Scotland |
| 79th (Queen's Own Cameron Highlanders) Regiment of Foot | The Queen's Own Cameron Highlanders | | The Queen's Own Highlanders (Seaforth and Camerons) | | The Highlanders (Seaforth, Gordons and Camerons) | The Royal Regiment of Scotland |
| 75th (Stirlingshire) Regiment of Foot | The Gordon Highlanders | | | | The Highlanders (Seaforth, Gordons and Camerons) | The Royal Regiment of Scotland |
| 92nd (Gordon Highlanders) Regiment of Foot | The Gordon Highlanders | | | | The Highlanders (Seaforth, Gordons and Camerons) | The Royal Regiment of Scotland |
| 91st (Princess Louise's Argyllshire Highlanders) Regiment of Foot | Princess Louise's (Sutherland and Argyll Highlanders) renamed on 2 June 1882: Princess Louise's (Argyll and Sutherland Highlanders) | The Argyll and Sutherland Highlanders (Princess Louise's) | | | | The Royal Regiment of Scotland |
| 93rd (Sutherland Highlanders) Regiment of Foot | Princess Louise's (Sutherland and Argyll Highlanders) renamed on 2 June 1882: Princess Louise's (Argyll and Sutherland Highlanders) | The Argyll and Sutherland Highlanders (Princess Louise's) | | | | The Royal Regiment of Scotland |

== See also ==
- Armed forces in Scotland
- Military history of Scotland
- Units of the British Army and the 2004 restructuring
- Scots Guards
- Royal Scots Dragoon Guards
