= Forthside Barracks =

- Stirling
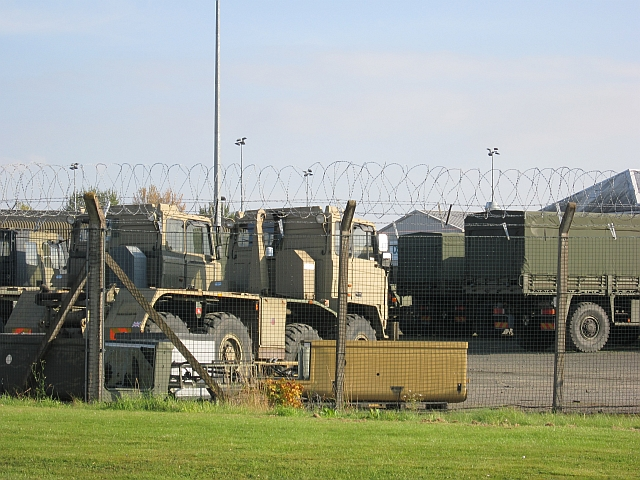
- Forthside Barracks

Site information
- Type: Barracks
- Owner: Ministry of Defence
- Operator: British Army

Location
- Location within Stirlingshire
- Coordinates: 56°7′1″N 03°55′36″W

Site history
- Built: 1899
- Built for: War Office
- In use: 1899-Present

Forthside Barracks is a former military installation in Stirling, Scotland.

== History ==
Forthside Barracks were built as an ordnance depot in 1899. It became the depot of the Argyll and Sutherland Highlanders before they vacated the place in 1999.

In November 2016 the Ministry of Defence announced that the facility, as well as the adjacent Meadowforth Barracks, would close in 2022, later extended to 2024.

51st Infantry Brigade and Army Headquarters Scotland relocated from Forthside to Redford Cavalry Barracks in Edinburgh on 26 March 2021.

== Based units ==
Units based at Forthside Barracks include:

British Army

- 154 Medical Squadron, 225 (Scottish) Medical Regiment
- Detachment, D Company, 51st Highland, 7th Battalion, Royal Regiment of Scotland
- Stirling Detachment, Tayforth University Officers' Training Corps
- 51st Infantry Brigade Cadet Training Team

Community Cadet Forces

- Headquarters, A (Stirling) Company, Argyll and Sutherland Highlanders Battalion, Army Cadet Force
  - Stirling Detachment
- 1019 (City of Stirling) Squadron, Air Training Corps
