= Maresfield Camp =

British Army camp

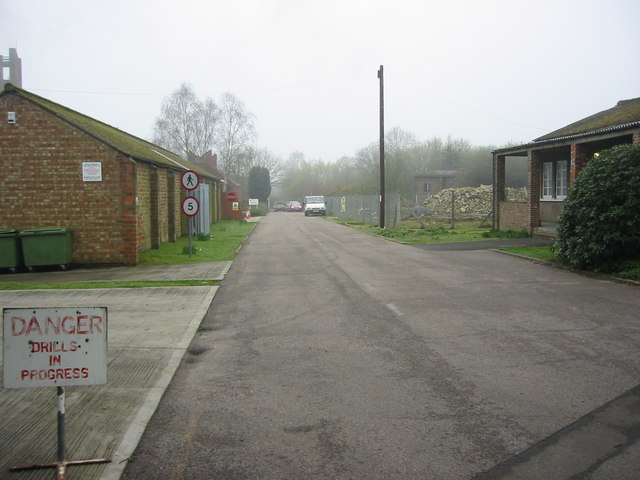
- The camp in March 2005

Site information
- Type: Barracks
- Owner: Ministry of Defence
- Operator: British Army

Location
- Location within East Sussex
- Coordinates: 50.9940°N 0.0766°E

Site history
- Built: 1914
- Built for: War Office
- In use: 1914 to c.1970

Garrison information
- Occupants: Depot of the Intelligence Corps

Maresfield Camp was a camp of the British Army at Maresfield in East Sussex. It served as the depot of the Intelligence Corps.

== History ==
The camp was established when the southwest part of the Maresfield Park Estate was requestioned by the War Office from Count Alexander Münster in 1914. During the First World War, it served as a training camp for Kitchener's Army and as a riding school for yeomanry units, where they were prepared for deployment to the Western Front.

In 1920, it became the School of Signals and Signal Training Centre and continued to serve in that role until the school moved to Catterick Garrison, in North Yorkshire in 1925. The Royal Signals continued to use the camp and the Band of the Royal Corps of Signals was formed there in August 1938.

A large number of units were accommodated at the camp in anticipation of the Normandy landings during the Second World War and King George VI inspected the troops at the camp shortly before they departed for their ports of embarkation on the south coast. In 1948, the army camp became the depot of the Intelligence Corps. The playwright, Alan Bennett, was one of those who spent part of their National Service at the camp in the 1950s. The camp continued to serve as the corps depot until the Intelligence Corps moved to Templer Barracks in Ashford, Kent in 1966.

In February 1967, the Queen's Own Hussars arrived at the camp from where squadrons were deployed to Aden in July 1967, to Sharjah in July 1967, to Singapore in October 1968 and to Cyprus in June 1969. After the camp was decommissioned, the site was redeveloped and was made available for use as the training centre for East Sussex Fire and Rescue Service and for use by small and medium sized businesses as Ashdown Business Park.
