= Band of the Royal Corps of Signals =

The Band of the Royal Corps of Signals is the band of the Royal Corps of Signals under the Royal Corps of Army Music. It was formed on 29 August 1938 at Maresfield Camp, East Sussex and can be traced back to the Royal Engineers Signal Service.

== History ==
On 29 August 1938, the Band of the Royal Corps of Signals was formed from the 1st Division Telegraph Battalion, Royal Engineers. The Band's uniform is based on the Royal Engineers Band Uniform. The band moved to Catterick Garrison and then to Blandford Forum in Dorset, where it remained until 2014.

The Band of the Royal Corps of Signals has also appeared on the BBC's Songs of Praise.

== See also ==
- British Armed Forces
- Military band
