= Band of the Royal Regiment of Scotland =

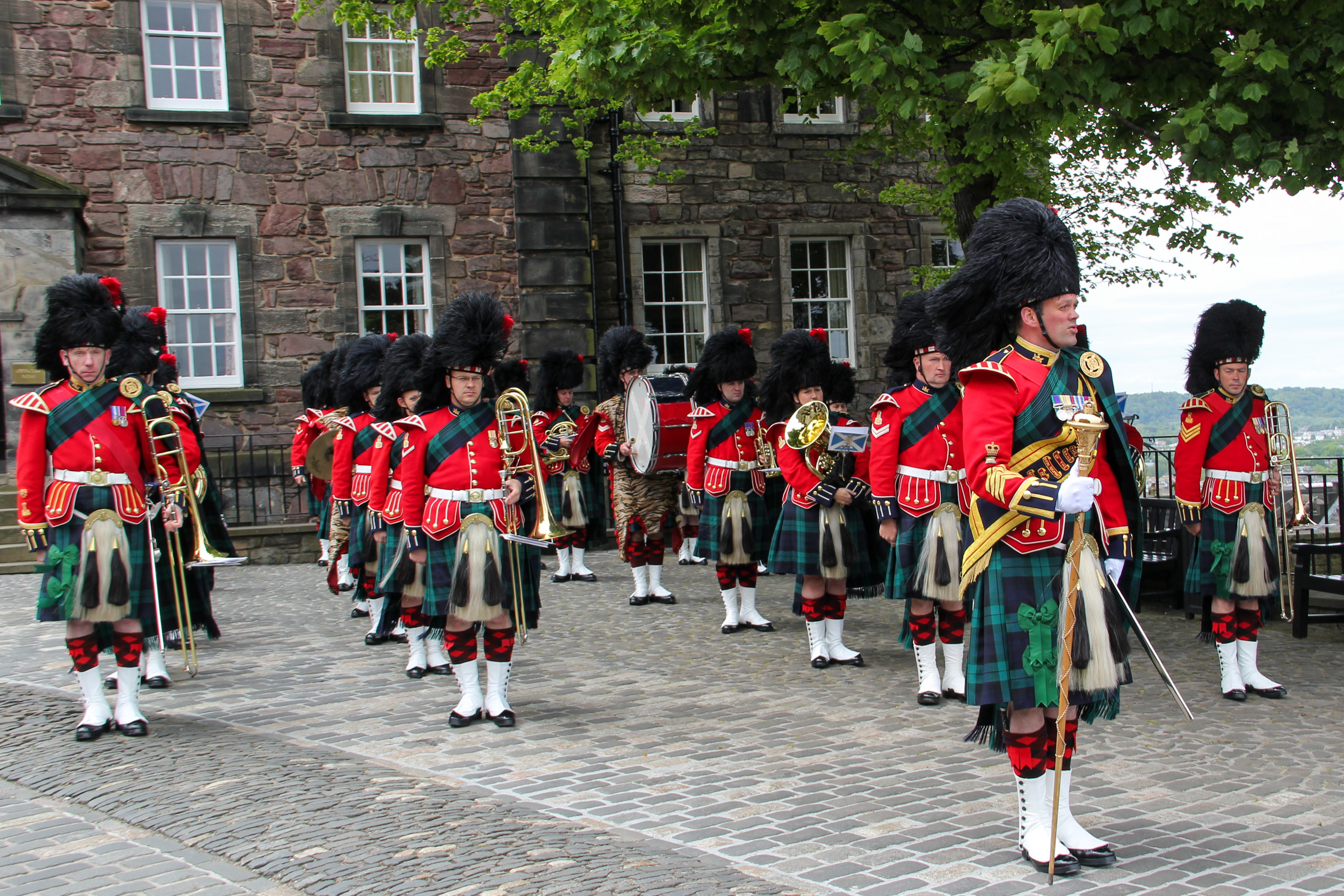
- The Band of the Royal Regiment of Scotland at Edinburgh Castle.
- Active: 2006 to Present
- Country: United Kingdom
- Branch: British Army
- Type: military band
- Role: public duties
- Size: 35 musicians
- Part of: Royal Regiment of Scotland
- Headquarters: Dreghorn Barracks, Edinburgh, Scotland
- Nickname: SCOTS Band
- Mottos: "Nemo Me Impune Lacessit" (Latin) "No One Provokes Me With Impunity"
- March: Quick: Scotland the Brave; Slow: Royal Regiment of Scotland Slow March
- Anniversaries: 28 March

The Band of the Royal Regiment of Scotland is one of the three official military bands of the Royal Regiment of Scotland, and is based at Dreghorn Barracks, Edinburgh. The bandsmen wear the feather bonnet with a red over white hackle and scarlet doublet in full dress uniform. In addition, there are two Territorial bands, the Highland Band and the Lowland Band, which are administered by the regiment's territorial battalions. It is also one of two line infantry bands in the Royal Corps of Army Music.

== Ensembles ==
- Concert band
- Marching band
- Dance band
- Pipes and Drums
- Fanfare Trumpeters
- Jazz Ensemble

== Other musical activities ==
The SCOTS Band performs for events sponsored by the military. Besides military events, it also takes in many charity events in Scotland. Their schedule includes but is not limited to:

- Poppy Scotland
- Remembrance Day
- Beating the Retreat
- Musically supporting schools in both Scotland and the North of England

== Gallery ==
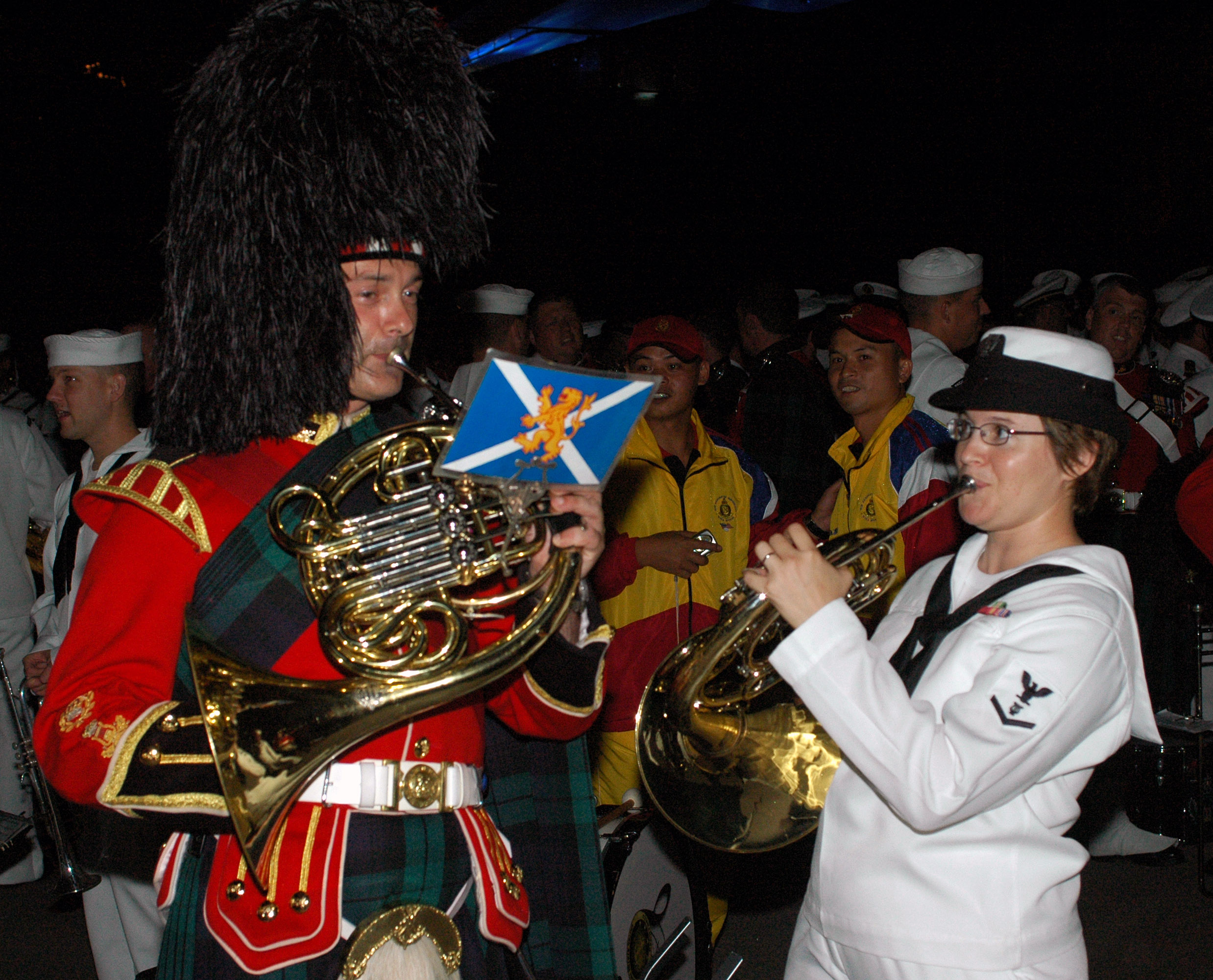
Musician from the Band of the Royal Regiment of Scotland in Full Dress uniform in Kuala Lumpur.

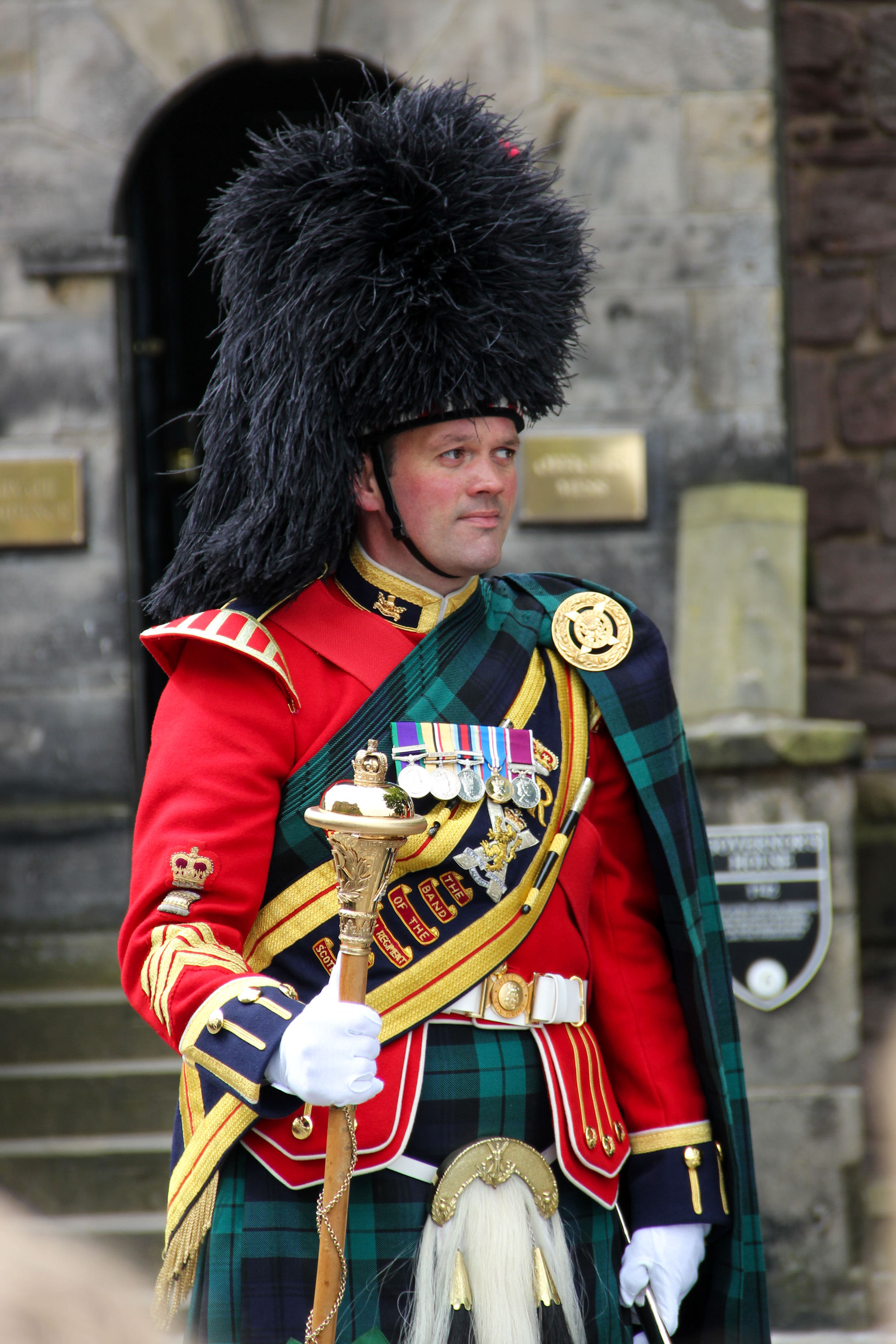
Drum Major from the Band of the Royal Regiment of Scotland inside Edinburgh Castle

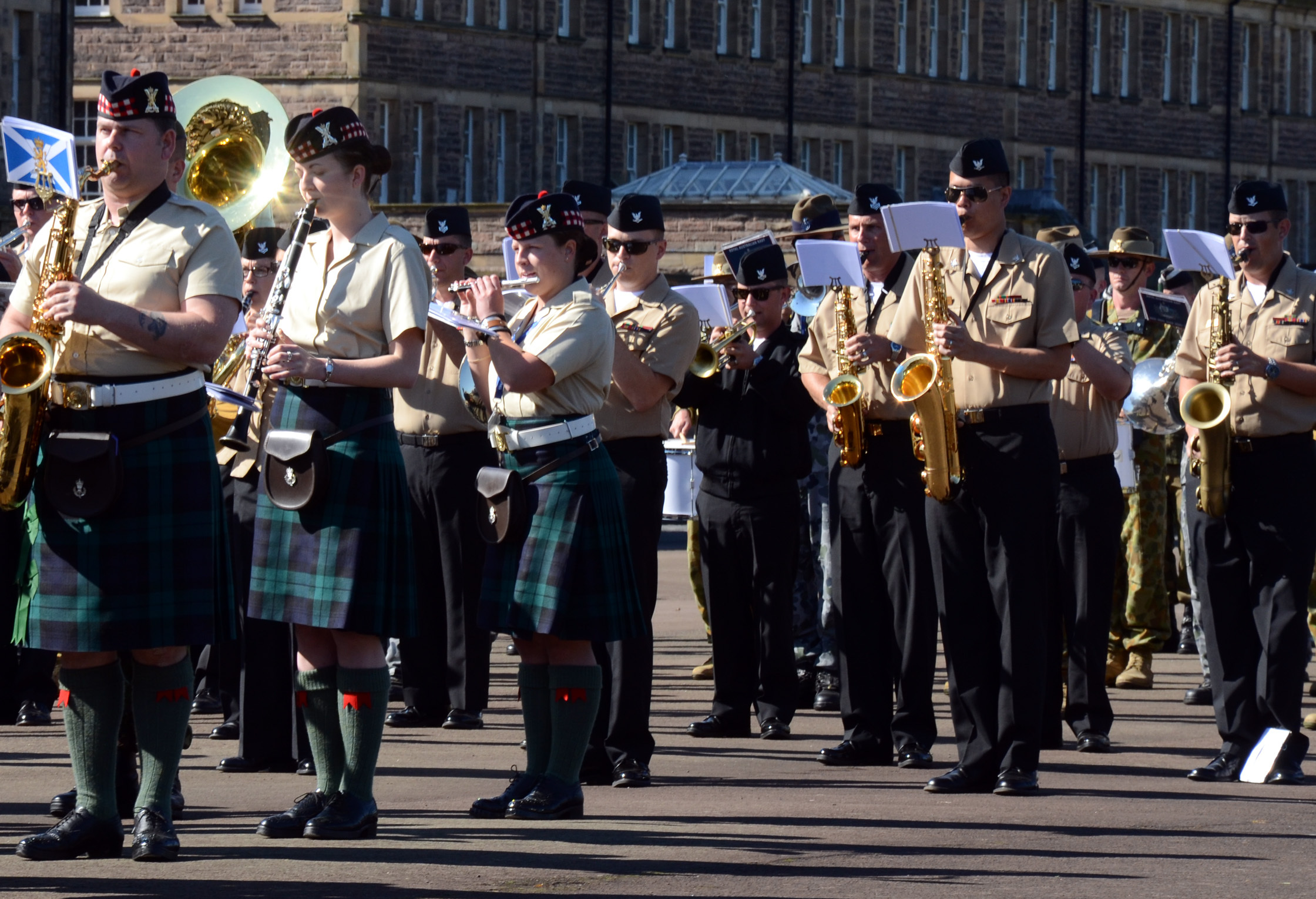

== See also ==
- Royal Corps of Army Music
