= Lowland Band of the Royal Regiment of Scotland =

The Lowland Band of the Royal Regiment of Scotland is a military band in the Territorial Army and one of three military bands in the Royal Regiment of Scotland. The band is based at the East Claremont Street drill hall in Edinburgh and is administered by 52nd Lowland, 6th Battalion, The Royal Regiment of Scotland (6 SCOTS). The other two bands in the Regiment are the regular Regimental Band of the Royal Regiment of Scotland, which is based at Dreghorn Barracks in Edinburgh and is administered by the Royal Corps of Army Music, and the other is the territorial Highland Band of the Royal Regiment of Scotland, which is based at Queen's Barracks in Perth and administered by 51st Highland, 7th Battalion, The Royal Regiment of Scotland (7 SCOTS).

== History ==
The band was originally formed in 1958 for service with the Territorial 7th/9th (Highlanders) Battalion of The Royal Scots (The Royal Regiment), based at the East Claremont Street drill hall in Edinburgh, and they wore a Hunting Stewart kilt, the uniform of the old 'Dandy 9th' (Highlanders) Battalion of the Royal Scots who, as Highlanders living in Edinburgh, refused to wear the Royal Scots' Lowland tartan trews.

In 1961, the 7th/9th (Highlanders) Battalion was amalgamated with the 8th (Peebleshire) Battalion of The Royal Scots to become the 8th/9th Battalion and when the Territorial Army was reorganised into the Territorial Army Volunteer Reserve (TAVR) in 1967, the 8th/9th Battalion Royal Scots became part of the Royal Scots and Cameronians Territorials.

This unit was itself disbanded in 1969 and its soldiers were transferred to the 52nd Lowland Volunteers, which had also been raised in 1967. The band, supplemented by bandsmen from 278 Field Regiment Royal Artillery, was however put under the command of the City of Edinburgh University Officer Training Corps and then became known as The Royal Scots (Territorial) Band East Lowlands.

The band eventually followed the other elements of the old Royal Scots and Cameronians Territorials, also coming under the command of the 52nd Lowland Volunteers in 1970, retaining its name as the Royal Scots Territorial Band. When the 1st and 2nd Battalions of the 52nd Lowland Volunteers were renamed as a result of the Front Line First reforms of the British Army in 1994, the band stayed with the redesignated 1st Battalion, which became The Lowland Volunteers in 1995 and subsequently the 52nd Lowland Regiment in 1999.

As a result of the Strategic Defence Review of 1998, the band was renamed as The Band of 52nd Lowland Brigade on 1 July 1999 and although it was administered by the new 52nd Lowland Regiment, it had actually become a Brigade level asset. It did however retain the uniform and cap badge of the Royal Scots.

After the formation of The Royal Regiment of Scotland on 28 March 2006, 52nd Lowland Regiment became the new Regiment's 6th Battalion and the band took the title The Lowland Band of The Royal Regiment of Scotland. Along with the Highland Band and six current Pipes and Drums in the new Regiment, the Lowland Band continues to wear its antecedent uniform, the No. 1 pattern ceremonial dress of the Royal Scots, but now with the cap badge of the Royal Regiment of Scotland on the Glengarry.

The original regular Lowland Band of the Scottish Division was formed under the command of the Corps of Army Music in 1994, and consisted of the amalgamated regular regimental bands of the three Lowland Scottish infantry regiments at the time, the Royal Scots, the King's Own Scottish Borderers and the Royal Highland Fusiliers. The band was itself amalgamated with the Highland Band of the Scottish Division in 2006, forming the regular Regimental Band of the Royal Regiment of Scotland.

== Current activities ==
The Lowland Band of the Royal Regiment of Scotland takes part in military and civilian events all over the UK and the world on behalf of 6 SCOTS and the Royal Regiment of Scotland, including the Battalion's annual Beating Retreat and Remembrance Day ceremonies in George Square, the Edinburgh Military Tattoo and the Opening of the Scottish Parliament. The current Director of Music is Captain Phillip Wood, a former Bandmaster of the regular Band of the Royal Regiment of Scotland and Bandmaster of the Light Cavalry Band.
