= Redford Barracks =

Barracks in Edinburgh, Scotland

- Part of Edinburgh Garrison
- Colinton, Edinburgh in Scotland
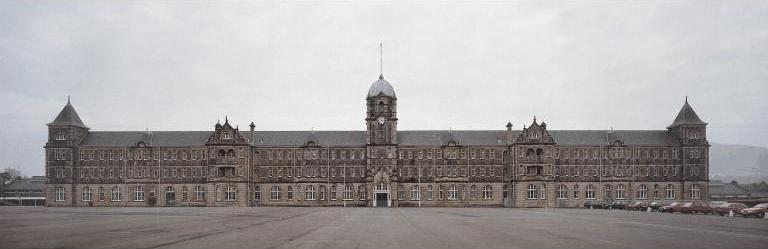
- The former Cavalry Barracks at Redford

Site information
- Type: Army barracks
- Owner: Ministry of Defence
- Operator: British Army
- Condition: Operational

Location
- Location within Edinburgh
- Coordinates: 55°54′37″N 3°14′45″W
- Area: 31 hectares (77 acres)

Site history
- Built: 1909–1915
- Built for: War Office
- Architect: Harry Bell Measures
- In use: 1915 – present

Garrison information
- Garrison: Balaclava Company, 5th Battalion The Royal Regiment of Scotland (Argyll and Sutherland Highlanders)

Redford Cavalry and Infantry Barracks is a military installation located on Colinton Road, near the Edinburgh City Bypass, east of the suburb of Colinton in Edinburgh, Scotland.

== History ==
Redford Barracks was built between 1909 and 1915 by the War Office and designed by Harry Bell Measures. When completed, the barracks was the largest military installation built in Scotland since Fort George in the Highlands. The British Army garrison in Edinburgh Castle formally moved out to the barracks in 1923. Today, the Infantry Barracks are unoccupied, and the Cavalry Barracks houses Balaclava Company, 5th Battalion The Royal Regiment of Scotland (Argyll and Sutherland Highlanders).

The barracks comprises two category B listed main buildings and parade squares facing Colinton Road.

=== Infantry Barracks ===
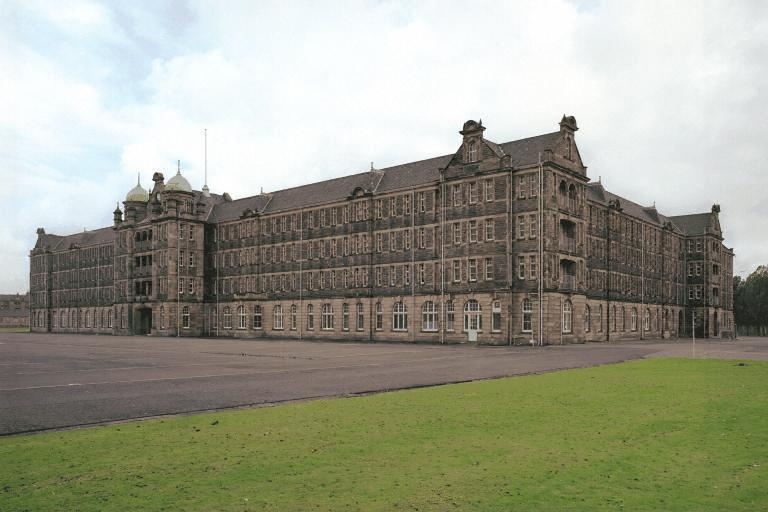
The Infantry Barracks at Redford

The Infantry Barracks (55.9103°N 3.2457°W), was originally built to house an entire infantry regiment and could accommodate 1,000 men. It could provide everything the resident line infantry battalion required to function. The families lived in service quarters close to the barracks and the children attended local schools. The main barrack block itself housed the resident battalion headquarters, one Rifle Company, a Fire Support Company and Headquarters Company. The two other Rifle Companies were accommodated in a separate, newer block. 3rd Battalion The Rifles, the last battalion to occupy the barracks, moved out in 2014.

=== Cavalry Barracks ===
The three-storey Cavalry Barracks (55.9127°N 3.2419°W), with its tall domed clock-tower, was originally built to house a cavalry regiment, most notably the Royal Scots Greys, with a large annexe of stables and associated outbuildings. With the permanent stationing of armoured units such as the Royal Scots Dragoon Guards in Germany as part of the British Army of the Rhine, the Cavalry Barracks became a home to D Squadron, Royal Scots Dragoon Guards stationed there from 1971 until disbanded in 1976.

The cavalry barracks have been the home for Balaclava Company, 5th Battalion The Royal Regiment of Scotland (Argyll and Sutherland Highlanders) since 2014. The Regimental Headquarters of the Scottish and North Irish Yeomanry has also been located at the cavalry barracks since 2014.

Redford Barracks had 370 UK Armed Forces Service personnel based there at 1 January 2024.

== Based units ==
The following notable units are based at Redford Barracks.

British Army

- Headquarters, 51st Infantry Brigade and Headquarters Scotland
- Balaklava Company, 5th Battalion, Royal Regiment of Scotland
- Army School of Bagpipe Music and Highland Drumming
- Headquarters, 5 Military Intelligence Battalion, Intelligence Corps
- Regimental Headquarters, 105th Regiment, Royal Artillery
  - I Troop, 278 (Lowland) Battery
- Regimental Headquarters, Scottish and North Irish Yeomanry
  - E (Lothians and Border Yeomanry) Squadron
- City of Edinburgh University Officers' Training Corps

Community Cadet Forces

- 20 (Colinton) Platoon, Lothians and Borders Battalion, Army Cadet Force
- Pipes and Drums of Lothians and Borders Battalion, Army Cadet Force
- 870 (Dreghorn) Squadron, Air Training Corps

== Future ==
As part of the Future Force 2020 budgetary announcement in July 2011, RAF Kirknewton was to have been developed into a major Army base to host a Multi-Role Brigade; Redford and Dreghorn Barracks would become surplus to requirements and were earmarked for disposal under this plan. However, in December 2011, it was reported that the planned move to Kirknewton was in doubt, and that Redford Barracks would be retained. By 2013, it was confirmed that the MRB plan had been dropped, and that Redford Barracks would be closed. In 2019, it was announced that the closure of the barracks had been deferred to 2025. This was once more extended to 2030.

In 2021, the City of Edinburgh Council revealed plans to create 800 new homes on the site, as part of their City Plan 2030.

== See also ==
- Armed forces in Scotland
- List of British Army installations
- Military history of Scotland
