= Band of the Parachute Regiment =

English regimental band

The Band of the Parachute Regiment was the regimental band of the Parachute Regiment under the Royal Corps of Army Music.

The Parachute Regiment was formed on 1 August 1942. It did not receive any musical support until 1947 when the band of the 1st and 2nd Battalion was formed in Aldershot, Hampshire. A year later, the Band of the 3rd Battalion was formed.

In the 1985 Defence Review, the three battalion bands were disbanded and reformed to make up two new larger regimental bands, the Falklands and Pegasus Bands. These bands provided music to the three battalions of the Parachute Regiment and additional airborne units. In 1994, 'Options for Change' resulted in the creation of the Corps of Army Music and subsequently the amalgamation of the Falklands and Pegasus Band to create the Band of the Parachute Regiment under the command of the Director of Music.

In 2019, the Band of the Parachute Regiment was amalgamated with the Band of the Queen's Division and Band of the Army Air Corps into British Army Bands Colchester.

== See also ==
- British Army
- Military Band
