= Royal Corps of Army Music =

Music arm of the British Army

The Royal Corps of Army Music
- Cap badge of The Royal Corps of Army Music
- Active: 1994–Present
- Country: United Kingdom
- Branch: British Army
- Headquarters: Gibraltar Barracks, Minley
- Motto: Unity Through Excellence
- March: The Music Makers (quick); Esprit De Corps (slow)

Commanders
- Colonel in Chief: Sophie, Duchess of Edinburgh
- Colonel Commandant: Brigadier Jason Ainley
- Honorary Deputy Colonel Commandant: Robert Rinder

The Royal Corps of Army Music (RCAM, widely known by its former acronym CAMUS) is a Corps of the British Army dedicated to the provision and promotion of military music.

== History ==
=== Formation ===
The formation of the Corps of Army Music was triggered by a defence review known as Options for Change in 1991 and followed a 1993 announcement by the Chief of the General Staff that the number of regular army bands was to be reduced from 69 to 30. The period saw the number of personnel fall from 2,000 to 1,100, with Lieutenant Colonel Roger Tomlinson of the Royal Military School of Music describing it as "a gloomy time for those of us in the military music business". Queen Elizabeth II signed a warrant on 13 August 1994 to allow the formation of the Corps of Army Music. All regular army officers who were Directors of Music in the various corps and regiments and all regular army musicians would transfer to the Corps of Army Music - now the newest and most junior corps in the army - on 1 September 1994.

The home of the corps was established at Kneller Hall in Twickenham, a site that already encompassed the Royal Military School of Music. The school was founded by Prince George, Duke of Cambridge, soon after his appointment as Commander in Chief in 1857, when the first class of military musicians was formed, a 'Class of Music'. The establishment was retitled as The Royal Military School of Music by Queen Victoria in 1887.

The Future Army Structure review of 2004 saw the bands of the Regular Army reduced from 30 to 23. In 2019 the number of Regular Army bands was further reduced to 14.

=== 2019 restructuring ===
In 2019, the Corps of Army Music was restructured with a number of bands being co-located and re-named. In a process of 'Military Music Optimization', the regular Army band laydown was adjusted to enable several smaller bands to train and perform as larger bands for more significant Army events: 'Co-locating 11 of the smaller bands in three major garrisons and Sandhurst has increased the flexibility of CAMUS to perform at a huge breadth of events without compromising any of the traditional bands that have been performing for many years'.

=== Renaming and move ===
During a visit to Kneller Hall in December 2020, the Earl and Countess of Wessex announced the Corps of Army Music would be renamed the Royal Corps of Army Music from January 2021. This change was formally marked with a new title presentation in January 2021 with the Countess in attendance.

In September 2021, the Corps Headquarters moved to Gibraltar Barracks in Minley, whilst the Royal Military School of Music moved to HMS Nelson alongside the Royal Marines School of Music.

== Bands of the Corps ==
The 14 constituent bands of the Corps are as follows:

- Band of the Household Cavalry, at Combermere Barracks, Windsor
- Band of the Grenadier Guards, at Wellington Barracks, Westminster, London
- Band of the Coldstream Guards, at Wellington Barracks, Westminster, London
- Band of the Scots Guards, at Wellington Barracks, Westminster, London
- Band of the Irish Guards, at Wellington Barracks, Westminster, London
- Band of the Welsh Guards, at Wellington Barracks, Westminster, London
- Band of the Royal Regiment of Scotland, at Dreghorn Barracks, Edinburgh
- Band and Bugles of The Rifles, at Worthy Down Barracks, Winchester
- Countess of Wessex's String Orchestra, at Royal Artillery Barracks, Woolwich Station, London
- British Army Band Catterick, at Piave Lines, Catterick Garrison
  - Band of the Royal Armoured Corps
  - Band of the King's Division
  - Band of the Royal Electrical and Mechanical Engineers
- British Army Band Tidworth, at Lucknow Barracks, Tidworth Camp
  - Royal Artillery Band
  - Band of the Royal Engineers
  - Band of the Adjutant General's Corps
- British Army Band Sandhurst, at the Royal Military Academy Sandhurst, Camberley
  - Band of the Royal Corps of Signals
  - Band of the Royal Logistic Corps
- British Army Band Colchester, at Merville Barracks, Colchester Garrison
  - Band of the Queen's Division (originally disbanded in 2018)
  - Band of the Parachute Regiment
  - Band of the Army Air Corps
- Band of the Prince of Wales, at Brecon

In addition to providing personnel for all the above bands, the Corps of Army Music provides 'technical support' for the Band of the Brigade of Gurkhas, based at Shorncliffe Camp, Folkestone, which is separately constituted. Other bands may be formed from time to time by drawing together personnel from different ensembles; for example the British Army Brass Band (founded by two Army Bandmasters in 2007) is 'made up of players across all bands of the Army, Regulars and Reservists'.

== Army Reserve bands ==
Army Reserve bands are not part of RCAM, reporting to their respective regimental/battalion headquarters. They provide around 30% of all the Army's musical output. The current Army Reserve bands, as of April 2021, are as follows:

- Band of the Honourable Artillery Company
- The Band of The Royal Yeomanry (Inns of Court & City Yeomanry)
- Lancashire Artillery Volunteers Band
- The Nottinghamshire Band of the Royal Engineers
- The (Northern) Band of the Royal Corps of Signals
- Lowland Band of the Royal Regiment of Scotland
- Highland Band of the Royal Regiment of Scotland
- Band of the Princess of Wales's Royal Regiment (Queen's and Royal Hampshires)
- Band of the Royal Regiment of Fusiliers
- Band of the Royal Anglian Regiment
- Volunteer Band of the Royal Gibraltar Regiment
- Band of The Royal Irish Regiment (27th (Inniskilling) 83rd and 87th and Ulster Defence Regiment)
- Band of the Royal Welsh
- Band of the Duke of Lancaster's Regiment (King's Lancashire and Border)
- Band of the Yorkshire Regiment (14th/15th, 19th & 33rd/76th Foot)
- The Band of The Mercian Regiment
- The Salamanca Band of The Rifles
- The Waterloo Band of The Rifles
- Band of 150th (Yorkshire) Regiment, Royal Logistic Corps
- Band of the Royal Army Medical Service

=== Army Volunteer bands ===
All Army Volunteer Bands serve in a voluntary capacity and have no army reserves commitment but still perform for various mess functions, church parades and civic functions, supporting their regiment and the wider regimental family. The uniform worn is that of the regular regiment which is headquartered in the Tower of London.

- The Band and Drum Corps of the Royal Regiment of Fusiliers (Lancashire)
- The Band of the Royal Regiment of Fusiliers (Warwickshire)

== List of Colonel Commandants ==
The appointment of a Colonel Commandant Corps (later Royal Corps) of Army Music dates from June 1999.

- Major General A.M.D. Palmer, CBE – June 1999-October 2005
- Major General T. N. Tyler – October 2005-October 2009
- Major General D. J. Rutherford-Jones – October 2009-January 2013
- Major General T. P. Evans, CBE, DSO – January 2013-July 2016
- Major General P. A. E. Nanson, CBE – July 2016-September 2021
- Major General David Eastman, MBE – September 2021-March 2026
- Brigadier Jason Ainley, OBE 31 March 2026 – present

== Order of precedence ==
Preceded by General Service Corps	Order of Precedence	Succeeded by Royal Monmouthshire Royal Engineers
