= Queen's Barracks =

Barracks in Perth and Kinross, Scotland

- Perth, Scotland
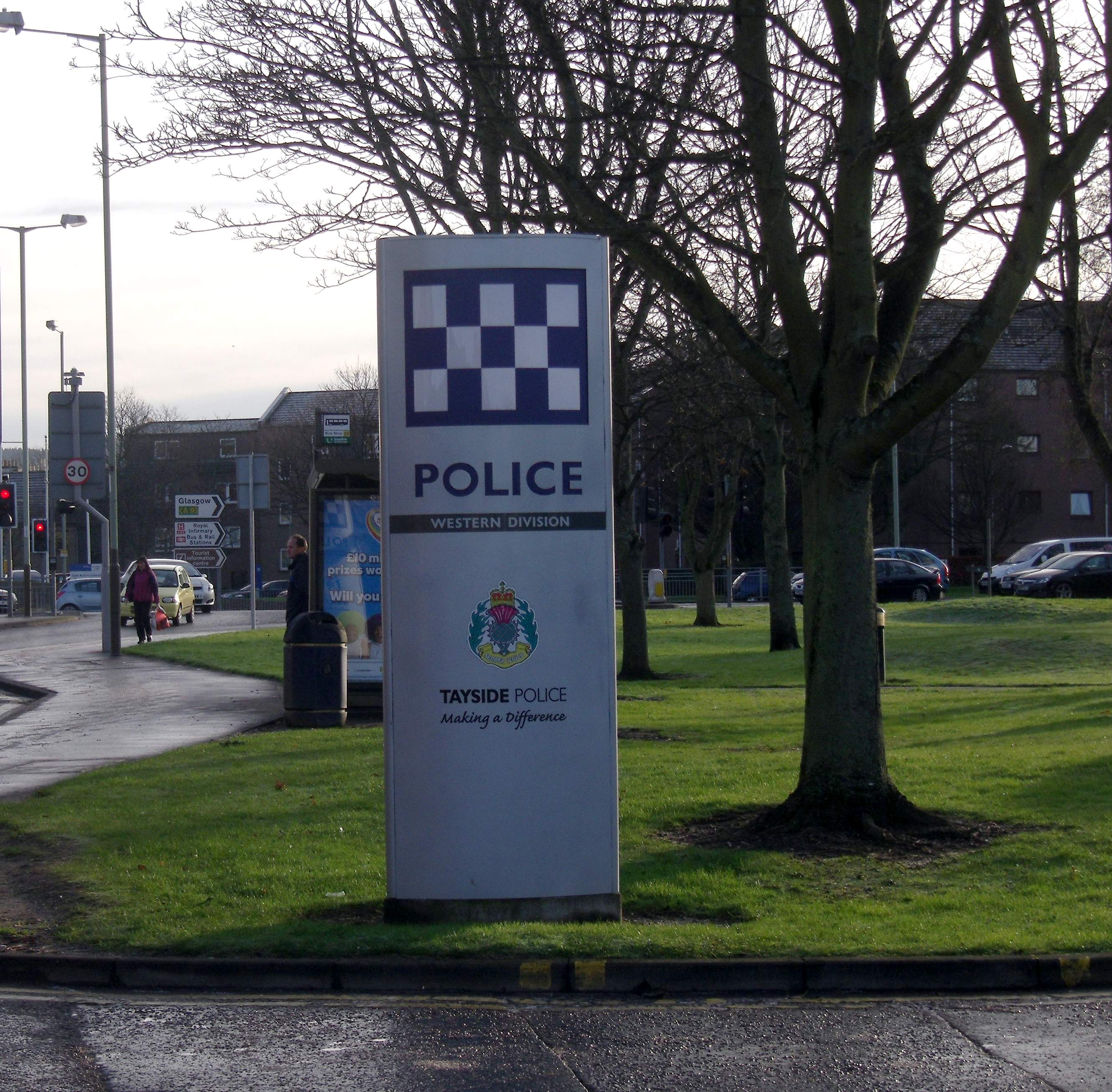
- The site, now occupied by the Tayside Police Divisional Headquarters

Site information
- Type: Barracks
- Owner: Ministry of Defence
- Operator: British Army

Location
- Location within Perth and Kinross
- Coordinates: 56.39950°N 3.43740°W

Site history
- Built: 1793
- Built for: War Office
- In use: 1793-1961

Garrison information
- Occupants: Black Watch

Queen's Barracks was a military installation in Perth, Scotland.

== History ==
The barracks were established in the north west of the city as a home for cavalry regiments in 1793. It became the home to the 2nd Dragoon Guards (Queen's Bays) and it was from this regiment that the barracks derived its name. The barracks were subsequently converted to take infantry regiments.

In 1873 a system of recruiting areas based on counties was instituted under the Cardwell Reforms and the barracks became the depot for the 42nd (Royal Highland) Regiment of Foot and the 79th (Cameron Highlanders) Regiment of Foot. Following the Childers Reforms, the 42nd (Royal Highland) Regiment of Foot amalgamated with the 73rd (Perthshire) Regiment of Foot to form the Black Watch with its depot in the barracks in 1881.

In the 1960s the Regimental Headquarters and the Regimental Museum moved to Balhousie Castle where the Museum still remains.

The barracks were decommissioned in May 1961 and were then demolished. The site became the headquarters of Perth and Kinross Constabulary and then Western Division, Tayside Police.

In June 2017 the Black Watch Association unveiled a memorial in the form of a simple stone structure on the site of the former barracks.

Today, the site is Police Scotland's Perth headquarters.

=== Army Reserve Centre ===
The Army Reserve Centre, located further up the Dunkeld Road, has since adopted the name of Queen's Barracks. It is home to the Battalion Headquarters and Headquarters Company of 7th Battalion, The Royal Regiment of Scotland. The Highland Band, and Pipes & Drums, 7 SCOTS is also based here.
