= Dreghorn Barracks =

Barracks in Edinburgh, Scotland

- Part of Edinburgh Garrison
- Dreghorn, Edinburgh in Scotland
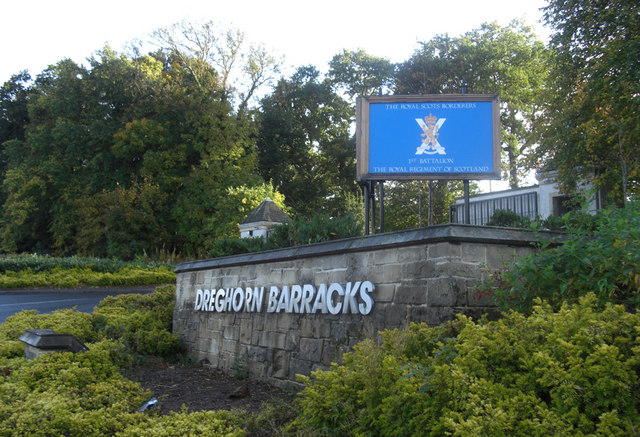
- Entrance to Dreghorn Barracks in 2008

Site information
- Type: Army barracks
- Owner: Ministry of Defence
- Operator: British Army
- Condition: Operational

Location
- Location within Edinburgh
- Coordinates: 55.9022°N 3.2395°W
- Area: 61 hectares (150 acres)

Site history
- Built: 1937–1939
- Architect: William Alexander Ross
- In use: 1939 – present

Garrison information
- Garrison: 3rd Battalion, The Rifles

Dreghorn Barracks are located in Edinburgh, Scotland. The barracks are situated at the southern edge of the city, south of Colinton, and adjacent to the Edinburgh City Bypass.

== History ==
The site was previously occupied by Dreghorn Castle, a 17th-century mansion built by Sir William Murray, Master of Work to the Crown of Scotland. The castle was extended around 1805 by Archibald and James Elliot. In the 19th century it was the home of Robert Andrew Macfie. The castle was acquired by the War Office in 1893, and was eventually demolished in 1955.

A monument outside the barracks on Redford Road commemorates the insurgent covenanters of the Pentland Rising who were defeated at the Battle of Rullion Green in 1666. The monument was erected in 1884 by R A Macfie of Dreghorn House, and incorporates columns taken from the 18th-century Edinburgh Royal Infirmary, designed by William Adam and demolished the previous year.

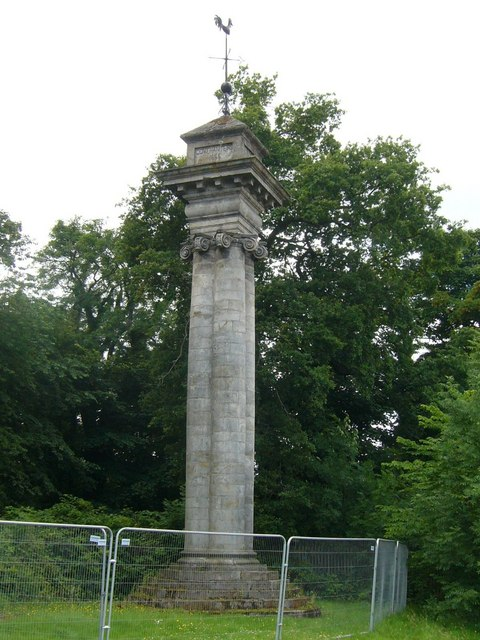
Covenanters' Monument beside Dreghorn Barracks to those who perished in and after the Pentland Rising

The present barracks complex was largely built between 1937 and 1939 to designs by William Alexander Ross. The barracks were upgraded between 1989 and 1992, with the addition of several new buildings. The four original buildings are protected as a category C(s) listed building.

As part of the Future Force 2020 budgetary announcement in July 2011, RAF Kirknewton was to have been developed into a major Army base to host a Multi-Role Brigade and Dreghorn Barracks was earmarked for disposal. However plans to develop Kirknewton as an Army barracks were scrapped in March 2013 and Dreghorn Barracks was retained.

Dreghorn Barracks had 670 UK Armed Forces Service personnel based there at 1 January 2024.

== Current units ==
Current units stationed at the barracks include:

- 3rd Battalion, The Rifles.
- Band of the Royal Regiment of Scotland
- Edinburgh Troop, 521 EOD Squadron, 11 Explosive Ordnance Disposal and Search Regiment, Royal Logistic Corps

== See also ==
- Armed forces in Scotland
- List of British Army installations
- Military history of Scotland
- Redford Barracks – located close to Dreghorn Barracks, in Colinton
