= University Royal Naval Unit East Scotland =

Royal Navy training establishment in Edinburgh

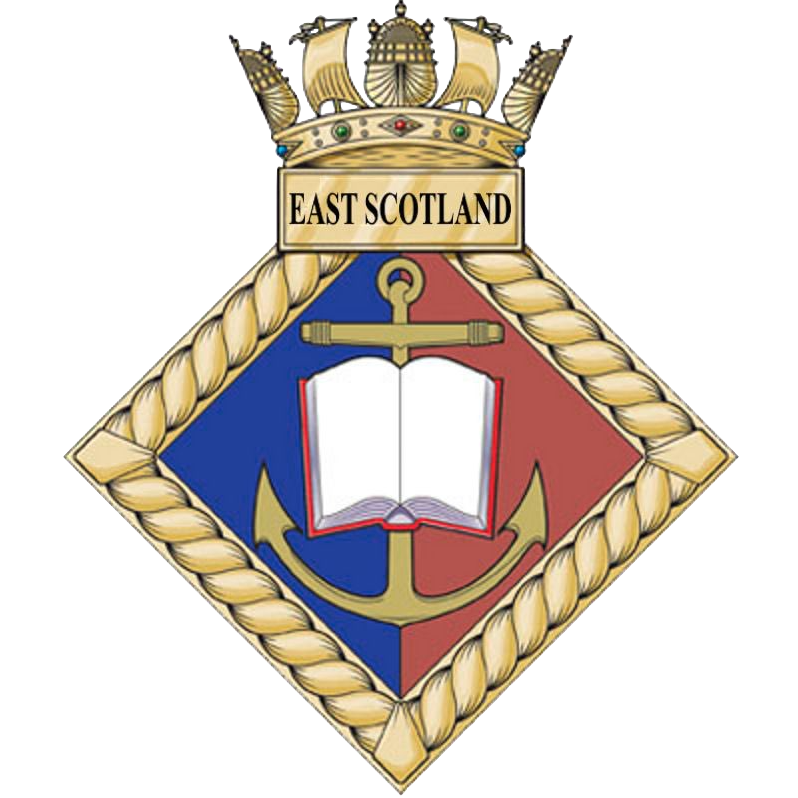
- Crest Of URNU East Scotland
- Active: 1967–present (59 years): 1967–2012 : Aberdeen; 2012–2022 : Edinburgh; 2022–present : East Scotland
- Country: United Kingdom
- Branch: Royal Navy
- Type: Training establishment
- Role: Officer Training
- Size: ~ 65 Officer Cadets; ~ 8 Training Staff; 3 Permanent Staff
- Part of: Britannia Royal Naval College; University Service Units
- Garrison/HQ: Hepburn House, Edinburgh; RMR Strathmore Avenue, Dundee
- Nicknames: URNUES; URNU East Scotland 'East Scotland' 'Scotland' (Note: The nickname 'Scotland' is usually only used when no other Scottish units (URNU Glasgow) are present.) 'Edinburgh' (Note: Even though the unit is no longer named URNU Edinburgh, the nickname lives on, due the location of the unit's HQ and due to the fact that its largest contingent of Officer Cadets are based in Edinburgh.)
- Mottos: "The Original and Best"
- Colours: Navy Blue; Gold
- March: Official – Heart of Oak; Unofficial – Scotland the Brave
- Mascot: The Unicorn
- Equipment: HMS Archer
- Website: royalnavy.mod.uk

Commanders
- Current commander: Lt Megan Burgoyne (2024-)
- Notable commanders: Lt Tim Fraser RN (1989-1991); Lt John Clink RN (1991-1993); Lt Cdr Richard Bridges RN (1974-1975)

The University Royal Naval Unit East Scotland (URNU East Scotland or URNUES) (RP: /ˈər.nuː ... / UHR-noo ..., SSE: /ˈɜːr.nuː ... / ERR-noo ...) is one of 17 University Royal Naval Units and a Royal Navy training establishment based in Scotland, accepting roughly 65 Officer Cadets from universities in Edinburgh, Fife and the Tayside region. It is one of the University Service Units and is under the command of Britannia Royal Naval College, Dartmouth. The unit's affiliated P2000 ship is HMS Archer, which is predominantly used for training officer cadets.

The unit is commanded by its commanding officer (CO), usually a full-time Royal Navy lieutenant, lieutenant commander or Royal Marines captain. The remainder of its staff consists of a full-time chief petty officer acting as the unit coxswain (cox'n or coxn), a Royal Naval Reserve lieutenant as the unit's senior training officer (STO) and a number of training officers (TOs), who vary between Royal Naval Reserve acting sub-lieutenants, sub-lieutenants and lieutenants. This format, with the exception of rank, roughly mirrors the training staff and format of BRNC. In addition, the unit has a unit administration officer (UAO), who is a civilian and does not wear uniform.

URNU East Scotland primarily operates out of two locations, and is split into three divisions. Two of its divisions are based in Hepburn House, in Edinburgh, with its third division being based at RMR Strathmore Avenue, in Dundee. These two locations, while geographically separated, operate as one unit, and Officer Cadets train interchangeably at both locations.

== History ==
=== Aberdeen ===
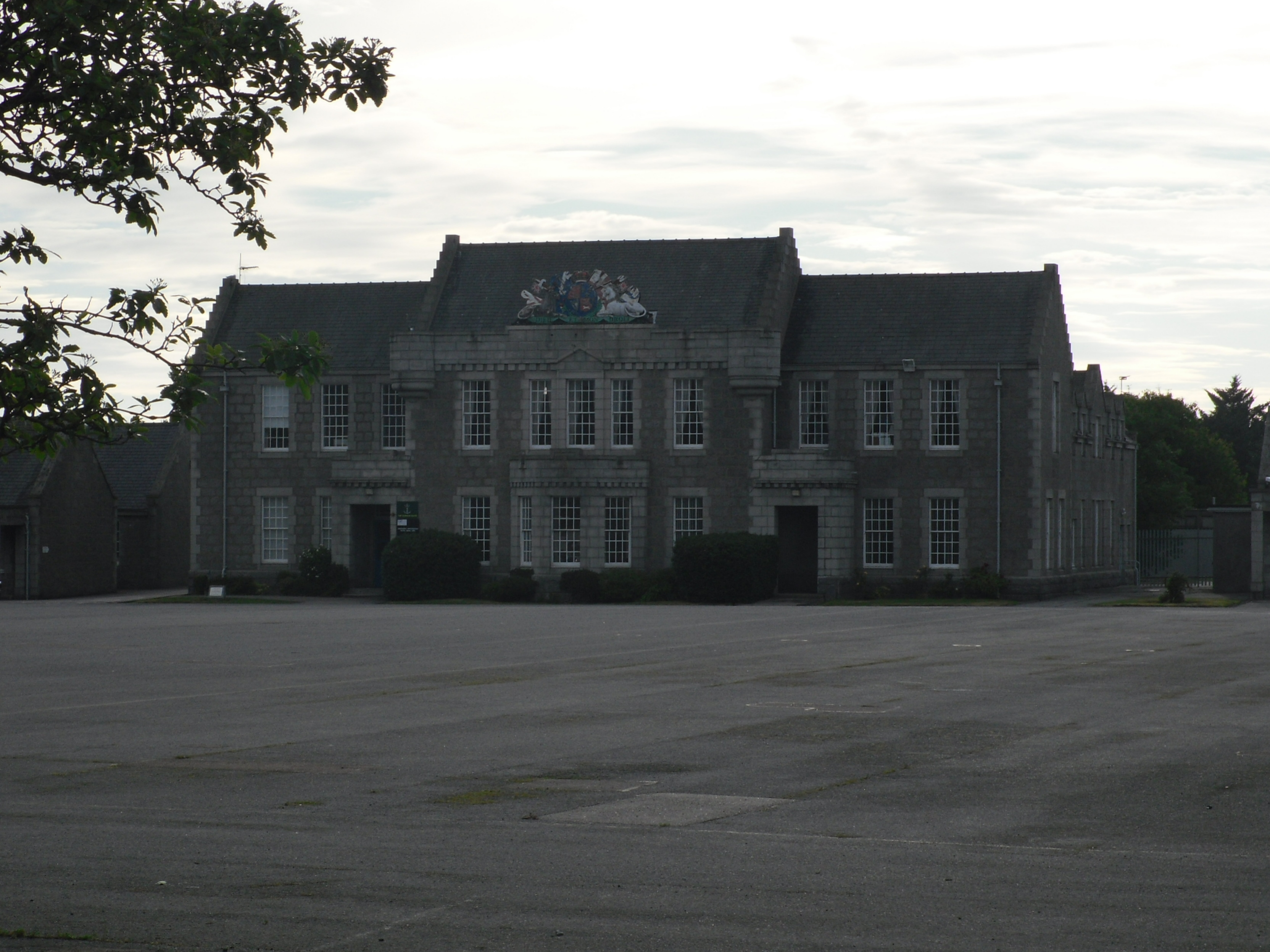
Gordon Barracks in Aberdeen, the old home of the Aberdeen URNU

URNU East Scotland is the oldest of all the URNUs and was originally formed in 1967 as the Aberdeen Universities' Royal Naval Unit (AURNU) in Aberdeen, Scotland to encourage STEM undergraduates to join the RN from the University of Aberdeen and Robert Gordon University. The unit was based at Gordon Barracks in Bridge of Don, in the north of the city.

Aberdeen URNU's first training ship was HMS Thornham, which was converted to a training ship at the Royal Naval Dockyard Rosyth in 1967 for the use of the unit. After the ship was broken up in 1985, the units training duties were moved to HMS Chaser, being replaced by HMS Archer in 1991. During the entire time the three ships were based there, they were the northernmost commissioned warships in the Royal Naval Fleet.

In 1978, HMS Thornham, with AURNU OCs on board, became the first foreign warship to visit the Danish city of Roskilde since the Viking times, when the five Skuldelev ships were sunk in the waterway of Peberrenden, c. 20km north of the city.

After being a male-only unit for its first 20 years, Aberdeen URNU finally allowed women to join its ranks in 1987, being the first URNU nation-wide to do so. Women initially joined wearing the cap badge and uniform of the Women's Royal Naval Service, before its full integration into the Royal Navy in 1993.

For a period between 1989 and 1991, while HMS Archer was being handed off to the Aberdeen URNU, the unit was commanded by (then) Lieutenant Tim Fraser, who is the former Vice-Chief of the Defence Staff, holding the rank of admiral. Immediately following Lt Fraser's command of the unit, between 1991 and 1993 AURNU and HMS Archer were commanded by (then) Lieutenant John Clink, who subsequently achieved the rank of rear admiral.

In 2005, Aberdeen URNU and HMS Archer had their first female commanding officer, (then) Lt Samantha Coulton, less than 5 years after the first female CO of a warship, (then) Lt Mel Robinson took command of Cardiff URNU (now URNU Wales) and its tender, HMS Express.

From the 2012 academic year, Aberdeen URNU paused its recruitment in anticipation of a move to Edinburgh, which occurred the following year.

=== Edinburgh ===
In 2012, the unit and HMS Archer were moved to the capital, Edinburgh, due to political pressures, allegedly relating to the Scottish independence referendum, which was announced earlier that year. The former Aberdeen URNU was provisionally named the East of Scotland Universities' Royal Naval Unit (ESURNU), before soon changing its name to the Edinburgh Universities' Royal Naval Unit (EURNU). The unit was moved to Hepburn House in Bonnington, northeast of the city centre, while HMS Archer was moved to be berthed first at Rosyth, then to its current location in Leith. As part of this shift, the unit began exclusively recruiting from the University of Edinburgh, Heriot-Watt University, Edinburgh Napier University and Queen Margaret University.

URNUES, once moving to Edinburgh, gave its commitment to the 15 remaining Aberdeen students to see through their training to the end. They would travel down to Edinburgh or Rosyth periodically for their training. One of these students was (then) Hon Mid Andrew Bowie, who, since becoming a Member of Parliament in 2017, has been petitioning the government for the unit and Archer's relocation back to Aberdeen, to no avail.

In June 2017, EURNU OCs onboard HMS Archer, in company with HM Ships Smiter, Ranger and Exploit, deployed to the Baltic to take part in NATO's BALTOPS exercise, the first time that Royal Navy P2000s have been involved in such an exercise. Archer, and OCs from the unit, have been attending the exercise every year since, with the exception of 2022, due to increased tensions in the region following the re-escalation of the Russo-Ukrainian War.

In 2021, in an URNU-wide naming change, the unit was renamed University Royal Naval Unit Edinburgh (URNUE).

In 2022, URNU Edinburgh opened a satellite division based in Dundee known then as URNU Edinburgh, Tayside Division.

=== East Scotland ===
In mid-2022, Rear Admiral Jude Terry, Director of People and Training, approved the change of the unit name from URNU Edinburgh to the University Royal Naval Unit East Scotland to better reflect the new, expanded footprint of the unit, after the then-recent inclusion of Officer Cadets from the Tayside region, beginning in the autumn of 2021.

== URNU East Scotland today ==
Unit division locations

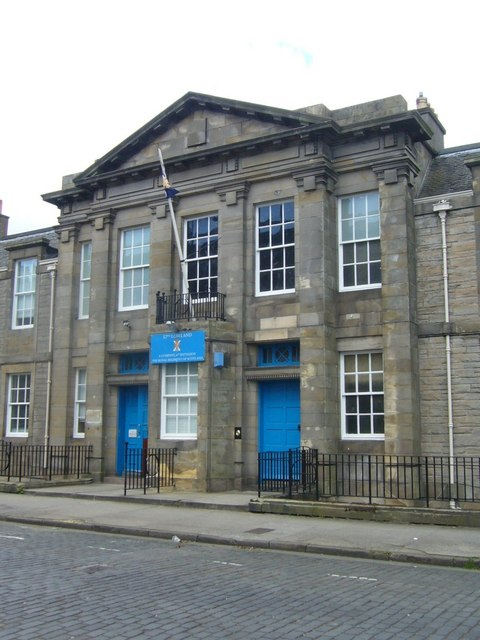
Hepburn House in Edinburgh, home of the Edinburgh Divisions

The unit is currently split into three divisions, where two of the divisions, the Cunningham and Cochrane divisions, named after two of the Royal Navy's most eminent Scottish Admirals, Adm. of the Fleet Andrew Cunningham, 1st Viscount Cunningham of Hyndhope and Adm. of the Red Thomas Cochrane, 10th Earl of Dundonald respectively, are based in Edinburgh, with the last division, the Tay division, being based in Dundee. Each of these divisions has a divisional officer, in charge of the wellbeing of the division.

In Edinburgh, the unit uses the basement of Hepburn House as its main training area, consisting of two classrooms, an office, a galley, a casual lounge area (known as the Buffers' Shack) and a drill hall, which is shared with A company, 52nd Lowland, 6th Battalion, The Royal Regiment of Scotland. In addition, the unit has use of the Sergeants' mess on the first floor of the building, dubbing it, in naval fashion, the Gunroom.

After seeing a slight dip in numbers during the COVID-19 pandemic, the unit has recently expanded to encompass the majority of universities over the east coast of Scotland, and is looking to recruit more Officer Cadets and Training Officers.

The unit is also expanding its outreach and regularly undertakes exercises and adventurous training with its counterparts in the Scotland and Northern Ireland region, URNU Glasgow and URNU Belfast.

== Affiliated establishments ==
URNU East Scotland is affiliated with a number of ships, which often lend a few spaces on board for Officer Cadets to undergo training. These are never in combat zones, as URNU OCs are non-combatants, however may be in faux-battle scenarios or training exercises, such as BALTOPS.

URNU East Scotland is also affiliated with a number of other naval and military units, who lend either their buildings, training staff, or expertise, to help train officer cadets. In addition, the unit collaborates with a number of other University Service Units (USUs) in military training, adventurous training and social events.

The unit is also overseen by a number of Military Education Committees (MECs), who uphold the relationship of the USUs with their affiliated universities.

A list of these ships, units and committees is as follows:

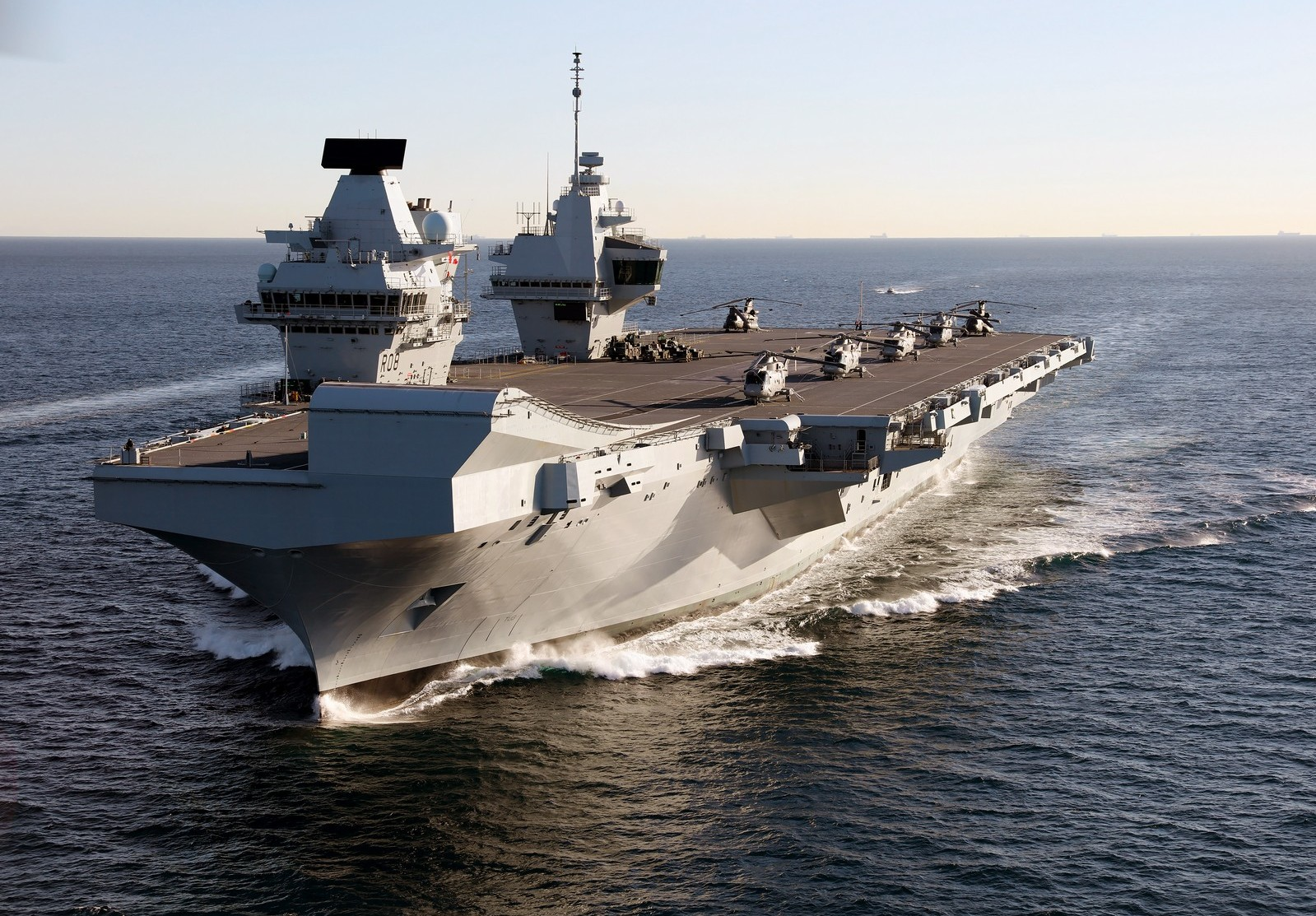
HMS Queen Elizabeth in Gibraltar, February 2018

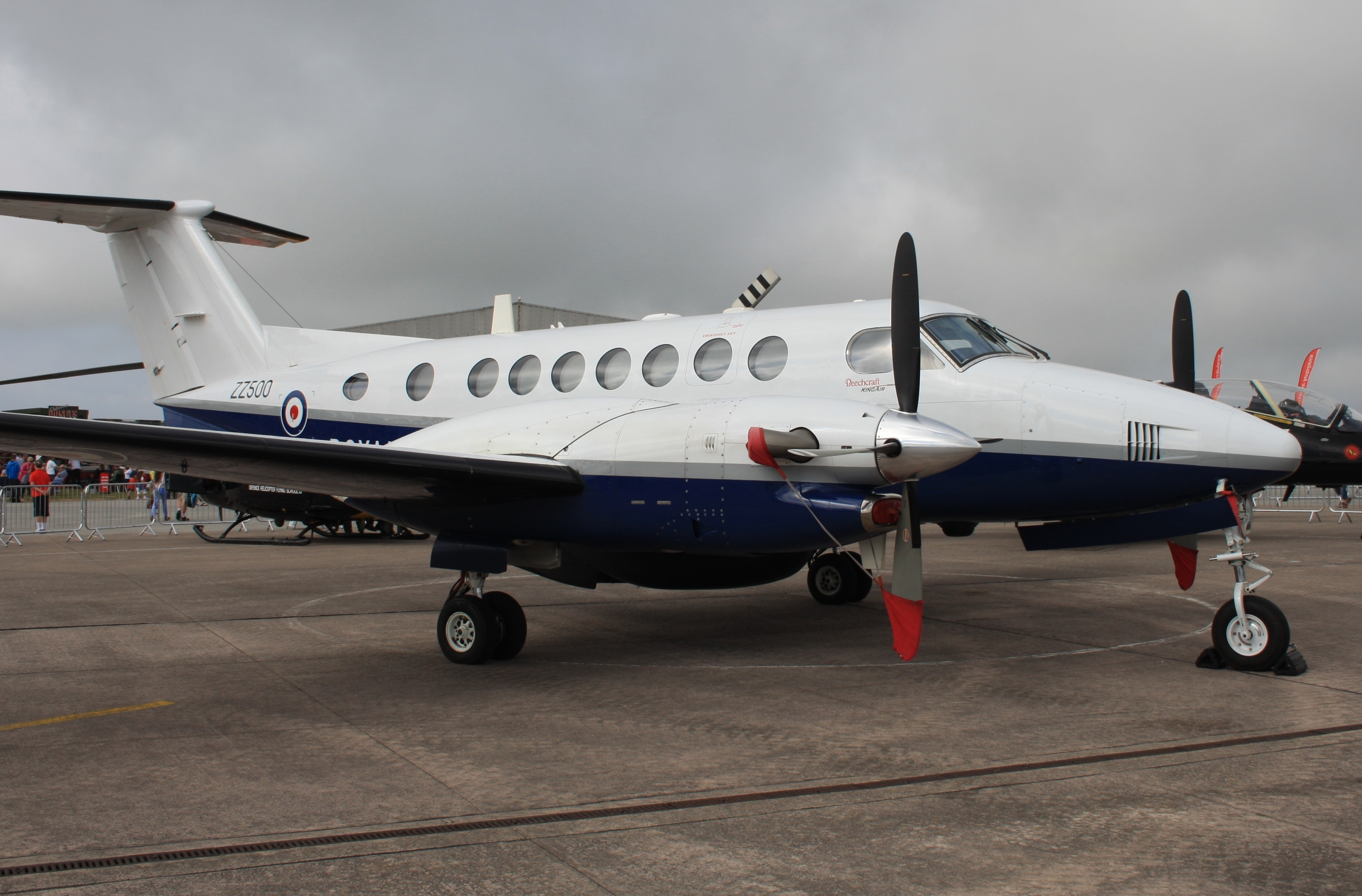
The Hawker Beechcraft Avenger T1, the main training aircraft of 750 Naval Air Squadron

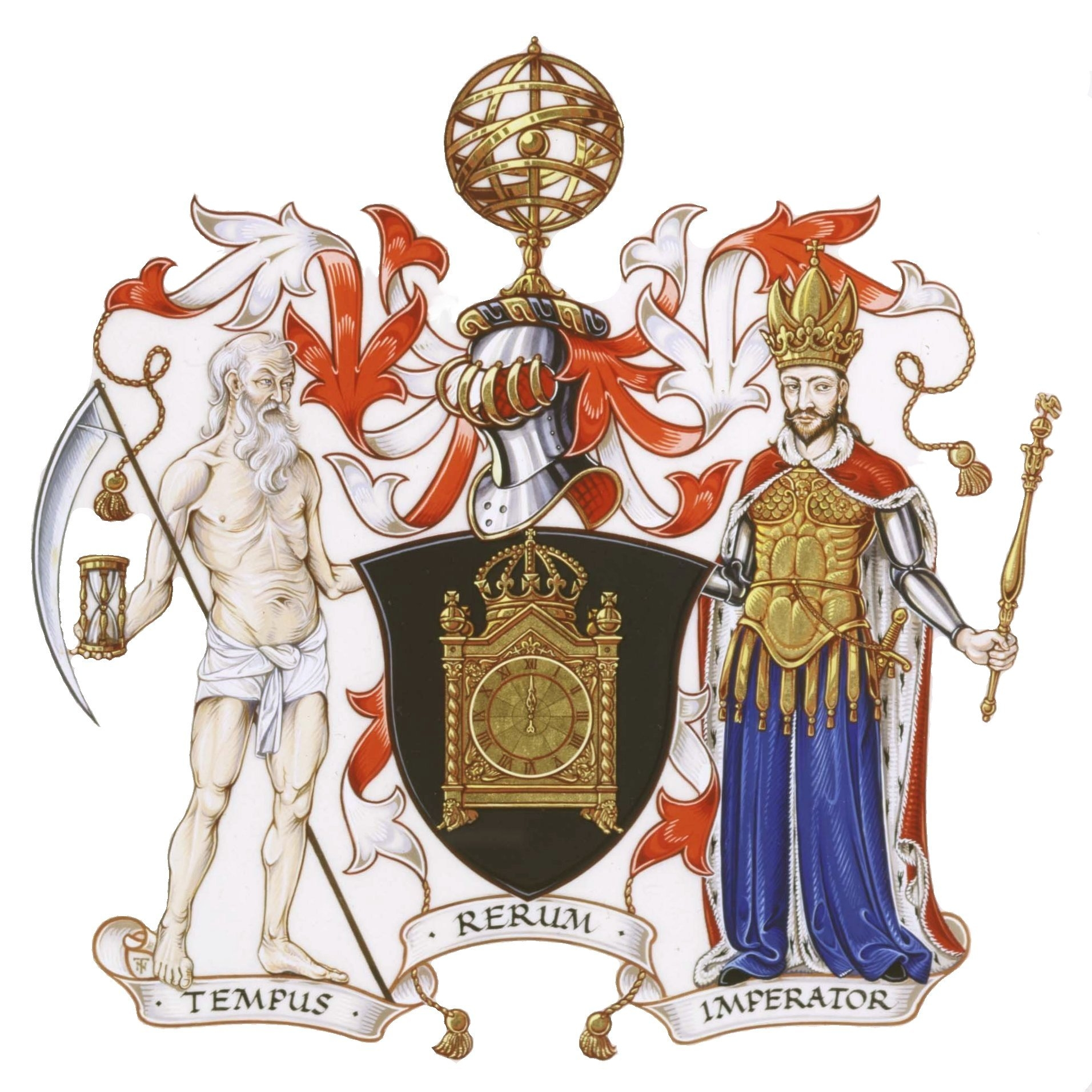
Coat of arms of the Worshipful Company of Clockmakers

=== Ships ===
- HMS Archer
- HMS Queen Elizabeth
- HMS Vanguard
- HMS Diamond
- TSS Caron

=== Units ===
==== Naval Units ====
- 750 Naval Air Squadron
- 819 Naval Air Squadron (former, 1967 - 2001)
- HMS Scotia
  - HMS Scotia, Tay Division
- Royal Marines Reserve Scotland
  - Royal Marines Reserve Scotland, Dundee Detachment
- Coastal Forces Squadron
- Sea Cadet Corps
  - Aberdeen Sea Cadets
  - Stonehaven Sea Cadets

==== University Service Units (USUs) ====
- University Officers' Training Corps
  - City of Edinburgh UOTC
  - Tayforth UOTC
- East of Scotland Universities' Air Squadron

==== Military Education Committees (MECs) ====
- City of Edinburgh MEC
- Tayforth MEC
- Aberdeen MEC

=== Other ===
- Worshipful Company of Clockmakers
- Town of Stonehaven
- Strongbow Cider (informal) (Note: This association between HMS Archer (and by extension the unit) and the cider brand has been in place since at least 1997, and originated due to the company's and the ship's link to the 'bow and arrow' iconography.)

== Training ships ==
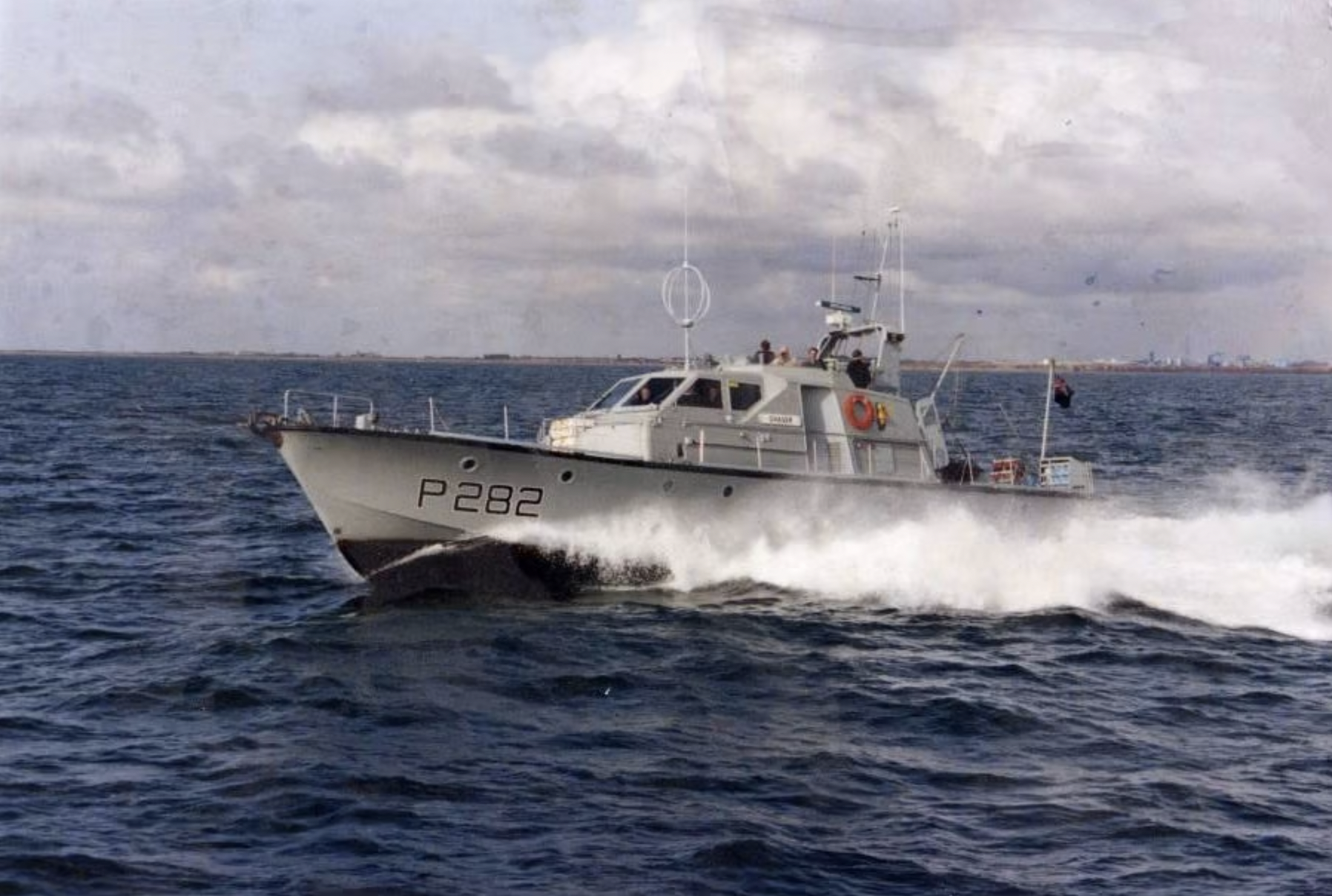
HMS Chaser off Hartlepool c.1991

The role of a training ship in the unit, sometimes known as the unit's tender, is to provide opportunities for Officer Cadets to receive practical training and gain experience afloat. The training ships' programmes are generally divided into two durations of training – a weekend, or the longer deployments that take place during the university Easter and summer holidays, which can be 1–3 weeks long.

The wooden name boards of both former training ships, HMS Thornham and HMS Chaser, currently reside in the primary gunroom of the unit in Hepburn House.

=== HMS Thornham ===
HMS Thornham, built in 1958, was one of 93 ships of the Ham-class of inshore minesweepers and was named after the civil parish of Thornham in Norfolk. She was the Aberdeen URNU's first tender, and was based at Aberdeen Harbour throughout her service with the unit.

She was converted to a training ship at the Royal Naval Dockyard Rosyth in 1967 (just prior to the foundation of AURNU) for the sole use of the unit. The ship was broken up in 1985, and the unit's training duties were handed off to HMS Chaser the same year.

She gives her name to the 'Thornham Prize', which is given at the annual prize-giving ceremony to the officer cadet who shows the most proficiency with working on ship at sea.

=== HMS Chaser ===
HMS Chaser was built in Southampton, originally used for RNR training, before being transferred to the Aberdeen URNU in 1985. Like Thornham, she was also permanently based at Aberdeen Harbour for the duration of her service with the unit. She served in her role for six years, until 1991, after which she was decommissioned and sold to the Lebanese Navy a year later. She is currently in use as the Lebanese patrol boat Jbeil.

=== HMS Archer ===
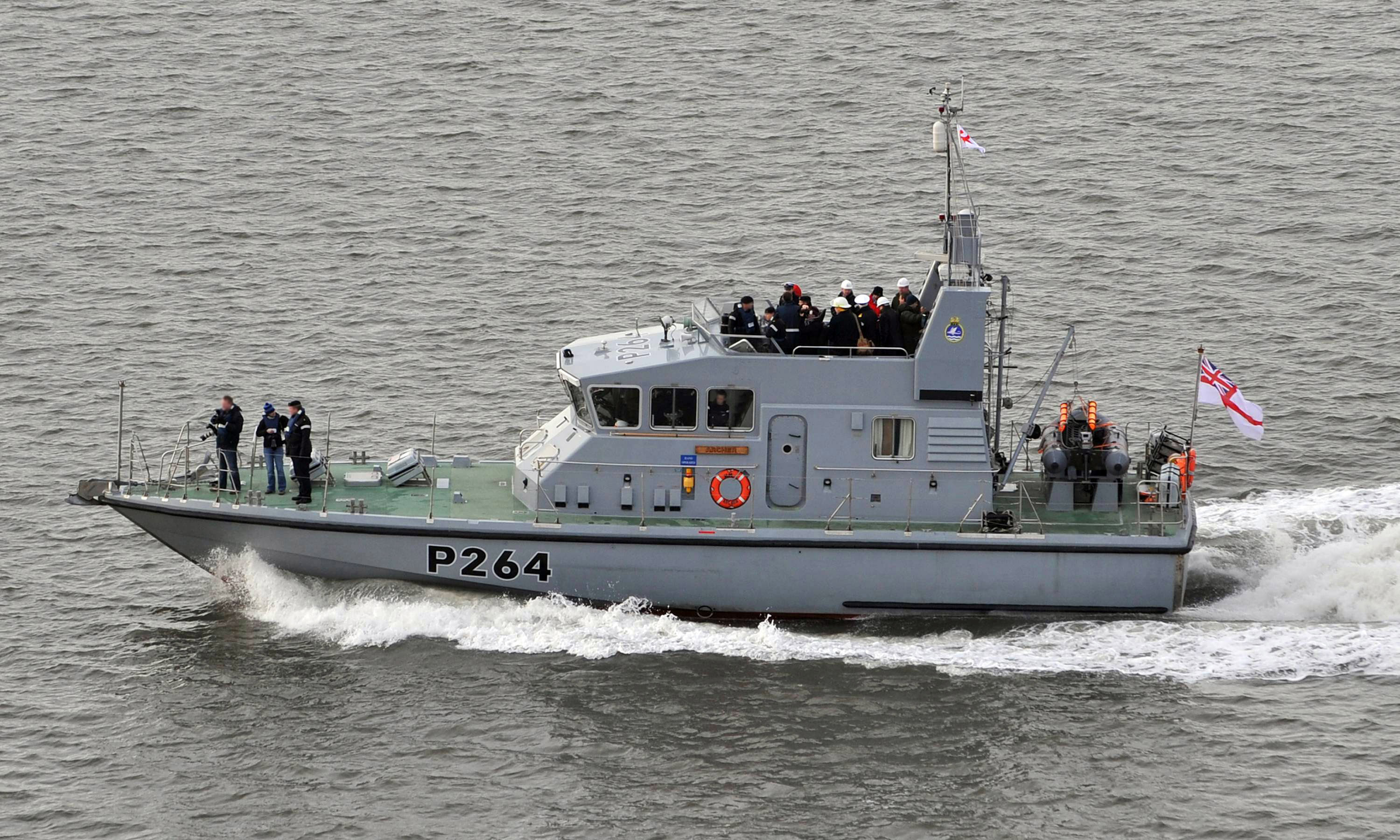
HMS Archer afloat with a commodore onboard

HMS Archer has been the unit's training ship since 1991, and until March 2017, was commanded by the commanding officer of the unit. Since then, she has had her own CO, and although her primary role is still to train the officer cadets of URNUES, she now performs more tasks with the Coastal Forces Squadron, of which she is now a member. Officer cadets from the unit are often taken on board during these deployments to undergo operational training.

She was originally berthed at Aberdeen Harbour, similar to her two predecessors, until 2012 when the unit was moved to Edinburgh. She was then temporarily based out of Rosyth Naval Dockyard until final arrangements were made to have her be berthed at Leith, where she remains today.

== Tay Division ==
In January 2021, after striking an agreement with HMS Scotia, Tay Division, the unit opened a satellite division known now as URNU East Scotland, Tay Division, named for the Firth of Tay which runs just south of Dundee, the city in which the division is based. It is based out of a Royal Marines Reserve base in the north of the city, RMR Strathmore Avenue (more fully called 'Royal Marines Reserve and Cadet Force Centre, Strathmore Avenue').

Its foundation was an important 'first' for the Royal Navy in regards to the URNU programme. Although the then URNU Edinburgh was a large and thriving unit, it was recognised that its distance from other cities and universities in the region was inhibiting recruitment at a time when the Royal Navy was actively expanding the URNU initiative.

Tay Division has become the testbed for a potential scheme to extend the URNU footprint, with it starting recruitment in the autumn of 2021, and starting training in early 2022.

The division, while under the jurisdiction of URNU East Scotland and its CO, has its own officer in charge (OiC) of the division, currently a part-time Lieutenant RNR. The administration and resources however, are still headquartered in Edinburgh, with the Tay Division having no dedicated full-time staff.

The new division was created to recruit Officer Cadets from the University of Dundee, Abertay University, the University of St Andrews, the University of Stirling, Perth College and, in a return to the unit's history, Robert Gordon University and the University of Aberdeen.

== Controversies ==
=== Relocation to Edinburgh ===
In July 2012, the unit and HMS Archer were moved from their old home of Aberdeen to the capital of Edinburgh. Once moving to Edinburgh, the unit gave its commitment to the 10 remaining Aberdeen students to see through their training to the end. One of these students was (then) A/Mid Andrew Bowie, former Vice Chairman of the Conservative Party, who, since becoming a Member of Parliament in 2017, has been petitioning the government for the unit and Archer's relocation back to Aberdeen.

The unit was allegedly moved due to political pressures relating to the Scottish independence referendum, which was announced earlier that year, however, a Royal Navy spokesperson, when asked in 2012, claimed that the reason for the move was because "Edinburgh offers more sheltered waters in which to conduct sea training weekends, and allows easy access to a wider variety of destinations during those weekends. Bowie, however, rebuts that the "end of [AURNU] left a major port and huge swathe of coastline without a permanent naval presence".

=== Sexual Assault Allegations ===
In November 2020, allegations emerged that the then commanding officer of HMS Archer, Lt. Rhys Christie, had raped a teenage officer cadet twice, after nights out in Eyemouth, Berwickshire and Ramsgate, Kent. Lt. Christie admitted to sleeping with the cadet, however denied that he had raped her, maintaining that she was sober enough to consent on both occasions. He was accused of 5 counts of rape.

It was claimed that the unnamed officer cadet was so drunk that she threw up at the pub, before being taken back to Lt. Christie's hotel room, where he slept with her, despite Christie's colleagues' wishes for her to return to the ship "for her own safety". Christie claimed that she "gave [him] no indication [that] the sex was not welcome" and that "she was smiling [and] there was positive body language". He admits that he abused his power, due to the disparity in rank and age and that "[he] knew that it was the wrong thing to do".

After a three-day trial in February 2021, held in Bulford Military Court, Christie was cleared of all charges of rape, with it later being revealed that the accusation of rape had been made because the officer cadet had felt "embarrassed" when people later found out about their relationship. Christie was told that he had “fundamentally failed” in his duty of care, and may not be fit to continue with his career in the Royal Navy. Christie remained in the Royal Navy for another year, leaving in January 2022.

It is for this reason that training officers and staff of the unit are not allowed to drink excessively with Officer Cadets, and must remain below 0.08% BAC (English legal driving limit) when in the company of Officer Cadets. Exceptions are only made for special events such as Trafalgar Night.

== Notable alumni ==
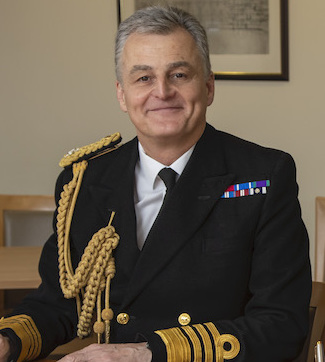
Adm Sir Tim Fraser KCB ADC

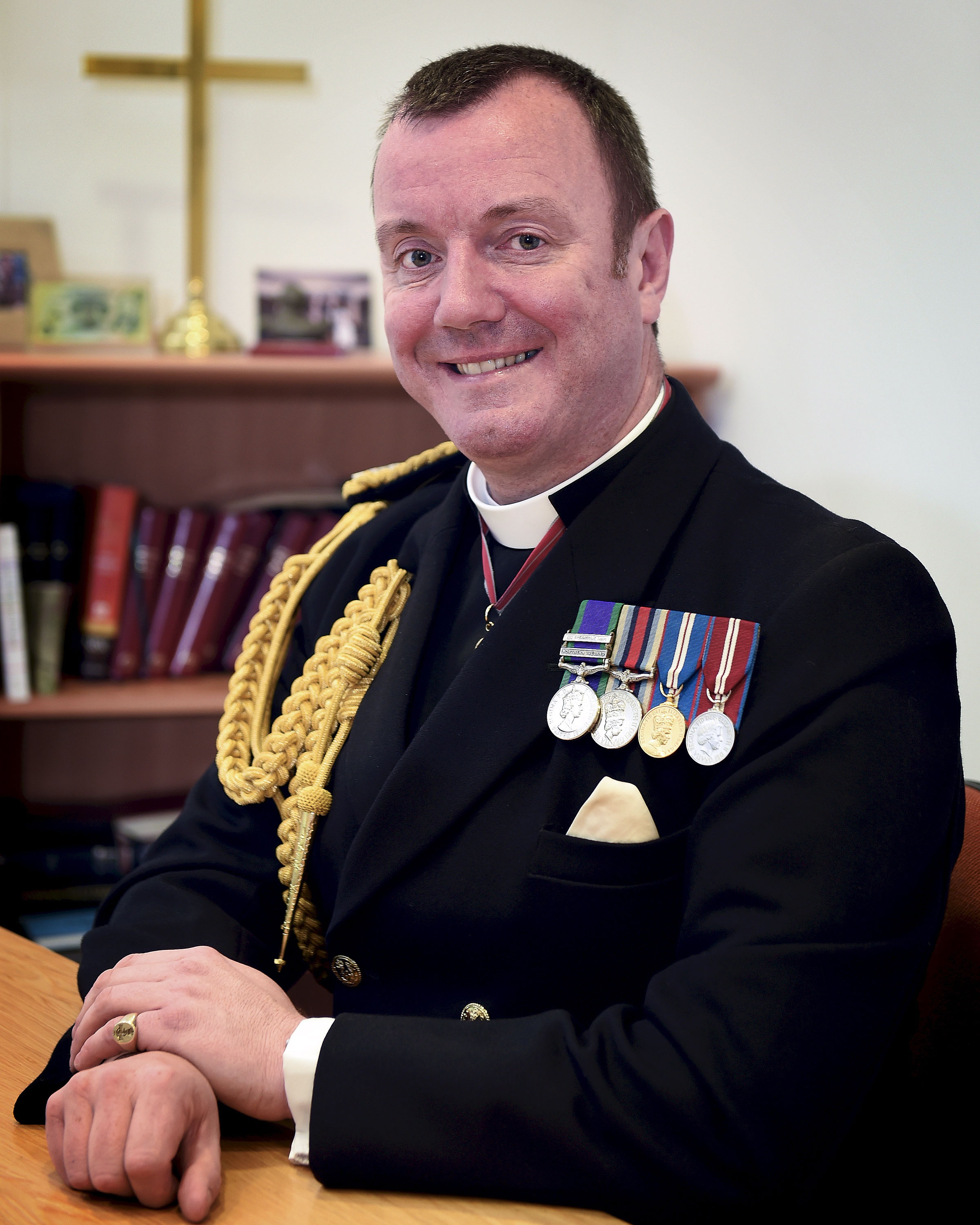
Chp Flt Scott Brown CBE QHC

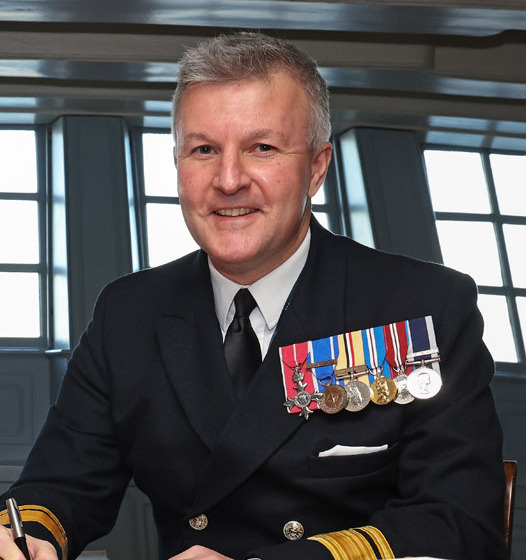
VAdm Phil Hally CB MBE

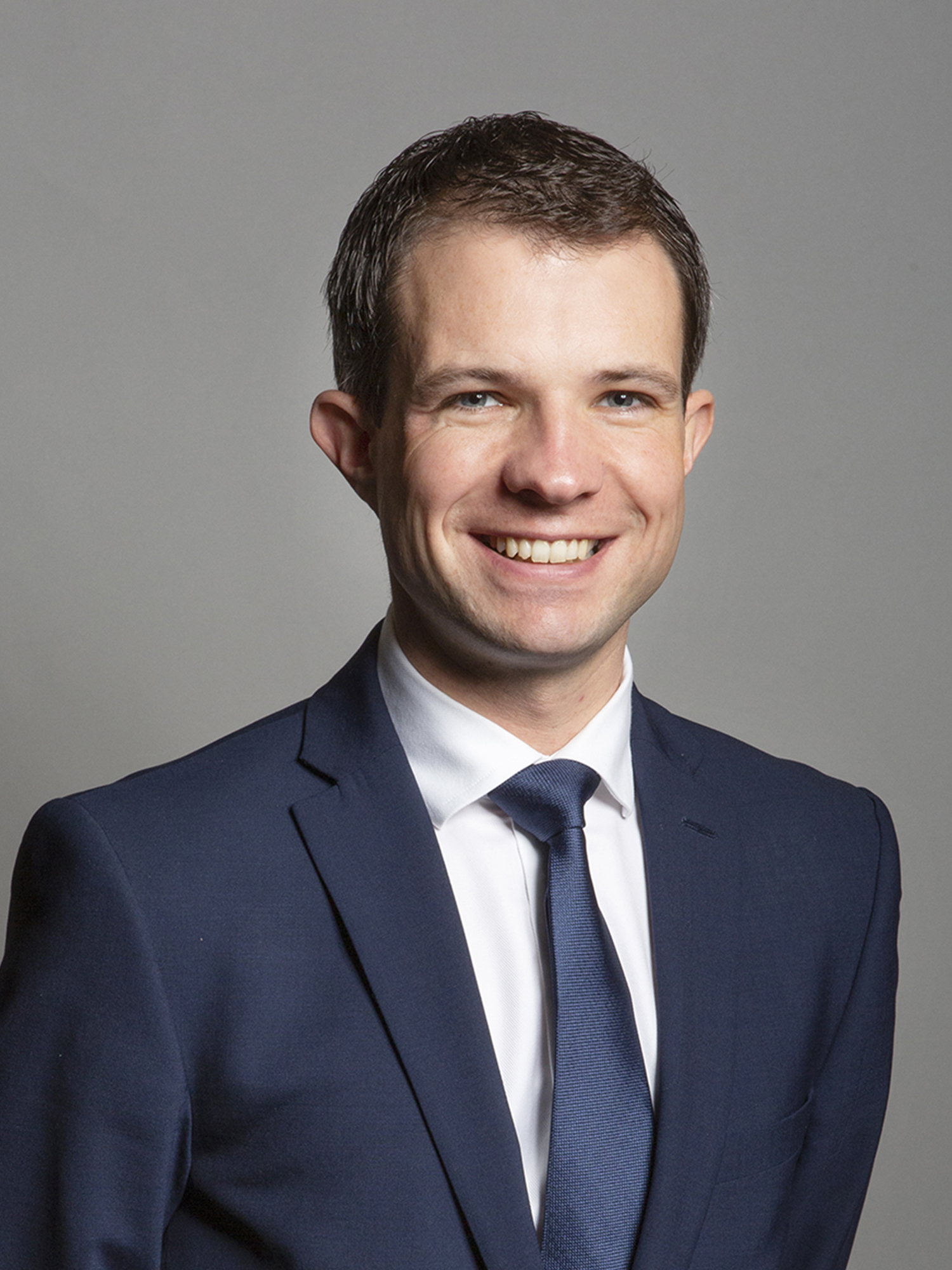
Andrew Bowie MP

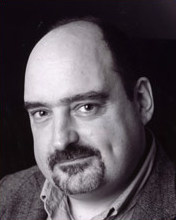
Angus Konstam

=== Royal Navy alumni ===
==== Commanding officers ====
- Admiral Sir Tim Fraser KCB ADC (1989–1991), former Vice-Chief of the Defence Staff
- Rear Admiral John Clink CBE (1991–1993), former rear admiral and Flag Officer Scotland, Northern England & Northern Ireland
- Commodore Richard Bridges (1974–1975), former commodore, Captain HMS Raleigh, and Commodore Amphibious Warfare

==== Officer cadets ====
- Chaplain of the Fleet The Reverend Scott Brown CBE QHC (1987–1992), the former Chaplain of the Fleet, senior chaplain of the Royal Navy
- Vice Admiral Phil Hally CB MBE (1987–1991), former vice admiral, chief of defence people and honorary captain of the Volunteer Cadet Corps
- Sub Lieutenant Rowann Sinclair (2017–2022), international and inter-service Rugby Union player, and current Worcester Warriors Women player

=== Civilian Alumni ===
- Andrew Bowie MP (2008–2013), Member of Parliament for West Aberdeenshire and Kincardine, former RN officer and current junior RNR Officer
- Angus Konstam (1971–1976), historian, author of popular history and former RN officer
- Alice Loxton (2016–2018), historian, TV presenter and internet personality best known for her TikTok account (~675k followers as of Oct 2023)

== Commanding officers ==
=== Aberdeen ===
HMS Thornham command shared with Aberdeen URNU

- 1967 – 1968 : Lt Cdr Douglas "Neil" Murray (Later Cdr)
- 1968 – 1969 : Lt Cdr Christopher Terrell
- 1969 – 1970 : unknown
- 1970 – 1971 : Lt Cdr William Crutchley
- 1971 – 1972 : Lt Cdr John Douglas
- 1972 – 1973 : unknown
- 1973 – 1974 : Lt Cdr Anthony Bensted
- 1974 – 1976 : Lt Cdr Richard Bridges (Later Cdre)
- 1976– 1978 : Lt Cdr Ian Parkinson
- 1978 – 1980 : Lt Cdr David Pritchard
- 1980 – 1981 : Lt Cdr David Ludbrook
- 1981 – 1982 : Lt Cdr Richard Potez
- 1982 – 1985 : Lt Cdr Henry Milner

HMS Chaser replaces HMS Thornham as AURNU's affiliated ship

- 1985 – 1987 : unknown
- 1987 – 1989 : Lt Cdr Colin Milne
- 1989 – 1991 : Lt Tim Fraser (Later Adm)

HMS Archer replaces HMS Chaser as AURNU's affiliated ship

- 1991 – 1991 : Lt Tim Fraser (Later Adm)
- 1991 – 1993 : Lt John Clink (Later RAdm)
- 1993 – 1995 : Lt Cdr Glen MacDonald
- 1995 – 1997 : Lt Cdr Malcolm Pollock (Later Cdr)
- 1997 – 1999 : Lt James Clark (Later Lt Cdr)
- 1999 – 2001 : Lt Cdr Ian Wiseman (Later Cdr)
- 2001 – 2003 : Lt Paul Hammond (Later Cdr)
- 2003 – 2005 : Lt Stuart Armstrong (Later Cdr)
- 2005 – 2007 : Lt Samantha "Sam" Coulton (née Scott) (Note: Lt. Coulton got married and changed her name while she was in command of HMS Archer and AURNU.) (Later Lt Cdr)
- 2007 – 2009 : Lt Cdr Jamie Wells
- 2009 – 2012 : Lt Michael Hutchinson (Later Lt Cdr)
- 2012 – 2012 : Lt James Martin

=== Edinburgh ===
- 2012 – 2014 : Lt James Martin
- 2014 – 2015 : Lt Iain Giffin
- 2015 – 2017 : Lt Andrew Platt (Later Lt Cdr)

HMS Archer and Edinburgh URNU command separated

- 2017 – 2018 : unknown
- 2018 – 2020 : Lt Cdr Ollie Loughran
- 2020 – 2022 : Lt Gordon Pickthall

=== East Scotland ===
- 2022 – 2022 : Lt Gordon Pickthall
- 2022 – 2024 : Lt Cdr Nick Bates
- 2024 - 2025 : Lt Megan Burgoyne
- 2025 – present : Lt Mark Thompson

== See also ==
- Armed forces in Scotland
- Military history of Scotland

=== University Service Units ===
- University Service Units (USUs), the umbrella that the URNU, UOTC, and UAS fall under.
  - Tayforth Universities Officers' Training Corps, URNU East Scotland's British Army counterpart in St Andrews, Dundee and Stirling
  - East of Scotland Universities Air Squadron, URNU East Scotland's Royal Air Force counterpart, covering roughly the same geographic area

=== Other ===
- Defence Technical Undergraduate Scheme
- Reserve Officers Training Corps, the United States' equivalent to the USUs
  - Naval Reserve Officers Training Corps, the United States' equivalent to the URNU
