= Tayforth UOTC =

Tayforth Universities Officers' Training Corps
- Active: 1860 – present
- Allegiance: United Kingdom
- Branch: British Army
- Type: Training
- Role: Army Officer Training
- Size: 2 Squadrons & 1 Company
- Part of: Sandhurst Group; Army Reserves (Group B)
- Locations: A Sqn - Wyvern House, St Andrews; B Sqn - Park Wynd, Dundee; C Coy - Forthside Barracks, Stirling
- Mottos: ΑΙΕΝ ΑΡΙΣΤΕΥΕΙΝ (AIEN ARISTEUEIN) "Ever to Excel"
- Website: Official site at army.mod.uk

Commanders
- Commanding Officer (ATOTR): Lt Col M Witko
- Honorary Colonel: vacant

Insignia
- Tartan: Government no. 8
- Abbreviation: TUOTC

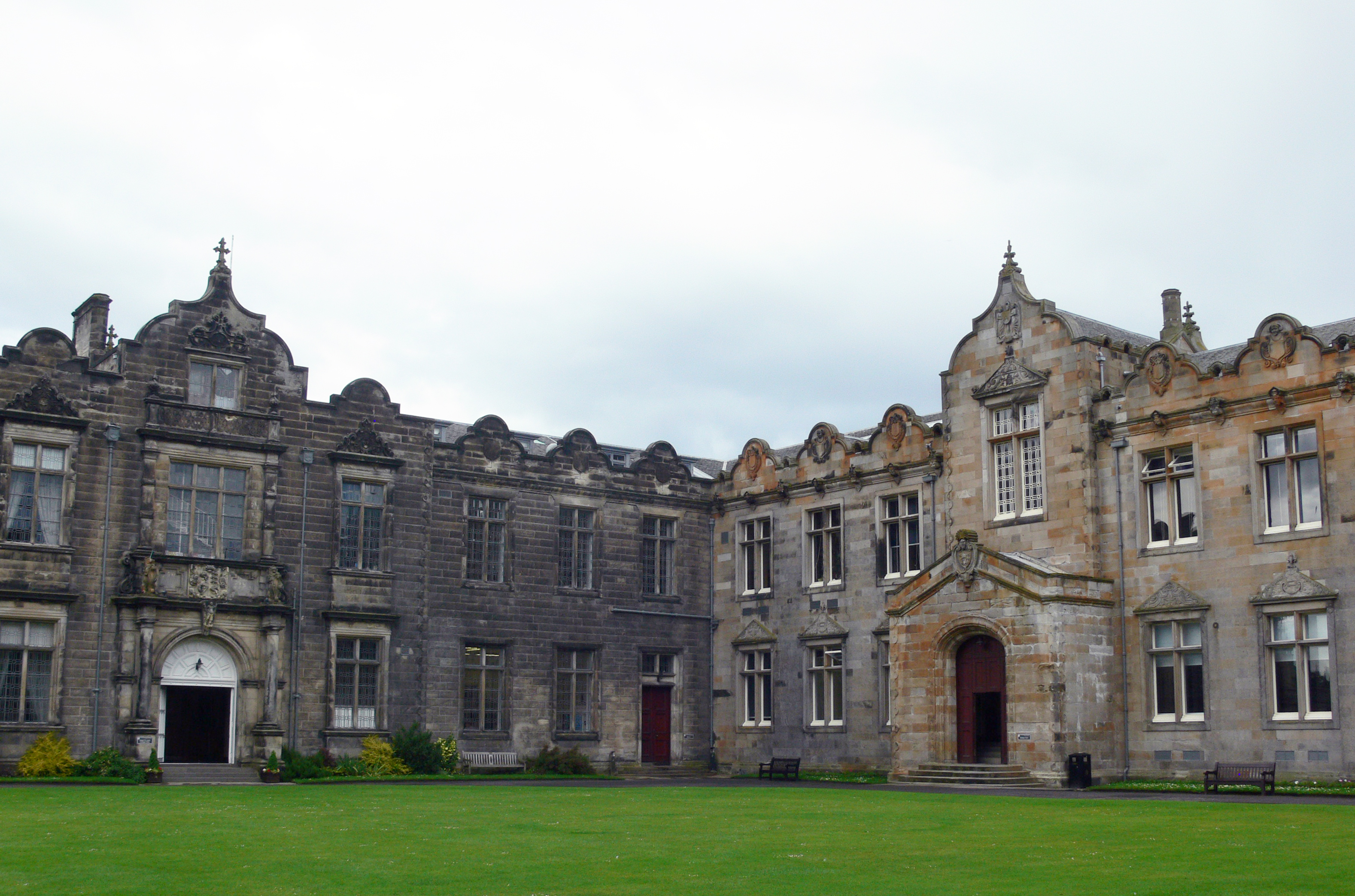
St Salvator's Quad, where A Sqn. Tayforth UOTC parade on Remembrance Day

Tayforth Universities Officers' Training Corps is a British Army reserve unit, of the University Officers' Training Corps based in Scotland.

It is formed of three sub-units: A Squadron, which draws its members from the University of St Andrews, B Squadron, which draws its members from the universities of Dundee and Abertay, and C Company, which draws its members from Stirling University.

== History ==
=== Pre-UOTC ===
Tayforth is descended from a militia formed from the time of Charles II and the Jacobite rebellions of 1715 and 1745. In 1859 a committee was formed in St Andrews to form a volunteer corps of both rifle and artillery. This was carried out in a town meeting on 5 December 1859 and was carried unanimously and 3rd (St Andrews) Fife Artillery Volunteers was formed.

In 1881 Professor Peter Redford Scott Lang formed the St Andrews University Volunteer Battery of Artillery, named the Anstruther No 7 Battery of the 1st Fife Brigade of Garrison Artillery, although made up entirely of university students and staff. In 1883 the Battery changed its name to University Company 1st Fife VA and the Senatus Academicus pledged £20 per year to the Battery. Throughout its early history, the Battery followed an annual training programme including an annual camp, an annual dinner and a church service and parade in St Salvator's Quadrangle. In conjunction with the Battery, in 1906 the University formed a Military Education Committee (MEC) to commence a course in Military Education.

=== Post-UOTC ===
In 1908 the concept of the Officers' Training Corps was formed, and St Andrews, being the oldest university in Scotland and the third oldest in the UK, was naturally interested in this. A Military Education Committee was required to constitute the new Unit. As St Andrews already had an MEC set up, they were able to complete the whole range of business in one afternoon, forming St Andrews University OTC. Such business included deciding on the uniform. The cap badge was decided to be the University shield surmounted by the King's Crown. Whilst this is no longer the cap badge it is still worn as the undress sporran badge and can be seen in A Squadron mess as the squadron crest.

During World War I, 415 former members of the University Company served in the army. The contingent continued to train throughout the war, although with depleted numbers. In 1916 the medical students began to train independently and were recognised as a sub-unit of the contingent. Sadly 78 members of the corps lost their lives, their names are remembered on a memorial board in the A Squadron Mess.

Following the formation of Dundee University from University College Dundee, a part of the University of St Andrews, the OTC became St Andrews and Dundee University OTC. With the Addition of Stirling University, the OTC was renamed Tayforth Universities OTC, as St Andrews, Dundee and Stirling Universities OTC was considered a bit of a mouthful. The name Tayforth was chosen as Dundee is situated on the River Tay and Stirling on the River Forth. The concern was that St Andrews, as the senior university may not agree with this name, however as the River Tay and the River Forth are the boundaries of the Kingdom of Fife, within which St Andrews is located, it was approved by the MEC.

In May 1976, the Old Wyvernians formed as a non-regimental association for the former officers and cadets who had been based at St Andrews, at the instigation of Rob Wherrett, then one of the 2nd Lieutenants based in St. Andrews who served with the unit from 1971-1976. The founding Treasurer of the Old Wyvernians for many years was Ian King RVM who, on leaving the UOTC, had joined the London Scottish and rose to become their Pipe Major - hence personal piper to the Queen Mother in London. The inaugural meeting of the Tayforth Regimental Association was held on 16 June 1984 and was the first of its kind. Whilst other OTC's followed suit The Tayforth Regimental Association is the oldest of its kind.

In 2024 Lady Louise Mountbatten-Windsor, the daughter of Prince Edward, Duke of Edinburgh, attested and joined Tayforth UOTC.

== Honorary Colonels ==
- – November 2021 : Lieutenant General Sir Edward Smyth-Osbourne, KCVO, CBE
- 1 December 2021 – August 2026 : Major General Alastair Bruce of Crionaich, CB, OBE

== See also ==
- University Royal Naval Unit East Scotland, the Royal Navy counterpart in St Andrews, Dundee and Stirling
- East of Scotland Universities Air Squadron, the Royal Air Force counterpart
- Armed forces in Scotland
- Military history of Scotland
