= Angus Konstam =

Scottish historian and author (born 1960)

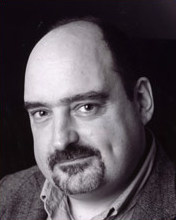
- Born: 2 January 1960 (age 66); Aberdeen, Scotland
- Occupations: Writer, historian
- Writing career
- Genre: Popular history
- Subjects: Naval history, maritime history, historical atlas, piracy, Blackbeard
- Website: www.anguskonstam.com

Angus Konstam (/kɒnstæm/; born 2 January 1960) is a Scottish writer of popular history. Born in Aberdeen, Scotland and raised on the Orkney Islands, he has written more than a hundred books on maritime history, naval history, historical atlases, with a special focus on the history of piracy. He is a fellow of the Royal Historical Society, and in 2025 he was inducted into the International Pirate Hall of Fame, in recognition of his historical work on the subject.

== Early life ==
Although born in Aberdeen, Scotland, he was raised in the Orkney Islands. In 1978, after leaving Kirkwall Grammar School at the age of 18 he left to join the Royal Navy. After initial officer training at the Britannia Royal Naval College, Dartmouth, and undergoing further naval training at sea, he went on to study history at Aberdeen University. During this time he was attached to the Aberdeen University Royal Naval Unit, and its tender, HMS Thornham. After receiving an MA degree, he returned to active service with the Royal Navy, during which time he visited many places that would later be written about in his books, including the Caribbean. He also gained useful knowledge of military service, customs, seamanship and navigation during this time. After leaving the service in 1983 he studied for a master's degree at the University of St Andrews. During this time he explored the new field of maritime archaeology and wrote his thesis on early naval artillery. Two decades later this formed the basis for Sovereigns of the Sea, his history of Renaissance warships.

== Career ==
=== United Kingdom ===
He left the navy in 1983, and the following year he began a Master of Letters in Maritime Studies at the University of St Andrews, a course which combined history with maritime archaeology. After completing his master's thesis on Renaissance Naval Artillery, he found a job in 1985 as a supervisor on an excavation in the River Thames near the Tower of London, paid for by the Royal Armouries.

While he was working in the Royal Armouries, the Tower and the Kremlin decided to swap exhibits – a "Treasures of the Tower" being shown in Moscow while "Treasures of the Kremlin" came to London. The curators of both museums were encouraged to exchange information, and to examine each other's collections. This ended up with Konstam studying the 18th-century Russian military. A mutual colleague introduced him to a historian working for Osprey Publishing, who wanted someone to write a book about Peter the Great's Army. The result was two small (15,000-word) books which first appeared in 1993 – the first easily accessible account of the foundation of the Russian army to appear in English.

=== United States ===
Konstam moved to Key West, Florida in 1995 and became the chief curator of the Mel Fisher Maritime Heritage Museum. Mel Fisher was a treasure hunter who found the wreck of the Spanish treasure galleon Nuestra Señora de Atocha off the Florida Keys. One of Konstam's jobs during this time was to create traveling exhibits which toured the United States. During the research for a pirate exhibition, he became increasingly interested in the subject of 18th-century piracy.

He spent six years in Key West and wrote several more books, there, including The History of Pirates (2002). As he gained more information through his research, he produced Piracy: The Complete History (2008), and then, to reach a wider audience, The World Atlas of Pirates (2009). In 2019 he published The Pirate World, an adaptation of his 2009 work for the same publisher. His The Pirate Menace is his most recent pirate history, concentrating on the activities of the pirates of Nassau during the early 18th century. Konstam also published a biography of the pirate Blackbeard.

=== Present ===
In early 2001 he returned to the United Kingdom, and after living in London and then Edinburgh, he returned to Orkney in 2019. He now resides in Herston in South Ronaldsay.

Konstam continues to research and write about naval and maritime history. Since 2001 he has written extensively on a number of maritime subjects. He currently has over 120 books in print.

In 2022, Konstam became a fellow of the Royal Historical Society (FrHistS). He served a three-year term as the chair of the Society of Authors in Scotland and has also served on the board of Publishing Scotland, as well as on other heritage-related committees.

He has also been a "talking head" on many cable TV and radio shows, and makes frequent appearances at book festivals and history events. In May 2025, Konstam was inducted into the International Pirate Hall of Fame, in recognition of his historical work on the subject. His book The Pirate Menace was cited as a major contribution to pirate history. Konstam's next book though, Lords of the Salt Road, to be published in June 2026, is on a completely different theme - a history of the Norse Earls of Orkney, set in the Viking age.

== Complete list of work ==
- Lords of the Salt Road: The Norse Earls of Orkney and the Viking World Osprey Publishing 2026 ISBN 978-1-4728-7473-3
- The Pirate Menace: Uncovering the Golden Age of Piracy Osprey Publishing 2024 ISBN 9781472857736
- The Convoy: HG-76: Taking the Fight to Hitler's U-Boats Osprey Publishing 2023 ISBN 9781472857682
- 100 Greatest Battles Osprey Publishing 2023 ISBN 9781472856944
- Mutiny on the Spanish Main: HMS Hermione and the Royal Navy's revenge Osprey Publishing 2020 ISBN 9781472833792.
- Hunt the Bismarck: The pursuit of Germany's most famous battleship Osprey Publishing 2019 ISBN 9781472833860.
- The Pirate World Osprey Publishing 2019 ISBN 9781472830975.
- Viking Warrior: Operations Manual Haynes Publishing 2018 ISBN 9781785211737.
- Big Guns: Artillery on the Battlefield Casemate Publishers 2017 ISBN 9781612004884.
- Jutland 1916: Twelve hours to win the war Aurum Press 2016 ISBN 1781312885.
- Pirates: Predators of the Seas Skyhorse Publishing 2016 ISBN 9781510702851, with Roger Kean.
- Battleship Bismarck, 1936-41:Owner's Workshop Manual Haynes Publishing 2015 ISBN 9780857335098.
- Bannockburn: Scotland's greatest battle for Independence Aurum Press 2014 ISBN 1781312877.
- Naval Miscellany Osprey Publishing 2010 ISBN 9781846039898.
- The World Atlas of Pirates The Lyons Press 2010 ISBN 9781599214740.
- The Battle of North Cape: The death-ride of the Scharnhorst, 1943 Pen & Sword Maritime 2009 ISBN 9781844158560.
- There Was a Soldier: First-Hand Accounts of the Scottish Soldier from 1707 to the Present Day Hachette Scotland 2009 ISBN 9780755318612.
- Piracy: The Complete History Osprey Publishing 2008 ISBN 9781846032400.
- Sovereigns of the Sea: The Quest to Build the Perfect Renaissance Battleship John Wiley & Sons 2008 ISBN 9780470116678.
- Cities of the Renaissance World Compendium Publishing 2008 ISBN 9781906347109, with Michael Swift.
- 100 Greatest Battles Osprey Publishing 2023 ISBN 9781472856944
- Mutiny on the Spanish Main: HMS Hermione and the Royal Navy's revenge Osprey Publishing 2020 ISBN 9781472833792.
- Hunt the Bismarck: The pursuit of Germany's most famous battleship Osprey Publishing 2019 ISBN 9781472833860.
- The Pirate World Osprey Publishing 2019 ISBN 9781472830975.
- Viking Warrior: Operations Manual Haynes Publishing 2018 ISBN 9781785211737.
- Big Guns: Artillery on the Battlefield Casemate Publishers 2017 ISBN 9781612004884.
- Jutland 1916: Twelve hours to win the war Aurum Press 2016 ISBN 1781312885.
- Pirates: Predators of the Seas Skyhorse Publishing 2016 ISBN 9781510702851, with Roger Kean.
- Battleship Bismarck, 1936-41:Owner's Workshop Manual Haynes Publishing 2015 ISBN 9780857335098.
- Bannockburn: Scotland's greatest battle for Independence Aurum Press 2014 ISBN 1781312877.
- Naval Miscellany Osprey Publishing 2010 ISBN 9781846039898.
- The World Atlas of Pirates The Lyons Press 2010 ISBN 9781599214740.
- The Battle of North Cape: The death-ride of the Scharnhorst, 1943 Pen & Sword Maritime 2009 ISBN 9781844158560.
- There Was a Soldier: First-Hand Accounts of the Scottish Soldier from 1707 to the Present Day Hachette Scotland 2009 ISBN 9780755318612.
- Piracy: The Complete History Osprey Publishing 2008 ISBN 9781846032400.
- Sovereigns of the Sea: The Quest to Build the Perfect Renaissance Battleship John Wiley & Sons 2008 ISBN 9780470116678.
- Cities of the Renaissance World Compendium Publishing 2008 ISBN 9781906347109, with Michael Swift.
- Salerno 1943: The Allied invasion of Italy Pen & Sword Military 2007 ISBN 9781844155170.
- Blackbeard: America's Most Notorious Pirate John Wiley & Sons 2006 ISBN 9780471758853.
- Ghost Ships: Tales of Abandoned, Doomed and Haunted Vessels Greenwich Editions 2005 ISBN 08622887380.
- Civil War Ghost Stories Thunder Bay Press 2005 ISBN 1592234828.
- PT Boat Squadrons: US Navy Torpedo Boats Ian Allen 2005 (Spearhead Series) ISBN 978-0-7110-3044-2.
- The Pocket Book of Civil War Battle Sites Chartwell books 2004 ISBN 0785819207
- The Pocket Book of Civil War Weapons Chartwell Books 2004 ISBN 0785819193
- 7th U-Boat Flotilla: Dönitz's Atlantic Wolves Ian Allen 2003 (Spearhead Series) ISBN 0711029571, with Jak P. Mallmann Showell.
- Hunt the Bismarck Naval Institute Press 2003 ISBN 1591143950.
- The Civil War: A Visual Encyclopedia PRC Publishing 2001 ISBN 1856486087 (General Editor).
- Warships: From the Galley to the Present Day PRC Publishing 2001 ISBN 0517163861, with Leo Marriott and Nick Grant.

=== Historical Atlas series ===
- Historical Atlas of the Renaissance Checkmark Books 2004 ISBN 0816057311, as Robert Ritchie
- Historical Atlas of the Napoleonic Era The Lyons Press 2003 ISBN 1585748676.
- Historical Atlas of Ancient Greece Checkmark Books 2003 ISBN 0816052204.
- Historical Atlas of the Viking World Thalamus Publishing 2002 ISBN 1902886038.
- Historical Atlas of the Crusades Thalamus Publishing 2002 ISBN 190288602 X.
- Historical Atlas of the Celtic World Checkmark Books 2001 ISBN 0816047618.
- Historical Atlas of Exploration Checkmark Books 2000 ISBN 0816042489.
- Atlas of Medieval Europe Checkmark Books 2000 ISBN 0816044694.
- The History of Shipwrecks Lyons Press 1999 ISBN 1558219706.
- The History of Pirates Lyons Press 1999 ISBN 1558219692.

=== Osprey Publishing titles ===
- ABDA Striking Force 1942; The joint Allied command lost at Java Sea [Fleet title 19] Osprey Publishing 2026 ISBN 9781472872500
- Königgrätz 1866: The Creation of Modern Germany [Campaign title 429] Osprey Publishing 2026 ISBN 9781472871282
- Warships at Dunkirk 1940 [New Vanguard title 349] Osprey Publishing 2026 ISBN 9781472872555
- Royal Navy Force H: Britain's strike force at Gibralrar [Fleet title 14] Osprey Publishing 2025 ISBN 9781472870940
- Royal Navy Monitors of World War II: Britain's battleship-calibre gunboats [New Vanguard title 343] Osprey Publishing 2025 ISBN 9781472868138
- Second Sirte 1942: The Desperate Battle to Relieve Malta [Campaign title 417] Osprey Publishing 2025 ISBN 9781472867223
- Super-Battleships of World War I: the lost battleships of the Washington Treaty [New Vanguard title 338] Osprey Publishing 2025 ISBN 9781472866905
- Convoy PQ-17 1942: Disaster in the Arctic [Campaign title 414] Osprey Publishing 2025 ISBN 9781472864277
- Royal Navy Grand Fleet 1914-18: Britain's Last Supreme Naval Fleet [Fleet title 10] Osprey Publishing 2025 ISBN 9781472866837
- Borneo 1945: The Last Major Campaign in the South-West Pacific [Campaign title 406] Osprey Publishing 2024 ISBN 9781472862242
- Sumatra 1944-45: The British Pacific Fleet's oil campaign in the Dutch East Indies [Air Campaign title 49] Osprey Publishing 2024 ISBN 9781472862419
- British Lend-Lease Warships 1940-45: the Royal Navy's American-built destroyers and frigates [New Vanguard title 330] Osprey Publishing 2024 ISBN 9781472861283
- Warships in the War of the Pacific 1879-83: South America's ironclad naval campaign [New Vanguard title 328] Osprey Publishing 2024 ISBN 9781472861245
- Royal Navy Home Fleet 1939-41: The last line of defence at Scapa Flow [Fleet title 5] Osprey Publishing 2024 ISBN 9781472861481
- Cape Matapan 1941: Cunningham's Mediterranean Triumph [Campaign title 397] Osprey Publishing 2023 ISBN 9781472857231
- Operation Pedestal 1942: The Battle for Malta's Lifeline [Campaign title 394] Osprey Publishing 2023 ISBN 9781472855640
- German High Seas Fleet 1914-18: The Kaiser's challenge to the Royal Navy [Fleet title 2] Osprey Publishing 2023 ISBN 9781472856470
- British Frigates and Escort Destroyers 1939-45 [New Vanguard title 319] Osprey Publishing 2023 ISBN 9781472858122
- British Aircraft Carriers 1945-2010 [New Vanguard Title 317] Osprey Publishing 2023 ISBN 9781472856876
- Naval Battle of Crete 1941: The Royal Navy at Breaking Point [Campaign title 388] ISBN 9781472854049
- British/Commonwealth Cruiser vs Italian Cruiser 1940-43 [Duel title 123] Osprey Publishing 2022 ISBN 9781472849687
- Barents Sea 1942: The Battle for Russia's Arctic Lifeline [Campaign title 376] Osprey Publishing 2022 ISBN 9781472848451
- Warships in the Baltic Campaigns 1918-20 [New Vanguard title 305] Osprey Publishing 2022 ISBN 9781472851666
- British Gunboats of Victoria's Empire [New Vanguard title 304] Osprey Publishing 2022 ISBN 9781472851581
- Warships in the Spanish Civil War [New Vanguard title 300] Osprey Publishing 2021 ISBN 9781472848673.
- Big Guns in the Atlantic: Germany's battleships and cruisers raid the convoys, 1939-41 [Raid title 55] Osprey Publishing 2021 ISBN 9781472845979.
- Sinking Force Z 1941: The day the Imperial Japanese Navy killed the battleship [Air Campaign title 20] Osprey Publishing 2021 ISBN 9781472846600.
- North Cape 1943: The Sinking of the Scharnhorst [Campaign title 356] Osprey Publishing 2020 ISBN 9781472842114.
- British Battleship v German Battleship 1941-43 [Duel title 107] Osprey Publishing 2020 ISBN 9781472841193.
- British Battleships 1890-1905 [New Vanguard title 290] Osprey Publishing 2020 ISBN 9781472844682.
- American Privateers of the Revolutionary War [New Vanguard title 279] Osprey Publishing 2019 ISBN 9781472836342.
- British Escort Carriers, 1941-45 [New Vanguard title 274] Osprey Publishing 2019 ISBN 9781472836250.
- Tirpitz in Norway: X-craft midget submarines raid the fjords, Operation Source 1943 [Raid title 51] Osprey Publishing 2019 ISBN 9781472835857.
- European Ironclads 1860-75 [New Vanguard title 269] Osprey Publishing 2019 ISBN 9781472826763.
- British Ironclads 1860-75 [New Vanguard title 262] Osprey Publishing 2018 ISBN 9781472826893.
- Sink the Tirpitz, 1942-44 [Air Campaign title 7] Osprey Publishing 2018 ISBN 9781472831590.
- British Destroyers 1939-45 (2): Wartime-built classes [New Vanguard title 253] Osprey Publishing 2017 ISBN 9781472825803.
- British Destroyers 1939-45 (1): Pre-war classes [New Vanguard title 246] Osprey Publishing, 2017 ISBN 9781472816368.
- River Plate 1939:The Sinking of the Graf Spee [Campaign title 171] Osprey Publishing 2016 ISBN 9781472817952.
- British Commando 1940-45 [Warrior title 181] Osprey Publishing 2016 ISBN 9781472814821.
- The Barbary Pirates 15th-17th Centuries [Elite title 213] Osprey Publishing 2016 ISBN 9781472815439.
- Nile River Gunboats 1882-1918 [New Vanguard title 239] Osprey Publishing 2016 ISBN 9781472814760.
- U-47 in Scapa Flow: The Sinking of the Royal Oak, 1939 [Raid title 33] Osprey Publishing 2015 ISBN 9781472808905.
- Taranto 1940: The Fleet Air Arm's precursor to Pearl Harbor [Campaign title 288] Osprey Publishing 2015 ISBN 9781472808967.
- Commonwealth Cruisers 1939-45 [New Vanguard title 226] Osprey Publishing 2015 ISBN 9781472805010.
- Byzantine warship vs Arab warship, 7th - 11th centuries [Duel title 64] Osprey Publishing 2015 ISBN 9781472807571.
- Gunboats of World War 1 [New Vanguard title 221] Osprey Publishing 2015 ISBN 9781472804983.
- Salerno 1943: The Allies invade southern Italy [Campaign title 257] Osprey Publishing 2015 ISBN 9781780962498.
- British Battleships 1914-18 (2): The Super-Dreadnoughts [New Vanguard title 204] Osprey Publishing 2013 ISBN 9781780961705.
- British Battleships, 1914-18 (1): The Early Dreadnoughts [New Vanguard title 200] Osprey Publishing 2013 ISBN 9781780961675.
- Blackbeard's Last Fight: Pirate Hunting in North Carolina 1718 [Raid title 37] Osprey Publishing 2013 ISBN 9781780961958.
- British Light Cruisers 1939-45 [New Vanguard title 194] Osprey Publishing 2012 ISBN 9781849086844.
- British Heavy Cruisers 1939-45 [New Vanguard title 190] Osprey Publishing 2012 ISBN 9781849086868.
- The Great Expedition: Sir Francis Drake on the Spanish Main 1585-86 [Raid title 11] Osprey Publishing 2011 'ISBN 9781849082457.
- Warships of the Anglo-Dutch Wars [New Vanguard title 183] Osprey Publishing 2011 ISBN 9781849084109.
- Nelson [Command title 14] Osprey Publishing 2011 ISBN 9781849084956.
- The Bismarck 1941: Hunting Germany's greatest battleship [Campaign title 232] Osprey Publishing 2011 ISBN 9781849083836.
- Yangtze River Gunboats 1900-49 45 [New Vanguard title 181] Osprey Publishing 2011 ISBN 9781849084086.
- Pirate: The Golden Age [Warrior title 158] Osprey Publishing 2011 with Dave Rickman ISBN 9781849084970.
- British Aircraft Carriers 1939-45 [New Vanguard title 168] Osprey Publishing 2010 ISBN 9781849080798.
- Strongholds of the Picts: The Forts of Dark Age Scotland [Fortress title 85] Osprey Publishing 2010 ISBN 9781846036866.
- Marlborough [Command title 10] Osprey Publishing 2010 ISBN 9781849083614.
- British Motor Gunboat 1939-45 [New Vanguard title 166] Osprey Publishing 2009 ISBN 9781849080774.
- Scapa Flow: The defences of Britain's great fleet anchorage, 1914-45 [Fortress title 85] Osprey Publishing 2009 ISBN 9781846033667.
- British Battleships 1939-45 (2): Nelson and King George V Classes [New Vanguard title 160] Osprey Publishing 2009 ISBN 9781846033896.
- British Battleships 1939-45 (1): Queen Elizabeth and Royal Sovereign Classes [New Vanguard title 154] Osprey Publishing 2009 ISBN 9781846033889.
- British Forts in the Age of Arthur [Fortress title 80] Osprey Publishing 2008 ISBN 9781846033629.
- Tudor Warships (2): Elizabeth I's Navy [New Vanguard title 149] Osprey Publishing 2008 ISBN 9781846032523.
- Tudor Warships (1): Henry VIII's Navy [New Vanguard title 142] Osprey Publishing 2008 ISBN 9781846032516.
- The Forts of Celtic Britain [Fortress title 50] Osprey Publishing 2006 ISBN 9781846030642.
- Confederate Submarines and Torpedo Vessels 1861-65 [New Vanguard title 103] Osprey Publishing 2004 ISBN 9781841767208.
- Spanish Galleon 1530-1690 [New Vanguard title 94] Osprey Publishing 2004 ISBN 9781841766379.
- Seven Days Battles 1862: Lee's Defense of Richmond [Campaign title 133] Osprey Publishing 2004 ISBN 9781841766829.
- Confederate Blockade Runner 1861-65 45 [New Vanguard title 90] Osprey Publishing 2004 ISBN 9781841766362.
- British Battlecruisers 1939-45 [New Vanguard title 88] Osprey Publishing 2003 ISBN 9781841766331.
- British Motor Torpedo Boat 1939-45 [New Vanguard title 74] Osprey Publishing 2003 ISBN 9781841765006.
- Fair Oaks 1862: McClellan's Peninsula Campaign [Campaign title 124] Osprey Publishing 2003 ISBN 1841766801.
- The Pirate Ship 1660-1730 [New Vanguard title 70] Osprey Publishing 2003 ISBN 9781841764979.
- Lepanto 1571: The greatest naval battle of the Renaissance [Campaign title 114] Osprey Publishing 2003 ISBN 9781841764092.
- Confederate Raider 1861-65 [New Vanguard title 64] Osprey Publishing 2002 ISBN 9781841764962.
- American Civil War Fortifications (1): Coastal brick and stone forts [Fortress title 14] Osprey Publishing 2003 ISBN 9781841764429.
- Renaissance War Galley 1470-1590 [New Vanguard title 62] Osprey Publishing 2002 ISBN 9781841764436.
- Union River Ironclad 1861-65 [New Vanguard title 56] Osprey Publishing 2002 ISBN 9781841764443.
- Mississippi River Gunboat 1861-65 [New Vanguard title 49] Osprey Publishing 2002 ISBN 9781841764139.
- Guilford Courthouse 1781: Lord Cornwallis's ruinous victory [Campaign title 109] Osprey Publishing 2002 ISBN 9781841764115.
- Union Monitor 1861-65 [New Vanguard title 45] Osprey Publishing 2002 ISBN 9781841763064.
- Hampton Roads 1862: First clash of the Ironclads [Campaign title 103] Osprey Publishing 2002 ISBN 9781841764108.
- British Napoleonic Ship-of-the-Line [New Vanguard title 42] Osprey Publishing 2001 ISBN 9781841763088.
- Privateers and Pirates 1730-1830 [Elite title 74] Osprey Publishing 2001 ISBN 1841760161.
- Confederate Ironclad 1861-65 [New Vanguard title 41] Osprey Publishing 2001 ISBN 9781841763071.
- The Armada Campaign 1588: The Great Enterprise against England [Campaign title 86] Osprey Publishing 2001 ISBN 9781841761923.
- Elizabethan Sea Dogs, 1560-1605 [Elite title 70] Osprey Publishing 2000 ISBN 9781841760155.
- Buccaneers 1620-1700 [Elite title 69] Osprey Publishing 2000 ISBN 9781855329126.
- San Juan Hill 1898: America's emergence as a world power [Campaign title 57] Osprey Publishing 1998 ISBN 1855327015.
- Pirates 1660-1730 [Elite title 67] Osprey Publishing 1998 ISBN 9781855327061.
- Russian Army of the Seven Years War (2) [Men-at-Arms title 298] Osprey Publishing 1996 ISBN 9781855325876.
- Russian Army of the Seven Years War (1) [Men-at-Arms title 297] Osprey Publishing 1996 ISBN 1855325853.
- Pavia 1525: The climax of the Italian Wars [Campaign title 44] Osprey Publishing 1996 ISBN 1855325047.
- Poltava 1709: Russia Comes of Age [Campaign title 34] Osprey Publishing 1994 ISBN 1855324164.
- Peter the Great's Army (2): Cavalry [Men-at-Arms title 264] Osprey Publishing 1993 ISBN 1855323486.
- Peter the Great's Army (1): Infantry [Men-at-Arms title 260] Osprey Publishing 1993 ISBN 185532315X.
