= COMEC =

COMEC may refer to:

- CSSC Offshore & Marine Engineering (Group) Company Limited, COMEC, is the largest modern integrated shipbuilding enterprise based in Southern China
- Council of Military Education Committees of the Universities of the United Kingdom, COMEC, represents university interests in policy development in officer training
