= The Lifeboat Inn, Thornham =

Pub in Thornham, Norfolk, England

The Lifeboat Inn
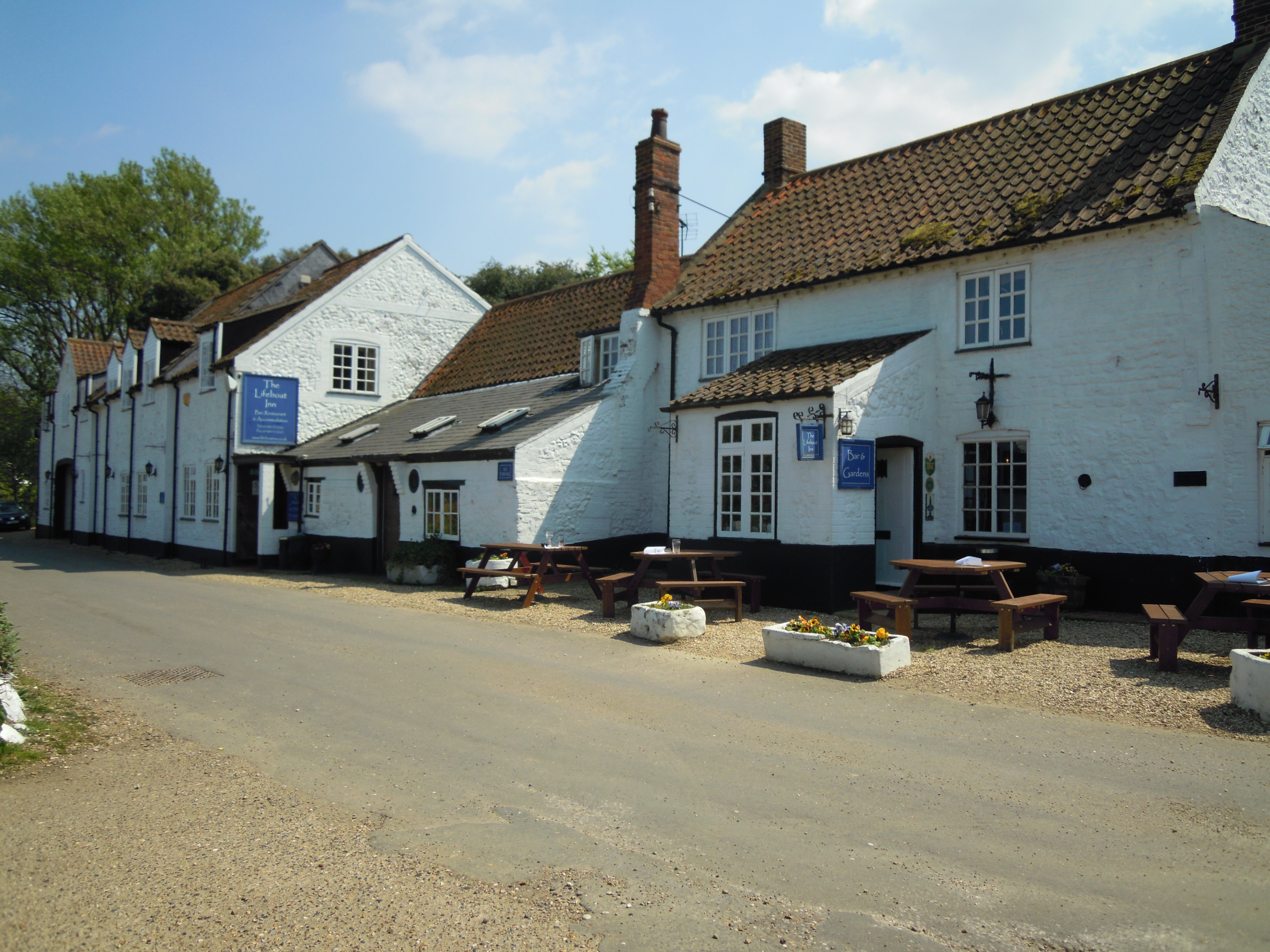

- Location within Norfolk

General information
- Location: Ship Lane, Thornham, Norfolk, England
- Coordinates: 52°57′40″N 0°34′24″E

Other information
- Number of rooms: 22

The Lifeboat Inn is a public house and inn in Ship Lane, Thornham, Norfolk, England. It lies near the wooded grounds of Thornham Manor. The white-painted pub was originally built in the 16th century and was a simple cottage with two outhouses, and was sometimes used in the 18th century as a convenient smugglers' store. Contrary to modern popular myth, the premises were not licensed until 1832, when one of the ground floor rooms was set aside for the consumption of home-brewed beer. The beer house was known as Pointers, after the first licensee Francis Pointer. In 1869, forebears of the Thornham Sadler family, John and Nellie Sadler became the landlord and lady, it was named the Lifeboat presumably in commemoration of the first RNLI Hunstanton lifeboat launched two years previously.

On 31 December 1782 the militia of the local smugglers baron, Thomas Franklyn with a band of 80 smugglers lured a small force of dragoons led by the Excise Superintendent, Robert Bliss into a trap as they attempted to search the cottage and outbuildings. The property was then owned by William Southgate and the bloody encounter left many villagers wounded and incapacitated and had far-reaching consequences in the local area.

Today the Inn consists of two main buildings; the main inn having 14 double rooms.
