= UK Maritime Component Command =

- Country: United Kingdom
- Branch: Royal Navy
- Size: Command
- Garrison/HQ: HMS Jufair

Commanders
- Current commander: Commodore Phil Dennis:

UK Maritime Component Command (UKMCC) is a Royal Navy Command located at HMS Jufair in Bahrain.

== Commander, United Kingdom Maritime Component Command ==
Post holders included:

- Commodore Paul H. Robinson: September 2003 – 2005
- Commodore Simon T. Williams: 2005-October 2006
- Commodore Keith Winstanley: October 2006-October 2008
- Commodore Timothy M. Lowe: October 2008-May 2010
- Commodore Timothy P. Fraser: May 2010-November 2011
- Commodore Simon J. Ancona: November 2011-September 2013
- Commodore Keith E. Blount: September 2013-March 2015
- Commodore William J. Warrender: March 2015-June 2017
- Commodore Steven Dainton: June 2017 – 2019
- Commodore Dean A. Bassett: 2019–February 2021
- Commodore Edward G. Ahlgren: February 2021–April 2022
- Commodore Adrian Fryer: April 2022 - Jan 2023
- Commodore Philip Dennis: January 2023 - Current

== See also ==
- Senior Naval Officer, Persian Gulf
