= HMS Archer (P264) =

Archer-class patrol vessel of the Royal Navy

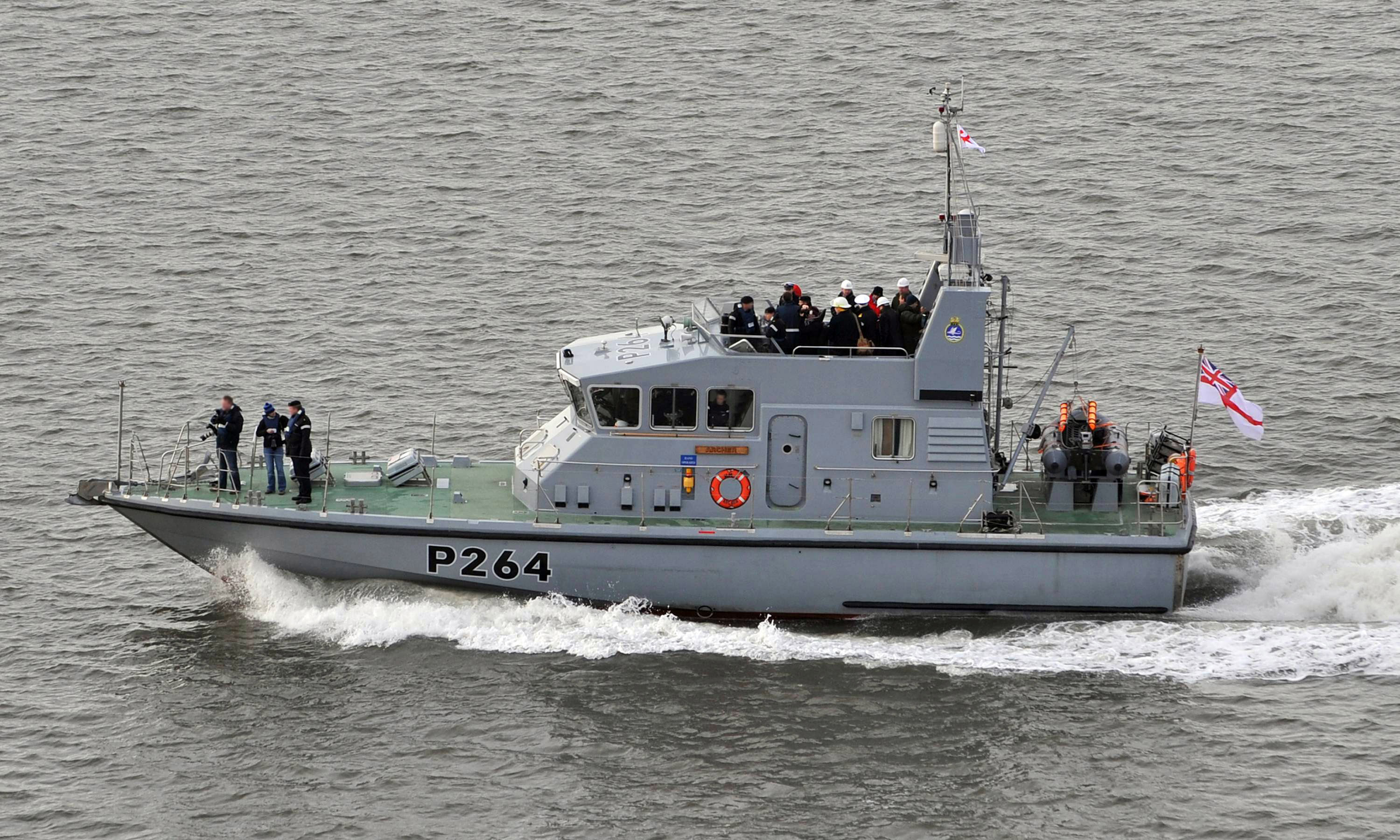
- HMS Archer (P264)

History

United Kingdom
- Name: HMS Archer
- Builder: Watercraft Marine
- Launched: 25 June 1985
- Home port: HMS Calliope
- Identification: MMSI number: 232002840; Callsign: GAAQ; Pennant number: P264
- Motto: "The Original and Best"
- Status: In active service

General characteristics
- Class & type: Archer-class patrol vessel
- Displacement: 54 tonnes
- Length: 19.9 m (65 ft)
- Beam: 5.8 m (19 ft)
- Draught: 1.9 m (6.2 ft)
- Propulsion: 2 shafts, Cat C18 ACERT diesels
- Speed: 20 knots (37 km/h); 45 knots (83 km/h) (Hull design, but limited due to engine fitted)
- Range: 550 nmi (1,020 km)
- Complement: 16 (training) (Note: 5 ship's company, 1 training officer, 10 URNU students.); 5 (operational)
- Sensors & processing systems: Decca 1216 navigation radar
- Armament: 1 × Oerlikon 20 mm cannon on fo'c'sle ("for but not with"); 3 × General purpose machine guns (Note: When operational and not in URNU role.)

HMS Archer is the lead ship of the Archer class. As the lead ship she was one of several of her class to be completed in 1985 by Watercraft Marine, the original shipbuilders — most of the remaining vessels were completed or built by Vosper Thornycroft. In 2015, she was one of the first of her class to receive an upgrade.

== Operational history ==
=== Early service ===
The Archer class were built as Royal Naval Reserve (RNR) training vessels, but after limited use they were transferred to URNU service.

Between 1989 and 1991, just before Archer's handover to the URNU, she was commanded by (then) Lieutenant Tim Fraser, who subsequently achieved the rank of Admiral, and is the former Vice-Chief of the Defence Staff.

=== URNU service ===
Archer became the training ship of the Aberdeen URNU in 1991, succeeding Chaser. The role of a training ship within an URNU is to provide opportunities for students to receive practical training and gain experience afloat. Archer's programme is generally divided into two durations of training – a weekend or the longer deployments that take place during the university Easter and summer holidays.

Deployments in the Easter and summer venture further afield, Archer has visited ports from the Western Isles and east coast of Britain to Ireland, the Netherlands, Norway and the Baltic. These longer deployments are often undertaken in company with other ships such as Example and Explorer.

Between 1991 and 1993 she was commanded by (then) Lieutenant John Clink who subsequently achieved flag rank.

The Aberdeen URNU operated from 1967 until 2012 before being moved to Edinburgh. In the summer of 2012, the ship was moved to Rosyth Dockyard to serve with URNU East Scotland and to increase the presence of the RN in Edinburgh.

In June 2017, Archer, in company with HM Ships Smiter, Ranger and Exploit, deployed to the Baltic to take part in the NATO BALTOPS exercise, the first time that Royal Navy P2000s have been involved in such an exercise.

These deployments have continued with ARCR reaching the Eastern Baltic and the Barents Sea regularly over the following 8 years shifting more to the developing Coastal Warfare Concept, and accommodating a reduced number of URNU students, often running with RN regulars under training in their place. The small nature of the platforms provides an enhanced 1 on 1 training opportunity for the SFT(X) IWOs.

=== Crew composition ===
Archer is permanently crewed by five RN personnel, and is captained by a lieutenant. Chief petty officer fills the role of Executive Officer (XO) and Marine Engineering Officer (MEO). The Deputy Marine Engineering Officer (DMEO) and Navigators Yeoman (NY) are junior rates of the appropriate service branches. With additionals embarked (up to a maximum of 15), the ship regularly operates with a crew of 10.

== Affiliates ==
- Scarborough Yacht Club
- HMS Vanguard
- Stonehaven SCC TS Carron
