= William Warrender =

Royal Navy Rear Admiral (born 1968)

Rear Admiral William Warrender CBE
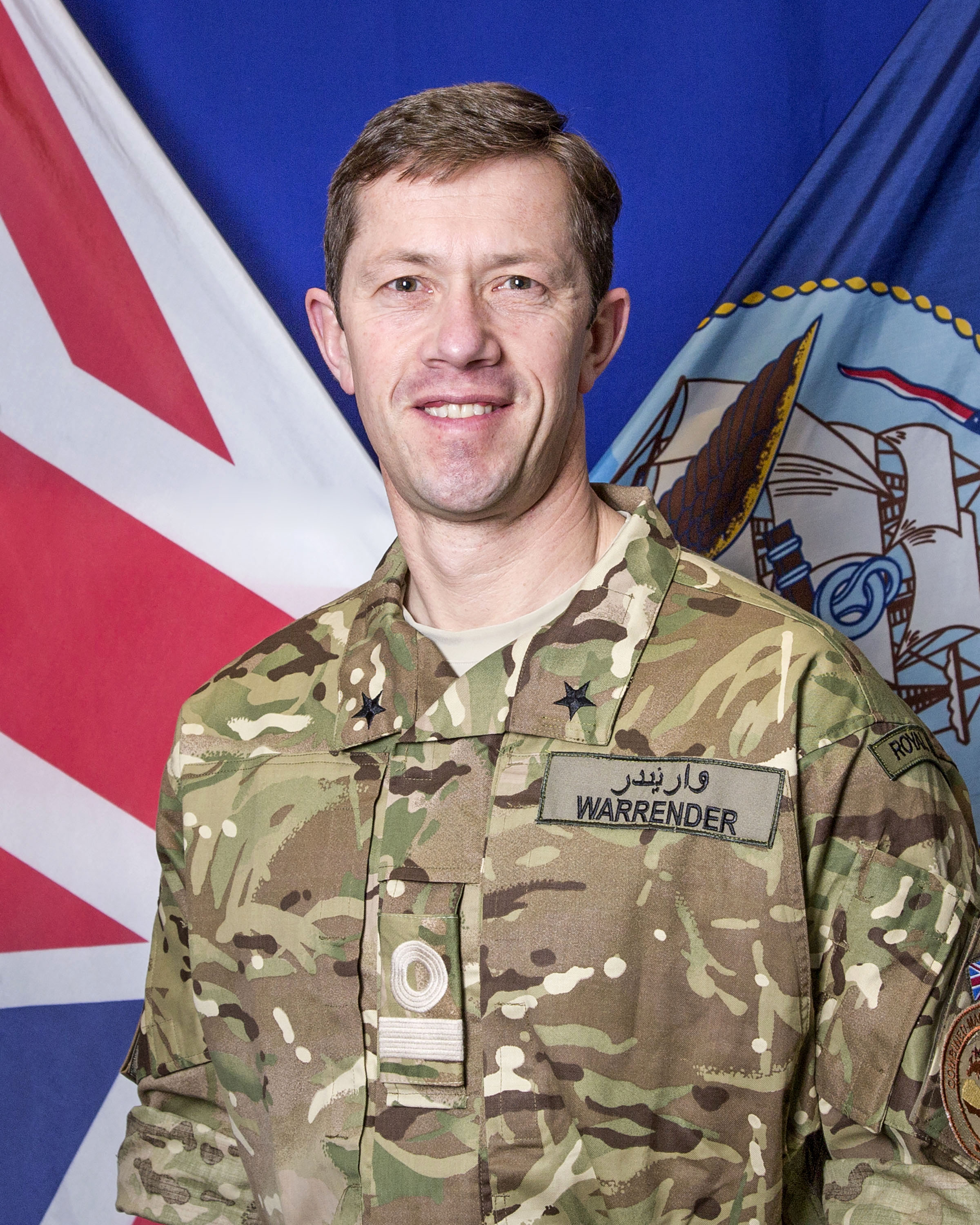
- Commodore William Warrender in 2015
- Born: 28 November 1968 (age 57); Firozpur, India
- Military career
- Allegiance: United Kingdom
- Branch: Royal Navy
- Service years: 1980s - 2020
- Rank: Rear Admiral
- Commands: HMS Chiddingfold; HMS Cattistock; HMS Argyll; HMS Montrose; HMS Dauntless
- Awards: Commander of the Order of the British Empire

Rear Admiral William Jonathan Warrender CBE (born 28 November 1968) is a former Royal Navy officer who served as Flag Officer Sea Training.

== Education ==
He was educated at the Royal Naval Engineering College and completed an MA in Defence Studies from King's College London.

== Naval career ==
Warrender joined the Royal Navy in the late 1980s. He served as commanding officer of the minesweeper HMS Chiddingfold, the minesweeper HMS Cattistock, the frigate HMS Argyll and the frigate HMS Montrose before taking command of the destroyer HMS Dauntless in April 2011. He went on to become Assistant Head of UK Military Operations at the Ministry of Defence in January 2013, Commander, United Kingdom Maritime Component, Persian Gulf in March 2015. He became Flag Officer Sea Training in June 2018. Warrender retired from the Royal Navy on 28 July 2020.

On 11 May 2018, he was appointed Commander of the Order of the British Empire (CBE) "in recognition of gallant and distinguished services in the field during the period 1 April 2017 to 30 September 2017".

== Later life ==
On 19 February 2020 it was announced that he had been appointed CEO of South Western Ambulance Service NHS Foundation Trust with effect from June 2020. In September 2023 it was announced that he had resigned his position at South Western Ambulance Service.

Military offices
Preceded by John Clink	Flag Officer Sea Training; 2018– 2020	Succeeded by Philip Hally; As Assistant Chief of the Naval Staff (People Transformation)
