= John Clink =

Royal Navy Rear Admiral (born 1964)

Rear Admiral John Clink CBE
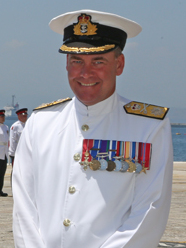
- John Clink in 2013
- Born: 18 February 1964 (age 62)
- Military career
- Allegiance: United Kingdom
- Branch: Royal Navy
- Rank: Rear Admiral
- Commands: Scotland, Northern England and Northern Ireland; British Forces Gibraltar; HMS Ark Royal; HMS Kent; HMS Archer; Aberdeen Universities' Royal Naval Unit
- Conflicts: Iraq War; War in Afghanistan
- Awards: Commander of the Order of the British Empire; Bronze Star Medal (United States)

Rear Admiral John Robert Hamilton Clink, CBE (born 18 February 1964) is a former Royal Navy officer who retired from the Royal Navy in 2018.

== Early life and education ==
Clink was born on 18 February 1964. He was educated at Cheltenham Grammar School, then an all-boys state grammar school. He studied international security and strategy at King's College London, graduating with a Master of Arts (MA) degree in 2012.

== Naval career ==
He became commanding officer of the Aberdeen University Royal Naval Unit and its patrol boat HMS Archer in 1991, commanding officer of the frigate HMS Kent in 1998 and commanding officer of HMS Ark Royal in July 2008 before becoming Deputy Commander UK Maritime Forces in June 2011. In the latter role he commanded Combined Task Force 150, a multinational naval task force working under a 25 nation coalition of Combined Maritime Forces based in Bahrain. He went on to be Commander British Forces Gibraltar in November 2012, Flag Officer Scotland, Northern England, Northern Ireland in the rank of rear admiral in August 2014 and Flag Officer Sea Training in 2015.

Clink was appointed Officer of the Order of the British Empire (OBE) in 2002 and Commander of the Order of the British Empire (CBE) in the 2017 Birthday Honours.

Military offices
Preceded by Christopher Hockley	Flag Officer Scotland, Northern England and Northern Ireland; 2014–2015	Succeeded by John Weale
Preceded by Ben Key	Flag Officer Sea Training; 2015–2018	Succeeded by William Warrender
