= Hepburn House =

Drill hall in Edinburgh, Scotland

- Edinburgh, Scotland
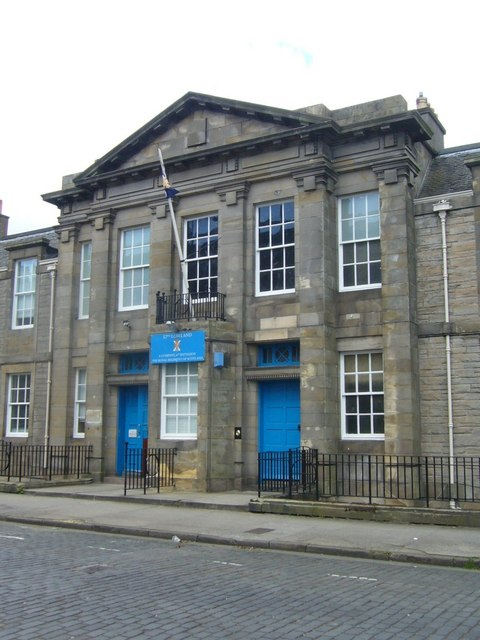
- Hepburn House

Site information
- Type: Army Reserve Centre
- Owner: British Army
- Operator: The Royal Regiment of Scotland

Location
- Location in Edinburgh
- Coordinates: 55.96304°N 3.19201°W

Site history
- Built: 1912
- Built for: War Office
- Architect: Thomas Duncan Rhind
- In use: 1912 – Present

Garrison information
- Occupants: A (Royal Scots Borderers) Company, 52nd Lowland, 6th Battalion The Royal Regiment of Scotland; Lowland Band of the Royal Regiment of Scotland; University Royal Naval Unit East Scotland

Hepburn House, also known as East Claremont Street Drill Hall, is a military installation in Edinburgh.

== History ==
The building was designed by Thomas Duncan Rhind in the free Renaissance style as the headquarters of the 9th (Highlanders) Battalion the Royal Scots and completed in 1912. The battalion was mobilised at the drill hall in August 1914 before being deployed to Western Front.

The battalion amalgamated with the 7th Battalion to become the 7th/9th (Highlanders) Battalion, The Royal Scots, with its headquarters at the Dalmeny Street drill hall but with elements at the East Claremont Street drill hall, in 1922. The 7th/9th Battalion and the 8th Battalion amalgamated to form the 8th/9th Battalion, still at the Dalmeny Street drill hall but with representation at the East Claremont Street drill hall, in 1961. The 8th/9th Battalion was reduced to company size as A (Royal Scots) Company, the 52nd Lowland Volunteers in 1967 and this unit in turn evolved to become HQ (Royal Scots) Company, Lowland Volunteers in 1995.

After the Dalmeny Street drill hall was decommissioned in the late 1990s, this unit, in its new designation as A (Royal Scots) Company, 52nd Lowland Regiment, became based at the East Claremont Street drill hall in 1999. This unit evolved further to become A (Royal Scots Borderers) Company, 52nd Lowland, 6th Battalion The Royal Regiment of Scotland, still based at the East Claremont Street drill hall, in 2006. The building, which is known as Hepburn House after Sir John Hepburn, founder of the Royal Scots, remains an active Army Reserve Centre.
