= Thornham, Norfolk =

Village in Norfolk, England

Coordinates: 52.95997°N 0.57864°E

Thornham
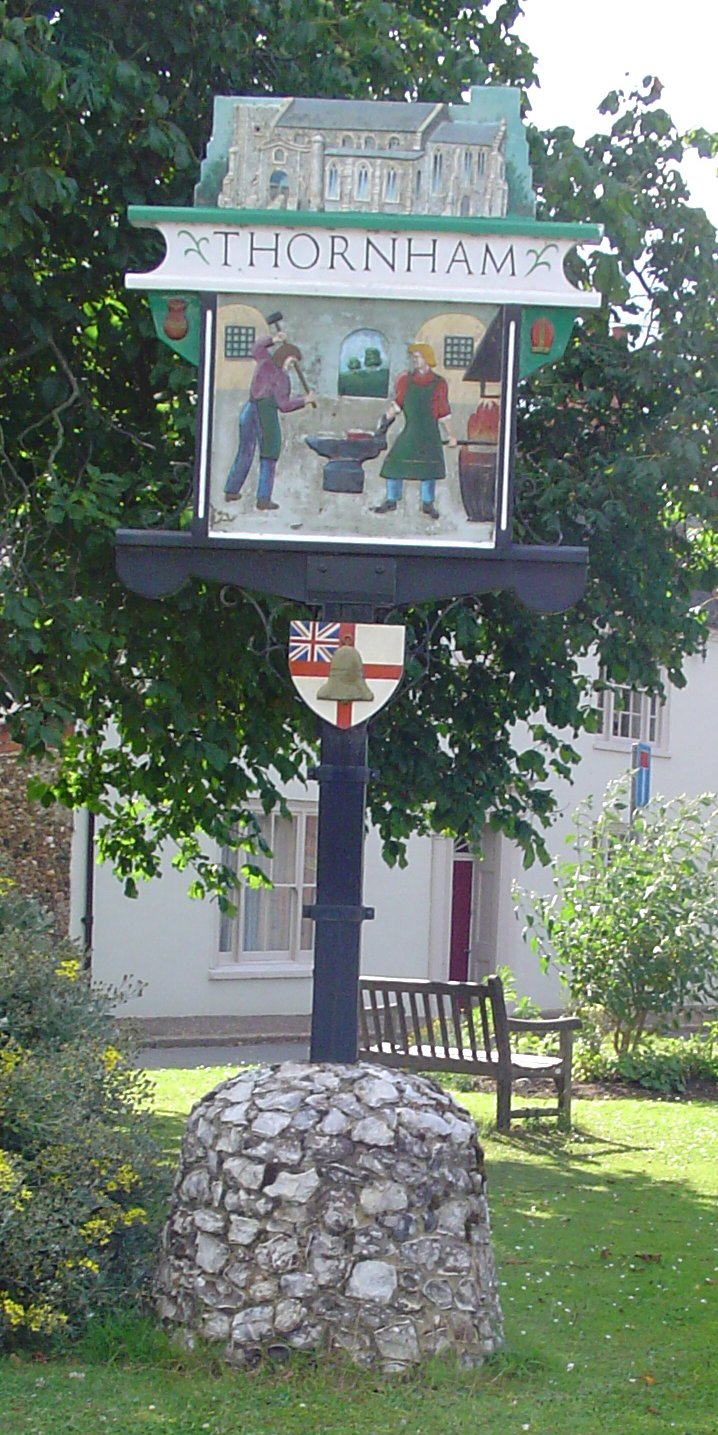
- Village sign in Thornham

- Location within Norfolk
- Area: 13.47 km^{2} (5.20 sq mi)
- Population: 496 (2011)
  - Density: 37/km^{2} (96/sq mi)
- OS grid reference: TF 733 434
- Civil parish: Thornham, Norfolk
- District: King's Lynn and West Norfolk
- Shire county: Norfolk
- Region: East
- Country: England
- Sovereign state: United Kingdom
- Post town: HUNSTANTON
- Postcode district: PE36
- Police: Norfolk
- Fire: Norfolk
- Ambulance: East of England

Thornham Village in 2027

Thornham is a village and civil parish in the English county of Norfolk. It is situated on the north Norfolk coast some 7 kilometres (4.3 mi) north-east of the seaside resort of Hunstanton, 30 km (19 mi) north of the town of King's Lynn and 70 km (43 mi) north-west of the city of Norwich.

The village's name means 'Thorn-tree homestead/village'.

The civil parish has an area of 13.47 km^{2} (5.20 sq mi) and in the 2001 census had a population of 478 in 249 households, including Titchwell and increasing to 496 at the 2011 Census. For the purposes of local government, the parish falls within the district of King's Lynn and West Norfolk.

The Church of England parish church, dedicated to All Saints, is a Grade I listed building. HMS Thornham, a Ham class minesweeper, was named after the village. The ship's bell hangs in All Saints' Church.

== See also ==
- The Lifeboat Inn, Thornham
- Anna's Walk
