= HMS Thornham =

Minesweeper of the Royal Navy

History

United Kingdom
- Name: HMS Thornham
- Namesake: Thornham
- Builder: Jason Taylor
- Launched: 18 March 1957
- Completed: 20 June 1958
- Fate: Broken up 1985

General characteristics
- Class & type: Ham-class minesweeper
- Notes: Pennant number: M2793

HMS Thornham was one of 93 ships of the Ham-class of inshore minesweepers.

Their names were all chosen from villages ending in -ham. The minesweeper was named after Thornham in Norfolk.

She was converted in 1967 at Rosyth Dockyard for use by the Aberdeen Universities' Royal Naval Unit.

In 1978, HMS Thornham became the first foreign warship to visit the Danish city of Roskilde since the Viking times, when the five Skuldelev ships were sunk in the waterway of Peberrenden, 20 km north of the city.

HMS Thornham gave its ship's bell to Thornham Church in 1969, and it is rung to signal the two minutes' silence on Remembrance Sunday.
