= King's crown =

King's crown is a common name for several plants and may refer to:

- Calotropis procera
- Dicliptera squarrosa
- Justicia carnea
- Rhodiola integrifolia
- Rhodiola rosea
