= Tim Fraser =

Royal Navy Admiral

Admiral Sir Tim Fraser KCB ADC
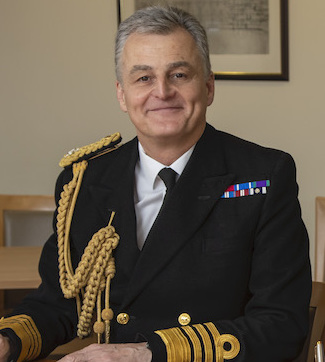
- Admiral Fraser in 2020
- Military career
- Allegiance: United Kingdom
- Branch: Royal Navy
- Service years: 1982–2022
- Rank: Admiral
- Service number: C030314S
- Commands: Vice-Chief of the Defence Staff (2019–22); Chief of Joint Operations (2017–19); UK Maritime Component, Bahrain (2010-11); HMS Illustrious (2006–07); 5th Destroyer Squadron (2001–03); HMS Cardiff (2001–03); HMS Gloucester (1997–98); HMS Archer (1989–91)
- Awards: Knight Commander of the Order of the Bath

Admiral Sir Timothy Peter Fraser, KCB, ADC is a retired senior Royal Navy officer who served as Vice-Chief of the Defence Staff from May 2019 to August 2022.

== Early life ==
Fraser was educated at Lord Williams's School, a comprehensive school in Thame, Oxfordshire.

== Naval career ==
Fraser joined the Royal Navy in 1982 and was commissioned a sub-lieutenant on 1 January 1984. He captained the patrol craft HMS Archer from 1989 to 1991, and served as captain of the destroyer HMS Gloucester from 1997 to 1998 and of the destroyer HMS Cardiff from 2001 to 2003. In the latter he was also commander of the 5th Destroyer Squadron. Fraser was appointed captain of the aircraft carrier HMS Illustrious in 2006, and Director of Naval Plans and resources at the Ministry of Defence in 2007. He went on to be Commander, UK Maritime Component, Bahrain in 2010.

Promoted to rear admiral on 16 January 2012, Fraser became Senior British Advisor, United States Central Command in 2012, and Assistant Chief of Defence Staff (Capability & Force Design) at the Ministry of Defence in 2014. He was appointed Companion of the Order of the Bath (CB) in the 2015 Birthday Honours. Promoted to vice admiral on 26 June 2017, Fraser was appointed Chief of Joint Operations that month. He was promoted to admiral and succeeded General Sir Gordon Messenger as Vice-Chief of the Defence Staff in May 2019.

Fraser was appointed Knight Commander of the Order of the Bath (KCB) in the 2020 Birthday Honours.

Fraser stepped down in August 2022 when General Gwyn Jenkins succeeded him as Vice-Chief of the Defence Staff. He retired from the navy on 1 December 2022.

Military offices
Preceded by Sir John Lorimer	Chief of Joint Operations; 2017–2019	Succeeded by Ben Key
Preceded by Sir Gordon Messenger	Vice-Chief of the Defence Staff; 2019–2022	Succeeded by Gwyn Jenkins
