= Council of Military Education Committees of the Universities of the United Kingdom =

- Formation: 1919
- Members: 19 University Military Education Committees
- President: General Sir Peter Wall
- Key people: Mr. James Castle (Chairman); Mr. Jason Norris (Secretary); Prof. Patton Taylor (Treasurer)
- Website: https://www.comec.org.uk/

The Council of Military Education Committees of the Universities of the United Kingdom (COMEC) represents the interests of military education committees in negotiations with the Ministry of Defence and the armed morces over policy development in officer training, the University Service Units and the Reserve Forces. COMEC organizes an annual conference, publishes occasional papers and awards a Prize to the Officer Cadet who demonstrates outstanding achievement in leadership through military expertise, public service commitment and Service Unit activities.

The COMEC Conspectus publicises to COMEC's strategic allies and others what COMEC does and for whom.

COMEC strategic alliances

== History ==
COMEC as such came into being in 1919, though its origins lie in the formation of the Officers Training Corps (OTC) in 1908.

Widespread myth surrounds the formation of the OTC, occasioned by a history of the Victorian Volunteers which suggested, in an appendix, that all university Volunteer units transferred to the OTC on 1 September 1908. In fact, only eight universities formed OTCs in that year, although others would soon follow.

Army Order 297 issued on 10 November, officially recognised the first OTC Contingents as Edinburgh with Infantry, Artillery and Medical Units, Birmingham, Cambridge, Durham, Manchester, Oxford and Wales with Infantry Units, and newly- formed Belfast. Edinburgh’s Medical Unit had attended annual camp in August wearing OTC insignia and this gives rise to their optimistic claim to have been the founding OTC Contingent.

The role of the OTC was primarily to prepare undergraduates for commissioned service and to maintain a supply of well-educated officers to the Territorial Force. No one could have foreseen how vital this was to become when, in the early months of WW1, OTCs bore the brunt of training the large number of additional officers urgently required for the New Army.

From 1908, it was a statutory requirement that a host university had a 'Military Education Committee' (MEC - the usual but not universal title) comprising a mix of university and service representatives to oversee the operation of the OTC with particular regard to the balance between cadets' military and academic activities. Most universities that had Volunteer Companies or Batteries, already had a 'Military Committee' for that very purpose and merely had to adopt the new title.

During World War I, several aspects of the mobilisation, notably the treatment of OTC officers and cadets who enlisted for active service, had caused widespread dissatisfaction within OTCs: officers were treated as substantive 2nd Lieutenants regardless of their Territorial Force rank and cadets arriving at an Officer Cadet Battalion were treated as fresh recruits even if they held Certificate B.

To address this, and other issues, a meeting was held in Durham on 22–23 September 1919, attended by twenty-eight representatives from fifteen MECs and a representative from the War Office. At this meeting, it was resolved to form a ‘Central Organization of Military Education Committees’. COMEC was born.

Its functions were to be:

- To assist in the co-ordination of the work of the Universities and University Colleges in the study of National Defence.
- To secure for Military Science its due place among University studies and to promote the systematic instruction and training of candidates for commissions and, so far as may be desired by the Army Council and other authorities concerned, of Officers in the National Forces.
- For these purposes the Central Organization shall assist in the co-operation of the Universities and University Colleges with the Departments of State which administer the National Forces.

In broad terms, COMEC continued to function as envisaged in 1919 although its role expanded as University Air Squadrons were formed at Cambridge and Oxford in 1925 and many other universities in 1941 and later. University Royal Navy Units also came into being, starting with Aberdeen in 1967.

A significant change came in 1970 when the name was changed to ‘Council of Military Education Committees of the Universities of the United Kingdom’ in an effort to underline the fact that it was an advisory and co-ordinating body, rather than having an executive role.

By the end of the century, COMEC’s ‘Terms of Reference’ had evolved to:

- To co-ordinate and represent the views of MECs to the Ministry of Defence through the directorates for university service units of the Royal Navy, the Army and the Royal Air Force.
- To consider and deliberate upon matters of policy emanating from the directors of university service units and to advise the MOD DRFC and universities thereon.
- To assist in the co-ordination of the work of universities through their MECs and in particular to facilitate systematic instruction and training of candidates for commissions in the armed services as may be required by the MOD and to promote for these purposes the co-operation of the universities with the Ministry of Defence.
- To maintain liaison with the appropriate bodies concerned with Defence Studies and other relevant issues.

The role of COMEC continues in this vein to the present day.

== Members ==
=== President ===
2017 on General Sir Peter Wall GCB CBE DL, former Chief of the General Staff

2011 - 2017 General Sir Mike Jackson GCB CBE DSO DL, former Chief of the General Staff

2006 - 2011 Sir Graeme Davies FRSE FREng, Vice-Chancellor of the University of London

1999 - 2006 Field Marshal The Lord Vincent of Coleshill GBE KCB DSO, former Chief of the Defence Staff

=== Military education committees (MECs) ===
The University Service Units have their origins in the Army reforms of Richard Haldane, Secretary of State for War, from 1905 to 1908. In the Territorial and Reserve Forces Act 1907, the universities were invited to establish Officers' Training Corps on the stipulation that they must have a committee responsible for military education.

Military education committee	Member universities
Aberdeen MEC	Aberdeen and Robert Gordon
Bristol MEC	Bristol, Bath and West of England
Cambridge MEC	Cambridge, East Anglia, Anglia Ruskin, Essex and Northampton
East Midlands Combined MEC	Nottingham, De Montfort, Derby, Leicester, Lincoln, Loughborough, Nottingham Trent and Northampton
City of Edinburgh Joint MEC	Edinburgh, Heriot-Watt, Edinburgh Napier and Queen Margaret
Exeter MEC	Exeter, Plymouth, Falmouth and Plymouth Marjon
Glasgow and Strathclyde MEC	Glasgow, Strathclyde, Glasgow Caledonian and West of Scotland
Leeds’ Military, Air Force and Naval Education Committee	Leeds, Leeds Beckett and Leeds Trinity
Liverpool MEC	Liverpool, Lancaster, Liverpool John Moores and Central Lancashire
London MEC	King's College, University College, Queen Mary, Royal Holloway, Imperial, Brunel, City, South Bank and Kent
Manchester and Salford MEC	Manchester, Manchester Metropolitan and Salford
Northumbrian MEC	Durham, Newcastle, Northumbria, Sunderland and Teesside
Oxford Delegacy for Military Instruction	Oxford, Oxford Brookes, Reading, Royal Agricultural and Gloucestershire
Queen's Belfast MEC	Queen's Belfast and Ulster
Sheffield MEC	Sheffield and Sheffield Hallam
Sussex MEC	Sussex and Brighton
Tayforth MEC	St. Andrews, Dundee and Abertay
MEC for Wales	Cardiff, Aberystwyth, Bangor, Swansea, Cardiff Metropolitan, South Wales, Wrexham Glyndwr, Trinity Saint David and Chester
West Midlands MEC	Birmingham, Aston and Warwick

=== University Service Units (USUs) ===
==== University Royal Naval Units (URNUs) ====
MECs facilitated the establishment during the Second World War of the University Naval Division, which vanished with the end of war, not to be resurrected for another quarter of a century as the Royal Naval Unit in 1967.

University Royal Naval Unit	Ship	Universities
URNU Birmingham	HMS Exploit	Birmingham, Aston, Warwick, Birmingham City, Coventry, Wolverhampton
URNU Bristol	HMS Dasher	Bristol, Bath, West of England
URNU Cambridge	HMS Trumpeter	Cambridge, East Anglia, Anglia Ruskin, Essex
URNU Devon	-	Exeter, Plymouth, St Mark & St John
URNU East Scotland	HMS Archer	Edinburgh, Heriot-Watt, Edinburgh Napier, Queen Margaret, St Andrews, Dundee, Abertay, Aberdeen, Robert Gordon, Perth, Stirling
URNU Glasgow	HMS Pursuer	Glasgow, Strathclyde, Glasgow Caledonian, West of Scotland
URNU Liverpool	HMS Charger	Liverpool, Lancaster
URNU London	HMS Puncher	King's College, University College, Queen Mary, Royal Holloway, Imperial, Brunel, City
URNU Manchester & Salford	HMS Biter	Manchester, Salford, Manchester Metropolitan
URNU Northumbrian	HMS Example	Newcastle, Durham, Northumbria, Sunderland
URNU Oxford	HMS Smiter	Oxford, Reading, Oxford Brookes
URNU Sussex	HMS Ranger	Sussex, Brighton
URNU Wales	HMS Express	Cardiff, Swansea, Cardiff Metropolitan, South Wales
URNU Yorkshire	HMS Explorer	Leeds, Sheffield, Hull, Bradford, York, Leeds Beckett, Sheffield Hallam

==== University Officers' Training Corps (UOTCs) ====
UOTCs were inaugurated from 1908 onwards.

University Officers' Training Corps	Universities
Aberdeen UOTC	Aberdeen, Robert Gordon
Birmingham UOTC	Birmingham, Aston, Keele, Warwick, Birmingham City, Newman Birmingham, University College Birmingham, Coventry, Harper Adams, Staffordshire, Wolverhampton, Worcester
Bristol UOTC	Bristol, Bath, West of England, Bath Spa
Cambridge UOTC	Cambridge, Essex, Anglia Ruskin, Bedford, Hertfordshire
East Midlands UOTC	Nottingham, Leicester, Loughborough, De Montfort, Derby, Lincoln, Northampton, Nottingham Trent
City of Edinburgh UOTC	Edinburgh, Heriot-Watt, Edinburgh Napier, Queen Margaret
Exeter UOTC	Exeter, Plymouth, Plymouth Marjon, Falmouth
Glasgow and Strathclyde UOTC	Glasgow, Strathclyde, Glasgow Caledonian, West of Scotland
Leeds UOTC	Leeds, Bradford, Hull, York, Leeds Beckett, Leeds Trinity, York St John
Liverpool UOTC	Liverpool, Lancaster, Central Lancashire, Chester, Cumbria, Edge Hill, Liverpool Hope, Liverpool John Moores
London UOTC	London, King's College, University College, Queen Mary, Royal Holloway, Brunel, City, Imperial, Essex, Kent, Surrey, Sussex, Bedfordshire, Buckinghamshire, Canterbury Christ Church, Hertfordshire, Kingston, London Metropolitan, Middlesex, South Bank, Westminster
Manchester and Salford UOTC	Manchester, Salford, Bolton, Manchester Metropolitan
Northumbrian UOTC	Durham, Newcastle, Northumbria, Sunderland, Teesside
Oxford UOTC	Oxford, Reading, Buckingham, Cranfield, Oxford Brookes, Royal Agricultural, Gloucestershire
Queen's UOTC	Queen's Belfast, Ulster
Sheffield UOTC	Sheffield, Sheffield Hallam, Huddersfield
Tayforth UOTC	St. Andrews, Dundee, Stirling, Abertay
Wales UOTC	Wales, Aberystwyth, Bangor, Cardiff, Swansea, Cardiff Metropolitan, South Wales, Trinity St David

==== University Air Squadrons (UASs) ====
University Air Squadrons were created at Cambridge and Oxford in 1925 and at London in 1935, but all were closed down with the outbreak of war in 1939. MECs sponsored in 1941 the inauguration of the national scheme for establishing Air Squadrons in Universities.

University Air Squadron	Universities
Birmingham UAS	Birmingham, Aston, Birmingham City, Coventry, Keele, Staffordshire, Harper Adams, Warwick, Wolverhampton, Worcester
Bristol UAS	Bristol, Bath, West of England, Exeter, Plymouth
Cambridge UAS	Cambridge, East Anglia, Essex, Anglia Ruskin
East Midlands UAS	Nottingham, Leicester, Loughborough, De Montfort, Lincoln, Nottingham Trent
East of Scotland UAS	Aberdeen, St. Andrews, Edinburgh, Dundee, Heriot-Watt, Abertay, Edinburgh Napier, Queen Margaret, Robert Gordon
Glasgow and Strathclyde UAS	Glasgow, Strathclyde, Glasgow Caledonian, West of Scotland, Stirling, Glasgow School of Art
Liverpool UAS	Liverpool, Lancaster, Bangor, Edge Hill, Central Lancashire, Liverpool John Moores
London UAS	London, Kings College, University College, Queen Mary, Royal Holloway, Imperial, Brunel, City, Kent, Hertfordshire
Manchester and Salford UAS	Manchester, Salford, Manchester Metropolitan
Northern Ireland UAS	Queen's Belfast, Ulster
Northumbrian UAS	Newcastle, Durham, Northumbria, Sunderland, Teesside
Oxford UAS	Oxford, Reading, Oxford Brookes
Wales UAS	Wales, Aberystwyth, Cardiff, Swansea, Cardiff Metropolitan, South Wales, Trinity St. David
Yorkshire UAS	Leeds, Bradford, Hull, Sheffield, York, Huddersfield, Leeds Beckett, Leeds Trinity, Sheffield Hallam, York St. John

=== Defence Technical Undergraduate Scheme (DTUS) ===
The Defence Technical Officer Engineering Entry Scheme (DTOEES) provides education and support to students preparing for a career as an engineer or technical officer in the Armed Forces or MOD Civil Service. Students attend Welbeck Defence Sixth Form College (DSFC) and, on completion of their A levels, go on to study for an engineering, technical, business or logistics degree at one of the DTUS partner universities. Defence has closed DTOEES, with the final cohort leaving the Defence Sixth Form College in 2021.

Defence Technical Undergraduate Scheme (DTUS) universities have separate partnership agreements with the Ministry of Defence to educate and support students from Welbeck attending selected degree courses in a range of subjects preparing for a career as a technical officer or engineer in the Armed Forces or Ministry of Defence. Students belong to a support Squadron which is responsible for their leadership development, mentorship, administration and monitoring their academic progress. Defence has closed the Scheme, with the final entry of Defence bursars in the DTUS Squadrons being in 2021.

DTUS Squadron	Partner Universities
Taurus	Birmingham, Aston, Oxford
Trojan	Newcastle, Northumbria, Strathclyde
Typhoon	Loughborough, Cambridge

=== Chairman ===
- 1919 - 1921 Prof. Thomas Frederick Tout (Manchester MEC)
- 1921 - 1926 Prof. Thomas Hudson Beare DL (Edinburgh MEC)
- 1926 - 1936 Prof. Dudley J Medley (Glasgow MEC)
- 1936 - 1946 Prof. J A Nixon CMG (Bristol MEC)
- 1946 - 1953 Col. S J Worsley DSO MC TD (London MEC)
- 1953 - 1959 Brig. Sir Alick Buchanan-Smith CBE TD JP DL (Edinburgh MEC)
- 1959 - 1963 Prof. John Thomas Whetton DSO OBE MC TD (Leeds MEAC)
- 1963 - 1968 Brig. Thomas Rice Henn CBE (Cambridge MEC)
- 1968 - 1982 Prof. Cecil Howard Tonge TD (Northumbrian MEC)
- 1982 - 1989 Prof. Malcolm N Naylor RD DL (London MEC)
- 1989 - 1996 Col. Alan C Roberts MBE TD DL (Leeds MEC)
- 1996 - 2000 Prof. Michael P Furmston TD (Bristol MEC)
- 2000 - 2004 Mr. Shane Guy AE (London MEC)
- 2004 - 2012 Prof. Donald A Ritchie CBE DL (Liverpool MEC)
- 2012 - 2016 Prof. Dick R Clements MBE (Bristol MEC)
- 2016 - 2020 Mr. Roderick G Livingston (Glasgow and Strathclyde MEC)
- 2020 - on. Mr James Castle (Glasgow and Strathclyde MEC)

== Occasional papers ==
- No. 1: University Service Units. What are they really for? by Dr. Patrick Mileham, 2012
- No. 2: The Conundrum of Leadership - Leadership in Government, Foreign Affairs, Defence and Society by Lord Owen, 2013
- No. 3: Leadership in Future Force 2020 by General Sir Richard Barrons, 2014
- No. 4: University Officers’ Training Corps and the First World War by Edward M. Spiers, 2014
- No. 5: Reshaping the British Nuclear Deterrent by Lord David Owen, 2015
- No. 6: Britain's Maritime Future by Jeremy Blackham and Andrew Lambert, 2016
- No. 7: The University Air Squadrons. Early Years 1920-39 by Clive Richards, 2016
- No. 8: Air Power by Michael Graydon and Andrew Lambert, 2018
- No. 9: War in Peacetime. Ambiguous Warfare and the Resurgence of the Russian Military by Christopher Donnelly, 2017
- No. 10: COMEC Rejoinder. The Value of the University Armed Service Units by Dr. Patrick Mileham, 2017
- No. 11: Trustworthiness in Public Life by Onora O’Neill, and National Resilience and the Developing Civil-Military Relationship by David Omand, 2018
- No. 12: Ethics of Fighting Power by Dr. Patrick Mileham, 2020
