= Scottish military units =

Scottish military units may refer to:

- Armed forces in Scotland as part of the British Armed Forces
- Units in former Scottish armies
- Scottish units in former British armies, including: Lowland Brigade and Highland Brigade

== See also ==
- Scottish units of measurement
