= Scottish units =

The term Scottish units may refer to:

== Measurement ==
- Scottish units of measurement

== Military ==
Notable Scottish military units include(d)

- Armed forces in Scotland as part of the British Armed Forces
- Units in former Scottish armies
- Scottish units in former British armies, including:
  - Lowland Brigade
  - Highland Brigade
