= Military of Scotland =

Military of Scotland may refer to:

- Military history of Scotland
- Scottish military when Scotland was an independent country such as the Scots Army
- Armed forces in Scotland as part of the British Armed Forces
- Scottish units in former British armies, including: Lowland Brigade and Highland Brigade
