= Army of Scotland =

Army of Scotland may refer to:

- The Scots Army of the Kingdom of Scotland
- Armed forces in Scotland as part of the British Armed Forces
- Former Scottish units in the British Army, such as the Lowland Brigade and Highland Brigade
