= Scottish military =

Scottish military may refer to:

- Scottish military when Scotland was an independent country such as the Scots Army (see Military history of Scotland)
- Armed forces in Scotland as part of the British Armed Forces
- Scottish units in former British armies, including: Lowland Brigade and Highland Brigade
