= Highland Brigade =

Highland Brigade is the name of several military units:

- Highland Brigade (United Kingdom), a historical formation of the British Army, which has been formed a number of times
- Highland Volunteer Infantry Brigade, a historical formation of the British Volunteer Force, 1889–1902
- Highland Brigade (United Kingdom) (1948–1968), a historical administrative formation of the British Army, 1948–1968
- Polish Independent Highland Brigade, a Polish military unit created in France in 1939, after the fall of Poland
