= Scottish army =

Scottish army may refer to:

- Scots Army, the army of the Kingdom of Scotland
- Armed forces in Scotland, as a part of the present-day British Armed Forces
- Lowland Brigade and Highland Brigade, historical Scottish units of the British Army
