= Warfare in early modern Scotland =

Military activity in the 16th–18th centuries

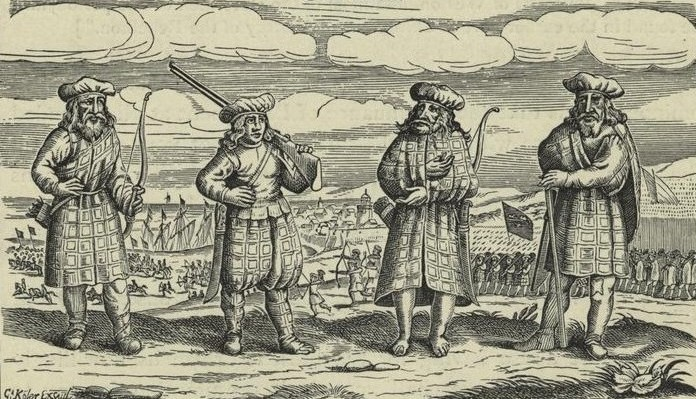
The earliest known image of Scottish soldiers wearing tartan, from a woodcut c. 1631

Warfare in early modern Scotland includes all forms of military activity in Scotland or by Scottish forces, between the adoption of new ideas of the Renaissance in the early sixteenth century and the military defeat of the Jacobite movement in the mid-eighteenth century.

In the late Middle Ages, Scottish armies were assembled on the basis of common service, feudal obligations and money contracts of bonds of manrent. In 1513 these systems produced a large and formidable force, but in the mid-sixteenth century there were difficulties in recruitment. Individuals were expected to provide their own equipment, including axes and pole arms. Highland troops often brought bows and two-handed swords. Heavy armour was abandoned after the Flodden campaign. Highland lords tended to continue to use lighter chainmail and ordinary highlanders dressed in the plaid. The crown took an increasing role in the supply of equipment. The pike replaced the spear and the Scots began to convert from the bow to gunpowder firearms. Feudal heavy cavalry were replaced with light horse, often drawn from the Borders. James IV established a gun foundry in 1511 and gunpowder weaponry fundamentally altered the nature of castle architecture. In the 1540s and 1550s, Scotland was given a defended border of earthwork forts and additions to existing castles.

There were attempts to create royal naval forces in the fifteenth century. James IV founded a harbour at Newhaven and a dockyard at the Pools of Airth. He acquired a total of 38 ships including the Great Michael, at that time the largest in Europe. Scottish ships had some success against privateers, accompanied the king on his expeditions to the islands, and intervened in Scandinavia and the Baltic, but were sold after the Flodden campaign. Scottish naval efforts subsequently relied on privateering captains and hired merchantmen. Despite truces with England there were periodic outbreaks of a guerre de course. James V built a new harbour at Burntisland in 1542. The chief use of naval power in his reign were a series of expeditions to the Isles and France. The Union of Crowns in 1603 ended conflict with England, but England's foreign policy opened up Scottish shipping to attack. In 1626 a squadron of three ships were bought and equipped for protection and there were marque fleets of privateers. In 1627, the Royal Scots Navy and privateers participated in the major expedition to Biscay. The Scots also returned to West Indies and in 1629 took part in the capture of Quebec.

In the early seventeenth century large numbers of Scots took service in foreign armies involved in the Thirty Years' War. As armed conflict between the Covenanter regime in Scotland and Charles I in the Bishops' Wars became likely, many mercenaries returned home, including experienced leaders like Alexander and David Leslie and these veterans played an important role in training recruits. Covenanter armies intervened in the Wars of the Three Kingdoms in England and Ireland. Scottish infantry were generally armed with a combination of pike and shot, but individuals may have had weapons including bows and polearms. Most cavalry were probably equipped with pistols and swords, but may have included lancers. Royalist armies, like those led by James Graham, Marquis of Montrose (1643–44) and in Glencairn's rising (1653–54), were mainly composed of conventionally armed infantry with pike and shot. Montrose's forces were short of heavy artillery suitable for siege warfare and had only a small force of cavalry. During the Bishops' Wars, Scottish privateers took English prizes. After the Covenanters allied with the English Parliament they established two patrol squadrons for the Atlantic and North Sea coasts, known collectively as the "Scotch Guard". The Scottish navy was unable to withstand the English fleet that accompanied the army led by Cromwell that conquered Scotland in 1649–51 and Scottish ships and crews were split up among the Commonwealth fleet. During the English occupation, more fortresses in the style of the trace italienne were built.

At the Restoration, infantry regiments and a few troops of horse were established and there were attempts to found a national militia on the English model. The standing army was mainly employed in the suppression of Covenanter rebellions and the guerrilla war undertaken by the Cameronians in the East. Pikemen became less important and after the introduction of the socket bayonet disappeared altogether, while matchlock muskets were replaced by the more reliable flintlock. On the eve of the Glorious Revolution the standing army in Scotland was about 3,250 men. The Scots were drawn into King William II's continental wars. Scottish seamen received protection against arbitrary impressment, but a fixed quota of conscripts for the Royal Navy was levied from the sea-coast burghs. There were now Royal Navy patrols in Scottish waters even in peacetime. Scottish privateers played a major part in the Second Anglo-Dutch War. In the 1690s a fleet of five ships was established for the Darien Scheme, and a professional navy of three warships to protect local shipping. After the Act of Union in 1707, these vessels were transferred to the Royal Navy. At the Union, the standing army was seven units of infantry, two of horse and one troop of Horse Guards, besides varying levels of fortress artillery. As part of the British Army, Scottish regiments took part in a series of wars on the European continent. The first official Highland regiment to be raised for the British army was the Black Watch in 1740, but the growth of Highland regiments was delayed by the 1745 Jacobite Rebellion. The bulk of Jacobite armies were made up of Highlanders, serving in clan regiments. The Jacobites often started campaigns poorly armed, but arms became more conventional as the rebellions progressed.

== Sixteenth century ==
=== Royal armies ===
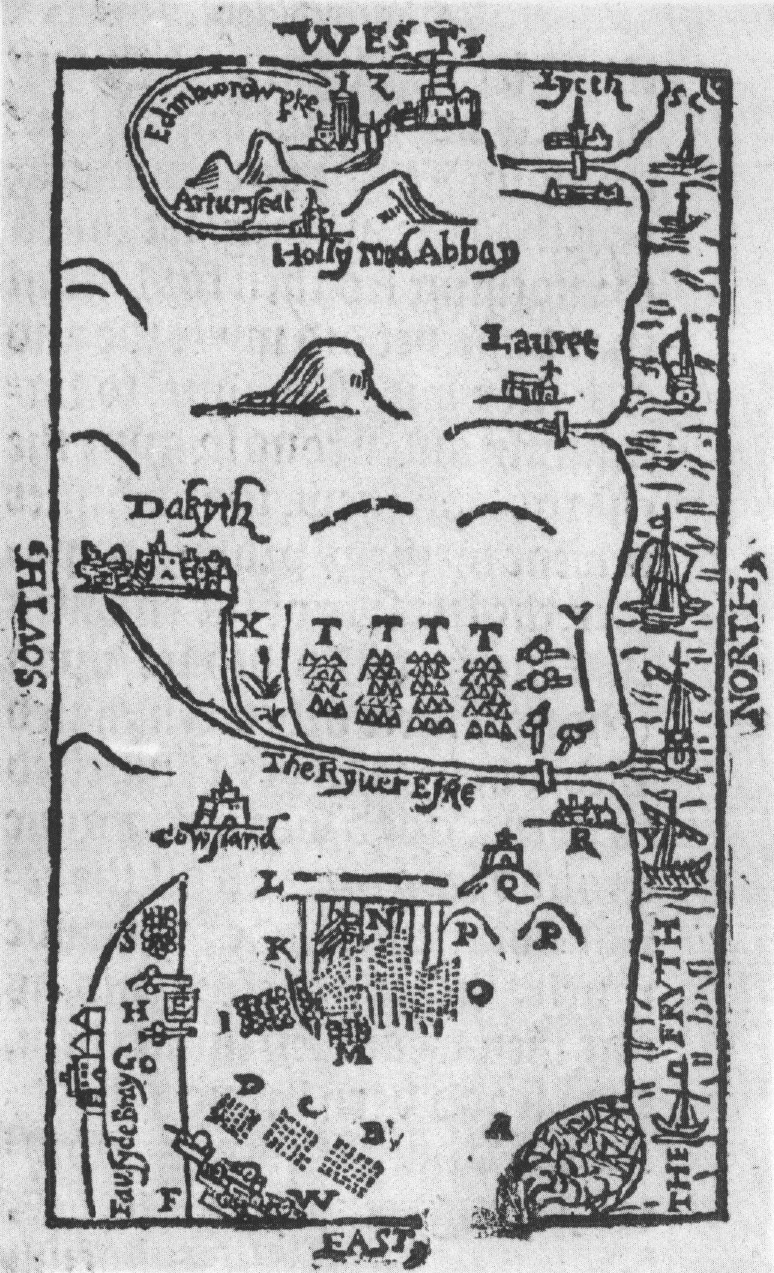
Battle of Pinkie, woodcut illustration from William Patten (1548)

In the later Middle Ages, Scottish armies were still largely assembled on the basis of common service and feudal obligations, with the addition of troops maintained by money contracts of bonds or bands of manrent. Common service theoretically called all men between the ages of 16 and 60 for a maximum of 40 days in one year. Such troops were expected to serve at their own expense and to bring their own supplies, a factor that severely limited the ability of Scottish armies to take part in sustained campaigning. Feudalism had been introduced to Scotland in the twelfth century, meaning that knights held castles and estates in exchange for service, providing troops on a 40-day basis, particularly heavily armed noble cavalry. Bonds of manrent were similar to English indentures of the same period, used to retain more professional troops, particular men-at-arms and archers. Scotland relied on these systems longer than was the case in England. In practice, forms of service tended to blur and overlap, and major Scottish lords continued to bring contingents from their kindred. In 1513 for the Flodden campaign these systems were successful in producing a large and formidable force, but in the religious and politically divided mid-sixteenth century there is evidence that the authorities were experiencing increasing difficulty in recruitment.

A series of musters or wapenshaws, between two and four times a year, checked that potential soldiers maintained suitable equipment. Individuals were expected to equip themselves for war according to their estates. Instructions given to sheriffs in 1513 indicated that gentlemen were expected to muster in plate armour, while common soldiers were to come in jacks and sallets. After the disaster at Flodden there seems to have been a deliberate abandonment of plate armour by the nobility, perhaps because of the difficulties it created in handling a pike, and by 1547 many noblemen were virtually indistinguishable from the majority of troops. Highland lords continued to use lighter chainmail and ordinary highlanders dressed in the plaid, leaving their lower legs naked. In place of a jack, they often had a patchwork linen garment, covered with wax or pitch. A clan leader like John Grant of Freuchie in 1596 could muster from his kin, friends, and servants 500 men able to fight for James VI and the Sheriff of Moray. Of these 40 had habergeons, two handled swords, and helmets, and another 40 were armed "according to the Highland custom" with bows, helmets, swords, and targes.

Weapons included various forms of axes and pole arms, including spears, the Lochaber axe, Leith axe and Jedburgh stave. Highland troops often brought bows, two-handed swords (claidheamh mór) and axes. The crown took an increasing role in the supply of equipment. There were attempts to replace polearms with longer pikes of 15.5 feet (5 m) to 18.5 feet (6 m) in the later fifteenth century, in emulation of successes over mounted troops in the Netherlands and Switzerland, but this does not appear to have been successful until the eve of the Flodden campaign in early sixteenth century. By the mid-sixteenth century the pike had emerged as the most important infantry weapon in Scottish armies. Modelling themselves on Swiss and German infantry, Scottish tactics tended to focus on rapidly engaging the enemy, particularly necessary to counter the advantage enjoyed by the English in missile power.

Like most European nations the Scots in this period began to convert from the bow to gunpowder firearms. Handguns were present in Scottish armies in small numbers from the fifteenth century and there are increasingly frequent references to handguns and arquebus in records. An account of the Scottish vanguard at Haddon Rig in 1542 suggests that half the troops were missile men and half of those were arquebusiers. Equal proportions of missile to melee troops seems to have been an aim of Scottish commanders for most of the century, although it was not always possible in the field. The main source of firearms were the French, who seem to have extensively rearmed the Scottish after the English invasions of the Rough Wooing.

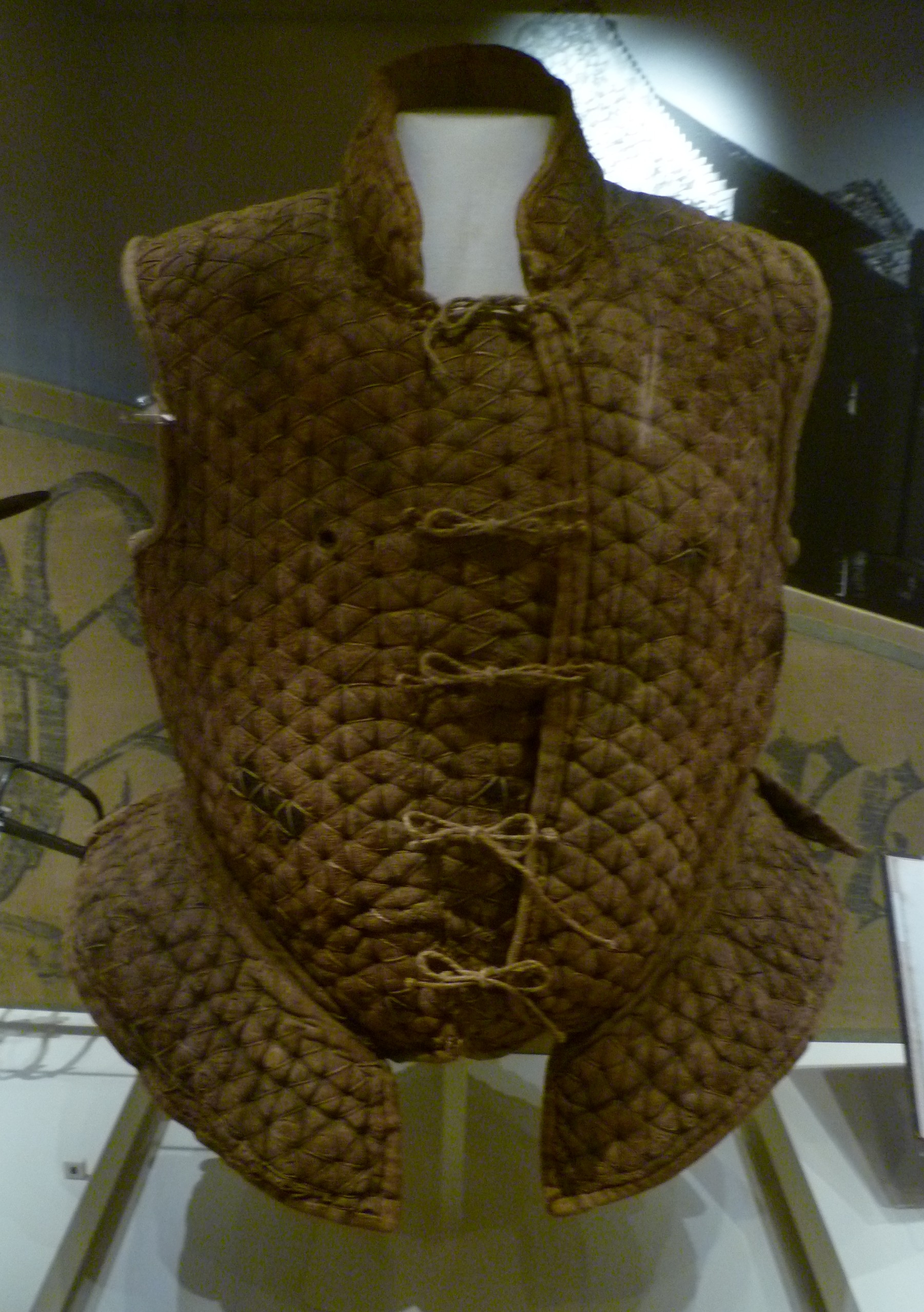
A leather jack of the kind worn by in the sixteenth century

The English enjoyed a marked superiority over the Scots in cavalry, particularly with the resurgence of heavy cavalry with their use of demi-lancers. The feudal heavy cavalry had begun to disappear from Scottish armies after Bannockburn in 1314. It was limited by the shortage of suitable horses. James V imported great horses and mares from Denmark in an attempt to improve the quality of Scottish breading stock. In the mid-sixteenth century the Scots still lacked sufficient heavy cavalry. In their place they fielded relatively large numbers of light horse, often drawn from the Borders and usually wearing jacks of leather or mail, mounted on small horses and using light lances. As firearms became available they began to field relatively large numbers of mounted arquebusiers.

=== Artillery and siege warfare ===
James IV brought in experts from France, Germany and the Netherlands and established a gun foundry in 1511. Edinburgh Castle had a house of artillery where visitors could see cannon cast for what became a formidable train, allowing him to send cannon to France and Ireland and to quickly subdue Norham Castle in the Flodden campaign. However, his 18 heavy artillery pieces had to be drawn by 400 oxen and slowed the advancing Scots army, proving ineffective against the longer-range and smaller-calibre English guns at the Battle of Flodden Field.

Gunpowder weaponry fundamentally altered the nature of castle architecture from the mid-fifteenth century, with existing castles being adapted to allow the use of gunpowder weapons by the incorporation of "keyhole" gun ports, platforms to mount guns and walls being modified to resist bombardment. Ravenscraig, Kirkcaldy, begun about 1460, is probably the first castle in the British Isles to be built as an artillery fort, incorporating "D-shape" bastions that would better resist cannon fire and on which artillery could be mounted. In the period of French intervention in the 1540s and 1550s, at the end of the Rough Wooing, Scotland was given a defended border of a series of earthwork forts and additions to existing castles. These included the erection of single bastions at Edinburgh (by Migliorino Ubaldini), Stirling and Dunbar; the creation of the Scots' Dike on the western end of the border; trace italienne fortresses at Leith, Inchkeith (by Lorenzo Pomarelli) and Langholm; work was also begun by Camillo Marini at Jedburgh and Kelso. The most aggressive move was a fortified artillery park at Eyemouth, only 6 miles (10 km) from the English border stronghold of Berwick.

=== Royal navy ===
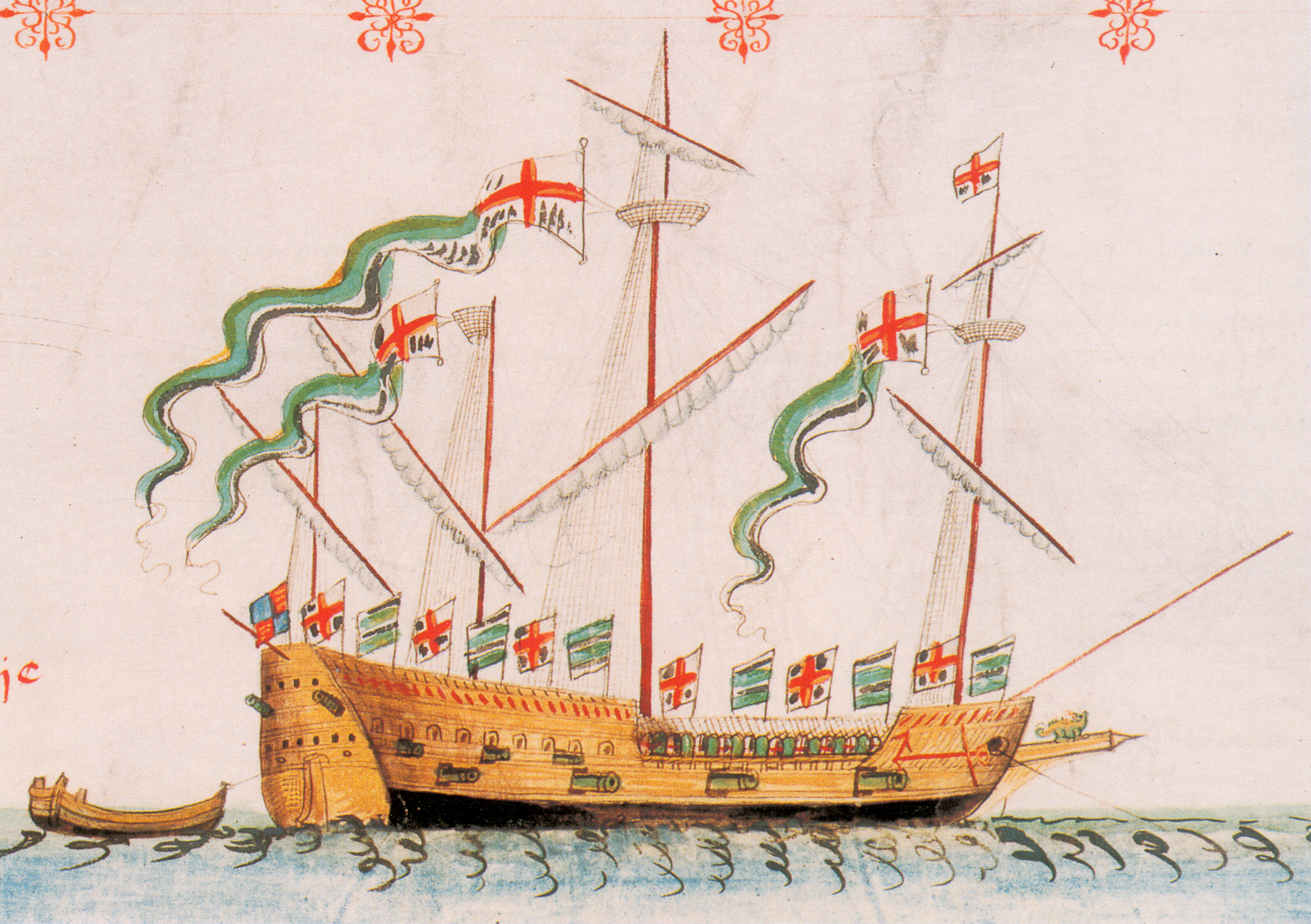
The captured Salamander, in the English Anthony Roll

There were various attempts to create royal naval forces in the fifteenth century. James IV put the enterprise on a new footing, founding a harbour at Newhaven in May 1504, and two years later ordering the construction of a dockyard at the Pools of Airth. The upper reaches of the Forth were protected by new fortifications on Inchgarvie. The king acquired a total of 38 ships for the Royal Scottish Navy, including the Margaret, and the carrack Michael or Great Michael. The latter, built at great expense at Newhaven and launched in 1511, was 240 feet (73 m) in length, weighed 1,000 tons, had 24 cannon, and was, at that time, the largest ship in Europe. Scottish ships had some success against privateers, accompanied the king in his expeditions in the islands and intervened in conflicts in Scandinavia and the Baltic. In the Flodden campaign the fleet consisted of 16 large and 10 smaller craft. After a raid on Carrickfergus in Ireland, it joined up with the French and had little impact on the war. After the disaster at Flodden the Great Michael, and perhaps other ships, were sold to the French. The king's ships disappeared from royal records after 1516 and Scottish naval efforts would rely on privateering captains and hired merchantmen during the minority of James V. In the Italian War of 1521–26, in which England and Scotland became involved on opposing sides, the Scots had six men-of-war active attacking English and Imperial shipping and they blockaded the Humber in 1523. Although prizes were taken by Robert Barton and other captains, the naval campaign was sporadic and indecisive.

James V entered his majority in 1524. He did not share his father's interest in building a navy, relying on French gifts such as the Salamander, or captured ships like the English Mary Willoughby. Scotland's shipbuilding remained largely at the level of boat building and ship repairs and fell behind the Low Countries which led the way into semi-industrialised ship building. Despite truces between England and Scotland there were periodic outbreaks of commerce raiding in the 1530s with at least four of a known six men-at-war were royal naval vessels on the Scottish side. James V built a new harbour at Burntisland in 1542, called 'Our Lady Port' or 'New Haven,' described in 1544 as having three blockhouses with guns and a pier for great ships to lie in a dock. The chief use of naval power in his reign were a series of expeditions to the Isles and France. In 1536 the king circumnavigated the Isles, embarking at Pittenween in Fife and landing Whithorn in Galloway. Later in the year he sailed from Kirkcaldy with six ships including the 600 ton Mary Willoughby, and arrived at Dieppe to begin his courtship of his first wife Madeleine of Valois. After his marriage he sailed from Le Havre in the Mary Willoughby to Leith with four great Scottish ships and ten French. After the death of Queen Madeleine, John Barton, in the Salamander returned to France in 1538 to pick up the new prospective queen, Mary of Guise, with the Moriset and Mary Willoughby. In 1538 James V embarked on the newly equipped Salamander at Leith and accompanied by the Mary Willoughby, the Great Unicorn, the Little Unicorn, the Lion and twelve other ships sailed to Kirkwall on Orkney. Then he went to Lewis on the West, perhaps using the newly compiled charts from his first voyage known as Alexander Lindsay's Rutter.

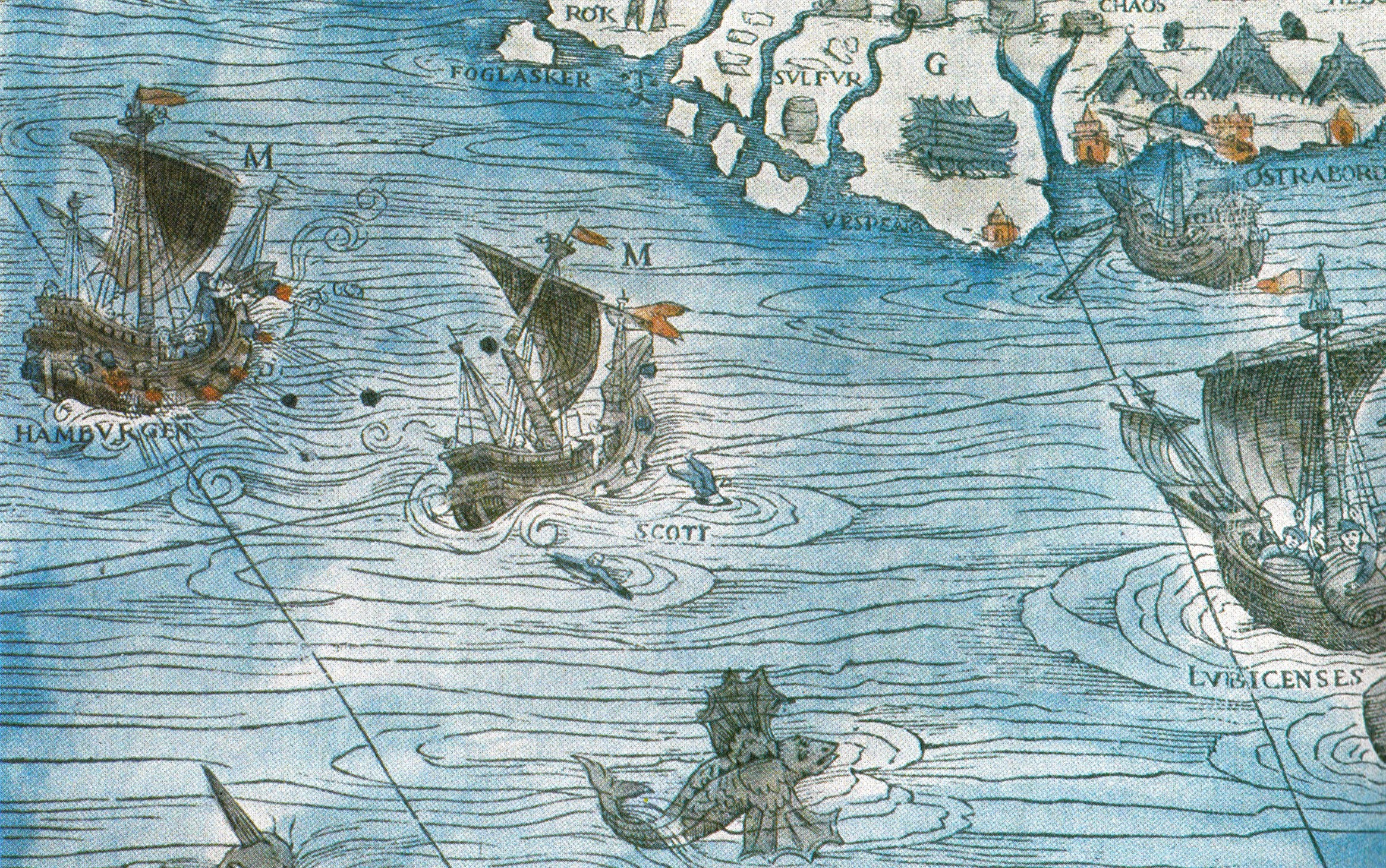
A Scottish armed merchantman engaged in the Baltic trade is attacked by a Hanseatic ship. Detail from a sixteenth-century map.

Scottish privateers and pirates preyed on shipping in the North Sea and off the Atlantic coast of France. Scotland's Admiralty court judged whether a captured ship was a lawful prize and dealt with the recovery of goods. As the court was entitled to a tenth of the value of a prize, it was a profitable business for the admiral. The privateers Andrew and Robert Barton were still using their letters of reprisal of 1506 against the Portuguese in 1561. The Bartons operated down the east coast of Britain from Leven and the Firth of Forth, while others used the French Channel ports such as Rouen and Dieppe or the Atlantic port of Brest as bases. During the Rough Wooing in 1542, the Mary Willoughby, the Lion, and the Salamander under the command of John Barton, son of Robert Barton, attacked merchants and fishermen off Whitby. They later blockaded a London merchant ship called the Antony of Bruges in a creek on the coast of Brittany. In 1544 Edinburgh was attacked by an English marine force and burnt. The Salamander and the Scottish-built Unicorn were captured at Leith. The Scots still had two royal naval vessels and numerous smaller private vessels, but would have to rely on privateers until the re-establishment of a royal fleet in the 1620s. When, as a result of the series of international treaties, the emperor Charles V declared war upon Scotland in 1544, the Scots were able to engage in a highly profitable campaign of privateering that lasted six years and the gains of which probably outweighed the losses in trade with the Low Countries. They also operated in the West Indies from the 1540s, joining the French in the capture of Burburuta in 1567. English and Scottish naval warfare and privateering broke out sporadically in the 1550s. In 1559, English captain William Winter was sent north with 34 ships and dispersed and captured the Scottish and French fleets, leading to the eventual evacuation of the French from Scotland, and a successful coup of the Protestant Lords of the Congregation. Scottish and English interests were re-aligned and the naval conflict subsided.

== Early seventeenth century ==
=== Royal and marque fleets ===
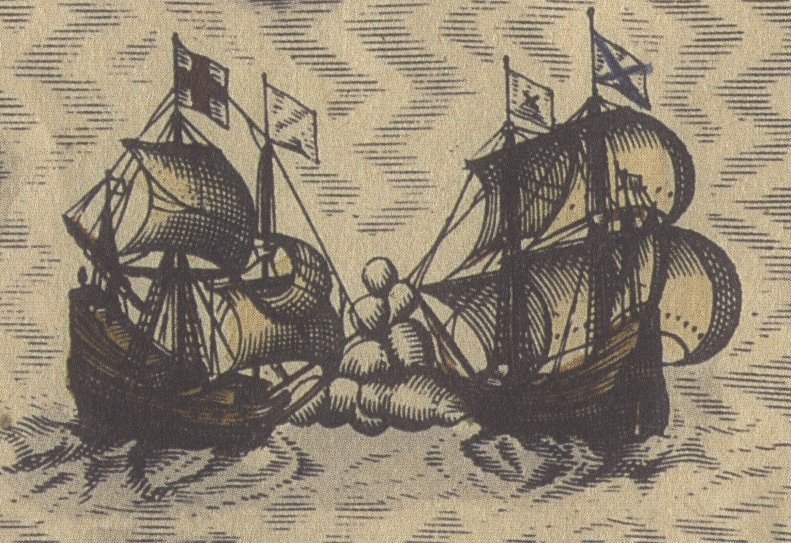
English and Scottish warships on John Speed's Map of Scotland, 1610

After the Union of Crowns in 1603 conflict between Scotland and England ended, but Scotland found itself involved in England's foreign policy, opening up Scottish shipping to attack. In the 1620s, Scotland found herself fighting a naval war as England's ally, first against Spain and then also against France, while simultaneously embroiled in undeclared North Sea commitments in the Danish intervention in the Thirty Years' War. In 1626 a squadron of three ships were bought and equipped at a cost of least £5,200 sterling, to guard against privateers operating out of Spanish-controlled Dunkirk and other ships were armed in preparation for potential action. The acting High Admiral John Gordon of Lochinvar organised at least three marque fleets of privateers. It was probably one of Lochinvar's marque fleets that was sent to support the English Royal Navy defending Irish waters in 1626. In 1627, the Royal Scots Navy, and accompanying contingents of burgh privateers, participated in the major expedition to Biscay. The Scots also returned to the West Indies, with Lochinvar taking French prizes and founding the colony of Charles Island. In 1629 two squadrons of privateers led by Lochinvar and William Lord Alexander, sailed for Canada, taking part in the campaign that resulted in the capture of Quebec from the French, which was handed back after the subsequent peace.

=== Covenanter armies ===
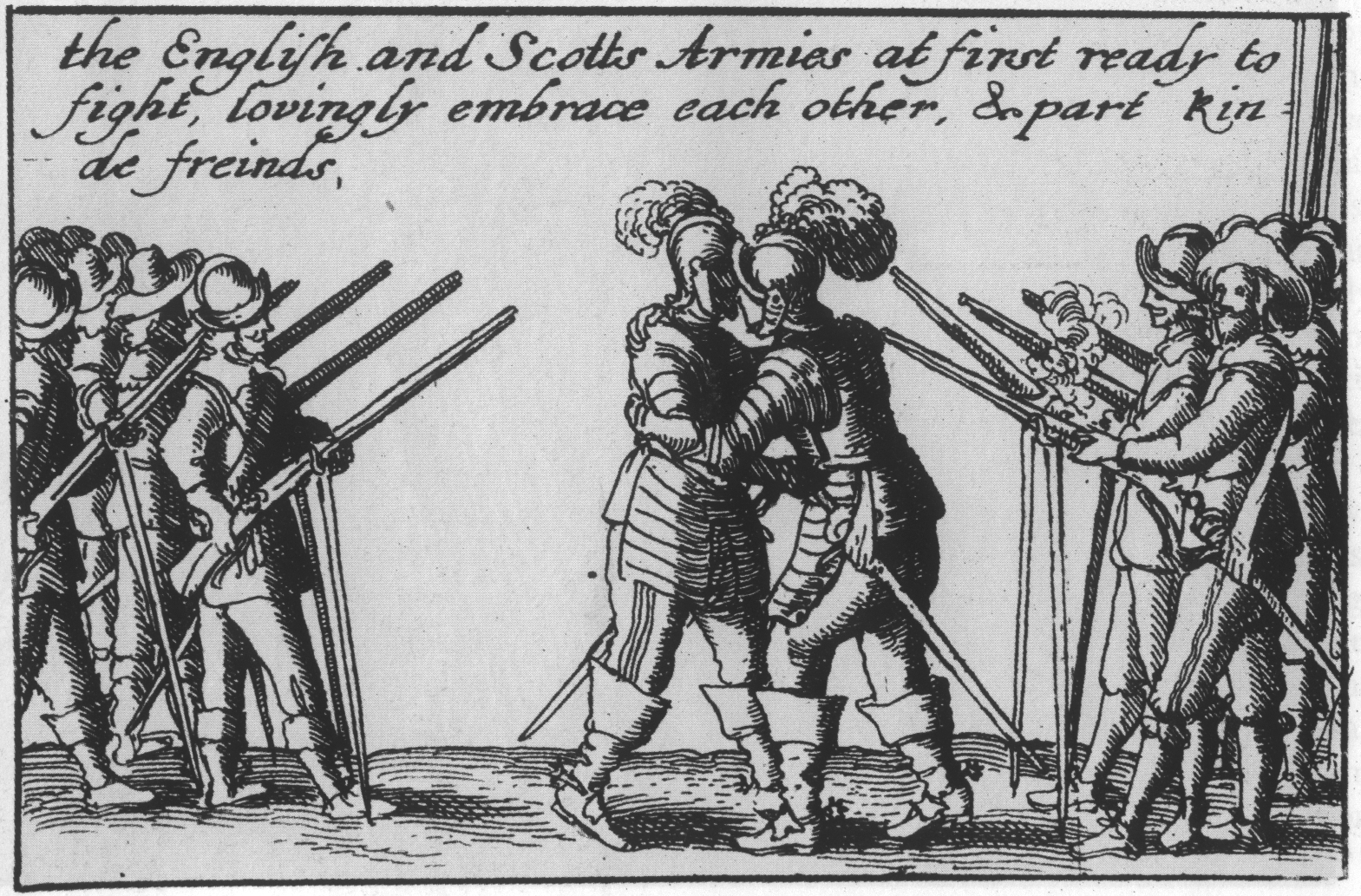
The English and Scots armies meet in the First Civil War

In the early seventeenth century relatively large numbers of Scots took service in foreign armies involved in the Thirty Years' War, with 20–30,000 in Swedish service, a Scots brigade in the Netherlands, and 5–6,000 raised for Danish service in the period 1626–27, 11,000 for France and large numbers in the armies of eastern Europe, including German states, Poland and Russia. As armed confrontation between Scotland and the Charles I looked increasingly likely from 1637, the Standing Committee of the Tables began to function as a war council. It appointed two lairds in every parish to draw up lists of men suitable for military service, arms and the names of Scots serving abroad so that they could be recalled. Three commissioners were appointed in each shire, two residing in Edinburgh and another remaining in the locality, where presbyteries appointed commissioners to communicate instructions to the parishes. Hundreds of Scots mercenaries returned home from foreign service, including experienced leaders like Alexander and David Leslie. These veterans played an important role in training the parish recruits. Nobles were able to raise regiments, which usually bore their name as colonel, and they could appoint company commanders, but the lieutenant colonel and sergeant major of the regiment, and the lieutenant and sergeant of each company, were to be professional soldiers. The returning soldiers also brought expertise in fortification and trace italliene fortifications were added at Leith, Burntisland and Greenock. They would play a major role in the siege of Edinburgh in 1650.

The appointment of Leslie as field marshal avoided a contest between inexperienced nobles for leadership and his reputation made the service by Scottish mercenaries in Covenanter armies more likely. He became an ex offico member of the Tables, enabling him to influence policy and take part in issuing dispatches. Although producing a relatively large and efficiently organised army, it was hastily assembled, and short of money and supplies. The Covenanting regime had to make assessments on parishes and relied on loans from Edinburgh merchants, making a long campaign difficult to sustain. In the view of historian James Scott Wheeler, the first Covenanter army was "marginally trained, irregularly armed, poorly paid and badly supplied", but it proved sufficient to the task.

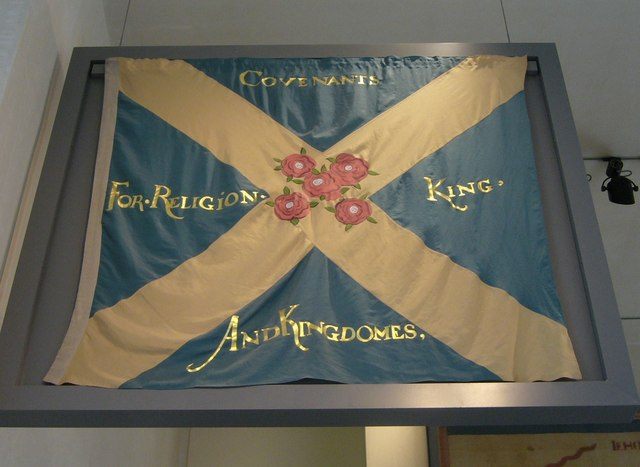
Replica of a Scottish Saltire of the War of Three Kingdoms

Between the two Bishops' Wars the Covenanters maintained one regiment of infantry and many of their officers who had drilled the local militias on half pay. The militias were now armed with firearms purchased in the Netherlands. The Tables were replaced with a committee of estates, with wide-ranging powers, and kept to same system of commissioners. One in four able bodied men were able to muster when mobilisation began for renewed confrontation in 1640. The army was paid for by more loans and a new national tax known as the "tenth" or "tenth penny". These systems would form the basis of the Covenanter armies that operated in Ireland, intervened in the First Civil War (1642–46) in England on the side of Parliament and subsequently, and less successfully, on the side of the king in the Second (1648–49) and Third Civil Wars (1649–51).

Scottish Lowland infantry were generally armed, as was almost universal in Western Europe, with a combination of pike and shot. Pikes were theoretically 16 feet (5 m) long, but were often shortened by a foot or two to make them more manageable, this had disastrous consensuses at the Battle of Benburb (1646), where the Confederate Irish defeated the Scots because they possessed longer pikes. Musketeers were mainly armed with matchlock muskets, with some firelocks (probably mainly reserved for troops defending the baggage and ammunition) and there were a handful of troops that brought more accurate rifled guns. Continental experience tended to increasingly emphasise firepower over melee and this was reflected in the greater proportions of shot to pike, usually in proportions of three to two. Scottish armies also had Gaelic speaking Highland contingents who fought as individuals as much as for their Chiefs with older types of weapons including recurved short bows and standard longbows, Lochaber axes, and halberds. Lowland recruits who lacked pike and shot were also told to report with these. Most cavalry were probably equipped with pistols and swords, although there is some evidence that they included lancers.

Royalist armies, like those led by James Graham, Marquis of Montrose (1643–44) and in Glencairn's rising (1653–54) were mainly composed of conventionally armed infantry with pike and shot. Montrose's army also included a contingent of Irish Confederate troops and Scottish Redshanks from Highland clans hostile to the Clan Campbell, under the under leadership of Alasdair Mac Colla. Glencairn's rising gained some support from Lowland Scottish lords and at its height had 3,500 infantry and 1,500 cavalry. The forces under Montrose's command reached about the same numbers of infantry, but were short of heavy artillery suitable for siege warfare and had only a small force of cavalry, about 300, supplied from the estate of the Earls of Huntly.

=== Covenanter navies ===
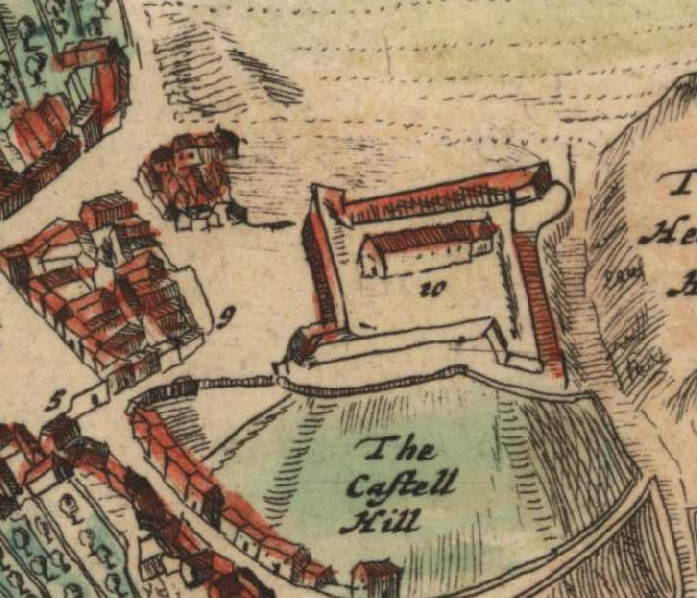
Detail of a map of Aberdeen in 1661, showing the fort erected during the Commonwealth

During the Bishops' Wars the king attempted to blockade Scotland, disrupting trade and the transport of returning troops from the continent. The king planned amphibious assaults from England on the east coast and from Ireland to the west, but they failed to materialise. Scottish privateers took English prizes and the Covenanters planned to fit out Dutch ships with Scottish and Dutch crews to join the naval war effort. After the Covenanters allied with the English Parliament they established two patrol squadrons for the Atlantic and North Sea coasts, known collectively as the "Scotch Guard". These patrols guarded against Royalist attempts to move men, money and munitions and raids on Scottish shipping, particularly from ships based in Wexford and Dunkirk. They consisted mainly of small English warships, controlled by the Commissioners of the Navy based in London, but it always relied heavily on Scottish officers and revenues, and after 1646, the West Coast squadron became much more a Scottish force. The Scottish navy was unable to withstand the English fleet that accompanied the army led by Cromwell that conquered Scotland in 1649–51. The Scottish ships and crews were divided among the Commonwealth fleet.

=== Fortifications ===
During the English occupation of Scotland under the Commonwealth, fortresses in the style of the trace italienne were built. These were polygonal in plan with triangular bastions, as at Ayr, Inverness and Leith. Twenty smaller forts were built as far away as Orkney and Stornoway. Control of the Highlands was secured by strongpoints at Inverlocky and Inverness. These were built at a massive cost in money and manpower. The citadel at Inverness, begun in 1652 and using stone shipped from as far away as Aberdeen, had cost £50,0000 when it was still unfinished by 1655. Inverlochy had a garrison of 1,000 and from 1654 became the centre for a new administrative region of Lochaber, made up of three of the most remote and lawless shires.

== Later seventeenth century ==
=== Restoration army ===
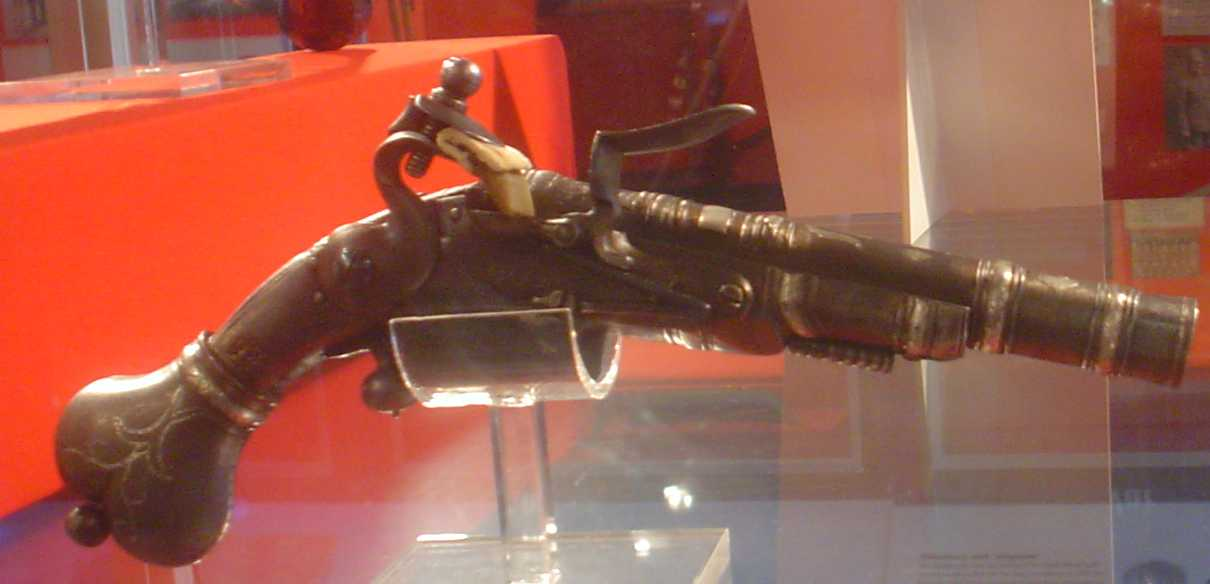
A Scottish flintlock pistol made in Dundee

At the Restoration the Privy Council established a force of an unknown number of infantry regiments and a few troops of horse. The Commonwealth fortresses were abandoned, but garrisons were placed in Edinburgh, Stirling, Dumbarton and Blackness castles. There were attempts to found a national militia on the English model. The standing army was mainly employed in the suppression of Covenanter rebellions and the guerilla war undertaken by the Cameronians in the East. Units included a regiment of foot guards, later known as the Scots Guards and Le Regiment of Douglas, formed and serving in France since 1633, it returned, eventually became the Royal Regiment of Foot. Pikemen became less important in the late seventeenth century and after the introduction of the socket bayonet, a process complete by 1702, disappeared altogether, while matchlock muskets were replaced by the more reliable flintlock. Three troops of Scots Dragoons were raised in 1678 and another three were added to make The Royal Regiment of Scots Dragoons in 1681. On the eve of the Glorious Revolution the standing army in Scotland was about 3,000 men in various regiments and another 268 veterans in the major garrison towns, at an annual cost of about £80,000. After the Glorious Revolution the Scots were drawn into King William II's continental wars, beginning with the Nine Years' War in Flanders (1689–97).

=== Restoration navy ===
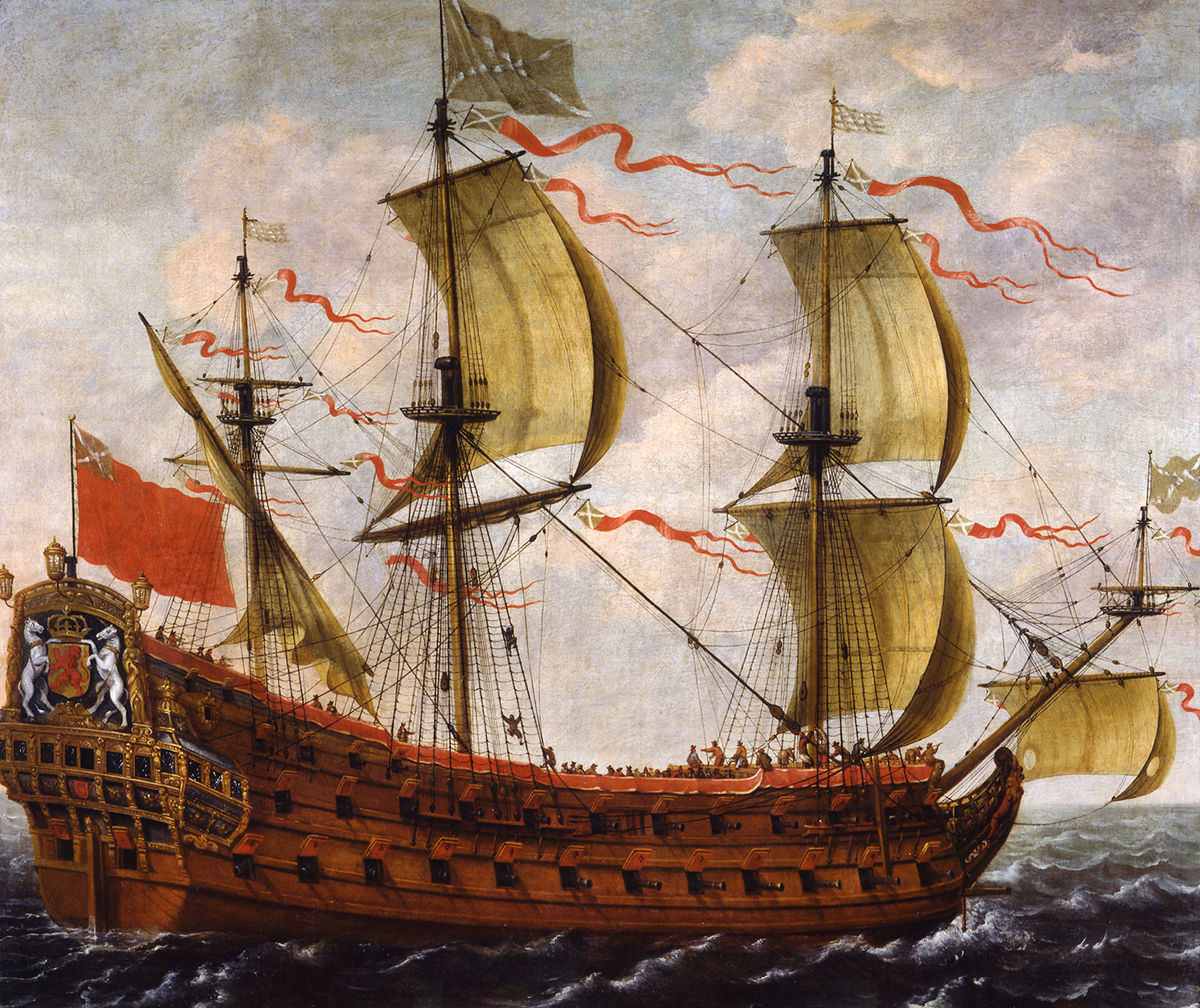
Painting of a Scottish ship, perhaps part of the Darien fleet, by an unknown artist

Although Scottish seamen received protection against arbitrary impressment onto English men-of-war under Charles II, a fixed quota of conscripts for the Royal Navy was levied from the sea-coast burghs during the second half of the seventeenth century. Royal Navy patrols were now found in Scottish waters even in peacetime, such as the small ship-of-the-line HMS Kingfisher, which bombarded Carrick Castle during the Earl of Argyll's rebellion in 1685. Scotland went to war against the Dutch and their allies in the Second (1665–67) and Third Anglo-Dutch Wars (1672–74) as an independent kingdom. Scottish captains, at least 80 and perhaps 120, took letters of marque, and privateers played a major part in the naval conflict of the wars.

By 1697 the English Royal Navy had 323 warships, while Scotland was still dependent on merchantman and privateers. In the 1690s, two separate schemes for larger naval forces were put in motion. As usual, the larger part was played by the merchant community rather than the government. The first was the Darien Scheme to found a Scottish colony in Spanish controlled America. It was undertaken by the Company of Scotland, who created a fleet of five ships, including the Caledonia and the St. Andrew, built or chartered in Holland and Hamburg. It sailed to Isthmus of Darien in 1698, but the venture failed and only one ship returned to Scotland. In the same period it was decided to establish a professional navy for the protection of commerce in home waters during the Nine Years' War, with three purpose-built warships bought from English shipbuilders in 1696. These were the Royal William, a 32-gun fifth rate, and two smaller ships, the Royal Mary and the Dumbarton Castle, each of 24 guns and generally described as frigates. After the Act of Union in 1707, the Scottish Navy merged with that of England and the three vessels of the small Royal Scottish Navy were transferred to the Royal Navy.

== Early eighteenth century ==
=== Royal army ===
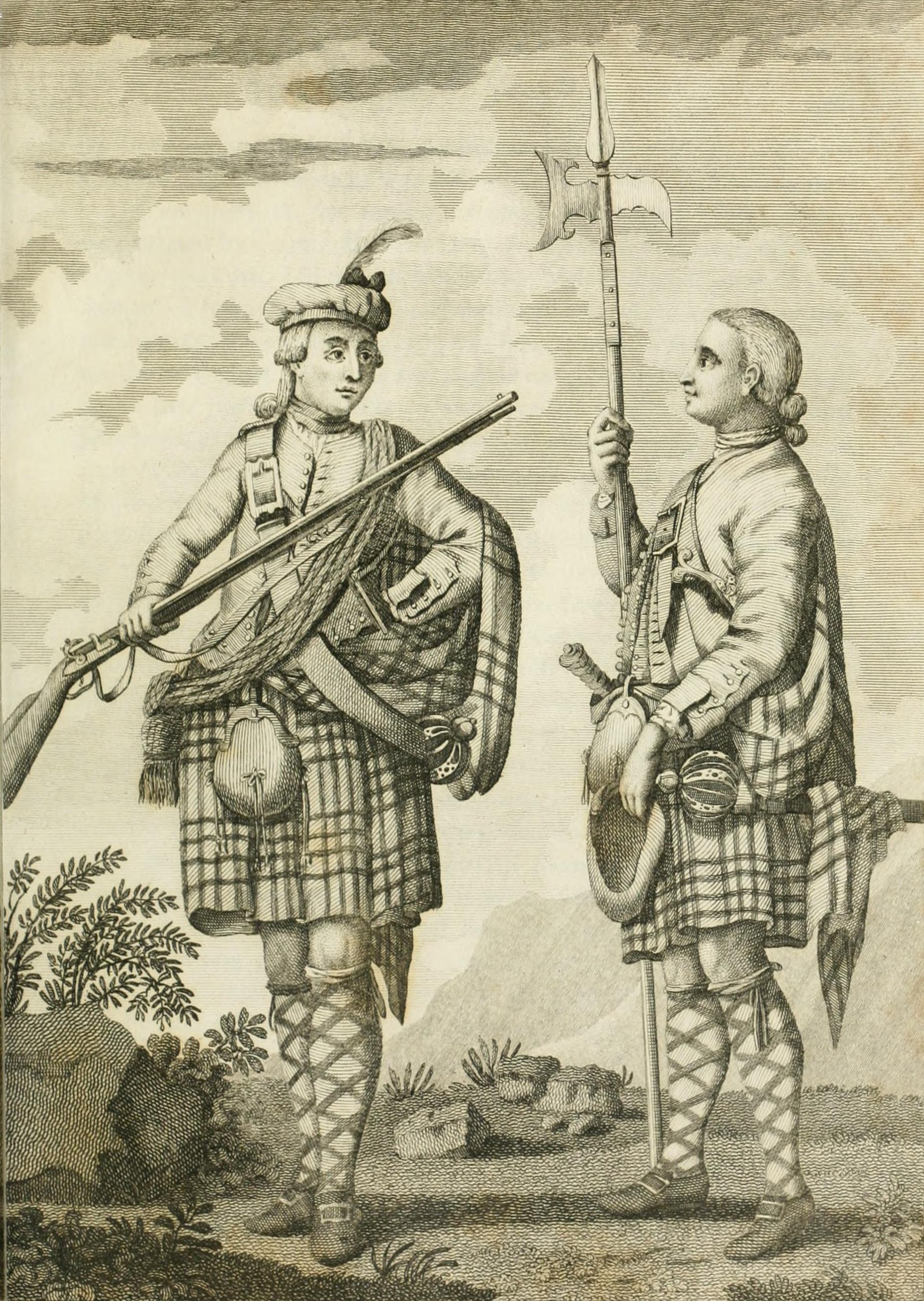
An officer and sergeant of a Highland regiment, c. 1740. The appearance of many Jacobite soldiers may have been similar.

By the time of the act of Union, the Kingdom of Scotland had a standing army of seven units of infantry, two of horse and one troop of Horse Guards, besides varying levels of fortress artillery in the garrison castles of Edinburgh, Dumbarton, and Stirling. Their role was of such importance that the Scots Parliament forced Queen Anne to give royal assent to the controversial Act of Security 1704 by threatening to withdraw Scottish forces back out of the Confederate armies. The new British Army created by the Act of Union in 1707 incorporated existing Scottish regiments, such as the Scots Guards, The Royal Scots 1st of Foot, King's Own Scottish Borderers 25th of Foot, The Cameronians 26th of Foot, Scots Greys and the Royal Scots Fusiliers 21st of Foot. The new armed forces were controlled by the War Office and Admiralty from London. During this period, Scottish soldiers and sailors were instrumental in supporting the expansion of the British Empire and became involved in international conflicts, including the War of the Spanish Succession (1702–13), the Quadruple Alliance (1718–20), wars with Spain (1727–29) and (1738–48) and the War of the Austrian Succession (1740–48). The first official Highland regiment to be raised for the British army was the Black Watch, the 43rd (later 42nd) regiment, in 1740. It marked the beginning of a major role for Highlanders within the British military structure, but the growth of Highland regiments was delayed by the 1745 Jacobite Rebellion and would not begin in earnest until the late 1750s.

=== Jacobite armies ===
The bulk of Jacobite armies were made up of Highlanders, serving in clan regiments in similar vein to their make up in the previous two centuries but had been affected by the Disarming Act deliberately aimed at reducing their capability. They were 70 per cent of the forces in the 1715 rebellion and over 90 per cent of those in 1745. Many were forced to join by their clan chiefs, landlords or feudal superiors and desertion was a major problem during campaigns though this had always been a feature of Clan Warfare operating under a loosely voluntary system known as "Calpa" within the clan system. The Jacobites suffered from a lack of trained officers. A typical clan regiment was made up of a small minority of gentlemen (tacksmen) who would bear the clan name. The clan gentlemen formed the front ranks of the unit and were more heavily armed than their tenants who made up the bulk of the regiment and who had been affected more strongly by the efforts to disarm the Gaeltachd. Because they served in the front ranks, the gentlemen suffered higher proportional casualties than the common clansman. The Jacobites often started campaigns poorly armed but improved through weapons captures. In the rising of 1745, at the Battle of Prestonpans, some only had swords, Lochaber axes, pitchforks and scythes, but arms tended to become more conventional as the campaigns progressed. Only officers and gentlemen were equipped with a broadsword, targe and pistol. After the Battle of Culloden in 1746, the Hanoverian commander the Duke of Cumberland reported that there were 2,320 firelocks recovered from the battlefield, but only 190 broadswords. However, this figure should be accepted with caution for a number of reasons including that ancestral family swords would be taken off the battlefield by retreating clansmen, that there were enough captured swords to be retained to display around the stately homes of English and Lowland officers, to build "fences" in London by The Duke of Cumberland and that many in the Hanoverian army were retaining captured swords for sale or "souvenirs" of the battle.
