= Highland Brigade (United Kingdom) (1948–1968) =

N Group Highland Brigade
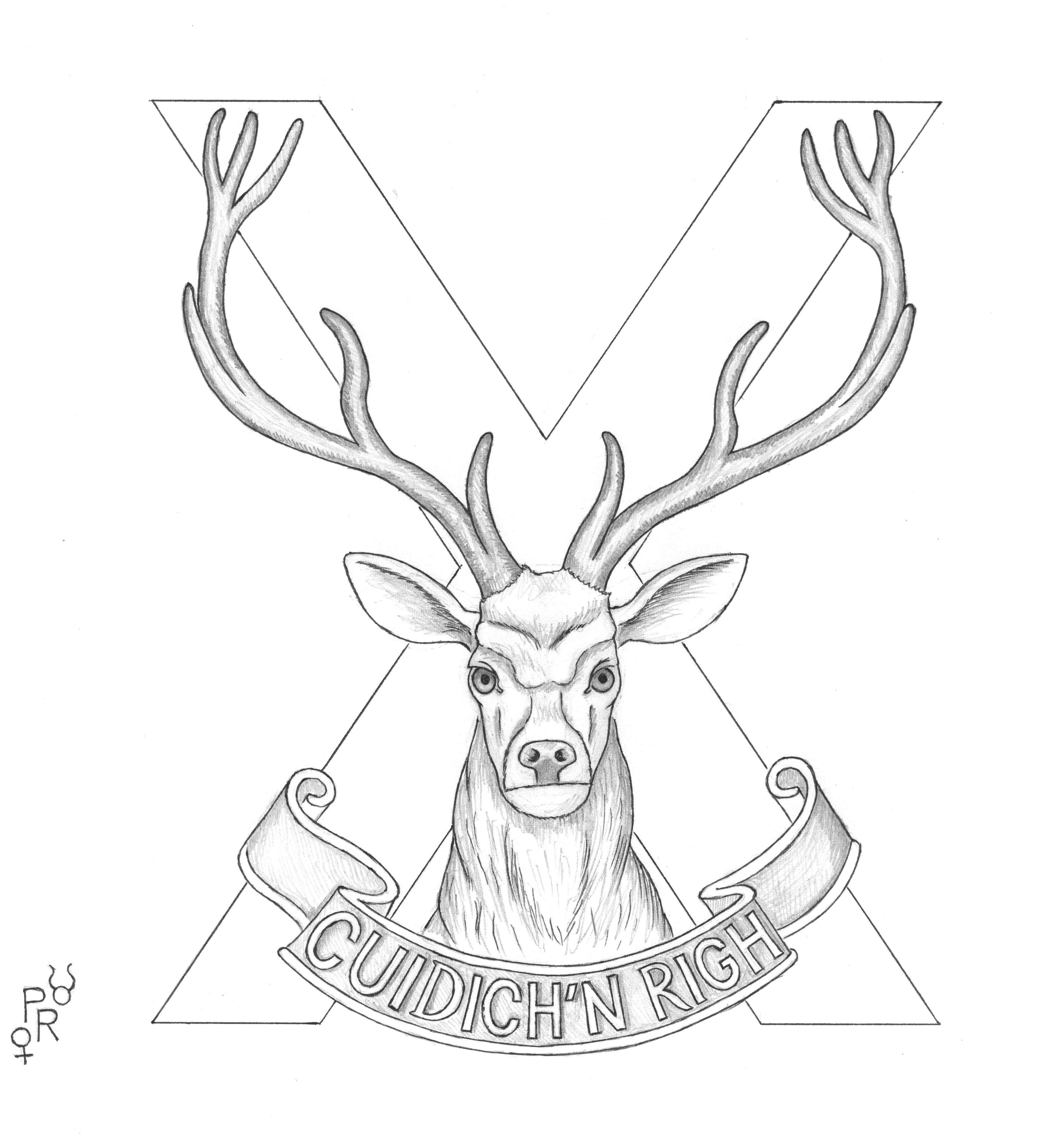
- Cap badge of the Highland Brigade, later worn by the 51st Highland Volunteers
- Active: 1946–1968
- Country: United Kingdom
- Branch: British Army
- Type: Administrative
- Garrison/HQ: Gordon Barracks, Aberdeen

Commanders
- Representative Colonel: FM Sir Archibald James Cassels (from 1963)

The Highland Brigade (known as N Group until 1948) was an administrative brigade of the British Army from 1946 to 1968, that administered the regiments with recruiting grounds in the Scottish Highlands.

== History ==
After the Second World War the British Army had fourteen infantry depots, each bearing a letter. The depots were territorially organised, and Infantry Depot N was the headquarters for the highland regiments.

In 1948, the depots adopted names and this depot became the Highland Brigade, with all regiments being reduced to a single battalion at the same time. The Highland Brigade was formally created on 14 July 1948 from the depots of six regiments:

- The Black Watch (Royal Highland Regiment)
- The Highland Light Infantry (City of Glasgow Regiment)
- The Seaforth Highlanders (Ross-shire Buffs, The Duke of Albany's)
- The Gordon Highlanders
- The Queen's Own Cameron Highlanders
- The Argyll and Sutherland Highlanders (Princess Louise's)

Under the Defence Review announced in July 1957, the infantry of the line was reorganised, and by 1961 the brigade was reduced to four battalions:

- In 1958, the Highland Light Infantry was controversially transferred to the Lowland Brigade, to become part of the amalgamated Royal Highland Fusiliers.
- On 7 February 1961, The Seaforth Highlanders and Queen's Own Cameron Highlanders were amalgamated to form the Queen's Own Highlanders (Seaforth and Camerons).

From 1958 all regiments in the brigade adopted a common cap badge consisting of the saltire of St. Andrew on which was superimposed a stag's head and a scroll inscribed Cuidigh 'n Righ. The various Territorial Battalions that were also part of the then five Highland Regiments were split off in 1967 and grouped together, eventually forming the 51st Highland Volunteers.

On 1 July 1968 the Highland Brigade was united with the Lowland Brigade, to form the Scottish Division.

== Units ==
Throughout its existence, the brigade was made up of the following units:

=== Regular battalions ===
- 1st Battalion, Black Watch (1946–1968)
- 2nd Battalion, Black Watch (1946–1948, 1952–1956)
- 1st Battalion, Highland Light Infantry (1946–1958)
- 2nd Battalion, Highland Light Infantry (1946–1948)
- 1st Battalion, Seaforth Highlanders (1946–1961)
- 2nd Battalion, Seaforth Highlanders (1946–1948)
- 1st Battalion, Gordon Highlanders (1946–1968)
- 2nd Battalion, Gordon Highlanders (1946–1948)
- 1st Battalion, Queen's Own Cameron Highlanders (1946–1961)
- 2nd Battalion, Queen's Own Cameron Highlanders (1946–1948)
- 1st Battalion, Argyll and Sutherland Highlanders (1946–1968)
- 2nd Battalion, Argyll and Sutherland Highlanders (1946–1948)
- 1st Battalion, Queen's Own Highlanders (Seaforth and Camerons) (1961–1968)

=== Territorial battalions ===
- 4th/5th (Dundee and Angus) Battalion, Black Watch (1947–1967)
- 6th/7th (Perthshire and Fife) Battalion, Black Watch (1947–1967)
- 3rd (T) Battalion, Black Watch (1967–1968)
- 5th/6th Battalion, Highland Light Infantry (1947–1967)
- 9th (Glasgow Highland) Battalion, Highland Light Infantry (1947–1949)
- 1st Battalion, Glasgow Highlanders, Highland Light Infantry (1949–1959)
- 11th Battalion, Seaforth Highlanders (1947–1967)
- 4th/7th Battalion, Gordon Highlanders (1947–1961)
- 5th/6th (Banff, Buchan and Donside) Battalion, Gordon Highlanders (1947–1961)
- London Scottish, Gordon Highlanders (1947–1967)
- 3rd Battalion, Gordon Highlanders (1961–1968)
- 4th/5th Battalion, Queen's Own Cameron Highlanders (1947–1967)
- 1st Battalion, Liverpool Scottish, Queen's Own Cameron Highlanders (1947–1967)
- 7th Battalion, Argyll and Sutherland Highlanders (1947–1967)
- 8th (The Argyllshire) Battalion, Argyll and Sutherland Highlanders (1947–1967)
- 3rd (T) Battalion, Argyll and Sutherland Highlanders (1967–1968)
- 3rd (T) Battalion, Queen's Own Highlanders (Seaforth and Camerons) (1967–1968)
