= Scots Army =

Army of the Kingdom of Scotland from 1660 to 1707

Scots Army Scots Airmy
- Royal Coat of arms of Scotland
- Active: 1660–1707
- Country: Kingdom of Scotland
- Allegiance: Scottish monarchy
- Engagements: See list: Covenanter Rebellion of 1679 Jacobite rising of 1689 Williamite War in Ireland Nine Years' War War of the Spanish Succession

Commanders
- General-in-Chief: See list: George Monck, (1660–1670) James Scott, (1674–1679) John Churchill, (1690–1691) Meinhardt Schomberg, (1691) John Churchill (1702–1707)

The Scots Army (Scots: Scots Airmy) was the army of the Kingdom of Scotland between the 1660 Stuart Restoration and Scotland's union with England to form Great Britain on 1 May 1707 following the 1706 Treaty of Union and the Acts of Union that enacted it. During the Restoration the Scots Army was raised as a small standing army which mainly engaged in suppressing Covenanter rebellions participating in counterinsurgency operations against Cameronians in Eastern Scotland. The Scottish Militia was also raised to further bolster Scotland's military capacity.

During the 1688 Glorious Revolution the Scottish army numbered over 3,500 men. Following the revolution several regiments were raised to defend the new regime of William II of Scotland, and Scottish troops served in the Nine Years' War and War of the Spanish Succession. By May 1707 the Scots Army comprised seven infantry regiments, two cavalry regiments and one troop of Horse Guards. Scottish units initially wore grey, but later adopted red uniforms similar to those worn by English Army troops from 1684 onwards. The union with England in 1707 resulted in the merger of the Scottish and English armies into the British Army, and Scottish regiments constitute an important part of the new army into the present day.

== History ==
At the Restoration in 1660 the Privy Council of Scotland established a force of several infantry regiments and a few troops of horse to act as a standing army. These included a troop of Life Guards, a second troop of which was raised in 1661, Lieutenant-General William Drummond's Regiment of Horse, five independent troops of horse, a regiment of Foot Guards, later known as the Scots Guards and Douglas' Regiment, formed and serving in France since 1633, which returned and eventually became the Royal Regiment of Foot. There were also attempts to found a national militia of 20,000 foot and 2,000 horse on the English model. The standing army was mainly employed in the suppression of Covenanter rebellions and the guerrilla war undertaken by the Cameronians in the East. In addition a "Foote Company of Highland Men" was raised and three troops of Scots Dragoons in 1678. Another three were added to make The Royal Regiment of Scots Dragoons in 1681, by which point they were already mounted on grey horses that would give them their name of the Royal Scots Greys. On the eve of the Glorious Revolution the standing army in Scotland was about 3,000 men in various regiments and another 268 veterans in the major garrison towns, at an annual cost of about £80,000.

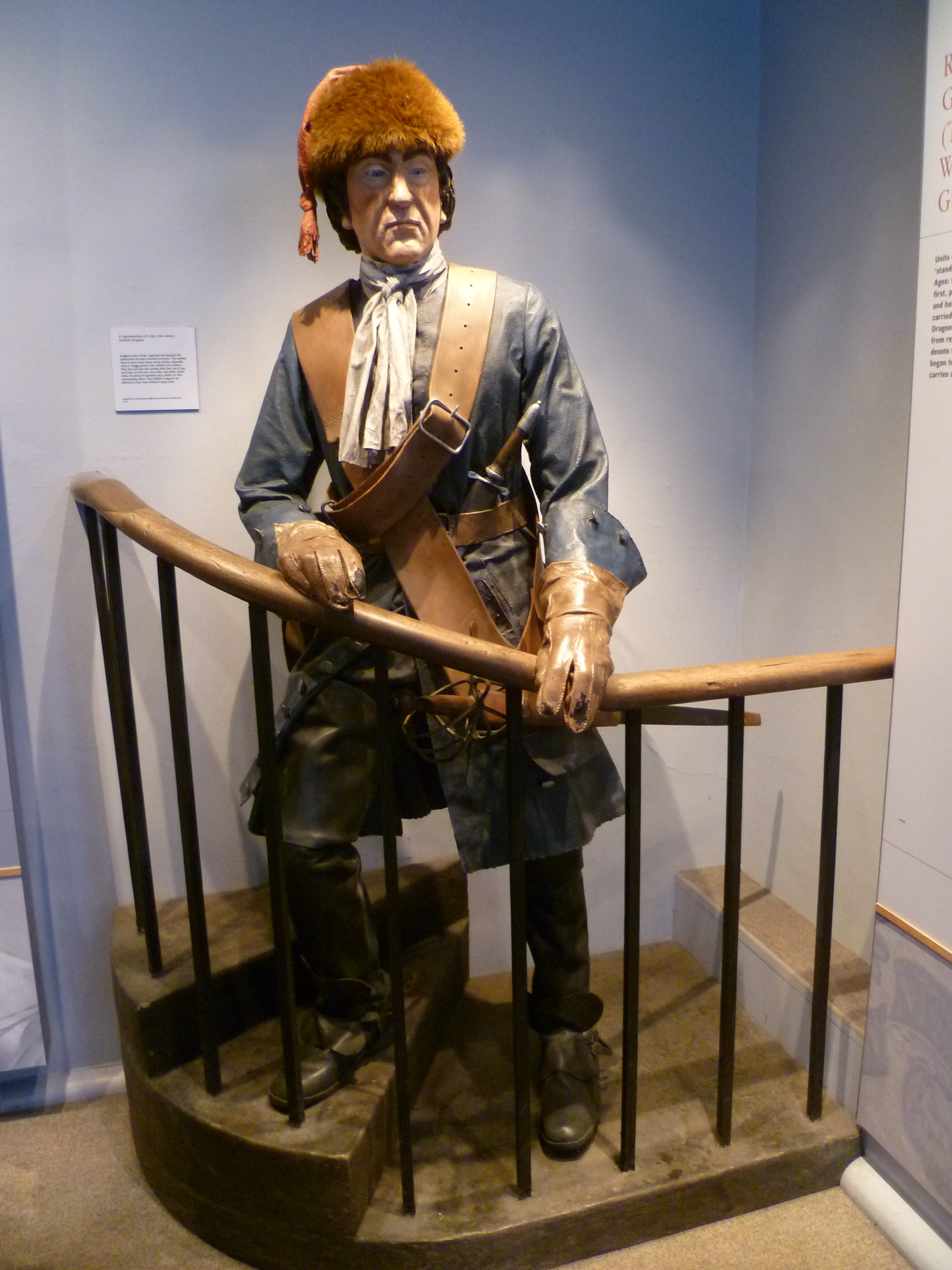
Late 17th-century dragoon of the Scots Greys.

After the Glorious Revolution of 1688–89 ten regiments were raised for the defense of the regime. Some were soon disbanded, but others served against Jacobite rebels, in Ireland and increasingly in William II's continental wars, beginning with the Nine Years' War in Flanders (1689–97). Their role was of such importance that the Scots Parliament forced Queen Anne to give royal assent to the controversial 1704 Act of Security by threatening to withdraw all Scottish forces back out of the Confederate armies. By the time of the Act of Union in 1707, the Kingdom of Scotland had a standing army of seven units of infantry, two of horse and one troop of Horse Guards, besides varying levels of fortress artillery in the garrison castles of Edinburgh, Dumbarton, and Stirling. The new British Army created by the Act of Union incorporated the existing Scottish regiments and some units would have a long regimental history, while new Scottish regiments, particularly of Highlanders, would be raised from the 1740s.

== Uniforms ==
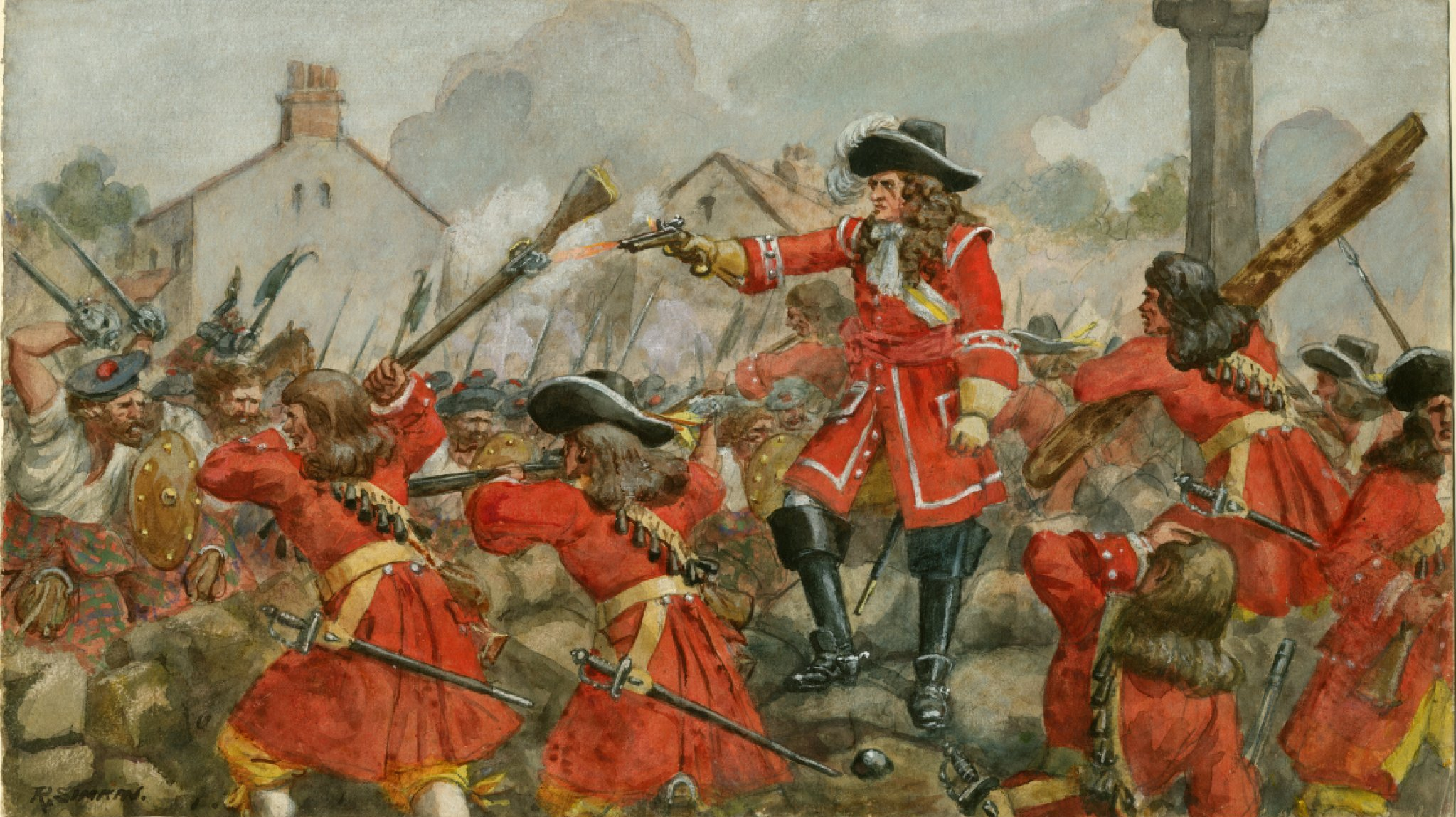
Scottish infantry engaging Jacobites at the Battle of Dunkeld, 1689.

Early units were probably dressed in homespun woollen cloth of hodden grey, which had been used during the Wars of the Three Kingdoms in the 1640s. Dragoons continued to wear grey, but from 1684 red cloth was imported from England to make uniforms that matched those of the English Army. The dragoons also eventually adopted red. Militia units may have been uniformed in blue. Units were differentiated by contrasting colours visible on the collars and cuffs on a regimental basis.

== Regimental histories ==
The following is a list of regiments commissioned between 1660 and 1707.

Name/first colonel	Date commissioned	Other colonels/names	Date disbanded
Lt-General William Drummond's Horse	1660		?
1st Troop of Life Guards	1660	4th Troop of Horse Guards 1709	1746
2nd Troop of Life Guards	1661		1663
3rd Troop of Life Guards	1663–64		1676
Royal Regiment of Scots Dragoons	1694	Royal North British Dragoons 1707, 2nd Dragoons 1717, 2nd Dragoons (Royal Scots Greys) 1877	Amalgamated 1971
Royal Regiment of Foot	1633	His Majesty's Royal Regiment of Foot 1684, 1st (Royal) Regiment of Foot 1751	
Marquis of Argyll's Royal Regiment	1642	Life Guard of Foot 1650, His Majesty's Foot Guards 1661, 3rd Regiment of Foot Guards 1714	
Lt-General Thomas Dalyell's Foot	1666		1667
Sir William Lockhart's Foot	1672		1674
Sir George Munro's Foot	1674		1676
Earl of Mar's Foot	1677	Royal Scots Fusiliers 1695	Amalgamated 1959
Lord Douglas's Foot	1678		1679
John Wauchope's Foot	1688		1717
Lord Bargany's Foot	1689		1689
Lord Blantyre's Foot	1689		1689
Earl of Glencairn's Foot	1689		1689
Earl of Mar's Foot	1689		1689
Lord Strathnaver's 1st Foot	1689		1690
Grant's Foot	1689		1690
Laird of Grant's Foot	1689		1691
Viscount Kenmure's Foot	1689		1691
Earl of Argyll's Foot	1689	John Lord Lorne 1694	1698
John Hill's Foot	1689		1698
Richard Cunningham's Foot	1689		1698
Sir James Moncrief's Foot	1689	George Hamilton 1694	1714
Earl of Angus's Foot	1689	Cameronians, 26th Foot 1751	Amalgamated 1881
Lord Leven's Foot	1689	Semphill's Foot c. 1745, 25th Foot 1751, King's Own Borderers 1805	Amalgamated 2006
John Hill's Foot	1690		1698
William Douglas's 1st Foot	1694		?
William Douglas's 2nd Foot	1694		1697
Lord John Murray's Foot	1694	Earl of Tullibardine	1697
Lord Lindsay (later Lord Crawford)'s Foot	1694		1697
Robert Mackay's 1st Foot	?		?
Robert Mackay's 2nd Foot	?		1697
Lord Strathnaver's 2nd Foot	1698	John Lord Lorne 1702, John Marquis of Tullibardine	1717
Lord Strathnaver's 3rd Foot	1702		1713
Earl of Mar's Foot	1702	Alexander Grant 1706	1713
Lt-Col George MacCartney's Foot	1704		1713

== See also ==
- Military history of Scotland
- Warfare in early modern Scotland
