= Lowland Brigade (United Kingdom) =

Military unit in the British Army

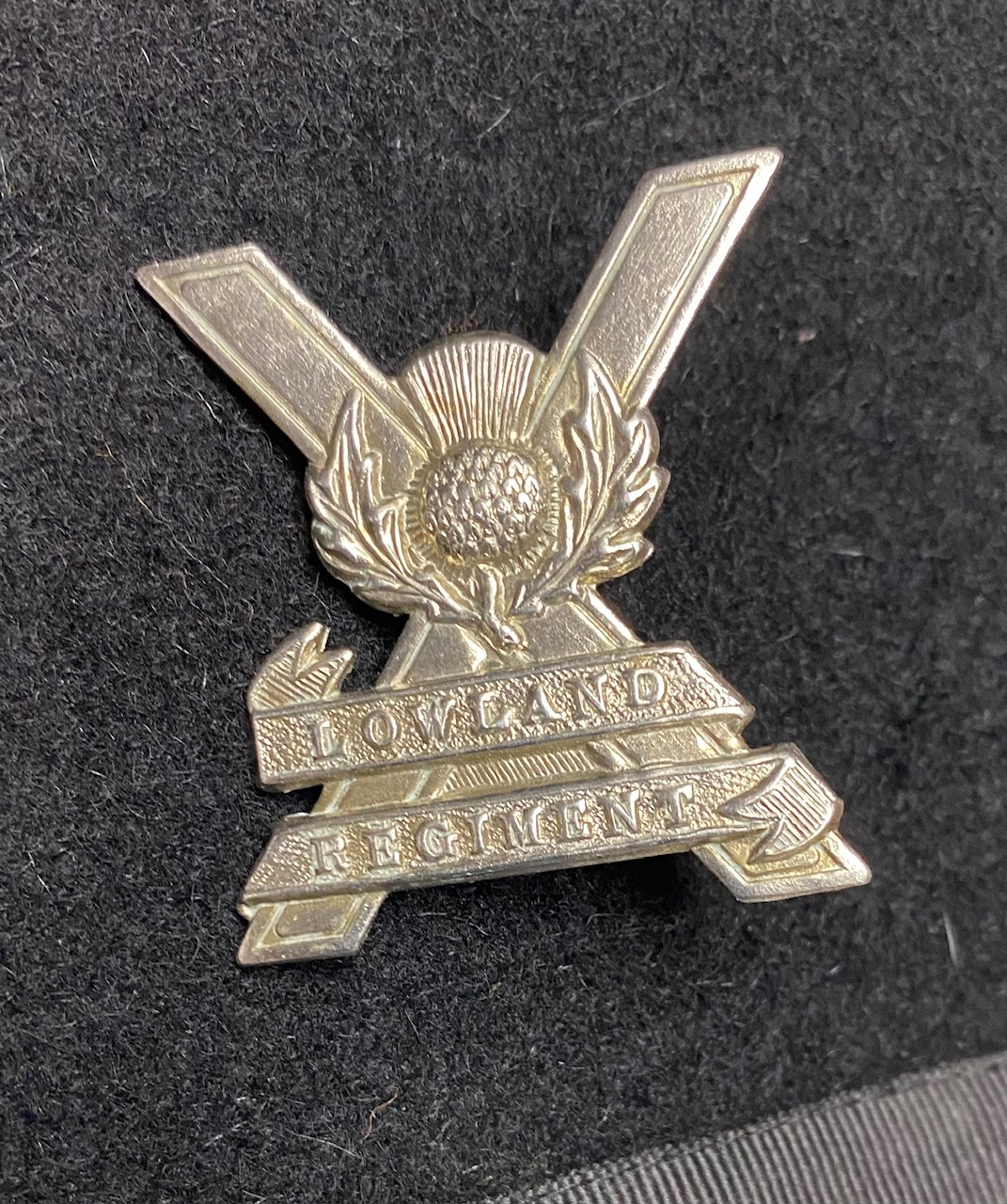
Cap badge

The Lowland Brigade is a historical unit of the British Army which has been formed a number of times. It is traditionally Scottish as the name derives from the Scottish Lowlands.

== World War II ==
There was a Lowland Brigade (the 44th, part of the 15th Scottish Division) in World War II; it fought in the Normandy invasion, and in North-West Europe.

== Administrative brigade 1948–1968 ==
After the Second World War the British Army had fourteen infantry depots, each bearing a letter. The depots were territorially organised, and Infantry Depot B was the headquarters for the Scottish lowland regiments.

In 1948, the depots adopted names and this depot became the Lowland Brigade, with all regiments being reduced to a single regular battalion at the same time. The Lowland Brigade was reformed on 14 July 1948, merging the depots of the following regiments:

- The Royal Scots (The Royal Regiment)
- The Royal Scots Fusiliers
- The King's Own Scottish Borderers
- The Cameronians (Scottish Rifles)

Under the Defence Review announced in July 1957, the infantry of the line was reorganised, leading to the transfer of the Highland Light Infantry from the Highland Brigade in 1958, and its amalgamation with the Royal Scots Fusiliers to form the Royal Highland Fusiliers on 20 January 1959.

In 1958 the regiments adopted a common cap badge. This depicted the saltire of St. Andrew, on which was superimposed a thistle within a circlet inscribed with motto of the Order of the Thistle, nemo me impune lacessit. From 1960 the Lowland Brigade was based at Glencorse Barracks.

The various Territorial Battalions that were also part of the four Lowland Regiments were split off in 1967 and grouped together, eventually forming the 52nd Lowland Volunteers.

The Brigade continued to administer the four regiments until 1968. On 14 May that year The Cameronians were disbanded, having chosen this option rather than amalgamation. On 1 July the Lowland Brigade was amalgamated with the Highland Brigade to form the Scottish Division.
