= Highland Brigade (United Kingdom) =

Historical unit of the British Army

The Highland Brigade is a historical unit of the British Army, which has been formed and reformed a number of times. It recruited men from the Highlands of Scotland.

== Crimean War ==
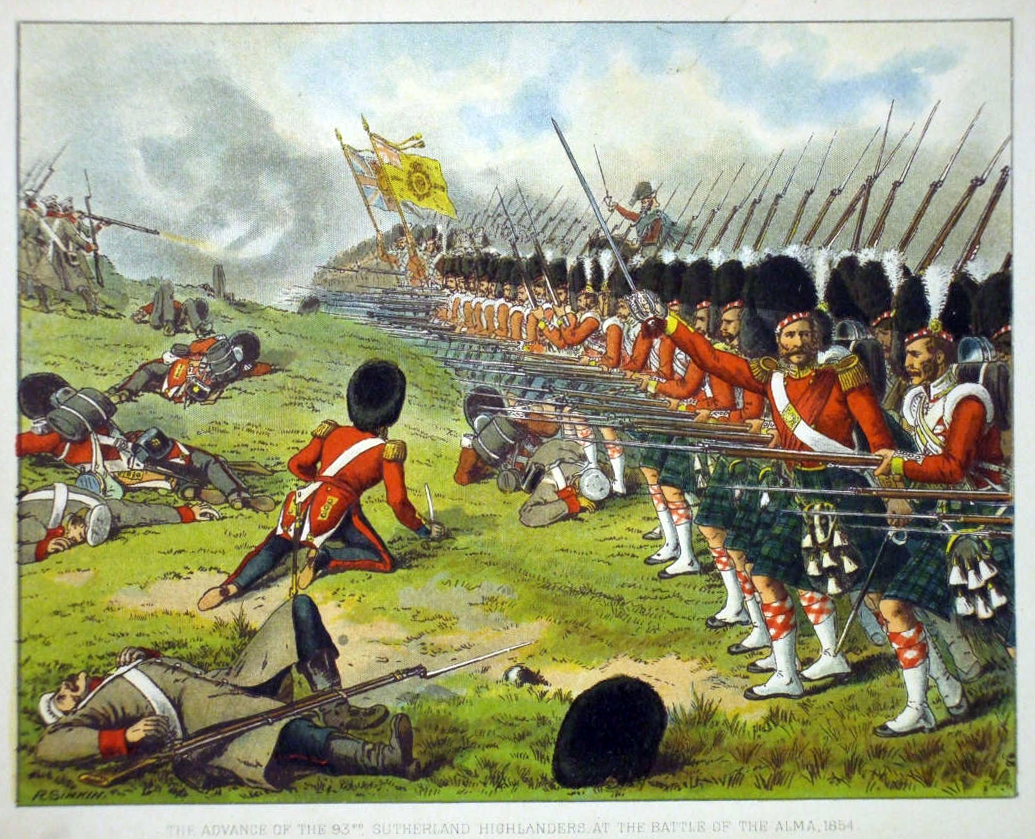
93rd Sutherland Highlanders at the Battle of Alma

A Highland Brigade was present at the Crimean War (1854–1856), as part of the 1st Division; it was initially under the command of Major-General Sir Colin Campbell (Lord Clyde). It played a significant role in the Battle of Alma.

This Highland Brigade consisted of the:

- 42nd (Royal Highland) Regiment of Foot
- 79th (The Queen's Own Cameron Highlanders) Regiment of Foot
- 93rd (Sutherland Highlanders) Regiment of Foot.

== Egyptian Rebellion ==
There was a Highland Brigade operating in Egypt from 1882, during the Egyptian Rebellion (1882–1885), under the command of Major General Archibald Alison. Major General Alison's Brigade formed the left wing of General Sir Garnet Wolseley's army at the Battle of Tel-El-Kebir where they suffered 243 casualties (from the total casualties for Wolsey's force of 339).

This Highland brigade consisted of the:

- 2nd Battalion, Highland Light Infantry
- 1st Battalion, Black Watch (Royal Highlanders)
- 1st Battalion, Cameron Highlanders
- 1st Battalion, Gordon Highlanders

== Second Boer War ==
A Highland Brigade participated in the Second Boer War (1899–1902) in South Africa, under the command of Major General Andrew Gilbert Wauchope. It suffered severe losses at the battle Magersfontein (including General Wauchope). Command of the Brigade was then given to Major General Hector MacDonald who led the brigade throughout the remainder of the war. The Brigade fought at the Battle of Paardeberg where on 18 February 1900 (known as Bloody Sunday) it again suffered heavy casualties.

On its formation in 1899, the Highland Brigade consisted of the:

- 2nd Battalion, Black Watch
- 2nd Battalion, Seaforth Highlanders
- 1st Battalion, Argyll and Sutherland Highlanders
- 1st Battalion, Highland Light Infantry

In February 1900 the Highland Light Infantry transferred to the 19th Brigade under Major-General Horace Smith-Dorrien, and the Gordon Highlanders joined the Highland Brigade.
